= Parliamentary constituencies in the West Midlands (region) =

The region (Note: See NUTS 1 statistical regions of England.) of the West Midlands is divided into 57 parliamentary constituencies which is made up of 28 borough constituencies and 29 county constituencies. Since the general election of July 2024, 37 are represented by Labour MPs, 15 by Conservative MPs, 2 by Liberal Democrat MPs, 1 by a Green MP, 1 by an independent MP, and 1 by a Your Party MP.

== Constituencies ==
† Conservative ‡ Labour ¤ Liberal Democrat ♣ Green Party ♠ Independent # Reform UK ∞ Workers § Your

Constituency (Note: BC denotes borough constituency, CC denotes county constituency.)	Electorate	Majority (Note: The majority is the number of votes the winning candidate receives more than their nearest rival.)	Member of Parliament	Nearest opposition	County	Constituency map
Aldridge-Brownhills BC	70,867	4,231	Wendy Morton†	Luke Davies‡	West Midlands	
Birmingham Edgbaston BC	71,787	8,368	Preet Gill‡	Ashvir Sangha†	West Midlands	
Birmingham Erdington BC	77,463	7,019	Paulette Hamilton‡	Jack Brookes#	West Midlands	
Birmingham Hall Green and Moseley BC	75,781	5,656	Tahir Ali‡	Shakeel Afsar♠	West Midlands	
Birmingham Hodge Hill and Solihull North BC	77,737	1,566	Liam Byrne‡	James Giles∞	West Midlands	
Birmingham Ladywood BC	76,585	3,421	Shabana Mahmood‡	Akhmed Yakoob♠	West Midlands	
Birmingham Northfield BC	74,048	5,389	Laurence Turner‡	Gary Sambrook†	West Midlands	
Birmingham Perry Barr BC	76,350	507	Ayoub Khan♠	Khalid Mahmood‡	West Midlands	
Birmingham Selly Oak BC	75,678	11,537	Alistair Carns‡	Simon Phipps†	West Midlands	
Birmingham Yardley BC	73,203	693	Jess Phillips‡	Jody McIntyre∞	West Midlands	
Bromsgrove CC	76,468	3,016	Bradley Thomas†	Neena Gill‡	Worcestershire	
Burton and Uttoxeter CC	77,992	2,266	Jacob Collier‡	Kate Kniveton†	Staffordshire	
Cannock Chase CC	76,974	3,125	Josh Newbury‡	Amanda Milling†	Staffordshire	
Coventry East BC	75,801	11,623	Mary Creagh‡	Iddrisu Sufyan#	West Midlands	
Coventry North West BC	75,057	11,174	Taiwo Owatemi‡	Tom Mercer†	West Midlands	
Coventry South BC	76,262	10,201	Zarah Sultana§ (Note: Sultana resigned from the Labour Party in July 2025. She was named Your Party's first MP in November.)	Mattie Heaven†	West Midlands	
Droitwich and Evesham CC	76,624	8,995	Nigel Huddleston†	Chipiliro Kalebe-Nyamongo‡	Worcestershire	
Dudley BC	70,151	1,900	Sonia Kumar‡	Marco Longhi†	West Midlands	
Halesowen BC	68,549	4,364	Alex Ballinger‡	James Morris†	West Midlands	
Hereford and South Herefordshire CC	72,203	1,279	Jesse Norman†	Joseph Emmet ‡	Herefordshire	
Kenilworth and Southam CC	74,923	6,574	Jeremy Wright†	Cat Price‡	Warwickshire	
Kingswinford and South Staffordshire CC	71,662	6,303	Mike Wood†	Sally Benton‡	Staffordshire / West Midlands	
Lichfield CC	76,118	810	Dave Robertson‡	Michael Fabricant†	Staffordshire	
Meriden and Solihull East CC	73,659	4,584	Saqib Bhatti†	Sarah Alan‡	West Midlands	
Newcastle-under-Lyme CC	67,839	5,069	Adam Jogee‡	Simon Tagg†	Staffordshire	
North Herefordshire CC	72,797	5,894	Ellie Chowns♣	Bill Wiggin†	Herefordshire	
North Shropshire CC	77,573	15,311	Helen Morgan¤	Simon Baynes†	Shropshire	
North Warwickshire and Bedworth CC	69,752	2,198	Rachel Taylor‡	Craig Tracey†	Warwickshire	
Nuneaton CC	71,843	3,479	Jodie Gosling‡	Marcus Jones†	Warwickshire	
Redditch CC	71,038	789	Chris Bloor‡	Rachel Maclean†	Worcestershire	
Rugby CC	74,901	4,428	John Slinger‡	Yousef Dahmash†	Warwickshire	
Shrewsbury CC	77,573	11,355	Julia Buckley‡	Daniel Kawczynski†	Shropshire	
Smethwick BC	72,863	11,188	Gurinder Josan‡	Pete Durnell#	West Midlands	
Solihull West and Shirley BC	71,813	4,620	Neil Shastri-Hurst†	Deirdre Fox‡	West Midlands	
South Shropshire CC	76,723	1,624	Stuart Anderson†	Matthew Green¤	Shropshire	
Stafford CC	70,608	4,595	Leigh Ingham‡	Theo Clarke†	Staffordshire	
Staffordshire Moorlands CC	69,892	1,175	Karen Bradley†	Alistair Watson‡	Staffordshire	
Stoke-on-Trent Central BC	73,693	6,409	Gareth Snell‡	Luke Shenton#	Staffordshire	
Stoke-on-Trent North BC	69,790	5,082	David Williams‡	Jonathan Gullis†	Staffordshire	
Stoke-on-Trent South CC	70,002	627	Allison Gardner ‡	Jack Brereton†	Staffordshire	
Stone, Great Wyrley and Penkridge CC	71,570	5,466	Gavin Williamson†	Jaqueline Brown‡	Staffordshire	
Stourbridge BC	68,310	3,073	Cat Eccles‡	Suzanne Webb†	West Midlands	
Stratford-on-Avon CC	75,725	7,122	Manuela Perteghella¤	Chris Clarkson†	Warwickshire	
Sutton Coldfield BC	74,080	2,543	Andrew Mitchell†	Rob Pocock‡	West Midlands	
Tamworth CC	75,059	1,382	Sarah Edwards‡	Eddie Hughes†	Staffordshire	
Telford BC	73,808	8,120	Shaun Davies ‡	Alan Adams#	Shropshire	
The Wrekin CC	78,942	883	Mark Pritchard†	Roh Yakobi‡	Shropshire	
Tipton and Wednesbury BC	74,100	3,385	Antonia Bance‡	Shaun Bailey†	West Midlands	
Walsall and Bloxwich BC	74,951	4,914	Valerie Vaz‡	Aftab Nawaz♠	West Midlands	
Warwick and Leamington CC	76,294	12,412	Matt Western‡	James Uffindell†	Warwickshire	
West Bromwich BC	74,026	9,554	Sarah Coombes‡	Will Goodhand†	West Midlands	
West Worcestershire CC	79,242	6,547	Harriett Baldwin †	Dan Boatright ¤	Worcestershire	
Wolverhampton North East BC	70,715	5,422	Sureena Brackenridge‡	Jane Stevenson†	West Midlands	
Wolverhampton South East BC	77,473	9,188	Pat McFadden ‡	Carl Hardwick#	West Midlands	
Wolverhampton West BC	77,851	7,868	Warinder Juss‡	Mike Newton†	West Midlands	
Worcester BC	74,931	7,116	Tom Collins‡	Mark Bayliss†	Worcestershire	
Wyre Forest CC	77,394	812	Mark Garnier†	Vicki Smith‡	Worcestershire	

== Proposed boundary changes ==
See 2023 review of Westminster constituencies for further details.

Following the abandonment of the Sixth Periodic Review (the 2018 review), the Boundary Commission for England formally launched the 2023 Review on 5 January 2021. The Commission calculated that the number of seats to be allocated to the West Midlands region would be reduced by 2, from 59 to 57. Initial proposals were published on 8 June 2021 and, following two periods of public consultation, revised proposals were published on 8 November 2022. The final proposals were published on 28 June 2023.

Under the proposals, the following constituencies for the region came into effect at the 2024 general election:

Constituency	Electorate	Ceremonial county	Local authority
Aldridge-Brownhills	73,122	West Midlands	Walsall
Birmingham Edgbaston	71,354	West Midlands	Birmingham
Birmingham Erdington	76,856	West Midlands	Birmingham
Birmingham Hall Green and Moseley	75,781	West Midlands	Birmingham
Birmingham Hodge Hill and Solihull North	76,922	West Midlands	Birmingham / Solihull
Birmingham Ladywood	76,585	West Midlands	Birmingham
Birmingham Northfield	73,483	West Midlands	Birmingham
Birmingham Perry Barr	74,048	West Midlands	Birmingham
Birmingham Selly Oak	76,285	West Midlands	Birmingham
Birmingham Yardley	71,912	West Midlands	Birmingham
Bromsgrove	75,305	Worcestershire	Bromsgrove
Burton and Uttoxeter	75,460	Staffordshire	East Staffordshire
Cannock Chase	75,582	Staffordshire	Cannock Chase
Coventry East	73,389	West Midlands	Coventry
Coventry North West	73,431	West Midlands	Coventry
Coventry South	70,998	West Midlands	Coventry
Droitwich and Evesham	74,345	Worcestershire	Wychavon
Dudley	71,083	West Midlands	Dudley
Halesowen	69,907	West Midlands	Dudley / Sandwell
Hereford and South Herefordshire	71,125	Herefordshire	Herefordshire
Kenilworth and Southam	71,541	Warwickshire	Rugby / Stratford-on-Avon / Warwick
Kingswinford and South Staffordshire	71,896	Staffordshire / West Midlands	Dudley / South Staffordshire
Lichfield	74,942	Staffordshire	East Staffordshire / Lichfield
Meriden and Solihull East	74,211	West Midlands	Solihull
Newcastle-under-Lyme	70,025	Staffordshire	Newcastle-under-Lyme
North Herefordshire	70,894	Herefordshire	Herefordshire
North Shropshire	77,052	Shropshire	Shropshire
North Warwickshire and Bedworth	70,245	Warwickshire	North Warwickshire / Nuneaton and Bedworth
Nuneaton	70,335	Warwickshire	North Warwickshire / Nuneaton and Bedworth
Redditch	69,921	Worcestershire	Redditch / Wychavon
Rugby	72,603	Warwickshire	Nuneaton and Bedworth / Rugby
Shrewsbury	75,139	Shropshire	Shropshire
Smethwick	71,195	West Midlands	Sandwell
Solihull West and Shirley	70,537	West Midlands	Solihull
South Shropshire	77,034	Shropshire	Shropshire
Stafford	70,537	Staffordshire	Newcastle-under-Lyme / Stafford
Staffordshire Moorlands	70,113	Staffordshire	Staffordshire Moorlands
Stoke-on-Trent Central	70,550	Staffordshire	Stoke-on-Trent
Stoke-on-Trent North	69,821	Staffordshire	Newcastle-under-Lyme / Stoke-on-Trent
Stoke-on-Trent South	69,831	Staffordshire	Stafford / Staffordshire Moorlands / Stoke-on-Trent
Stone, Great Wyrley and Penkridge	70,701	Staffordshire	South Staffordshire / Stafford
Stourbridge	69,840	West Midlands	Dudley
Stratford-on-Avon	72,388	Warwickshire	Stratford-on-Avon
Sutton Coldfield	74,584	West Midlands	Birmingham
Tamworth	73,644	Staffordshire	Lichfield / Tamworth
Telford	70,768	Shropshire	Telford and Wrekin
The Wrekin	76,143	Shropshire	Shropshire / Telford and Wrekin
Tipton and Wednesbury	73,820	West Midlands	Dudley / Sandwell
Walsall and Bloxwich	74,886	West Midlands	Walsall
Warwick and Leamington	75,440	Warwickshire	Warwick
West Bromwich	72,208	West Midlands	Sandwell
West Worcestershire	76,638	Worcestershire	Malvern Hills / Wychavon
Wolverhampton North East	70,449	West Midlands	Walsall / Wolverhampton
Wolverhampton South East	75,685	West Midlands	Walsall / Wolverhampton
Wolverhampton West	75,592	West Midlands	Wolverhampton
Worcester	73,928	Worcestershire	Worcester
Wyre Forest	77,015	Worcestershire	Wyre Forest

== Historical Representation by Party ==
A cell marked → (with a different colour background to the preceding cell) indicates that the previous MP continued to sit under a new party name.

=== 1885 to 1918 ===
==== Warwickshire ====
Conservative

  Liberal
  Speaker
  Labour
  Liberal Unionist

Constituency	1885	1886	87	88	89	90	91	1892	93	94	1895	96	97	98	99	1900	01	02	03	04	05	1906	07	08	09	1910 (jan)	1910 (dec)	11	12	13	14	15	16	17
Nuneaton	Jasper Johns	John Dugdale						Francis Newdegate														William Johnson			→						→			
Rugby	Henry Peyton Cobb										Richard Verney					Corrie Grant										John Baird								
Stratford-upon-Avon	William Compton	Frederick Townsend						Algernon Freeman-Mitford			Victor Milward						Philip Foster					Thomas Kincaid-Smith			Philip Foster									
Warwick and Leamington	Arthur Peel										Alfred Lyttelton											Thomas Berridge				Ernest Pollock								

==== Herefordshire and Worcestershire ====
Conservative Liberal Liberal Unionist

Constituency	1885	1886	87	88	89	90	91	1892	93	94	1895	96	97	98	99	1900	01	02	03	04	05	1906	07	08	09	1910 (jan)	1910 (dec)	11	12	13	14	15	16	17
Bewdley	Edmund Lechmere							Alfred Baldwin																Stanley Baldwin										
Droitwich	John Corbett	→						Richard Martin														Cecil Harmsworth				John Lyttelton			→					
East Worcestershire	George Hastings	→						Austen Chamberlain																					→					
Evesham	Richard Temple							Edmund Lechmere			Charles Long															Bolton Eyres-Monsell								
Hereford	Joseph Pulley	Joseph Bailey						William Grenfell	Charles Cooke							John Arkwright																		
Kidderminster	John Brinton	Augustus Godson																				Edmund Barnard				Eric Knight								
Leominster	Thomas Duckham	James Rankin																				Edmund Lamb				James Rankin								
Ross	Michael Biddulph	→														Percy Clive						Alan Coulston Gardner		Percy Clive					→					
Worcester	George Allsopp																					George Henry Williamson		Edward Goulding										

==== Staffordshire ====
Conservative Liberal Liberal-Labour Labour Liberal Unionist

Constituency	1885	1886	87	88	89	90	91	1892	93	94	1895	96	97	98	99	1900	01	02	03	04	05	1906	07	08	09	1910 (jan)	1910 (dec)	11	12	13	14	15	16	17
Burton	Michael Bass	Sydney Evershed														Robert Ratcliff													→					
Hanley	William Woodall															Arthur Heath						Enoch Edwards				→								
Leek	Charles Crompton	Harry Davenport						Henry Fulford														Robert Pearce				Arthur Heath	Robert Pearce							
Lichfield	John Swinburne							Leonard Darwin			Henry Fulford	Courtenay Warner																						
Newcastle-under-Lyme	William Shepherd Allen	Douglas Coghill						William Allen								Alfred Seale Haslam						Josiah Wedgwood												
Stafford	Charles McLaren	Thomas Salt						Charles Shaw																			Walter Essex							
Staffordshire North West	George Leveson-Gower	Justinian Edwards-Heathcote						James Heath														Alfred Billson			Albert Stanley	→								
Staffordshire West	Hamar Bass	→												Alexander Henderson								Henry McLaren				George Lloyd			→					
Stoke on Trent	William Leatham Bright					George Leveson-Gower					Douglas Coghill					→						John Ward												

==== Shropshire ====
Conservative Liberal Liberal Unionist

Constituency	1885	1886	87	88	89	90	91	1892	93	94	1895	96	97	98	99	1900	01	02	03	04	05	1906	07	08	09	1910 (jan)	1910 (dec)	11	12	13	14	15	16	17
Ludlow	Jasper More	→																	Rowland Hunt															
Newport	Robert Bickersteth	William Kenyon-Slaney																						Beville Stanier										
Oswestry	Stanley Leighton																George Ormsby-Gore			Allan Heywood Bright		William Bridgeman												
Shrewsbury	Arthur Peel							Henry David Greene														Clement Lloyd Hill												
Wellington	Alexander Brown	→																				Charles Henry												

==== Birmingham ====
Conservative Liberal Liberal-Labour Liberal Unionist

Constituency	1885	1886	87	88	89	90	91	1892	93	94	1895	96	97	98	99	1900	01	02	03	04	05	1906	07	08	09	1910 (jan)	1910 (dec)	11	12	13	14	15	16	17
Aston Manor	Hugh Reid	George Kynoch					Robert Ratcliff									Evelyn Cecil																		
Birmingham Bordesley	Henry Broadhurst	Jesse Collings																											→					
Birmingham Central	John Bright	→			John Albert Bright						Ebenezer Parkes																		→					
Birmingham East	William Cook	Henry Matthews									John Benjamin Stone															Arthur Steel-Maitland								
Birmingham Edgbaston	George Dixon	→												Francis Lowe																				
Birmingham North	William Kenrick	→													John Middlemore														→					
Birmingham South	Joseph Powell Williams	→																		Viscount Morpeth								Leo Amery	→					
Birmingham West	Joseph Chamberlain	→																											→		Austen Chamberlain			
Handsworth	Henry Wiggin	→						Henry Meysey-Thompson														Ernest Meysey-Thompson							→					

==== Dudley ====
Conservative Liberal

Constituency	1885	1886	87	88	89	90	91	1892	93	94	1895	96	97	98	99	1900	01	02	03	04	05	1906	07	08	09	1910 (jan)	1910 (dec)	11	12	13	14	15	16	17
Dudley	Henry Brinsley Sheridan	Brooke Robinson																				Arthur George Hooper					Arthur Griffith-Boscawen							
Kingswinford	Alexander Staveley Hill															William George Webb						Henry Staveley-Hill												
Worcestershire North	Benjamin Hingley	→						→			John William Wilson								→															

==== Sutton Coldfield, Solihull, and Coventry ====
Conservative Liberal

Constituency	1885	1886	87	88	89	90	91	1892	93	94	1895	96	97	98	99	1900	01	02	03	04	05	1906	07	08	09	1910 (jan)	1910 (dec)	11	12	13	14	15	16	17
Coventry	Henry Eaton		William Ballantine								Charles James Murray											A. E. W. Mason				Kenneth Foster (politician)	David Marshall Mason							
Tamworth	Henry Brinsley Sheridan	Brooke Robinson																				Arthur George Hooper					Arthur Griffith-Boscawen							

=== 1918 to 1950 ===
==== Warwickshire ====
Conservative Liberal Labour Independent

Constituency	1918	19	20	21	1922	1923	1924	25	26	27	28	1929	30	1931	32	33	34	1935	36	37	38	39	40	41	42	43	44	45	46	47	48	49
Nuneaton	Henry Maddocks					Herbert Willison	Arthur Hope					Frank Smith		Edward North				Reginald Fletcher							Frank Bowles							
Rugby	John Baird				Euan Wallace	Ernest Brown	David Margesson																		William Brown							
Warwick and Leamington	Ernest Pollock					Sir Anthony Eden																										

==== Herefordshire and Worcestershire ====
Conservative Liberal Labour

Constituency	1918	19	20	21	1922	1923	1924	25	26	27	28	1929	30	1931	32	33	34	1935	36	37	38	39	40	41	42	43	44	45	46	47	48	49
Bewdley	Stanley Baldwin																			Roger Conant												
Evesham	Bolton Eyres-Monsell																	Rupert De la Bère														
Hereford	Charles Pulley			Samuel Roberts								Frank Owen		James Thomas																		
Kidderminster	Eric Knight				John Wardlaw-Milne																							Louis Tolley				
Leominster	Charles Ward-Jackson				Ernest Shepperson																							Archer Baldwin				
Worcester	Edward Goulding				Richard Robert Fairbairn	Crawford Greene																						George Ward				

==== Staffordshire ====
Coalition Liberal (1918–22) / National Liberal (1922–23) Conservative Liberal Labour Coalition Labour National Labour New Party National Liberal National Democratic and Labour Party Constitutionalist

Constituency	1918	19	20	21	1922	1923	1924	25	26	27	28	1929	30	1931	32	33	34	1935	36	37	38	39	40	41	42	43	44	45	46	47	48	49
Burton	John Gretton, 1st Baron Gretton																									John Gretton, 2st Baron Gretton		Arthur W. Lyne				
Cannock	James Parker				William Adamson									Sarah Ward				William Adamson										Jennie Lee				
Leek	William Bromfield													Arthur Ratcliffe				William Bromfield										Harold Davies				
Lichfield	Courtenay Warner	→			→	Frank Hodges	Roy Wilson					James Lovat-Fraser		→							Cecil Poole											
Newcastle-under-Lyme	Josiah Wedgwood	→												→				→							John Mack							
Stafford	William Ormsby-Gore																				Peter Thorneycroft							Stephen Swingler				
Stone	Sir Smith Child				Joseph Lamb																							Hugh Fraser				
Stoke on Trent Burslem	Samuel Finney				Andrew MacLaren	William Edward Robinson	Andrew MacLaren							William Allen				Andrew MacLaren										Albert Davies				
Stoke on Trent Hanley	James Seddon				Myles Harper Parker		Samuel Clowes				Arthur Hollins			Harold Hales				Arthur Hollins										Barnett Stross				
Stoke on Trent Stoke	John Ward				→	→	→	→				Lady Mosley	→	Ida Copeland				Ellis Smith														

==== Shropshire ====
Coalition Liberal Conservative Liberal Labour Independent Unionist/Independent Parliamentary Group

Constituency	1918	19	20	21	1922	1923	1924	25	26	27	28	1929	30	1931	32	33	34	1935	36	37	38	39	40	41	42	43	44	45	46	47	48	49
Ludlow	Beville Stanier				Ivor Windsor-Clive	George Windsor-Clive																						Uvedale Corbett				
Oswestry	William Clive Bridgeman											Bertie Leighton																Oliver Poole				
Shrewsbury	George Butler Lloyd				Dudley Ryder	Joseph Sunlight	Dudley Ryder					Arthur Duckworth																John Langford-Holt				
The Wrekin	Charles Solomon Henry	Charles Palmer	C. V. F. Townshend		Howard Button	Henry Nixon	Thomas Oakley					Edith Picton-Turbervill		James Baldwin-Webb										Arthur Colegate				Ivor Owen Thomas				

==== Birmingham ====
Conservative/Coalition Conservative Labour/Labour and Co-operative Party National Democratic and Labour Party

Constituency	1918	19	20	21	1922	1923	1924	25	26	27	28	1929	30	1931	32	33	34	1935	36	37	38	39	40	41	42	43	44	1945	46	47	48	49
Birmingham Aston	Evelyn Cecil				→							John Strachey		Sir Arthur Hope								Edward Orlando Kellett				Redvers Prior		Woodrow Wyatt				
Birmingham Deritend	John William Dennis				Smedley Crooke							Fred Longden		Smedley Crooke														Fred Longden				
Birmingham Duddeston	Eldred Hallas	→			Ernest Hiley	John Burman						George Francis Sawyer		Oliver Simmonds														Edith Wills				
Birmingham Edgbaston	Francis Lowe											Neville Chamberlain											Peter Bennett									
Birmingham Erdington	Arthur Steel-Maitland											Charles Simmons		John Eales					John Cecil-Wright									Julius Silverman				
Birmingham Handsworth	Ernest Meysey-Thompson				Oliver Locker-Lampson																							Harold Roberts				
Birmingham King's Norton	Herbert Austin				→		Robert Dennison					Lionel Beaumont-Thomas						Ronald Cartland						John Peto				Raymond Blackburn				
Birmingham Ladywood	Neville Chamberlain											Wilfrid Whiteley		Geoffrey William Lloyd														Victor Yates				
Birmingham Moseley	Hallewell Rogers			Patrick Hannon	→																											
Birmingham Sparkbrook	Leo Amery				→																							Percy Shurmer				
Birmingham West	Austen Chamberlain				→															Walter Higgs								Charles Simmons				
Birmingham Yardley	Alfred Jephcott											Archibald Gossling		Edward Salt														Wesley Perrins				

==== Dudley ====
Conservative Liberal Labour

Constituency	1918	19	20	21	1922	1923	1924	25	26	27	28	1929	30	1931	32	33	34	1935	36	37	38	39	40	41	42	43	44	45	46	47	48	49
Dudley	Arthur Griffith-Boscawen			James Wilson	Cyril Lloyd							Oliver Baldwin		Dudley Joel										Cyril Lloyd				George Wigg				
Kingswinford	Charles Sitch													Alan Todd				Arthur Henderson														
Stourbridge	John William Wilson				Douglas Pielou					Wilfred Wellock				Robert Morgan														Arthur Moyle				

==== Sutton Coldfield, Solihull, and Coventry ====
Conservative Labour

Constituency	1918	19	20	21	1922	1923	1924	25	26	27	28	1929	30	1931	32	33	34	1935	36	37	38	39	40	41	42	43	44	45	46	47	48	49
Coventry	Edward Manville					A. A. Purcell	Archibald Boyd-Carpenter					Philip Noel-Baker		William Strickland																		
Coventry East																												Richard Crossman				
Coventry West																												Maurice Edelman				
Solihull																												Martin Alexander Lindsay				
Sutton Coldfield																												John Serocold Paget Mellor				
Tamworth	Henry Wilson-Fox				Percy Newson	Edward Mauger Iliffe						Arthur Steel-Maitland						John Serocold Paget Mellor														

=== 1950 to 1973 ===
==== Warwickshire ====
Conservative Labour Independent

Constituency	1950	51	52	53	54	1955	56	57	58	1959	60	61	62	63	1964	65	1966	67	68	69	1970	71	72	73
Nuneaton	Frank Bowles															Frank Cousins			Les Huckfield					
Rugby	James Johnson									Roy Wise							William George Price							
Stratford	John Profumo													Angus Maude										
Warwick and Leamington	Sir Anthony Eden							John Gardiner Sumner Hobson											Dudley Smith					

==== Herefordshire and Worcestershire ====
Conservative Labour

Constituency	1950	51	52	53	54	1955	56	57	58	1959	60	61	62	63	1964	65	1966	67	68	69	1970	71	72	73
Bromsgrove	Michael Higgs					James Dance																Terry Davis		
Hereford	James Purdon Lewes Thomas						James David Gibson-Watt																	
Kidderminster	Gerald Nabarro														Tatton Brinton									
Leominster	Archer Baldwin									Clive Bossom														
South Worcestershire	Rupert de la Bere					Peter Agnew											Gerald Nabarro							
Worcester	George Reginald Ward											Peter Edward Walker												

==== Staffordshire ====
Conservative Labour

Constituency	1950	51	52	53	54	1955	56	57	58	1959	60	61	62	63	1964	65	1966	67	68	69	1970	71	72	73
Burton	Arthur Colegate					John Jennings																		
Cannock	Jennie Lee Ashridge																				Patrick Cormack			
Leek	Harold Davies																				David Knox			
Lichfield & Tamworth	Julian Snow																				Jack d'Avigdor-Goldsmid			
Newcastle-under-Lyme	John David Mack	Stephen Swingler																		John Golding (British politician)				
Stafford & Stone	Hugh Fraser																							
Stoke on Trent Central	Barnett Stross																Robert Cant							
Stoke on Trent North	Albert Edward Davies			Harriet Slater													John Stuart Forrester							
Stoke on Trent South	Ellis Smith																Jack Ashley							

==== Shropshire ====
Conservative Labour

Constituency	1950	51	52	53	54	1955	56	57	58	1959	60	61	62	63	1964	65	1966	67	68	69	1970	71	72	73
Ludlow	Uvedale Shobdon Corbett	Christopher Holland-Martin									Jasper More													
Oswestry	David Ormsby-Gore									John Biffen														
Shrewsbury	John Langford-Holt																							
The Wrekin	Ivor Owen Thomas					William Yates											Gerry Fowler				Anthony Trafford			

==== Birmingham ====
Conservative Labour Liberal

Constituency	1950	51	52	53	54	1955	56	57	58	1959	60	61	62	63	1964	65	1966	67	68	69	1970	71	72	73
Birmingham All Saints						Denis Howell				John Harold Hollingworth					Brian Walden									
Birmingham Aston	Woodrow Wyatt					Julius Silverman																		
Birmingham Edgbaston	Sir Peter Bennett			Edith Pitt													Jill Knight							
Birmingham Erdington	Julius Silverman																							
Birmingham Hall Green	Aubrey Jones															Reginald Eyre								
Birmingham Handsworth	Edward Boyle																				Sydney Brooks Chapman			
Birmingham Kings Norton	Geoffrey Lloyd																							
Birmingham Ladywood	Victor Yates																			Wallace Lawler	Doris Fisher			
Birmingham Northfield	Raymond Blackburn	Donald Chapman																			Raymond John Carter			
Birmingham Perry Bar	Cecil Charles Poole					Charles Howell									Wyndham Davies		Christopher Price				Joseph Kinsey			
Birmingham Selly Oak						Tom Litterick																		
Birmingham Small Heath	Fred Longden		William Wheeldon									Denis Howell												
Birmingham Sparkbrook	Percy Shurmer									Leslie Seymour					Roy Hattersley									
Birmingham Stechford	Roy Jenkins																							
Birmingham Yardley	Henry Usborne									Leonard Cleaver					Ioan Evans						Derek Coombs			

==== Dudley ====
Conservative Labour

Constituency	1950	51	52	53	54	1955	56	57	58	1959	60	61	62	63	1964	65	1966	67	68	69	1970	71	72	73
Dudley	George Wigg																		Donald Williams		Arthur George Hooper			
Brierley Hill	Charles Simmons									John Talbot								Fergus Montgomery						
Oldbury and Halesowen	Arthur Moyle														John Horner						John Stokes			

==== Sutton Coldfield, Solihull, and Coventry ====
Conservative Labour

Constituency	1950	51	52	53	54	1955	56	57	58	1959	60	61	62	63	1964	65	1966	67	68	69	1970	71	72	73
Coventry East	Richard Crossman																							
Coventry North	Maurice Edelman																							
Coventry South	Elaine Burton									William Wilson					Maurice Edelman									
Meriden						Reg Moss				Gordon Matthews					Christopher Rowland				Keith Speed					
Sutton Coldfield	John Mellor					Geoffrey Lloyd																		
Solihull	Martin Lindsay														Percy Grieve									

=== 1974–96 ===
==== Warwickshire ====
Conservative Labour

Constituency	Feb 1974	Feb 1974	75	76	77	78	1979	80	81	82	1983	84	85	86	1987	88	89	90	91	1992	93	94	95	96
North Warwickshire											Francis Maude									Mike O'Brien				
Nuneaton	Les Huckfield										Lewis Stevens									Bill Olner				
Rugby	William Price						Jim Pawsey																	
Rugby and Kenilworth											Jim Pawsey													
Stratford-on-Avon	Angus Maude										Alan Thomas Howarth												Alan Thomas Howarth	
Warwick and Leamington	Dudley Smith																							

==== Herefordshire and Worcestershire ====
Conservative

Constituency	Feb 1974	Oct 1974	75	76	77	78	1979	80	81	82	1983	84	85	86	1987	88	89	90	91	1992	93	94	95	96
Bromsgrove											Hal Miller									Roy Thomason				
Bromsgrove and Redditch	Hal Miller																							
Hereford	Colin Shepherd																							
Kidderminster	Esmond Bulmer																							
Leominster	Peter Temple-Morris																							
Mid Worcestershire											Eric Forth													
Worcester	Peter Walker																			Peter Luff				
Worcestershire South	Michael Spicer																							
Wyre Forest											Esmond Bulmer				Anthony Michael Vincent Coombs									

==== Staffordshire ====
Conservative Labour

Constituency	Feb 1974	Oct 1974	75	76	77	78	1979	80	81	82	1983	84	85	86	1987	88	89	90	91	1992	93	94	95	96
Burton	Ivan Lawrence																							
Cannock	Gwilym Roberts																							
Cannock & Burntwood											Gerald Howarth									Tony Wright				
Leek	David Knox																							
Lichfield & Tamworth	Jack d'Avigdor-Goldsmid	Bruce Grocott					John Heddle																	
Mid Staffordshire											John Heddle							Sylvia Heal		Michael Fabricant				
Newcastle-under-Lyme	John Golding													Llinos Golding										
South East Staffordshire											David Lightbown													Brian Jenkins
South Staffordshire											Patrick Cormack													
South West Staffordshire	Patrick Cormack																							
Stafford											Hugh Fraser	Bill Cash												
Stafford & Stone	Hugh Fraser																							
Staffordshire Moorlands											David Knox													
Stoke on Trent North	John Forrester														Joan Walley									
Stoke on Trent South	Jack Ashley																			George Stevenson				
Stoke on Trent Central	Robert Cant										Mark Fisher													

==== Shropshire ====
Conservative Labour

Constituency	Feb 1974	Oct 1974	75	76	77	78	1979	80	81	82	1983	84	85	86	1987	88	89	90	91	1992	93	94	95	96
Ludlow	Jasper More						Eric Cockeram								Christopher Gill									
North Shropshire											John Biffen													
Oswestry	John Biffen																							
Shrewsbury	John Langford-Holt																							
Shrewsbury and Atcham											Derek Conway													
The Wrekin	Gerry Fowler						Warren Hawksley								Bruce Grocott									

==== Birmingham ====
Conservative Labour

Constituency	Feb 1974	Oct 1974	75	76	77	78	1979	80	81	82	1983	84	85	86	1987	88	89	90	91	1992	93	94	95	96
Birmingham Edgbaston	Jill Knight																							
Birmingham Erdington	Julius Silverman										Robin Corbett													
Birmingham Hall Green	Reginald Eyre										Andrew Raikes Hargreaves													
Birmingham Handsworth	John Lee						Sheila Wright																	
Birmingham Hodge Hill											Terry Davis													
Birmingham Ladywood	Brian Walden				John Sever						Clare Short													
Birmingham Northfield	Raymond John Carter						Jocelyn Cadbury			John Spellar	Roger King									Richard Burden				
Birmingham Perry Bar	Jeff Rooker																							
Birmingham Selly Oak	Tom Litterick						Anthony Beaumont-Dark													Lynne Jones				
Birmingham Small Heath	Denis Howell																			Roger Godsiff				
Birmingham Sparkbrook	Roy Hattersley																							
Birmingham Stechford	Roy Jenkins				Andrew James MacKay		Terence Anthony Gordon Davis																	
Birmingham Yardley	Syd Tierney						David Gilroy Bevan													Estelle Morris				

==== Dudley ====
Conservative Labour

Constituency	Feb 1974	Oct 1974	75	76	77	78	1979	80	81	82	1983	84	85	86	1987	88	89	90	91	1992	93	94	95	96
Dudley West	Colin Phipps						John Graham Blackburn															Ian Pearson		
Dudley East	John William Gilbert																							
Halesowen and Stourbridge	John Stokes																			Warren Hawksley				

==== Sutton Coldfield, Solihull, and Coventry ====
Conservative Labour

Constituency	Feb 1974	Oct 1974	75	76	77	78	1979	80	81	82	1983	84	85	86	1987	88	89	90	91	1992	93	94	95	96
Coventry North East	George Park														John Hughes					Bob Ainsworth				
Coventry North West	Maurice Edelman		Geoffrey Robinson																					
Coventry South East	William Wilson										Dave Nellist									Jim Cunningham				
Coventry South West	Audrey Wise						John Butcher																	
Meriden	John Tomlinson						Iain Mills																	
Sutton Coldfield	Norman Fowler																							
Solihull	Percy Grieve										John Taylor													

=== 1997-present ===
==== Warwickshire ====
Conservative Labour Liberal Democrats

Constituency	1997	98	99	00	2001	02	03	04	2005	06	07	08	09	2010	11	12	13	14	2015	16	2017	18	2019	20	21	22	23	2024	25	26
Kenilworth and Southam														Jeremy Wright																
North Warwickshire																												Rachel Taylor		
North Warwickshire and Bedworth	Mike O'Brien													Dan Byles					Craig Tracey											
Nuneaton	Bill Olner													Marcus Jones														Jodie Gosling		
Rugby														Mark Pawsey														John Slinger		
Rugby and Kenilworth	Andy King								Jeremy Wright																					
Stratford-on-Avon	John Maples													Nadhim Zahawi														Manuela Perteghella		
Warwick and Leamington	James Plaskitt													Chris White							Matt Western									

==== Herefordshire and Worcestershire ====
Conservative Labour Liberal Democrats Independent Conservative Green Party Independent Kidderminster Hospital and Health Concern

Constituency	1997	98	99	00	2001	02	03	04	2005	06	07	08	09	2010	11	12	13	14	2015	16	2017	18	2019	20	21	22	23	2024	25	26
Bromsgrove	Julie Kirkbride													Sajid Javid														Bradley Thomas		
Droitwich and Evesham																												Nigel Huddleston		
Redditch	Jacqui Smith													Karen Lumley							Rachel Maclean							Chris Bloore		
Hereford	Paul Keetch																													
Hereford and South Herefordshire														Jesse Norman																
Leominster	Peter Temple-Morris	→			Bill Wiggin																									
Mid Worcestershire	Peter Luff																		Nigel Huddleston											
North Herefordshire														Bill Wiggin														Ellie Chowns		
West Worcestershire	Sir Michael Spicer													Harriett Baldwin																
Worcester	Mike Foster													Robin Walker														Tom Collins		
Wyre Forest	David Lock				Richard Taylor									Mark Garnier																

==== Staffordshire ====
Conservative Labour

Constituency	1997	98	99	00	2001	02	03	04	2005	06	07	08	09	2010	11	12	13	14	2015	16	2017	18	2019	20	21	22	23	2024	25	26
Burton	Janet Dean													Andrew Griffiths									Kate Kniveton							
Burton & Uttoxeter																												Jacob Collier		
Cannock Chase	Tony Wright													Aidan Burley					Amanda Milling									Josh Newbury		
Kingswinford and South Staffordshire																												Mike Wood		
Lichfield	Michael Fabricant																											Dave Robertson		
Newcastle-under-Lyme	Llinos Golding				Paul Farrelly																		Aaron Bell					Adam Jogee		
South Staffordshire	Patrick Cormack													Gavin Williamson																
Stafford	David Kidney													Jeremy Lefroy									Theodora Clarke					Leigh Ingham		
Stone	Bill Cash																													
Stone, Great Wyrley and Penkridge																												Gavin Williamson		
Staffordshire Moorlands	Charlotte Atkins													Karen Bradley																
Stoke on Trent North	Joan Walley																		Ruth Smeeth				Jonathan Gullis					David Williams		
Stoke on Trent South	George Stevenson								Rob Flello												Jack Brereton							Allison Gardner		
Stoke on Trent Central	Mark Fisher													Tristram Hunt							Gareth Snell		Jo Gideon					Gareth Snell		
Tamworth	Brian Jenkins													Chris Pincher													Sarah Edwards			

==== Shropshire ====
Conservative Labour Liberal Democrats

Constituency	1997	98	99	00	2001	02	03	04	2005	06	07	08	09	2010	11	12	13	14	2015	16	2017	18	2019	20	21	22	23	2024	25	26
Ludlow	Christopher Gill				Matthew Green				Philip Dunne																					
North Shropshire	Owen Paterson																								Helen Morgan					
Shrewsbury																												Julia Buckley		
Shrewsbury and Atcham	Paul Marsden				→				Daniel Kawczynski																					
South Shropshire																												Stuart Anderson		
Telford	Bruce Grocott				David Wright														Lucy Allan									Shaun Davies		
The Wrekin	Peter Bradley								Mark Pritchard																					

==== Birmingham ====
Conservative Labour Liberal Democrats Independent

Constituency	1997	98	99	00	2001	02	03	04	2005	06	07	08	09	2010	11	12	13	14	2015	16	2017	18	2019	20	21	22	23	2024	25	26
Birmingham Edgbaston	Gisela Stuart																				Preet Gill									
Birmingham Erdington	Robin Corbett				Siôn Simon									Jack Dromey												Paulette Hamilton				
Birmingham Hall Green	Steve McCabe													Roger Godsiff									Tahir Ali							
Birmingham Hall Green and Moseley																												Tahir Ali		
Birmingham Hodge Hill	Terry Davis							Liam Byrne																						
Birmingham Hodge Hill and Solihull North																												Liam Byrne		
Birmingham Ladywood	Clare Short									→				Shabana Mahmood																
Birmingham Northfield	Richard Burden																						Gary Sambrook					Laurence Turner		
Birmingham Perry Bar	Jeff Rooker				Khalid Mahmood																							Ayoub Khan		
Birmingham Selly Oak	Lynne Jones													Steve McCabe														Al Carns		
Birmingham Sparkbrook and Small Heath	Roger Godsiff																													
Birmingham Yardley	Estelle Morris								John Hemming										Jess Phillips											

==== Dudley ====
Conservative Labour

Constituency	1997	98	99	00	2001	02	03	04	2005	06	07	08	09	2010	11	12	13	14	2015	16	2017	18	2019	20	21	22	23	2024	25	26
Dudley																												Sonia Kumar		
Dudley North	Ross Cranston								Ian Austin														Marco Longhi							
Dudley South	Ian Pearson													Chris Kelly					Mike Wood											
Stourbridge	Debra Shipley								Lynda Waltho					Margot James									Suzanne Webb					Cat Eccles		

==== Sutton Coldfield, Solihull, and Coventry ====
Conservative Labour Liberal Democrats Your Independent

Constituency	1997	98	99	00	2001	02	03	04	2005	06	07	08	09	2010	11	12	13	14	2015	16	2017	18	2019	20	21	22	23	2024	25	26
Coventry East																												Mary Creagh		
Coventry North East	Bob Ainsworth																		Colleen Fletcher											
Coventry North West	Geoffrey Robinson																						Taiwo Owatemi							
Coventry South	Jim Cunningham																						Zarah Sultana						→	→
Meriden	Caroline Spelman																						Saqib Bhatti							
Meriden and Solihull East																												Saqib Bhatti		
Sutton Coldfield	Norman Fowler				Andrew Mitchell																									
Solihull	John Taylor								Lorely Burt										Julian Knight							→				
Solihull West and Shirley																												Neil Shastri-Hurst		

== 2024 results ==
The number of votes cast for each political party who fielded candidates in constituencies comprising the West Midlands region in the 2024 general election were as follows:

Party	Votes	%	Change from 2019	Seats	Change from 2019 (actual)	Change from 2019 (notional)
Labour	824,433	34.0	▲0.1	38	▲23	▲24
Conservative	669,368	27.6	▼25.8	15	▼29	▼28
Reform UK	439,278	18.1	▲16.8	0	0	0
Liberal Democrats	214,493	8.8	▲1.0	2	▲2	▲2
Green	159,140	6.6	▲3.6	1	▲1	▲1
Others	119,145	4.9	▲4.4	1	▲1	▲1
Total	2,425,857	100.0		57	▼2	

== Results history ==
Primary data source: House of Commons research briefing – General election results from 1918 to 2019

=== Percentage votes ===
West Midlands votes %

Key:

- CON – Conservative Party, including National Liberal Party up to 1966
- LAB – Labour Party, including Labour and Co-operative party
- LIB – Liberal Party up to 1979; SDP-Liberal Alliance 1983 & 1987; Liberal Democrats from 1992
- UKIP – UK Independence Party 2010 to 2017 (included in Other up to 2005 and from 2019)
- REF – Reform UK (2019 – Brexit Party)
- GRN – Green Party of England and Wales (included in Other up to 2005)

=== Seats ===
West Midlands seats won

Key:

- CON – Conservative Party, including National Liberal Party up to 1966
- LAB – Labour Party, including Labour and Co-operative party
- LIB – Liberal Party up to 1979; SDP-Liberal Alliance 1983 & 1987; Liberal Democrats from 1992
- GRN – Green Party of England and Wales
- OTH – 1945 – Independent (William Brown); 1997 – Speaker (Betty Boothroyd); 2001 & 2005 – Independent Community & Health Concern (Dr Richard Taylor); 2024 – Independent (Ayoub Khan)

== See also ==
- List of United Kingdom Parliament constituencies
- Parliamentary constituencies in Herefordshire and Worcestershire
- Parliamentary constituencies in Shropshire
- Parliamentary constituencies in Staffordshire
- Parliamentary constituencies in Warwickshire
- Parliamentary constituencies in the West Midlands (county)
