= Parliamentary constituencies in Herefordshire and Worcestershire =

There are 8 Parliamentary constituencies in the ceremonial counties of Herefordshire and Worcestershire. From 1974 to 1998 the two counties were administratively and ceremonially one, called Hereford and Worcester, and the constituencies crossed the traditional county boundaries. This continued to be the case up to and including the 2005 general election, but since the 2010 general election two constituencies fall entirely within Herefordshire and six within Worcestershire. There is one borough constituency in Worcestershire; the remaining are county constituencies.

== Constituencies ==
Conservative † Green ¥ Labour ‡ Liberal Democrat ¤

The location of Herefordshire relative to England.

=== Herefordshire ===
Name (Note: BC denotes borough constituency, CC denotes county constituency.)	Electorate	Majority (Note: The majority is the number of votes the winning candidate receives more than their nearest rival.)	Member of Parliament	Nearest opposition	Map
Hereford and South Herefordshire CC	72,203	1,279	Jesse Norman †	Joseph Emmett ‡	Map showing the location of the Hereford and South Herefordshire constituency in Herefordshire under the boundaries created by the 2023 boundary review and first used at the 2024 general election.
North Herefordshire CC	72,797	5,894	Ellie Chowns ¥	Bill Wiggin †	Map showing the location of the North Herefordshire constituency in Herefordshire under the boundaries created by the 2023 boundary review and first used at the 2024 general election.

The location of Worcestershire relative to England.

=== Worcestershire ===
Name (Note: BC denotes borough constituency, CC denotes county constituency.)	Electorate	Majority (Note: The majority is the number of votes the winning candidate receives more than their nearest rival.)	Member of Parliament	Nearest opposition	Map
Bromsgrove CC	76,468	3,016	Bradley Thomas †	Neena Gill ‡	Map showing the location of the Bromsgrove constituency in Worcestershire under the boundaries created by the 2023 boundary review and first used at the 2024 general election.
Droitwich and Evesham CC	76,624	8,995	Nigel Huddleston †	Chipiliro Kalebe-Nyamongo ‡	Map showing the location of the Droitwich and Evesham constituency in Worcestershire under the boundaries created by the 2023 boundary review and first used at the 2024 general election.
Redditch CC	71,038	789	Chris Bloore ‡	Rachel Maclean †	Map showing the location of the Redditch constituency in Worcestershire under the boundaries created by the 2023 boundary review and first used at the 2024 general election.
West Worcestershire CC	79,242	6,547	Harriett Baldwin †	Dan Boatright ¤	Map showing the location of the West Worcestershire constituency in Worcestershire under the boundaries created by the 2023 boundary review and first used at the 2024 general election.
Worcester BC	74,931	7,116	Tom Collins ‡	Marc Bayliss †	Map showing the location of the Worcester constituency in Worcestershire under the boundaries created by the 2023 boundary review and first used at the 2024 general election.
Wyre Forest CC	77,394	812	Mark Garnier †	Vicki Smith ‡	Map showing the location of the Wyre Forest constituency in Worcestershire under the boundaries created by the 2023 boundary review and first used at the 2024 general election.

== Boundary changes ==
=== 2024 ===
See 2023 review of Westminster constituencies for further details.

Name	Boundaries 2010–2024	Boundaries 2024–present
Herefordshire: 1. Hereford and South Herefordshire CC; 2. North Herefordshire CC	Numbered map of the new Parliamentary constituencies of Herefordshire.	Numbered map of the parliamentary constituencies of Herefordshire created by the 2023 boundary review and first used at the 2024 UK general election.
Worcestershire: 3. Bromsgrove CC; 4. Mid Worcestershire CC / Droitwich and Evesham CC; 5. Redditch CC; 6. West Worcestershire CC; 7. Worcester BC; 8. Wyre Forest CC	Numbered map of new parliamentary constituencies of Worcestershire.	Numbered map of the parliamentary constituencies of Worcestershire created by the 2023 boundary review and first used at the 2024 UK general election.

For the 2023 review of Westminster constituencies, which redrew the constituency map ahead of the 2024 United Kingdom general election, the Boundary Commission for England opted to retain the two constituencies in Herefordshire, with minor boundary changes to reflect changes to ward boundaries. In Worcestershire, it proposed a small transfer from Mid Worcestershire (renamed Droitwich and Evesham) to Redditch to bring these two constituencies within the statutory range; the other four constituencies were unchanged.

=== 2010 ===
Under the fifth periodic review of Westminster constituencies, the Boundary Commission for England decided to retain 8 constituencies covering the counties of Herefordshire and Worcestershire for the 2010 election, making minor changes to take account of the separation of the two counties, to realign constituency boundaries with the boundaries of current local government wards, and to reduce the electoral disparity between constituencies. The constituencies of Hereford and Leominster were renamed Hereford and South Herefordshire, and North Herefordshire respectively.

Name 1997–2010	Boundaries 1997–2010	Name 2010–2024	Boundaries 2010–2024
Wholly or mainly in Herefordshire: 1. Hereford CC; 2. Leominster CC; Wholly in Worcestershire: 3. Bromsgrove CC; 4. Mid Worcestershire CC; 5. Redditch BC; 6. West Worcestershire CC; 7. Worcester BC; 8. Wyre Forest CC	Parliamentary constituencies in Herefordshire and Worcestershire	Herefordshire: 1. Hereford and South Herefordshire CC; 2. North Herefordshire CC; Worcestershire: 3. Bromsgrove CC; 4. Mid Worcestershire CC; 5. Redditch CC; 6. West Worcestershire CC; 7. Worcester BC; 8. Wyre Forest CC	Proposed Revision

== Results history ==
Primary data source: House of Commons research briefing - General election results from 1918 to 2019

=== 2024 ===
The number of votes cast for each political party who fielded candidates in constituencies comprising Herefordshire and Worcestershire in the 2024 general election were as follows:

Party	Votes	%	Change from 2019	Seats	Change from 2019
Conservative	127,020	33.1%	▼28.7%	5	▼3
Labour	96,738	25.2%	▲3.4%	2	▲2
Reform UK	68,306	17.8%	new	0	0
Greens	44,812	11.7%	▲7.1%	1	▲1
Liberal Democrats	41,479	10.8%	▼0.7%	0	0
Others	5,849	1.5%	▲1.2%	0	0
Total	384,204	100.0		8	

=== 2019 ===
The number of votes cast for each political party who fielded candidates in constituencies comprising Herefordshire and Worcestershire in the 2019 general election were as follows:

Party	Votes	%	Change from 2017	Seats	Change from 2017
Conservative	256,014	61.8%	▲3.7%	8	0
Labour	90,230	21.8%	▼7.1%	0	0
Liberal Democrats	47,798	11.5%	▲5.3%	0	0
Greens	18,866	4.6%	▲2.0%	0	0
Others	1,222	0.3%	▼3.9%	0	0
Total	414,130	100.0		8	

=== Percentage votes ===
Election year	1983	1987	1992	1997	2001	2005	2010	2015	2017	2019	2024
Conservative	52.3	51.8	50.8	41.0	41.1	42.9	45.9	51.7	58.1	61.8	33.1
Labour	15.3	17.9	24.6	32.6	27.4	24.5	16.7	19.7	28.9	21.8	25.2
Liberal Democrat^{1}	31.4	29.7	23.1	21.9	19.4	21.8	25.3	6.7	6.2	11.5	10.8
Green Party	-	*	*	*	*	*	1.0	4.5	2.6	4.6	11.7
UKIP	-	-	-	*	*	*	4.2	15.4	2.1	*	-
Reform UK	-	-	-	-	-	-	-	-	-	-	17.8
Other	1.0	0.6	1.5	4.5	12.1	10.8	6.8	1.9	2.1	0.3	1.5

^{1}1983 & 1987 - SDP–Liberal Alliance

* Included in Other

=== Seats ===
Election year	1983	1987	1992	1997	2001	2005	2010	2015	2017	2019	2024
Conservative	7	7	7	4	4	4	8	8	8	8	5
Green	0	0	0	0	0	0	0	0	0	0	1
Labour	0	0	0	3	2	2	0	0	0	0	2
Liberal Democrat^{1}	0	0	0	1	1	1	0	0	0	0	0
Independent^{2}	-	-	-	-	1	1	0	-	-	-	-
Total	7	7	7	8	8	8	8	8	8	8	8

^{1}1983 & 1987 - SDP–Liberal Alliance

^{2}Dr Richard Taylor, standing as the Independent Kidderminster Hospital and Health Concern candidate

=== Maps ===
==== 1885–1910 ====
1885

1886

1892

1895

1900

1906

Jan 1910

Dec 1910

==== 1918–1945 ====
1918

1922

1923

1924

1929

1931

1935

1945

==== 1950–1979 ====
1950

1951

1955

1959

1964

1966

1970

Feb 1974

Oct 1974

1979

==== 1983–2005 – Hereford and Worcester ====
1983

1987

1992

1997

2001

2005

==== 2010–present ====
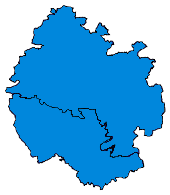
2010

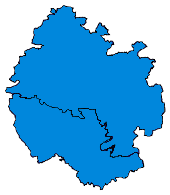
2015

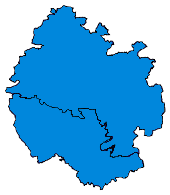
2017

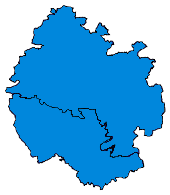
2019

2024

== Timeline ==
Green represents former constituencies, pink is for current ones.

=== Worcestershire ===
Constituency	1295–1554	1554–1604	1604–1605	1605–1832	1832–1885	1885–1918	1918–1950	1950–1974	1974–1983	1983–1997	1997–present
Bewdley				1605–1950							
Bromsgrove								1950–1974		1983–present	
Bromsgrove and Redditch									1974–1983		
Droitwich		1554–1918									
Dudley					1832–1974						
East Worcestershire					1832–1918						
Evesham			1604–1950								
Kidderminster					1832–1983						
Mid Worcestershire										1983–present	
North Worcestershire						1885–1918					
Oldbury and Halesowen								1950–1974			
Redditch										1983–present	
South Worcestershire								1950–1997			
Stourbridge							1918–1974		In West Midlands		
West Worcestershire					1832–1885						1997–present
Worcester	1295–present										
Worcestershire	1295–1832										
Wyre Forest										1983–present	

=== Herefordshire ===
Constituency	1295–1628	1628–1832	1832–1885	1885–1918	1918–2010	2010–present
Hereford	1295–2010					
Hereford and South Herefordshire						2010–present
Herefordshire	1295–1832					
Leominster	1295–2010					
North Herefordshire						2010–present
Ross				1885–1918		
Weobley		1628–1832				

== Historical representation by party ==
A cell marked → (with a different colour background to the preceding cell) indicates that the previous MP continued to sit under a new party name.

=== 1885 to 1918 ===
Conservative Liberal Liberal Unionist

Constituency	1885	1886	92	1892	93	95	1895	1900	03	1906	08	Jan 1910	Dec 1910	12	14	16	18
Hereford	J. Pulley	Bailey		Grenfell	Cooke			Arkwright						Hewins			
Leominster	Duckham	Rankin								Lamb		Rankin		Wright			
Ross	Biddulph	→						Clive		Gardner	Clive			→			C. Pulley
Bewdley	Lechmere			A. Baldwin							S. Baldwin						
Droitwich	Corbett	→		Martin						Harmsworth		Lyttelton		→		Whiteley	
Dudley	Sheridan	Robinson								Hooper			Griffith-Boscawen				
Evesham	Temple			Lechmere		Long						Eyres-Monsell					
Kidderminster	Brinton	Godson								Barnard		Knight					
Worcester	Allsopp									Williamson	Goulding						
Worcestershire East	Hastings	→	Chamberlain											→	Harris		
Worcestershire North	Hingley	→		→			Wilson		→								

=== 1918 to 1950 ===
Conservative Independent Labour Liberal

Constituency	1918	21	1922	1923	1924	27	1929	31	1931	1935	37	41	1945
Hereford	Pulley	Roberts					Owen		Thomas				
Leominster	Ward-Jackson		Shepperson										A. E. Baldwin
Bewdley	S. Baldwin										Conant		
Dudley	Griffith-Boscawen	J. Wilson	Lloyd				O. Baldwin	→	Joel			Lloyd	Wigg
Evesham	Eyres-Monsell									de la Bere			
Kidderminster	Knight		Wardlaw-Milne										Tolley
Stourbridge	J. W. Wilson		Pielou			Wellock			Morgan				Moyle
Worcester	Goulding		Fairbairn	Greene									Ward

=== 1950 to 1983 ===
The West Midlands Order 1965 transferred the Dudley area from Worcestershire to Staffordshire and part of the Warley area from Staffordshire to Worcestershire. These changes were incorporated into the new constituency boundaries for the February 1974 general election.

Conservative Labour

Constituency	1950	1951	1955	56	1959	61	1964	1966	68	1970	71	Feb 1974	Oct 1974	1979
Hereford	Thomas			Gibson-Watt									Shepherd	
Leominster	Baldwin				Bossom							Temple-Morris		
Bromsgrove / Bromsgrove and Redditch (1974)	Higgs		Dance								Davis	Miller		
Kidderminster	Nabarro						Brinton					Bulmer		
Oldbury and Halesowen / Halesowen and Stourbridge (1974)	Moyle						Horner			Stokes				
Worcester	Ward					Walker								
Worcestershire South	de la Bere		Agnew					Nabarro				Spicer		
Dudley	Wigg								Williams	Gilbert				
Warley West												Archer		
Warley East												Faulds		

=== 1983 to present ===
Conservative Green Health Concern Independent Conservative Labour Liberal Democrats

Constituency	1983	1987	1992	1997	97	98	2001	2005	2010	2015	2017	2019	2024
Hereford / Hereford and South Herefordshire (2010)	Shepherd			Keetch					Norman				
Leominster / North Herefordshire (2010)	Temple-Morris				→	→	Wiggin						Chowns
Bromsgrove	Miller		Thomason	Kirkbride					Javid				Thomas
Mid Worcestershire / Droitwich & Evesham (2024)	Forth			Luff						Huddleston			
South Worcestershire / West Worcestershire (1997)	Spicer								Baldwin				
Worcester	P. Walker		Luff	Foster					R. Walker				Collins
Wyre Forest	Bulmer	Coombs		Lock			Taylor		Garnier				
Redditch				Smith					Lumley		Maclean		Bloore

== See also ==
- List of parliamentary constituencies in the West Midlands (region)
