= Brook Robinson =

Brook Robinson may refer to:

- Brooke Robinson (1836–1911), British politician
- Brooks Robinson (1937–2023), American baseball player
