= Dudley Museum and Art Gallery =

Former museum and art gallery in Dudley, England

Coordinates: 52.511716°N 2.086126°W

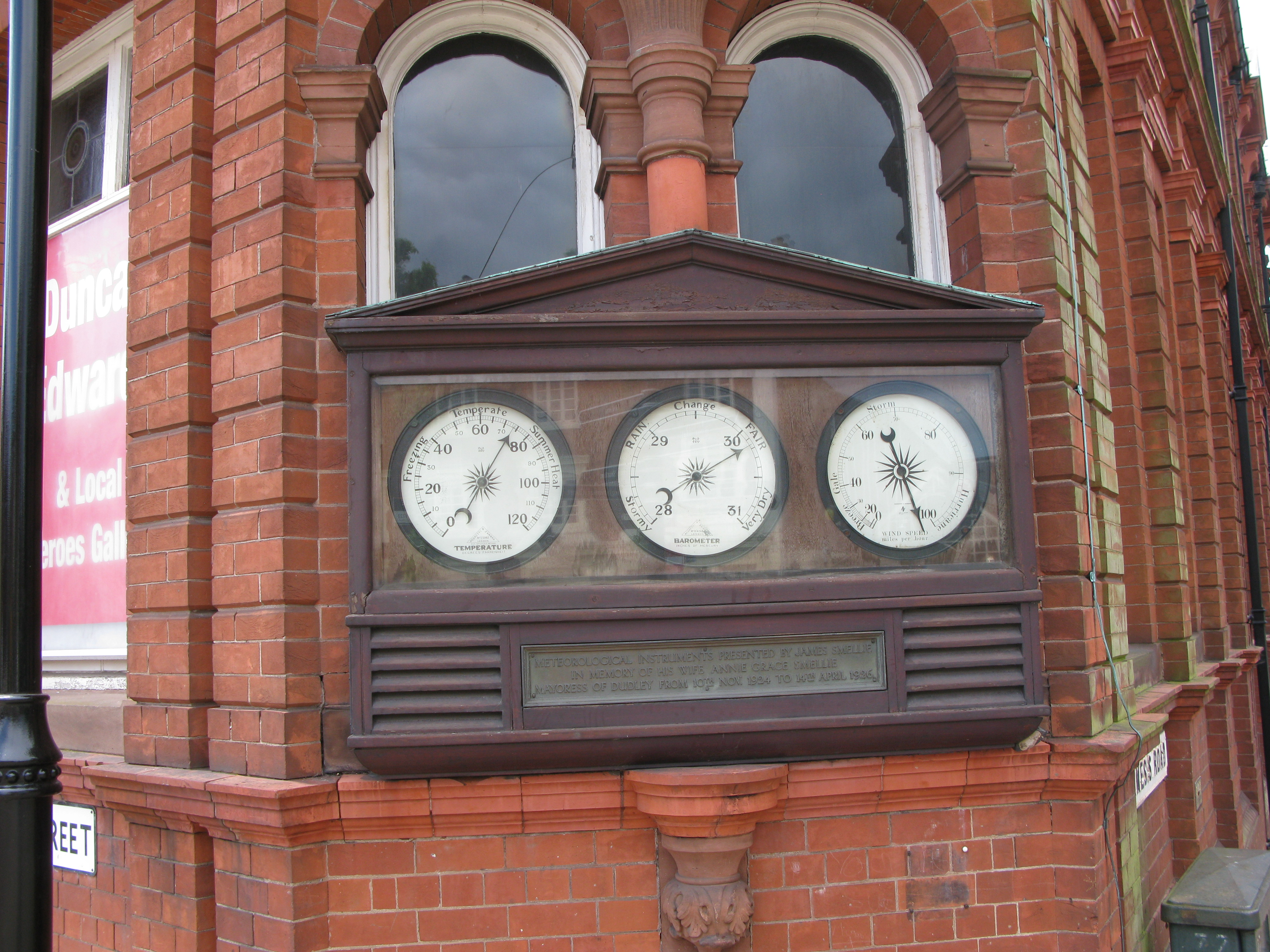
- Meteorological instrument display on the corner of the former Dudley Museum. The dedication plaque has since been removed due to vandalism.

- Location within West Midlands county
- Established: 3 July 1883
- Dissolved: 22 December 2016
- Location: Dudley, West Midlands
- Type: Natural history and local interest

Dudley Museum and Art Gallery was a public museum and art gallery located in the town centre of Dudley in the West Midlands, England. It was opened in 1883, situated within buildings on St James's Road, and remained at that site until its closure in 2016. Some of the museum collections have since been relocated to the Dudley Archives centre on Tipton Road.

It is not to be confused with the Dudley Gallery in London, a large room inside the Egyptian Hall, on Piccadilly which was an important space for art exhibitions between 1812 and 1905, used by the Royal Watercolour Society and others. When the Egyptian Hall was demolished in 1905 it moved to Mill Street, off Conduit Street, as the "New Dudley Gallery".

== History ==
The building was originally planned as a Free Library and School of Art by Dudley Borough Council. The foundation stone was laid on 3 July 1883 by Earl Beauchamp, the Lord Lieutenant of Worcestershire. Although an art gallery was included in the design, it did not open for another five years; the gallery was officially opened on 1 August 1888 by Mayor of Dudley Benjamin Hingley.

In 1906, Dudley Council entered an agreement with the Dudley Geographical Society to take over their collection of fossils and other materials with a view to displaying them in a museum in the town. In 1911, it was announced that this collection had been installed in what had been the lending department of the Free Library with a view of displaying it to the public in 1912.

The Brooke Robinson collection, bequeathed to the town by former MP and coroner for Dudley, Brooke Robinson, and originally kept in a purpose-built room in the nearby town hall, was moved to the museum in 1979.

=== Closure and movement of collection ===
The Museum and Art Gallery was closed by Dudley Council on 22 December 2016 as part of cost-cutting efforts. A portion of the museum collection was later moved to the Dudley Archives centre on Tipton Road, under the name 'Dudley Museum at The Archives', opening to the public in September 2017. The new facility also houses the organisational headquarters of the aspiring Black Country Geopark, a project organised by local councils in an attempt to achieve UNESCO Geopark status for the region's geological heritage.

== Permanent exhibitions ==
=== Geology ===
The geology exhibits were the 'most important collection' at the museum and were drawn from a collection of approximately 15,000 fossils from the local area including nearby Wren's Nest hill and Wren's Nest. The two geology exhibits are 'Dudley Unearthed' and 'Fantastic Fossils'.

The 'Dudley Unearthed' area contained a set of interpretative displays that related the geology of the area to the history of the industrial revolution, with regularly changing features on the geology of both the local area and the rest of the world, including information on Dudley Volcano. Fossils formed by the eruption of the volcano around 315 million years ago are also on display.

'Fantastic Fossils' showcased Silurian and Carboniferous fossils, with examples of fossilised corals and shellfish, Crinoids, Gastropods, Trilobites, Cephalopods, worm tubes and fossilised specimens from the forest canopy and ground covering and primitive plants.

=== Return of the Dinosaurs ===
'Return of the Dinosaurs' opened in 2007 and was distinguished by several large models of various species of dinosaurs, including Baryonyx and one of the earliest dinosaurs, Thecodontosaurus.

=== The Brooke Robinson Museum ===
In 1911, local MP Brooke Robinson bequeathed his collection of paintings, furniture, ceramics, enamels and medals to Dudley. The objects were on display in a dedicated room in the museum which contained a miscellaneous collection of 17th, 18th and 19th century British and European paintings, furniture and ceramics, together with oriental ceramics, Japanese netsuke and inro, Bilston enamels, commemorative medals, Greek, Roman and Egyptian pottery and personal memorabilia relating to Brooke Robinson and his two wives.

=== Duncan Edwards and local heroes ===
The room featured a great deal of memorabilia connected to local football legend and Busby Babe Duncan Edwards, who was born in the town in 1936, and won two Football League title medals with Manchester United and was capped 18 times by the England national football team until he died from injuries sustained in the Munich air disaster in February 1958, when still only 21. There were plans to introduce other local sporting heroes.

=== Fine art collection ===
The museum also held a large collection of fine art, including oil paintings, watercolours, and prints, which were rotated in and out of display. Among these were works by local artist Percy Shakespeare.
