= Alfred Rhodes Bristow =

British politician

Member of Parliament for Kidderminster
- In office 30 April 1859 – 27 May 1862
- Preceded by: Robert Lowe
- Succeeded by: Luke white

Personal details
- Born: 20 December 1819 Greenwich, Kent
- Died: 5 April 1875 (aged 58–59) Sydenham, Kent
- Party: Liberal

Alfred Rhodes Bristow (20 December 1819 – 5 April 1875) was a British Liberal politician.

He was the son of Government contractor Isaac Bristow and educated at King's College, London. He became a solicitor in 1842 and was head of the firm of Bristow and Tarrant.

Bristow was elected Liberal MP for Kidderminster at the 1859 general election and held the seat until 1862, when he resigned, becoming Steward of the Chiltern Hundreds in order to take up a Crown office as Solicitor to the Admiralty.

He died at Sydenham railway station.

Parliament of the United Kingdom
Preceded by Robert Lowe	Member of Parliament for Kidderminster; 1859–1862	Succeeded by Luke White
