= John Best (British politician) =

John Best (1821 – 18 June 1865) was a British barrister and Peelite politician.

Best was the son of W B Best, and was born in Kidderminster, Worcestershire. He was educated at Shrewsbury School before graduating from Peterhouse, Cambridge in 1844. He was called to the bar at the Inner Temple in 1846, and practised on the Oxford Circuit. He was a counsel to the Palace Court from 1847 until its abolition in 1849. On 5 September 1849 he was elected to the House of Commons as Peelite Member of Parliament (MP) for Kidderminster. He stood as Conservative at the next general election in 1852, but was unseated by his Liberal opponent, Robert Lowe.

Best married Mary Smith of Ismere House, Worcestershire in April 1848. He died in Llandudno, North Wales in June 1865, aged 44.

Parliament of the United Kingdom
Preceded by Richard Godson	Member of Parliament for Kidderminster; 1849–1852	Succeeded by Robert Lowe
