= 1874 Dudley by-election =

UK Parliamentary by-election

The 1874 Dudley by-election was fought on 21 May 1874 shortly after the February General Election, which had brought about the re-election of the Liberal MP Henry Brinsley Sheridan. The election was declared void 4 May 1874, triggering a by-election. Sheridan had been first elected as the Member of Parliament (MP) for Dudley in 1857. At the subsequent by-election held on 21 May 1874, he was again returned, defeating the ironmaster, Noah Hingley.

By-election, 21 May 1874: Dudley
Party	Candidate	Votes	%	±%
Liberal	Henry Brinsley Sheridan	5,607	53.4	−1.8
Conservative	Noah Hingley	4,889	46.6	+1.8
Majority		718	6.8	−3.6
Turnout		10,496	71.9	+8.0
Registered electors		14,593		
Liberal hold		Swing	-1.8	
