= John Brinton =

British politician

Brinton in 1880

John Brinton (25 January 1827 – 2 July 1914) was an English carpet manufacturer and a Liberal politician.

Brinton was born at Kidderminster, the son of Henry Brinton a carpet manufacturer. He joined the family carpet manufacturing firm John Brinton & Co as a partner in 1848. Brintons had a large factory at Stourport a town noted for its carpet manufacture. In time he became chairman of Brintons Ltd. He became J.P. for Kidderminster in 1856 and was chairman of the Kidderminster School of Art from 1863 to 1869. In 1866 he was made Chevalier of the Legion of Honour for France. Sometime before 1871 he purchased Moor Park at Stourport. There he carried out considerable alterations to the house and grounds, planting an avenue of trees from Lickhill Road to Bewdley Road (Avenue Road) and erecting three pairs of ornamental iron gates.

Brinton became a member of King Charles I School Kidderminster School Board in 1871, remaining until 1888. He became J.P. for Worcestershire in 1876. He was vice chairman of Board of Guardians to 1880 and chairman from 1880 to 1894. He was also chairman of the Carpet Manufacturers Association for 14 years.

Brinton was elected member of parliament for Kidderminster in 1880 but accepted the Chiltern Hundreds next month because he was holding a government contract at the time. He was reelected without opposition and held the seat until 1886. In 1887 he presented Brinton Park to Borough of Kidderminster. He became High Sheriff of Worcestershire in 1889 and was an Alderman of the County Council from 1890.

Brinton married four times and had fourteen children of whom eleven survived into adulthood . His first wife was Ann Oldham from Dublin whom he married on 1853. She died in 1863 having borne five children. He married Mary Chaytor of Limerick in 1865. They had another nine children. Their son Reginald Brinton, who played cricket for Worcestershire became chairman of Brintons on the death of his father in 1914. Another son Percival Brinton also played cricket for Worcestershire. Mary Chator died in 1887 and John Brinton married Mary Allen (née Gething) in 1891. After her death in 1903 he was married for the fourth time to Mary Eliza Fisher, in 1910.

Brinton died at Moor Park at the age of 87.

Parliament of the United Kingdom
Preceded by Sir William Fraser	Member of Parliament for Kidderminster; 1880–1886	Succeeded by Sir Augustus Godson
Honorary titles
Preceded by	High Sheriff of Worcestershire; 1889	Succeeded by
