= Henry Brinsley Sheridan =

English politician (1820–1906)

Henry Brinsley Sheridan (1820 – 19 April 1906) was an English Liberal Party politician who sat in the House of Commons between 1857 and 1886, representing Dudley. He was also a Fellow of the Royal Geographical Society, a magistrate, and a captain of the 6th Cinque Port Artillery Volunteer Corps.

== Life ==
Sheridan was the son of Garrett Sheridan of Cavan, Ireland and his wife Jane Juliana Darnley, daughter of Sir Richard Perrot, Bart. He was born in London in 1820 and was educated at Brighton. He entered the Inner Temple on 18 February 1852 and was called to the bar at the Inner Temple in 1856. He was a captain of the 6th Cinque Port Artillery Volunteer Corps and a J.P. for Middlesex, Westminster, Kent, and the Liberties of the Cinque Ports.

Sheridan wrote a poem entitled St. Lawrence's Well which was published in 1845.

Sheridan married Elizabeth Frances Wood, eldest surviving daughter of the Rev. John Wood on 10 December 1850. The marriage took place at Walworth. Sheridan was stated to be living at Brompton at this time.

In 1855, Sheridan moved into Belfield House in Fulham, residing there until 1863.

Sheridan was elected as the Member of Parliament (MP) for Dudley in 1857 after the sitting MP, Stafford Northcote, decided not to contest the general election of that year. Northcote had fallen out politically with Lord Ward, the owner of Dudley Castle and influential local landowner. Sheridan was unopposed at the election as both Radical and Tory factions in the town combined to support him in order to lessen the local political influence of Lord Ward. He subsequently won contested elections in 1859 and 1865. In 1868 he was elected unopposed. At the general election in February 1874, Sheridan won but the election was declared void on 28 April 1874 on the grounds that rioting took place at the poll. At the subsequent by-election held on 21 May 1874, he was again returned, defeating the ironmaster, Noah Hingley. He won the seat again in 1880 and 1885. He finally lost the seat in 1886, beaten at the election by Brooke Robinson.

Around the time that his parliamentary career was coming to an end, it was reported that he had expended the sum of £24,000 in order to "consolidate the Liberal interests of the town".

Sheridan was elected as a Fellow of the Royal Geographical Society of London in June 1860. He was on the council of the Kent Archaeological Society. He owned property at Litton Cheney in Dorset.

In the 1860s, Sheridan became involved in lending money to the government of Mexico, becoming chairman of the Mexican Bondholders' Committee.

In 1861, he was made a First Lieutenant of the 6th Cinque Ports Artillery Volunteers.

In 1869, Sheridan was listed as being part of the Chapter of the Venerable English Langue of the Sovereign and Illustrious Order Of St John Of Jerusalem.

In 1880, he was listed as living at 6 Colville Gardens, Kensington.

Henry Brinsley Sheridan died on 19 April 1906 aged 86.

== Parliamentary election results ==
General election 1857: Dudley
Party	Candidate	Votes	%	±%
Independent	Henry Brinsley Sheridan	unopposed		
Majority				
Turnout				
Independent gain from Conservative		Swing		

General election 1859: Dudley
Party	Candidate	Votes	%	±%
Liberal	Henry Brinsley Sheridan	432		
Conservative	Viscount Monck	361		
Majority		71		
Turnout				
Liberal gain from Independent		Swing		

General election 1865: Dudley
Party	Candidate	Votes	%	±%
Liberal	Henry Brinsley Sheridan	526		
Conservative	Francis Truscott	275		
Majority		251		
Turnout				
Liberal hold		Swing		

General election 1868: Dudley
Party	Candidate	Votes	%	±%
Liberal	Henry Brinsley Sheridan	unopposed		
Majority				
Turnout				
Liberal hold		Swing		

General election 1874: Dudley
Party	Candidate	Votes	%	±%
Liberal	Henry Brinsley Sheridan	5149		
Conservative	Fred Smith Shenstone	4181		
Majority		968		
Turnout				
Liberal hold		Swing		

1874 Dudley by-election: Dudley
Party	Candidate	Votes	%	±%
Liberal	Henry Brinsley Sheridan	5607		
Conservative	Noah Hingley	4889		
Majority		718		
Turnout				
Liberal hold		Swing		

General election 1880: Dudley
Party	Candidate	Votes	%	±%
Liberal	Henry Brinsley Sheridan	6948		
Conservative	Alfred Waterman	4163		
Majority		2785		
Turnout				
Liberal hold		Swing		

General election 1885: Dudley
Party	Candidate	Votes	%	±%
Liberal	Henry Brinsley Sheridan	6,377	55.0	
Conservative	Brooke Robinson	5,211	45.0	
Majority		1,166	10.0	
Turnout			77.7	
Liberal hold		Swing		

General election 1886: Dudley
Party	Candidate	Votes	%	±%
Conservative	Brooke Robinson	6,475	58.8	+13.8
Liberal	Henry Brinsley Sheridan	4,545	41.2	−13.8
Majority		1,930	17.6	27.6
Turnout			73.9	−3.8
Conservative gain from Liberal		Swing	+13.8	

Parliament of the United Kingdom
Preceded by Stafford Northcote	Member of Parliament for Dudley; 1857 – 1886	Succeeded by Brooke Robinson
