= John Wardlaw-Milne =

The Right Honorable Sir John Wardlaw-Milne KBE
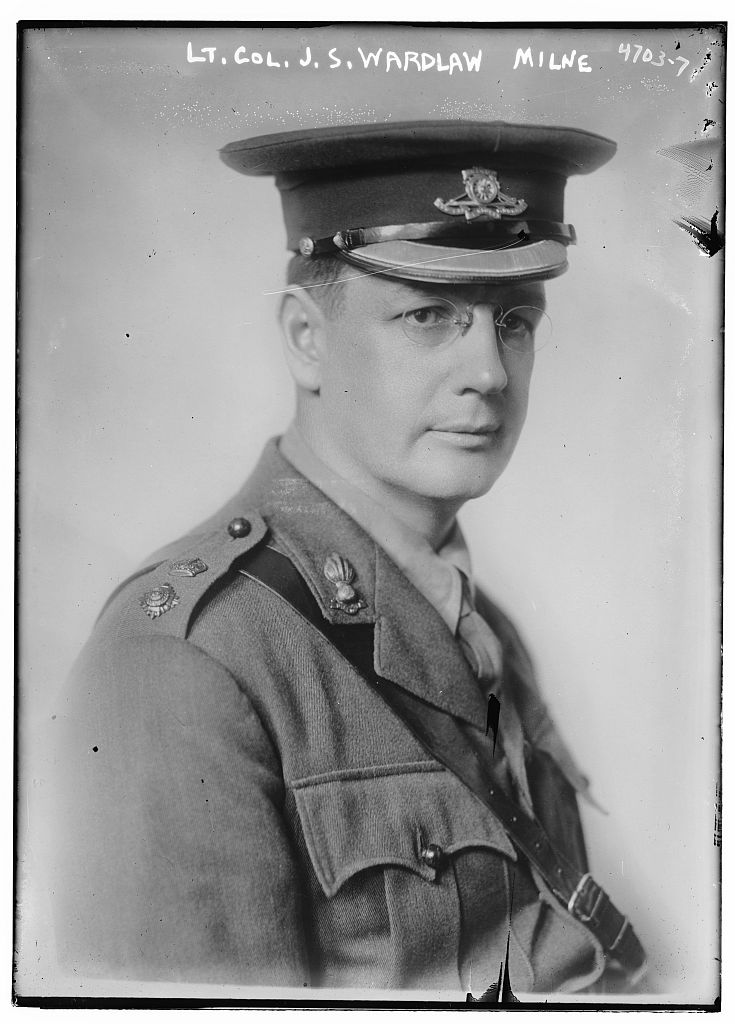
- Sir John Sydney Wardlaw-Milne in 1918

Member of Parliament for Kidderminster
- In office 15 November 1922 – 26 July 1945
- Preceded by: Eric Knight
- Succeeded by: Louis Tolley

Personal details
- Born: 7 May 1879 Elgin, Morayshire, Scotland
- Died: 11 July 1967 (aged 88) Grouville, Jersey
- Party: Conservative
- Spouse: Aimée Margaret Garden (m. 1907–1933: her death)
- Profession: Banker

Military service
- Branch/service: British Indian Army
- Years of service: 1917–1919
- Rank: Lieutenant colonel
- Unit: 4th (Bombay) Garrison Artillery
- Battles/wars: First World War; India in World War I
- Awards: Knight Commander of the Order of the British Empire (1932)
- Cricket career

Cricket information
- Batting: Left-handed
- Bowling: Left-arm (unknown style)

Domestic team information
- Years: Team
- 1902/03: Bombay
- 1907/08–1911/12: Europeans

Career statistics
Competition	First-class
Matches	7
Runs scored	122
Batting average	15.25
100s/50s	–/–
Top score	36
Balls bowled	771
Wickets	28
Bowling average	13.28
5 wickets in innings	2
10 wickets in match	–
Best bowling	5/21
Catches/stumpings	6/–
- Source: John Wardlaw-Milne at Cricinfo

Sir John Sydney Wardlaw-Milne KBE (7 May 1879 – 11 July 1967) was a Scottish Conservative Party politician and a first-class cricketer. The son of a Scottish banker, Wardlaw-Milne spent the early part of his life in British India, where he became a prominent figure in Bombay civic society. It was in India that he played first-class cricket for Bombay and the Europeans cricket team. Following the First World War, he returned to the United Kingdom and was elected the Conservative Member of Parliament (MP) for Kidderminster in 1922, an office he would hold until his defeat in the 1945 general election. As an MP, he was a member of the Imperial Economic Committee and during the Second World War was a critic of Prime Minister Winston Churchill, notably attempting to intitate a vote of no confidence against him in June and July 1942.

== Biography ==
=== Early life and time in India ===
The son of the banker James Milne and his wife, Elizabeth Wardlaw, he was born at Elgin in May 1879. He was educated in Scotland at the Larchfield Academy. After completing his education, he went to British India, where he was employed in commerce in Bombay. Milne played first-class cricket in India, making his debut for Bombay against the touring Oxford University Authentics at Bombay in November 1902. Five years later, he appeared in first-class cricket for the Europeans cricket team against the Parsees in the 1907–08 Bombay Triangular Tournament; he played first-class cricket for the Europeans until September 1911, making six appearances. Playing primarily as a left-arm bowler, he took 28 wickets at an average of 13.28; he took two five wicket hauls, with best figures of 5 for 21. With the bat, he scored 122 runs, with a highest score of 36.

Milne became a director at the shipping agents Turner Morrison in 1907, which led him gaining prominence on the Bombay Chamber of Commerce. In-turn, he was nominated to the Bombay Municipal Corporation, the board of trustees for the Port of Bombay, the City of Bombay Improvement Trust, and to the Bombay Presidency legislature. During the First World War, he served on the Viceroy of India's council in 1915, and as president of the government of India's advisory war shipping committee. Milne saw active service later in the war, being commissioned as a lieutenant colonel into the 4th (Bombay) Garrison Artillery. After the war, he was sent to Britain in 1919 in order to comment on the Government of India Act, which was passing through the Parliament of the United Kingdom. Thereafter, he toured the United States, where he lectured on matters pertaining to British foreign policy in the East.

=== Political career ===
Returning to the United Kingdom on a permanent basis, he began a career as a banker in the City of London; despite his relocation, he remained on the boards of both the Bank of Bombay and the Bombay, Baroda and Central India Railway. He was elected at the 1922 general election as Member of Parliament (MP) for Kidderminster, with him being re-elected in the 1923 and 1924 United Kingdom general elections. Following his election, he preferred to hyphenate his surname to Wardlaw-Milne. He held the seat until his defeat at the 1945 general election, where his Labour opponent Louis Tolley overcame a 25% deficit. Wardlaw-Milne was often seen as being on the right wing of the Conservative Party and during the tough economic times of the early 1930s, promoting the need to reduce taxes on businesses and reduce state intervention. He also promoted the raising of the school age and that free education should be abolished in elementary schools, proffering the introduction of a universal fee-paying system. He wrote two books on economic matters, which were published in 1931 and 1932.

Wardlaw-Milne was a proponent for greater immigration and expanding imperial markets as remedies for unemployment; his interest in these matters saw him serve as a member of the Imperial Economic Committee from 1927 to 1929. He was honoured in the 1932 Birthday Honours for his political and public services, being made a Knight Commander of the Civil Division of the Most Excellent Order of the British Empire. His prior experience in India served him well in parliament, with Wardlaw-Milne sitting on the Conservative Indian affairs committee from 1930 to 1935. He additionally sat on the Joint Select Committee on Indian constitutional reform from 1933 to 1935, which had been established to consider the proposals for Indian self-government contained in the government's March 1933 white paper, which ultimately led to the Government of India Act 1935. Throughout the 1930s, he was a supporter of Neville Chamberlain.

Wardlaw-Milne was a supporter of the Munich Agreement, however eleven months later he would support the declaration of war on Germany. During the war years, he was the chair of the Conservative foreign affairs committee, where his focus again remained in the east, specifically on trade with China. In September 1939, he became chair of the newly formed Select Committee on National Expenditure, where he became a vocal critic of administrative incompetence and attacked the government for failing to introduce industrial conscription to aid with the war effort, asserting that war output did not exceed 75% efficiency.

=== Vote of no confidence ===
During June–July 1942, Wardlaw-Milne was involved in an attempt to force Winston Churchill out in a vote of no confidence. The vote followed what Churchill in his war memoirs called "a long succession of misfortunes and defeats". The Conservative politician Robert Boothby, appearing in Martin Gilbert's documentary on Churchill's life, said, "It was the only time in the whole of the war that I saw him [Churchill] looking really anxious, because the only thing in the world he feared was Parliament." Wardlaw-Milne proposed the vote of no confidence on Churchill's running of the war. His speech, according to biographer Roy Jenkins, was "a fiasco." According to Jenkins, Wardlaw-Milne felt that operation of the war should be turned over to:

"a dominating figure to run the war and also a generalissimo to command all the armed forces. It was not clear whether Milne wanted them to be the same person.... However, it did not greatly matter for he turned his whole argument into bathos by nominating the Duke of Gloucester, the third son of George V, for either or both of these jobs."

Gloucester was regarded as "a figure of fun" and "[t]he idea that he could be turned into a dominating warrior prince scuppered both his own and Wardlaw-Milne's reputations". Churchill's own assessment was that "the combination of a Supreme War Commander with almost unlimited powers and his association with a Royal Duke seemed to have some flavour of dictatorship about it". The final vote on the proposal, on 1 July 1942, was 475 to 25 in favor of Churchill's government. Jenkins gives the vote as 477 to 27, including tellers.

=== Later life and death ===
Following his defeat in the 1945 general election, Wardlaw-Milne sat on the board of Cable & Wireless until 1953, having been appointed in 1943. He played an important role in the renovation of the Royal Albert Hall in his capacity as president of its corporation from 1949 to 1952. In his latter years, he moved firstly to Rhu in Dunbartonshire, before relocating to Grouville in Jersey in 1952. He died there at his residence on 11 July 1967. Having been widowed in 1933, and having no children who could inherit his estate, he left £100,000 to the Government of Jersey to construct a leisure centre at Fort Regent in St Helier. He was buried at sea, after requesting his body be disposed in such a manner.

== Footnotes ==
Parliament of the United Kingdom
Preceded by Eric Knight	Member of Parliament for Kidderminster; 1922–1945	Succeeded by Louis Tolley
