= Esmond Bulmer =

British Conservative Party politician

James Esmond Bulmer (born 19 May 1935) is a retired British Conservative Party politician. He is the son of Edward Charles Bulmer (b. 1907) and his wife Margaret Leigh (Roberts) Bulmer (b. 1908). His father, a Royal Air Force flight lieutenant, was killed in 1941 whilst on active service.

Bulmer was educated at Rugby School and King's College, Cambridge. He was commissioned in the Scots Guards during his national service. He then worked for the family firm, H. P. Bulmer Holdings Ltd, a cider maker. He was Member of Parliament for Kidderminster from February 1974 until the 1983 general election, and for Wyre Forest from 1983 until he stood down at the 1987 general election.

Parliament of the United Kingdom
Preceded by Sir Tatton Brinton	Member of Parliament for Kidderminster; February 1974–1983	Constituency abolished
New constituency	Member of Parliament for Wyre Forest; 1983–1987	Succeeded by Anthony Coombs
