= Augustus Godson =

British politician

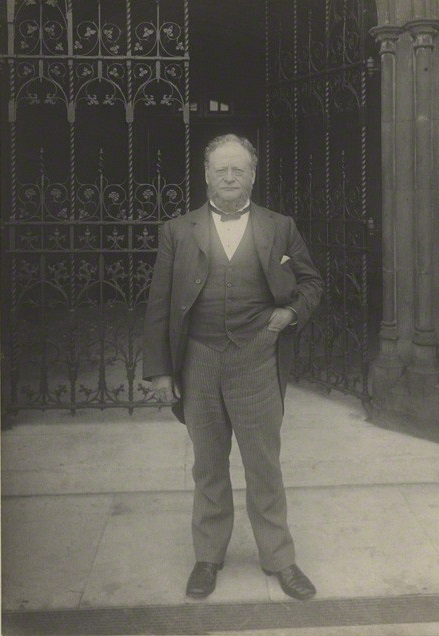
Augustus Godson

Sir Augustus Frederick Godson JP DL (1835 – 11 October 1906) was a British Conservative Party politician.

He was educated at King's College London and Queen's College, Oxford, and served as Member of Parliament for Kidderminster from 1886 to 1906. He was knighted in 1898.

Parliament of the United Kingdom
Preceded by John Brinton	Member of Parliament for Kidderminster; 1886–1906	Succeeded by Edmund Broughton Barnard
