= Edmund Broughton Barnard =

British politician, landowner and sportsman

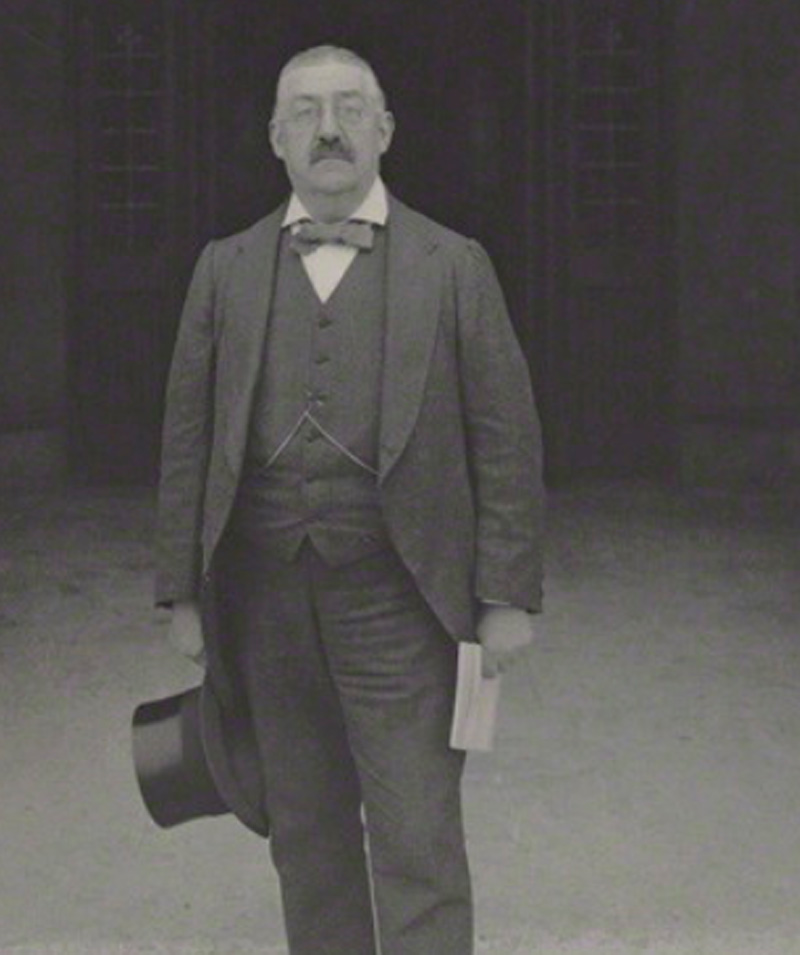
Edmund Broughton Barnard MP photographed by Benjamin Stone in 1909

Sir Edmund Broughton Barnard OBE JP DL (16 February 1856 – 27 January 1930) was a British Liberal politician, landowner and sportsman.

== Family and education ==
Barnard was the son of William Barnard, a wealthy maltster who had connections to Harlow Mill in Essex and the nearby Sawbridgeworth in Hertfordshire. He was educated at Brighton College and Downing College, Cambridge, where he gained his BA in 1879 and MA in 1882. He was a member of the Agricultural Board of Studies of Cambridge University. He married Alice Maude Richardson in 1887; she died in 1907.

He bought Grove Lodge in High Wych, near Sawbridgeworth from an uncle in 1892. In about 1903 he moved to Fair Green House in Sawbridgeworth which was his childhood home.

== Career ==
Barnard was an old-fashioned country gentleman, a patron of his locality on the Essex and Hertfordshire borders where his family had been extensive landowners and farmers for generations. He was a generous local benefactor and supporter of good causes.

== Local politics ==
Barnard was an original member of Hertfordshire County Council from 1888, serving on and chairing many different committees and becoming its chairman in 1920 and an Alderman. He was chairman of the County Council's Education Committee and took a strong stand in favour of the retention of village schools, emphasising their importance to the preservation of village life. Barnard also served on Sawbridgeworth Urban District Council and was its chairman between 1905 and 1907.

== Parliamentary politics ==
He stood unsuccessfully for Parliament three times before getting elected. At the 1885 general election he was Liberal candidate in Epping; in 1886 he stood in Maldon and then in Kidderminster at the general election of 1900. After nursing the constituency for the next few years, he was finally elected at Kidderminster in the Liberal landslide victory of 1906 where his Conservative opponent was the future prime minister Stanley Baldwin. He was a supporter of giving the vote to women. He did not contest Kidderminster in the general election of January 1910 but stood in Hertford.

General election January 1910: Hertford
Party	Candidate	Votes	%	±%
Conservative	John Rolleston	6,147	58.0	+7.6
Liberal	Edmund Broughton Barnard	4,455	42.0	−7.6
Majority		1,692	16.0	+15.2
Turnout		10,602	89.6	+3.4
Registered electors		11,838		
Conservative hold		Swing	+7.6	

He again fought Kidderminster in the December 1910 general election and came close to winning back his old seat.

He seemed to have had a falling out with the Liberals over the prosecution of the First World War and the conduct of party politics in general as he fought a 1917 by-election at Islington East for the National Party. He fought the 1918 general election for the same party at Hertford. In 1924 he supported the Conservative candidature of Winston Churchill at Epping.

== Other public appointments ==
In 1904 Barnard was elected Chairman of the Metropolitan Water Board. He was sometime Chairman of the Lee Conservancy Board and the Thames Conservancy Board. In connection with this work he was appointed the first employers' chairman of the Joint Industrial Council for the Waterworks Undertakings Industry. He was sometime president of the Canal Association of Great Britain. He was a Justice of the Peace for both Essex and Hertfordshire and Chairman of Bishops Stortford Petty Sessions. Barnard was also sometime chairman of the Hertfordshire Agricultural Executive, chairman of the Board of Governors of The Bishops Stortford Secondary School for Girls. On 17 April 1913, he was appointed a deputy lieutenant of Hertfordshire.

== Honours ==
He was awarded the OBE in 1920 and was knighted "For valuable services to local government" in February 1928.

== Sportsman ==
Barnard was an accomplished horseman. He played polo for Cambridge and rode in competitions under Jockey Club Rules, on one occasion riding three winners in an afternoon at Lewes races. He later took to regular attendance at race meetings and combined this with a reputation for being a pleasure seeker and convivial host at his Sawbridgeworth home.

== Death ==
Barnard died suddenly, aged 73, during a meeting of the Hertfordshire County Council which he was chairing on 27 January 1930. The meeting was being held in London in the Law Society's Hall. Apparently Barnard was just about to move a resolution when he experienced a sudden seizure. The county medical officer went to his assistance but he had died almost instantly.

Parliament of the United Kingdom
Preceded by Sir Augustus Godson	Member of Parliament for Kidderminster; 1906 – January 1910	Succeeded by Eric Ayshford Knight
Civic offices
Preceded by Melvill Beachcroft	Chairman of the Metropolitan Water Board; 1908–1920	Succeeded by John Karslake
