= Louis Tolley =

British politician (1889–1959)

Louis Byron Tolley (1889 – 30 April 1959) was a British Labour Party politician who was the Member of Parliament (MP) for Kidderminster from 1945 to 1950. He was the first and only Labour MP for the constituency of Kidderminster.

== Biography ==
Tolley was born in Kidderminster and worked as an engineer.

Tolley was first elected to Kidderminster Town Council in 1919. In 1923 he was president of the town's Trades and Labour Council, and was the Labour Party's parliamentary candidate at the general election. He was twice mayor of the borough during the Second World War.

At the 1945 general election, he was elected as Member of Parliament for Kidderminster. However, at the next general election in 1950, he lost the seat to the Conservative Party candidate Gerald Nabarro. He rejoined the borough council as an alderman, and was mayor for the third time in 1957. He was made an honorary freeman of the borough in 1958.

Parliament of the United Kingdom
Preceded by Sir John Wardlaw-Milne	Member of Parliament for Kidderminster; 1945–1950	Succeeded by Gerald Nabarro
