= Tatton Brinton =

British politician

Sir Esme Tatton Cecil Brinton (4 January 1916 – 26 September 1985) was a British Conservative Party politician.

Brinton was educated at Eton College and Gonville and Caius College, Cambridge, where he studied French and German, afterwards spending time abroad in Vienna and Paris. During the Second World War he served in the 12th Royal Lancers in France, Italy and North Africa, rising to the rank of Major, before being delegated to Technical Intelligence in Germany. Upon returning from the war, he contested Dudley unsuccessfully on behalf of the Conservatives at the 1945 general election.

Brinton was mayor of Kidderminster from 1953 to 1954 and chairman of the Kidderminster Conservative Association from 1955 to 1956 and again from 1958 to 1961. At the 1964 general election, he was elected as Member of Parliament for Kidderminster. He was re-elected twice, before stepping down at the February 1974 general election, when he was succeeded by the Conservative candidate Esmond Bulmer. During his time in Parliament, Brinton was joint treasurer of the Conservative Party, and was one of the minority on the Houghton Committee who successfully prevented the introduction of state financing of political parties.

Outside of politics, Brinton was the managing director and chairman of the family firm Brintons, a carpet manufacturer based in Kidderminster. He was chairman of the British Carpets Promotion Council from 1960 to 1966 and, following his retirement from Parliament, president of the Federation of British Carpet Manufacturers from 1974 to 1976. He remained president of Brintons until his death in 1985.

Parliament of the United Kingdom
Preceded by Gerald Nabarro	Member of Parliament for Kidderminster; 1964–February 1974	Succeeded by Esmond Bulmer
