= Kidderminster (constituency) =

Parliamentary constituency in the United Kingdom, 1832–1983

- Former county constituency for the House of Commons
- Kidderminster in Worcestershire, showing boundaries used from 1974–1983
- County: Worcestershire
- Major settlements: Kidderminster

1918–1983
- Seats: One
- Replaced by: Wyre Forest and Leominster

1832–1918
- Seats: One
- Type of constituency: Borough constituency
- Created from: Worcestershire

Kidderminster was a parliamentary constituency in Worcestershire, represented in the House of Commons of the Parliament of the United Kingdom. It elected one Member of Parliament (MP) by the first past the post voting system.

== History ==
The borough of Kidderminster returned two members to Parliament in 1295, Walter Caldrigan and William Lihtfot, but not to any subsequent one. From 1295 to 1832 Kidderminster had no separate representation from Worcestershire.

The constituency was created by the Reform Act 1832 for the 1832 general election and was abolished for the 1983 general election, when it was largely replaced by the new Wyre Forest constituency.

== Boundaries ==
=== 1832–1868 ===
The Reform Act 1832 enfranchised Kidderminster as a parliamentary borough. The constituency comprised the township of Kidderminster Borough and part of the township of Kidderminster Foreign. The Parliamentary Boundaries Act of the same year set out the boundaries in detail:

From the Point at or near Proud Cross at which the Boundary of the old Borough meets the Broomfield Road, along the Boundary of the old Borough, to the Point at which the Abberley Road meets the Black Brook; thence, Westward, along the Abberley Road to the first Point at which the same is met by a Hedge running due South therefrom; thence along the said Hedge to its Southern Extremity near a Stone Quarry; thence in a straight Line to the said Stone Quarry; thence in a straight Line to the First Mile Stone on the Bewdley Road; thence, Westward, along the Bewdley Road to the Point at which the same is joined by a Footpath leading to the Stourport Road; thence along the said Footpath to the Point at which the same meets the Boundary of the old Borough; thence, Southward, along the Boundary of the old Borough to the Point at which the same meets the South-eastern Fence of a Wood called "The Copse," situated on the Eastern Bank of the River Stour; thence along the said Fence to the Point at which the same meets Hoo Lane; thence across Hoo Lane, over a Stile called "Gallows Stile," along a Footpath leading from the said Stile to the Lane from Hoo Brook to Comberton Hill, to the Point at which the last-mentioned Footpath meets the Lane from Hoo-Brook to Comberton Hill; thence, Northward, along the Lane from Hoo-Brook to Comberton Hill to the Point at which the same meets the Boundary of the old Borough; thence, Northward, along the Boundary of the old Borough to the Point first described.

=== 1868–1918 ===
The Representation of the People Act 1867 (also known as the Second Reform Act) redrew parliamentary constituencies. The consequential Boundary Act of the following year extended the boundaries of the parliamentary borough. Three areas of the parish of Kidderminster and part of the parish of Wolverley were added.

=== 1918–1950 ===
The next change in constituency boundaries was carried out under the Representation of the People Act 1918. The parliamentary borough was abolished and a new Kidderminster constituency was created as a division of the parliamentary county of Worcestershire. It consisted of a wide area of northern Worcestershire, comprising the following local government districts:

- The municipal borough of Kidderminster
- Bromsgrove Urban District
- North Bromsgrove Urban District
- Redditch Urban District
- Bromsgrove Rural District
- Kidderminster Rural District

=== 1950–1983 ===
The Representation of the People Act 1948 redrew constituencies throughout Great Britain and Northern Ireland: the revised boundaries were first used at the 1950 general election. The 1948 legislation also introduced the terms "borough constituency" and "county constituency". The Bromsgrove and Redditch areas were formed into a separate Bromsgrove constituency, while the new Kidderminster County Constituency, now took much of north west Worcestershire. It was defined as follows:

- The boroughs of Bewdley and Kidderminster
- The urban district of Stourport on Severn
- The rural districts of Kidderminster, Martley and Tenbury

The boundaries were not altered at the next redistribution in 1970 and the seat remained unchanged until the 1983 general election, when constituencies were realigned to the administrative geography introduced in 1974. A new seat of Wyre Forest was formed centred on Kidderminster.

== Members of Parliament ==
| Year | 1st Member | 2nd member |
|---|---|---|
| 1295 | Walter Caldrigan | William Lihtfot |

| Year | Member | Party |
|---|---|---|
| 1832 | Richard Godson | Whig |
| 1835 | George Philips | Whig |
| 1837 | Richard Godson | Conservative |
| 1847 | Richard Godson | Peelite |
| 1849 | John Best | Conservative |
| 1852 | Robert Lowe | Whig |
| 1859 | Alfred Rhodes Bristow | Liberal |
| 1862 | Luke White | Liberal |
| 1865 | Albert Grant^{[note A]} | Conservative |
| 1868 | Thomas Lea | Liberal |
| 1874 | Albert Grant^{[note A]} | Conservative |
| 1874 | Sir William Fraser | Conservative |
| 1880 | John Brinton | Liberal |
| 1886 | Sir Augustus Godson | Conservative |
| 1906 | Edmund Broughton Barnard | Liberal |
| 1910 | Eric Knight | Conservative |
| 1922 | Sir John Wardlaw-Milne | Unionist |
| 1945 | Louis Tolley | Labour |
| 1950 | Sir Gerald Nabarro | Conservative |
| 1964 | Sir Tatton Brinton | Conservative |
| 1974 | Esmond Bulmer | Conservative |
| 1983 | constituency abolished | |

Note A: Grant was granted the title of baron in the Italian nobility by Victor Emmanuel II in 1868, and styled himself "Baron Albert Grant" thereafter. His election in 1874 was overturned on petition.

== Elections ==
=== Elections in the 1830s ===
General election 1832: Kidderminster
| Party | Candidate | Votes | % |
|---|---|---|---|
| Whig | Richard Godson | 172 | 52.0 |
| Whig | George Philips | 159 | 48.0 |
| Majority | | 13 | 4.0 |
| Turnout | | 331 | 84.9 |
| Registered electors | | 390 | |
| Whig win (new seat) | | | |

General election 1835: Kidderminster
| Party | Candidate | Votes | % | ±% |
|---|---|---|---|---|
| Whig | George Philips | 197 | 61.4 | +13.4 |
| Conservative | Richard Godson | 124 | 38.6 | −13.4 |
| Majority | | 73 | 22.8 | +18.8 |
| Turnout | | 321 | 83.8 | −1.1 |
| Registered electors | | 383 | | |
| Whig hold | | Swing | +13.4 | |

General election 1837: Kidderminster
| Party | Candidate | Votes | % | ±% |
|---|---|---|---|---|
| Conservative | Richard Godson | 198 | 55.8 | +17.2 |
| Whig | John Bagshaw | 157 | 44.2 | −17.2 |
| Majority | | 41 | 11.6 | N/A |
| Turnout | | 355 | 80.7 | −3.1 |
| Registered electors | | 440 | | |
| Conservative gain from Whig | | Swing | +17.2 | |

=== Elections in the 1840s ===
General election 1841: Kidderminster
| Party | Candidate | Votes | % | ±% |
|---|---|---|---|---|
| Conservative | Richard Godson | 212 | 51.5 | −4.3 |
| Whig | Samson Ricardo | 200 | 48.5 | +4.3 |
| Majority | | 12 | 3.0 | −8.6 |
| Turnout | | 412 | 85.5 | +4.8 |
| Registered electors | | 482 | | |
| Conservative hold | | Swing | −4.3 | |

General election 1847: Kidderminster
| Party | Candidate | Votes | % | ±% |
|---|---|---|---|---|
| Peelite | Richard Godson | Unopposed | | |
| Registered electors | | 548 | | |
| Peelite gain from Conservative | | | | |

Godson's death caused a by-election.

By-election, 5 September 1849: Kidderminster
| Party | Candidate | Votes | % | ±% |
|---|---|---|---|---|
| Conservative | John Best | 217 | 52.0 | N/A |
| Whig | Thomas Gisborne | 200 | 48.0 | N/A |
| Majority | | 17 | 4.0 | N/A |
| Turnout | | 417 | 84.4 | N/A |
| Registered electors | | 494 | | |
| Conservative gain from Peelite | | Swing | N/A | |

=== Elections in the 1850s ===
General election 1852: Kidderminster
| Party | Candidate | Votes | % | ±% |
|---|---|---|---|---|
| Whig | Robert Lowe | 246 | 61.8 | N/A |
| Conservative | John Best (politician, born 1821) | 152 | 38.2 | N/A |
| Majority | | 94 | 23.6 | N/A |
| Turnout | | 398 | 80.4 | N/A |
| Registered electors | | 495 | | |
| Whig gain from Peelite | | Swing | N/A | |

Lowe was appointed Vice-President of the Board of Trade, requiring a by-election.

By-election, 14 August 1855: Kidderminster
| Party | Candidate | Votes | % | ±% |
|---|---|---|---|---|
| Whig | Robert Lowe | Unopposed | | |
| Whig hold | | | | |

General election 1857: Kidderminster
| Party | Candidate | Votes | % | ±% |
|---|---|---|---|---|
| Whig | Robert Lowe | 234 | 61.6 | −0.2 |
| Conservative | William Boycott | 146 | 38.4 | +0.2 |
| Majority | | 88 | 23.2 | −0.4 |
| Turnout | | 380 | 75.7 | −4.7 |
| Registered electors | | 502 | | |
| Whig hold | | Swing | −0.2 | |

General election 1859: Kidderminster
| Party | Candidate | Votes | % | ±% |
|---|---|---|---|---|
| Liberal | Alfred Rhodes Bristow | 216 | 51.1 | −10.5 |
| Conservative | John Walter Huddleston | 207 | 48.9 | +10.5 |
| Majority | | 9 | 2.2 | −21.0 |
| Turnout | | 423 | 86.9 | +11.2 |
| Registered electors | | 487 | | |
| Liberal hold | | Swing | −10.5 | |

=== Elections in the 1860s ===
Bristow resigned, causing a by-election.

By-election, 27 May 1862: Kidderminster
| Party | Candidate | Votes | % | ±% |
|---|---|---|---|---|
| Liberal | Luke White | 229 | 51.1 | 0.0 |
| Conservative | John Gilbert Talbot | 219 | 48.9 | 0.0 |
| Majority | | 10 | 2.2 | 0.0 |
| Turnout | | 448 | 90.9 | +4.0 |
| Registered electors | | 493 | | |
| Liberal hold | | Swing | 0.0 | |

General election 1865: Kidderminster
| Party | Candidate | Votes | % | ±% |
|---|---|---|---|---|
| Conservative | Albert Grant | 285 | 51.4 | +2.5 |
| Liberal | Luke White | 270 | 48.6 | −2.5 |
| Majority | | 15 | 2.8 | N/A |
| Turnout | | 555 | 90.7 | +3.8 |
| Registered electors | | 612 | | |
| Conservative gain from Liberal | | Swing | +2.5 | |

General election 1868: Kidderminster
| Party | Candidate | Votes | % | ±% |
|---|---|---|---|---|
| Liberal | Thomas Lea | 1,262 | 61.1 | +12.5 |
| Conservative | William Makins | 802 | 38.9 | −12.5 |
| Majority | | 460 | 22.2 | N/A |
| Turnout | | 2,064 | 88.9 | −1.8 |
| Registered electors | | 2,323 | | |
| Liberal gain from Conservative | | Swing | +12.5 | |

=== Elections in the 1870s ===
General election 1874: Kidderminster
| Party | Candidate | Votes | % | ±% |
|---|---|---|---|---|
| Conservative | Albert Grant | 1,509 | 51.9 | +13.0 |
| Liberal | Thomas Lea | 1,398 | 48.1 | −13.0 |
| Majority | | 111 | 3.8 | N/A |
| Turnout | | 2,907 | 85.7 | −3.2 |
| Registered electors | | 3,394 | | |
| Conservative gain from Liberal | | Swing | +13.0 | |

The election was declared void on petition.

By-election, 1 Aug 1874: Kidderminster
| Party | Candidate | Votes | % | ±% |
|---|---|---|---|---|
| Conservative | William Fraser | 1,651 | 55.6 | +3.7 |
| Liberal | George Harris Lea | 1,318 | 44.4 | −3.7 |
| Majority | | 333 | 11.2 | +7.4 |
| Turnout | | 2,969 | 87.5 | +1.8 |
| Registered electors | | 3,394 | | |
| Conservative hold | | Swing | +3.7 | |

=== Elections in the 1880s ===
John Brinton

General election 1880: Kidderminster
| Party | Candidate | Votes | % | ±% |
|---|---|---|---|---|
| Liberal | John Brinton | 1,795 | 54.9 | +6.8 |
| Conservative | Albert Grant | 1,472 | 45.1 | −6.8 |
| Majority | | 323 | 9.8 | N/A |
| Turnout | | 3,267 | 90.6 | +4.9 |
| Registered electors | | 3,606 | | |
| Liberal gain from Conservative | | Swing | 6.8 | |

Immediately following the election, upon discovering his election agent had been reported for bribery at a previous election, Brinton resigned to seek re-election at a by-election.

By-election, 8 May 1880: Kidderminster
| Party | Candidate | Votes | % | ±% |
|---|---|---|---|---|
| Liberal | John Brinton | Unopposed | | |
| Liberal hold | | | | |

General election 1885: Kidderminster
| Party | Candidate | Votes | % | ±% |
|---|---|---|---|---|
| Liberal | John Brinton | 2,172 | 51.9 | −3.0 |
| Conservative | Augustus Godson | 2,014 | 48.1 | +3.0 |
| Majority | | 158 | 3.8 | −6.0 |
| Turnout | | 4,186 | 92.9 | +2.3 |
| Registered electors | | 4,506 | | |
| Liberal hold | | Swing | −3.0 | |

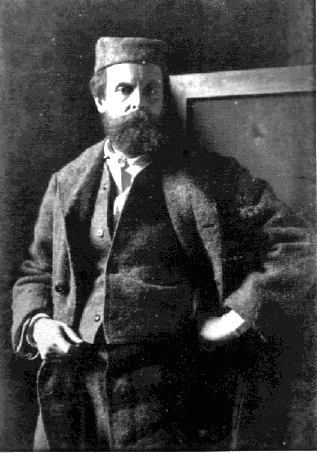
Wilfred Blunt

General election 1886: Kidderminster
| Party | Candidate | Votes | % | ±% |
|---|---|---|---|---|
| Conservative | Augustus Godson | 2,081 | 53.7 | +5.6 |
| Liberal | Wilfrid Blunt | 1,796 | 46.3 | −5.6 |
| Majority | | 285 | 7.4 | N/A |
| Turnout | | 3,877 | 86.0 | −6.9 |
| Registered electors | | 4,506 | | |
| Conservative gain from Liberal | | Swing | +5.6 | |

=== Elections in the 1890s ===
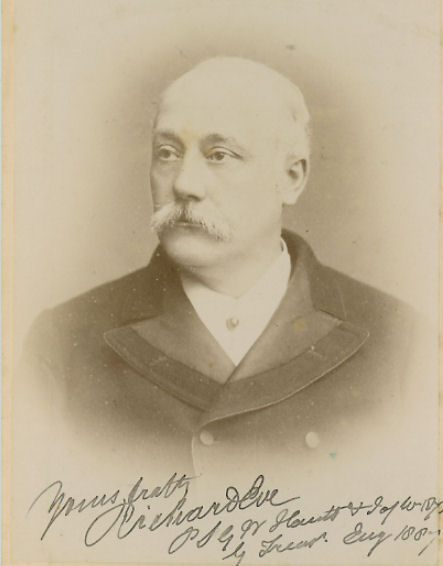
Richard Eve

General election 1892: Kidderminster
| Party | Candidate | Votes | % | ±% |
|---|---|---|---|---|
| Conservative | Augustus Godson | 2,066 | 53.4 | −0.3 |
| Liberal | Richard Eve | 1,801 | 46.6 | +0.3 |
| Majority | | 265 | 6.8 | −0.6 |
| Turnout | | 3,867 | 91.3 | +5.3 |
| Registered electors | | 4,236 | | |
| Conservative hold | | Swing | −0.3 | |

General election 1895: Kidderminster
| Party | Candidate | Votes | % | ±% |
|---|---|---|---|---|
| Conservative | Augustus Godson | 2,008 | 54.0 | +0.6 |
| Liberal | Richard Eve | 1,713 | 46.0 | −0.6 |
| Majority | | 295 | 8.0 | +1.2 |
| Turnout | | 3,721 | 88.7 | −2.6 |
| Registered electors | | 4,195 | | |
| Conservative hold | | Swing | +0.3 | |

=== Elections in the 1900s ===
General election 1900: Kidderminster
| Party | Candidate | Votes | % | ±% |
|---|---|---|---|---|
| Conservative | Augustus Godson | 1,950 | 51.9 | −2.1 |
| Liberal | Edmund Barnard | 1,804 | 48.1 | +2.1 |
| Majority | | 146 | 3.8 | −4.2 |
| Turnout | | 3,754 | 87.5 | −1.2 |
| Registered electors | | 4,289 | | |
| Conservative hold | | Swing | −2.1 | |

Edmund Barnard

General election 1906: Kidderminster
| Party | Candidate | Votes | % | ±% |
|---|---|---|---|---|
| Liberal | Edmund Barnard | 2,354 | 53.1 | +5.0 |
| Conservative | Stanley Baldwin | 2,083 | 46.9 | −5.0 |
| Majority | | 271 | 6.2 | N/A |
| Turnout | | 4,437 | 94.5 | +7.0 |
| Registered electors | | 4,697 | | |
| Liberal gain from Conservative | | Swing | +5.0 | |

=== Elections in the 1910s ===
General election January 1910: Kidderminster
| Party | Candidate | Votes | % | ±% |
|---|---|---|---|---|
| Conservative | Eric Knight | 2,353 | 54.3 | +7.4 |
| Liberal | Edward Fraser | 1,984 | 45.7 | −7.4 |
| Majority | | 369 | 8.6 | N/A |
| Turnout | | 4,337 | 94.7 | +0.2 |
| Registered electors | | 4,579 | | |
| Conservative gain from Liberal | | Swing | +7.4 | |

General election December 1910: Kidderminster
| Party | Candidate | Votes | % | ±% |
|---|---|---|---|---|
| Conservative | Eric Knight | 2,188 | 52.2 | −2.1 |
| Liberal | Edmund Barnard | 2,003 | 47.8 | +2.1 |
| Majority | | 185 | 4.4 | −4.2 |
| Turnout | | 4,191 | 91.5 | −3.2 |
| Registered electors | | 4,579 | | |
| Conservative hold | | Swing | −2.1 | |

General Election 1914–15:

Another General Election was required to take place before the end of 1915. The political parties had been making preparations for an election to take place and by July 1914, the following candidates had been selected;

- Unionist: Eric Knight

General election 1918: Kidderminster
| Party | | Candidate | Votes | % | ±% |
|---|---|---|---|---|---|
| C | Unionist | Eric Knight | 13,497 | 58.0 | +5.8 |
| | Labour | John Baker | 9,760 | 42.0 | New |
| Majority | | | 3,737 | 16.0 | +11.6 |
| Turnout | | | 23,257 | 58.4 | −33.1 |
| Registered electors | | | 39,798 | | |
| | Unionist hold | | Swing | | |
C indicates candidate endorsed by the coalition government.

=== Elections in the 1920s ===
General election 1922: Kidderminster
| Party | Candidate | Votes | % | ±% |
|---|---|---|---|---|
| Unionist | John Wardlaw-Milne | 19,711 | 68.2 | +10.2 |
| Labour | John Hutchinson Bruce | 9,203 | 31.8 | −10.2 |
| Majority | | 10,508 | 36.4 | +20.4 |
| Turnout | | 28,914 | 70.0 | +11.6 |
| Registered electors | | 41,286 | | |
| Unionist hold | | Swing | +10.2 | |

Henry Purchase

General election 1923: Kidderminster
| Party | Candidate | Votes | % | ±% |
|---|---|---|---|---|
| Unionist | John Wardlaw-Milne | 15,469 | 53.1 | −15.1 |
| Liberal | Henry Purchase | 9,663 | 33.2 | New |
| Labour | Louis Tolley | 3,990 | 13.7 | −18.1 |
| Majority | | 5,806 | 19.9 | −16.5 |
| Turnout | | 29,122 | 69.4 | −0.6 |
| Registered electors | | 41,939 | | |
| Unionist hold | | Swing | +1.5 | |

General election 1924: Kidderminster
| Party | Candidate | Votes | % | ±% |
|---|---|---|---|---|
| Unionist | John Wardlaw-Milne | 18,040 | 59.1 | +6.0 |
| Labour | J. Clifford Leigh | 6,792 | 22.3 | +8.6 |
| Liberal | Henry Purchase | 5,667 | 18.6 | −14.6 |
| Majority | | 11,248 | 36.8 | +16.9 |
| Turnout | | 30,499 | 71.3 | +1.9 |
| Registered electors | | 42,770 | | |
| Unionist hold | | Swing | −1.3 | |

General election 1929: Kidderminster
| Party | Candidate | Votes | % | ±% |
|---|---|---|---|---|
| Unionist | John Wardlaw-Milne | 21,643 | 48.1 | −11.0 |
| Labour | Frank G. Lloyd | 12,246 | 27.3 | +5.0 |
| Liberal | John William Hughes | 11,050 | 24.6 | +6.0 |
| Majority | | 9,397 | 20.8 | −16.0 |
| Turnout | | 44,939 | 75.6 | +4.3 |
| Registered electors | | 59,421 | | |
| Unionist hold | | Swing | −8.0 | |

=== Elections in the 1930s ===
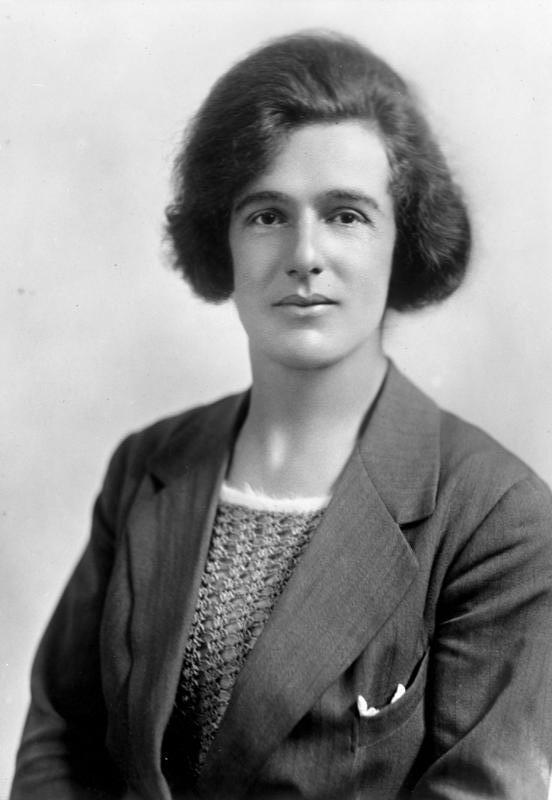
Jessie Stephen

General election 1931: Kidderminster
| Party | Candidate | Votes | % | ±% |
|---|---|---|---|---|
| Conservative | John Wardlaw-Milne | 33,359 | 77.3 | +29.2 |
| Labour | Jessie Stephen | 9,814 | 22.7 | −4.6 |
| Majority | | 23,545 | 54.6 | +33.8 |
| Turnout | | 43,173 | 69.0 | −6.6 |
| Conservative hold | | Swing | +16.8 | |

General election 1935: Kidderminster
| Party | Candidate | Votes | % | ±% |
|---|---|---|---|---|
| Conservative | John Wardlaw-Milne | 28,494 | 69.5 | −7.8 |
| Labour | Charles Coombes | 12,485 | 30.5 | +7.8 |
| Majority | | 16,009 | 39.0 | −15.6 |
| Turnout | | 40,979 | 60.2 | −8.8 |
| Conservative hold | | Swing | −7.8 | |

General Election 1939–40

Another General Election was required to take place before the end of 1940. The political parties had been making preparations for an election to take place and by the Autumn of 1939, the following candidates had been selected;

- Conservative: John Wardlaw-Milne

=== Elections in the 1940s ===
General election 1945: Kidderminster
| Party | Candidate | Votes | % | ±% |
|---|---|---|---|---|
| Labour | Louis Tolley | 34,421 | 55.8 | +25.3 |
| Conservative | John Wardlaw-Milne | 27,272 | 44.2 | −25.3 |
| Majority | | 7,149 | 11.6 | N/A |
| Turnout | | 61,693 | 70.7 | +10.5 |
| Labour gain from Conservative | | Swing | +25.3 | |

=== Elections in the 1950s ===
General election 1950: Kidderminster
| Party | Candidate | Votes | % | ±% |
|---|---|---|---|---|
| Conservative | Gerald Nabarro | 22,950 | 49.96 | +5.75 |
| Labour | Louis Tolley | 19,145 | 41.67 | −14.12 |
| Liberal | John Maurice Eccles | 3,844 | 8.37 | New |
| Majority | | 3,805 | 8.29 | N/A |
| Turnout | | 45,939 | 84.08 | +13.37 |
| Registered electors | | 56,640 | | |
| Conservative gain from Labour | | Swing | +9.94 | |

General election 1951: Kidderminster
| Party | Candidate | Votes | % | ±% |
|---|---|---|---|---|
| Conservative | Gerald Nabarro | 25,483 | 55.63 | +5.67 |
| Labour | IA Jack Williams | 20,325 | 44.37 | +2.70 |
| Majority | | 5,158 | 11.26 | +2.97 |
| Turnout | | 45,808 | 83.02 | −1.06 |
| Registered electors | | 55,179 | | |
| Conservative hold | | Swing | +1.49 | |

General election 1955: Kidderminster
| Party | Candidate | Votes | % | ±% |
|---|---|---|---|---|
| Conservative | Gerald Nabarro | 26,142 | 59.33 | +3.70 |
| Labour | IA Jack Williams | 17,918 | 40.67 | −3.70 |
| Majority | | 8,341 | 18.66 | +7.40 |
| Turnout | | 38,307 | 81.07 | −1.95 |
| Registered electors | | 47,254 | | |
| Conservative hold | | Swing | +3.70 | |

General election 1959: Kidderminster
| Party | Candidate | Votes | % | ±% |
|---|---|---|---|---|
| Conservative | Gerald Nabarro | 27,699 | 60.14 | +0.81 |
| Labour | Joan Tomlinson | 18,356 | 39.86 | −0.81 |
| Majority | | 9,343 | 20.28 | +1.62 |
| Turnout | | 46,055 | 79.10 | −1.97 |
| Registered electors | | 58,223 | | |
| Conservative hold | | Swing | +0.81 | |

=== Elections in the 1960s ===
General election 1964: Kidderminster
| Party | Candidate | Votes | % | ±% |
|---|---|---|---|---|
| Conservative | Tatton Brinton | 24,425 | 50.75 | −9.41 |
| Labour | George W Jones | 17,571 | 36.51 | −3.35 |
| Liberal | Lionel A King | 5,824 | 12.10 | New |
| British and Commonwealth Party | Miles S Blair | 310 | 0.64 | New |
| Majority | | 6,854 | 14.24 | −6.05 |
| Turnout | | 48,130 | 79.41 | +0.31 |
| Registered electors | | 60,606 | | |
| Conservative hold | | Swing | −3.03 | |

General election 1966: Kidderminster
| Party | Candidate | Votes | % | ±% |
|---|---|---|---|---|
| Conservative | Tatton Brinton | 24,628 | 51.99 | +1.24 |
| Labour | John W Wardle | 21,451 | 45.28 | +8.77 |
| Independent | Reginald Smith | 1,292 | 2.73 | New |
| Majority | | 3,177 | 6.71 | −7.53 |
| Turnout | | 47,371 | 75.57 | −3.84 |
| Registered electors | | 62,688 | | |
| Conservative hold | | Swing | −3.77 | |

=== Elections in the 1970s ===
General election 1970: Kidderminster
| Party | Candidate | Votes | % | ±% |
|---|---|---|---|---|
| Conservative | Tatton Brinton | 27,667 | 51.75 | |
| Labour | Graham F Smith | 18,297 | 34.22 | |
| Liberal | H Brian Lamb | 7,502 | 14.03 | |
| Majority | | 9,370 | 17.53 | |
| Turnout | | 53,466 | 73.84 | |
| Conservative hold | | Swing | | |

General election February 1974: Kidderminster
| Party | Candidate | Votes | % | ±% |
|---|---|---|---|---|
| Conservative | Esmond Bulmer | 27,065 | 42.50 | −9.25 |
| Labour | Reginald Jones | 18,380 | 28.87 | −5.35 |
| Liberal | Anthony Batchelor | 18,230 | 28.63 | +14.60 |
| Majority | | 8,685 | 13.63 | −3.90 |
| Turnout | | 63,675 | 81.22 | +7.38 |
| Conservative hold | | Swing | | |

General election October 1974: Kidderminster
| Party | Candidate | Votes | % | ±% |
|---|---|---|---|---|
| Conservative | Esmond Bulmer | 25,602 | 43.27 | +0.77 |
| Labour | Reginald Jones | 18,833 | 31.83 | +2.96 |
| Liberal | Anthony Batchelor | 14,733 | 24.90 | −3.73 |
| Majority | | 6,769 | 11.44 | −2.20 |
| Turnout | | 59,168 | 74.95 | −6.27 |
| Conservative hold | | Swing | −1.10 | |

General election 1979: Kidderminster
| Party | Candidate | Votes | % | ±% |
|---|---|---|---|---|
| Conservative | Esmond Bulmer | 33,523 | 53.74 | +10.47 |
| Labour | Tony Wright | 17,871 | 28.65 | −3.18 |
| Liberal | Garrett Adams | 9,939 | 15.93 | −8.97 |
| National Front | Albert Luckman | 1,052 | 1.69 | New |
| Majority | | 15,652 | 25.09 | +13.65 |
| Turnout | | 62,385 | 77.56 | +2.61 |
| Conservative hold | | Swing | +6.82 | |

== Sources ==
- Craig, F. W. S. (1983) [1969]. British parliamentary election results 1918-1949 (3rd ed.). Chichester: Parliamentary Research Services. ISBN 0-900178-06-X.
- Leigh Rayment's Historical List of MPs – Constituencies beginning with "K" (part 1)
