= Gerald Nabarro =

British politician (1913–1973)

Sir Gerald Nabarro MP
- Nabarro in 1962

Member of Parliament for Kidderminster
- In office 23 February 1950 – 15 October 1964
- Preceded by: Louis Tolley
- Succeeded by: Tatton Brinton

Member of Parliament for South Worcestershire
- In office 31 March 1966 – 18 November 1973
- Preceded by: Peter Agnew
- Succeeded by: Michael Spicer

Personal details
- Born: Gerald David Nunes Nabarro; 29 June 1913 Willesden, England
- Died: 18 November 1973 (aged 60) Broadway, Worcestershire, England
- Party: Conservative
- Spouse: Joan Maud Violet im Thurn (m. 1943)
- Children: 4

Military service
- Allegiance: United Kingdom
- Branch/service: British Army
- Years of service: 1930–1946
- Unit: King's Royal Rifle Corps; Royal Artillery
- Battles/wars: Second World War

Sir Gerald David Nunes Nabarro (29 June 1913 – 18 November 1973) was a British businessman and Conservative Party politician who was an MP from 1950 until his death. Nabarro positioned himself on the right of the Conservative Party. Though he never left the backbenches, he was a comparatively high-profile political figure, owing in large part to his eccentric personal style.

== Early life ==
Nabarro was born in Willesden Green, Middlesex, the son of Solomon Nunes Nabarro, a retail tobacconist who went bankrupt in 1921, and his wife Lena (died 1921), née Drucquer. He was born to a prominent Sephardi Jewish family, but later converted to Christianity. Until age 14, he was educated at London County Council schools.

== Career ==
Nabarro left school at 14, and ran away from home into the Merchant Navy. He later enlisted in the British Army's King's Royal Rifle Corps in 1930, rising to the rank of staff sergeant instructor. After some self-education, he was accepted for commissioning as an officer, but believed he had insufficient private means and, having served his time, he was honourably discharged in 1937. He went into the timber-supply industry, where he made his fortune, able to later claim to have served in every grade from labourer to managing director.

He also served in the Territorial Army from 1937, and at the start of the Second World War, he was commissioned as an officer in the Royal Artillery. During the war, he was seconded for special industrial production processes in the United Kingdom. He left full-time military service in favour of industrial employment in 1943, but remained on the Reserve of Officers until 1946.

Nabarro served among many positions outside industry and parliament, including as: a Governor of the University of Birmingham and Convocation Member at Aston University; President of the Road Passenger and Transport Association 1951–55; the Merseyside area of the National Union of Manufacturers 1956–62; the London branch of the Institute of Marketing 1968–70; and the British Direct Mail Marketing Association 1968–72.

Nabarro was also interested in the revival of the Severn Valley Railway (which was partly in his former Kidderminster constituency), and his fascination with the SVR served as the basis of two of his books, Severn Valley Steam and Steam Nostalgia. In early 1972, he persuaded the SVR, of which he became chairman, to allow him to raise the money to buy the line from Hampton Loade to Foley Park by means of a share issue in a newly created public limited company, Severn Valley Railway (Holdings) Ltd—of which he was also the chairman. Nabarro's new company then "became responsible for the policy and financial decisions affecting the whole railway, and specifically for financing the purchase of the southern extension from Alveley to Foley Park." The share issue took place, but after SVR volunteers discovered he planned to sell the Bridgnorth railway station site for hotel and housing development and bring business friends from outside onto the board, it led to a threatened strike by the railway's volunteer staff, and his proposals were thrown out at a heated annual general meeting (AGM). Nabarro resigned from the board of directors in May 1973.

== Political career ==
At the 1945 general election, Nabarro stood as the Conservative candidate in the Labour-held West Bromwich constituency. The seat was comfortably held by Labour's John Dugdale, with a swing of 18.6%, much higher than the national average of 10%.

In the general election of 1950, Nabarro was elected as Member of Parliament (MP) for Kidderminster, Worcestershire, which he held until 1964. He then retired on health grounds.

Given a clean bill of health later, he was selected as Conservative candidate for the safer constituency of South Worcestershire, neighbouring his old constituency, after the previous MP, Sir Peter Agnew, had retired. He duly won the seat in the 1966 general election, and represented it until he died in office in November 1973. No by-election was held following his death; the seat was still vacant when Parliament was dissolved on 8 February 1974 for the general election later that month.

Through his career, he was the sponsor of various pieces of legislation, claiming credit for the Coroners Act 1954; the Clean Air Act 1956; Thermal Insulation (Industrial Buildings) Act 1957; Oil Burners (Standards) Act 1960; and the introduction of government health warnings on cigarette packets in 1971. He unsuccessfully proposed an amendment to the Life Peerages Bill in 1958 that would have allowed hereditary peers to renounce their peerages, and seek election to sit in the House of Commons. When Anthony Wedgwood Benn, a Labour MP, sought to do that when forced to vacate his seat at the death of his father, Viscount Stansgate, in 1960, Nabarro was his chief Conservative supporter in the Commons, and the two sponsored the Peerage Act 1963. Subsequently, the act enabled Wedgwood Benn to re-enter the Commons, and the Earl of Home to do the same when as Sir Alec Douglas-Home he became Prime Minister in the same year.

Nabarro was made a Knight Bachelor for political and public services in the 1963 New Year Honours list.

== Style ==
Nabarro characterised himself as an old-style Tory: he opposed the European Economic Community project, as well as drugs, pop music, and pornography, and was critical of students. He was a supporter of capital punishment, and backed Enoch Powell following the latter's "Rivers of Blood" speech. Even five years earlier, on 5 April 1963, while appearing on Any Questions?, Nabarro asked, "How would you feel if your daughter wanted to marry a big buck nigger with the prospect of coffee-coloured grandchildren?"—remarks which were excised from a repeat of the programme the following week.

Despite humble beginnings, Nabarro had the style of a conservative toff, sporting a Jimmy Edwards-style handlebar moustache, a booming baritone voice, and a Terry-Thomas accent. He enjoyed driving, and owned the personalised number plates NAB 1 to 8, which he attached to his large garage of cars, including three Daimlers. He considered that a Conservative candidate's car should be substantial, but not too substantial, and did not own Rolls-Royces or Bentleys.

== Personal life ==
On 1 June 1943, Nabarro married Joan Maud Violet im Thurn, the elder daughter of Colonel Bernhardt Basil von Brumsey im Thurn, DSO, of Winchester, a British Army officer of Austrian ancestry. They had two sons and two daughters. His wife survived him and died in 2009.

== Later years ==
On the night of 21 May 1971, Nabarro's car, a Daimler Sovereign bearing the number plate NAB 1, was seen to swerve at speed the wrong way round a roundabout at Totton, Hampshire. It was occupied by Nabarro and his company secretary, Margaret Mason. The police charged him as the driver, but Nabarro insisted it was his secretary, who agreed with his story. During the trial, Nabarro testified that he had spent the week leading up to the accident attending "a meeting of the women's advisory committee of the New Forest Conservatives at the Grand Hotel in Lyndhurst." Nabarro stated that he was exhausted from working long hours at the weeklong conference, and after seeing that her employer needed rest, Mrs. Mason had offered to drive the return journey. Despite Mrs. Mason's testimony that she had been driving while Nabarro slept, a witness positively identified Nabarro as the driver, and he was found guilty by a jury at Winchester Crown Court; the judge pronounced his behaviour "outrageous," and imposed the penalties of a £250 fine and disqualification from driving for two years. He announced his appeal on the court steps immediately afterwards, accompanied by his private secretary, Christine Holman. Nabarro suffered two strokes in the following year, and was cleared in the delayed second trial, after four new witnesses testified that they had seen a woman driving.

In 1999, The Guardian newspaper speculated that the jury had brought in their verdict to spare Nabarro the horrors of a perjury trial. In response, his son stated that the other occupant was employed as his driver and not as his secretary. He added that his father suffered from diabetes, and had hardly driven for some years before the dangerous driving allegation at his doctor's orders. A few months later, having recently announced a decision to retire from the Commons on grounds of health, he died at his home, Orchard Farmhouse, in Broadway, Worcestershire on 18 November 1973, aged 60. He had suffered a cerebral haemorrhage the previous week.

== Publications ==
(Sourced from Who's Who)

- Nab 1: Portrait of a Politician (Robert Maxwell, 1969) (memoir)
- Severn Valley Steam (Routledge, 1971)
- Steam Nostalgia: Locomotive and Railway Preservation in Great Britain (Routledge, 1972)
- Learners at Large (1973)
- Exploits of a Politician (Arthur Barker, 1973) (memoir)

== Notes ==
Parliament of the United Kingdom
Preceded by Louis Tolley	Member of Parliament for Kidderminster; 1950–1964	Succeeded by Tatton Brinton
Preceded by Peter Agnew	Member of Parliament for South Worcestershire; 1966–1973	Succeeded by Michael Spicer
