= Arthur George Hooper =

Arthur Hooper

Arthur George Hooper (30 January 1857 – 28 April 1940) was a British solicitor and Member of Parliament for Dudley for the Liberal Party (1906-1910).

== Background ==
Arthur George Hooper was born on 30 January 1857. He was the son of George Freeman Hooper and Sarah Pitt. He married Fanny Shillito of Birmingham who was daughter of the Reverend Joseph Shillito. He first was a partner in the firm of Dudley-based solicitors, Hooper & Fairbairn, then serving on Dudley Town Council. He played cricket for Dudley Cricket Club from 1888 to 1892. Hooper was a Congregationalist.

== Career ==
Hooper sat as Liberal MP for Dudley from 1906 to 1910. He first stood for parliament at the 1906 General Election when he gained Dudley from the Conservatives after the incumbent MP, Brooke Robinson, had decided not to stand for health reasons.

General election 1906 Dudley Electorate 17,564
Party	Candidate	Votes	%	±%
Liberal	Arthur George Hooper	8,296	52.4	+4.8
Conservative	G.H. Claughton	7,542	47.6	−4.8
Majority		754	4.8	9.6
Turnout			90.2	+12.4
Liberal gain from Conservative		Swing	+4.8	

Hooper gave his maiden speech in the House of Commons on 10 December 1906 on the issue of religious instructions in the debate on the abortive 1906 Education bill.

When he stood for re-election at the January 1910 General Election, he held his seat. However, at the December 1910 general election, he was defeated by the Conservatives despite a Liberal victory nationally.

General election January 1910: Dudley
Party	Candidate	Votes	%	±%
Liberal	Arthur George Hooper	8,342	50.6	−1.8
Conservative	Arthur Griffith-Boscawen	8,155	49.4	+1.8
Majority		187	1.2	−3.6
Turnout		16,497	94.4	+4.2
Liberal hold		Swing		

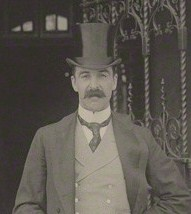
Griffith-Boscawen

General election December 1910: Dudley
Party	Candidate	Votes	%	±%
Conservative	Arthur Griffith-Boscawen	8,260	51.1	+1.7
Liberal	Arthur George Hooper	7,900	48.9	−1.7
Majority		360	2.2	N/A
Turnout		16,160	92.4	−2.0
Conservative gain from Liberal		Swing	+1.7	

== Sources ==
- British parliamentary election results 1885–1918, Craig, F. W. S.
- "Black Country History". Archived from the original on 13 February 2022.

Parliament of the United Kingdom
Preceded by Brooke Robinson	Member of Parliament for Dudley; 1906–Dec. 1910	Succeeded by Arthur Griffith-Boscawen
