= Michael Spicer, Baron Spicer =

British politician (1943–2019)

The Right Honourable The Lord Spicer PC

Chair of the 1922 Committee
- In office 20 June 2001 – 25 May 2010
- Leader: William Hague; Iain Duncan Smith; Michael Howard; David Cameron
- Preceded by: Archie Hamilton
- Succeeded by: Graham Brady

Member of the House of Lords
- Lord Temporal
- Life peerage 8 July 2010 – 29 May 2019

Member of Parliament for West Worcestershire South Worcestershire (1974–1997)
- In office 28 February 1974 – 12 April 2010
- Preceded by: Gerald Nabarro
- Succeeded by: Harriett Baldwin

Chair of the European Research Group
- In office 1994–2001
- Succeeded by: David Heathcoat-Amory

Personal details
- Born: William Michael Hardy Spicer; 22 January 1943 Bath, Somerset, England
- Died: 29 May 2019 (aged 76) London, England
- Party: Conservative
- Spouse: Patricia Ann Hunter (m. 1967)
- Children: 3
- Education: Wellington College
- Alma mater: Emmanuel College, Cambridge
- Awards: Knight Bachelor (1996)

William Michael Hardy Spicer, Baron Spicer, PC (22 January 1943 – 29 May 2019) was a British politician and life peer who was a Conservative member of the House of Lords from 2010 until 2019. He served as Member of Parliament for West Worcestershire from 1974 to 2010 and was a minister from 1984 to 1990. He later served as chairman of the 1922 Committee from 2001 to 2010.

== Early life ==
He was born in Bath, Somerset, to Lt. Col. (later Brigadier) Leslie Hardy Spicer and Muriel, daughter of Wallis G. Carter of Bath. Spicer was educated in Vienna, at Gaunts House Preparatory School and Wellington College, and received a degree in economics from Emmanuel College, Cambridge. After graduation, he worked as a financial journalist for The Statist, the Daily Mail and The Sunday Times. He was Director of Conservative Systems Research Centre from 1968 to 1970, and managing director of Economic Models Ltd from 1970 to 1980.

== Parliamentary career ==
Spicer joined the Conservative Party, and at the 1966 general election, he challenged Manny Shinwell in the safe Labour Easington constituency as the youngest parliamentary candidate in the country against the eldest. He stood in Easington again at the 1970 general election before he was elected at the February 1974 general election for South Worcestershire. He represented South Worcestershire until 1997. When boundary changes abolished the constituency; he then moved to the West Worcestershire seat, which he represented until his retirement from the Commons.

After the 1979 general election, which swept the Conservatives to power, he became a Parliamentary private secretary at the Department of Trade. He was later made a Deputy Chairman of the Conservative Party. He became a Parliamentary under-secretary of state at the Department of Transport in 1984 and served until 1987 with specific responsibility for aviation.

In 1987, he moved to the Department of Energy, again as a Parliamentary Under-Secretary, this time with responsibility for electricity and coal. In January 1990, he was promoted to become a Minister of State at the Department of the Environment, but after the ousting of Margaret Thatcher in November 1990, he left the government payroll over his opposition to British participation in the European Exchange Rate Mechanism.

On leaving the government, he became the chairman of the Parliamentary and Scientific Committee in the House of Commons. In 1993, he founded the eurosceptic European Research Group within the Conservative Party. In the 1996 New Year Honours he received a knighthood, with the honour conferred by Queen Elizabeth II on 13 February 1996. Following the 1997 general election he became a member of the Treasury Select Committee.

He was an author and had a number of books published, including The Spicer Diaries.

His majority declined in 1997 in keeping with the general trend across the country, but he kept his seat which had become West Worcestershire after boundary changes that year. His majority almost doubled four years later, at the 2001 general election. However, unlike most other Conservative MPs, he failed to increase his majority in 2005; instead, it was more than halved, and he held one of the Conservatives' most marginal seats against the Liberal Democrats.

Following the 2001 general election, Spicer was elected Chairman of the 1922 Committee, a position that he held until he stood down in 2010.

As chairman of the 1922 Committee, he had the distinction of presiding over more leadership elections than any of his predecessors since Iain Duncan Smith, Michael Howard and David Cameron were all elected during his tenure. This record has now been surpassed by Graham Brady.

In the Commons, he became known for asking short questions, usually of one-sentence questions to government ministers and at Prime Minister's Questions and once simply asking Gordon Brown, "Will the Prime Minister confirm that he will soldier on to the bitter end?" On another occasion, he asked Brown, "Why are there always so many strikes at the end of a Labour government?"

On 26 March 2006, Spicer announced that he would not contest the Worcestershire West seat at the 2010 election and that he would retire as an MP.

== Later life ==
He was created a life peer on 8 July 2010 as Baron Spicer, of Cropthorne in the County of Worcestershire.

He was sworn of the Privy Council on 15 May 2013 at Buckingham Palace; he thus acquired the post-nominal letters "PC" for life.

Coat of arms of Michael Spicer, Baron Spicer
Crest A demi-lion Or resting its sinister paw on a Ministerial Box Proper. Escutcheon Gules a cross moline Argent charged with another Azure between four quill pens in bend sinister Argent quilled Or each surmounted by a paint brush in bend Or the ferrule Argent. Supporters On either side a lion resting the exterior paw on the grip of a tennis racquet the head downwards Or. Motto Et Facere Et Pati Fortia (To Act And Suffer Bravely)

== Death ==
Spicer died at the Cromwell Hospital in Kensington, London, from complications of Parkinson's disease and leukaemia on 29 May 2019.

Parliament of the United Kingdom
Preceded by Gerald Nabarro	Member of Parliament for South Worcestershire; Feb. 1974–1997	Constituency abolished
New constituency	Member of Parliament for West Worcestershire; 1997–2010	Succeeded by Harriett Baldwin
Political offices
Preceded by Archie Hamilton	Chairman of the 1922 Committee; 2001–2010	Succeeded by Graham Brady
Other offices
New title European Research Group founded	Chairman of the European Research Group; 1994–2001	Succeeded by David Heathcoat-Amory
