= Tom Collins (politician) =

British politician

Tom Collins MP
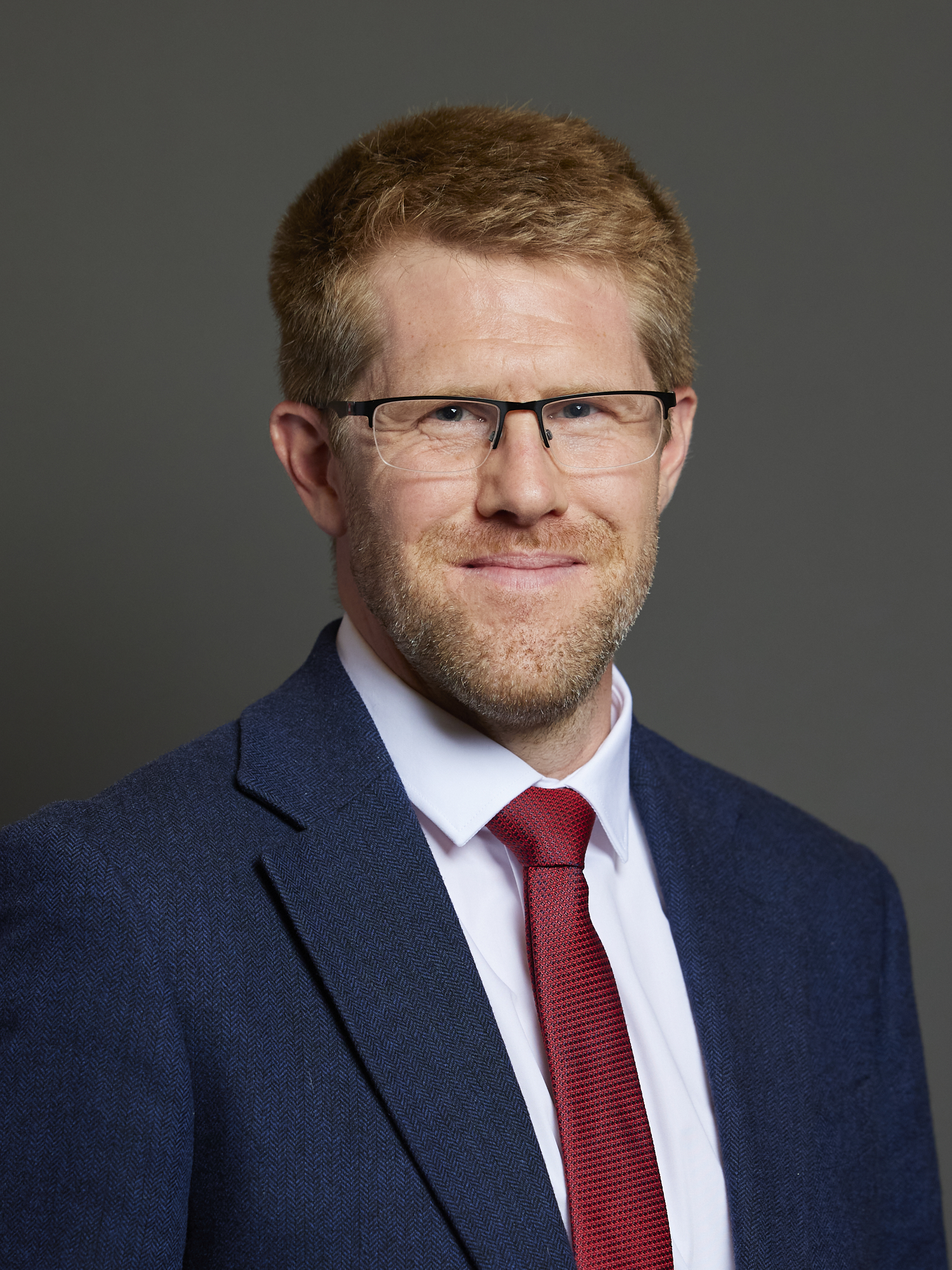
- Official portrait, 2024

Member of Parliament for Worcester
- Incumbent
- Assumed office 4 July 2024
- Preceded by: Robin Walker
- Majority: 7,116 (15.5%)

Personal details
- Party: Labour
- Education: Aston University

Thomas George Howard Collins is a British engineer and Labour Party politician. He has been the Member of Parliament (MP) for Worcester since 2024 having gained the seat from the Conservative Party.

Before becoming an MP, he worked for Worcester, Bosch Group in Worcester for 19 years. Collins reportedly lead "Bosch’s engineering team working on the development of hydrogen-ready boilers". Collins was also a councillor for Worcester City Council from 2018 to 2022 representing the Rainbow Hill ward.

In February 2025, the Daily Telegraph reported that Tom Collins was ranked in the bottom 5 MPs for spoken contributions in Parliament, resulting in criticism in his constituency.

Parliament of the United Kingdom
Preceded by Robin Walker	Member of Parliament for Worcester; 2024–present	Incumbent
