= Eric Knight (politician) =

British politician

Eric Ayshford Knight

Member of Parliament for Kidderminster
- In office 15 January 1910 – 15 November 1922
- Preceded by: Edmund Broughton Barnard
- Succeeded by: John Wardlaw-Milne

Personal details
- Party: Conservative

Major Eric Ayshford Knight was a British Conservative Party politician. He served as a Conservative Party Member of Parliament for Kidderminster between 1910 and 1922.

== Parliamentary career ==
Knight first contested the Kidderminster seat in the January 1910 general election and won the seat. he then kept his seat until the 1922 election. in 1914, Knight campaigned for volunteer soldiers to get paid a soldiers salary.
