= Brooke Robinson =

British politician

Member of Parliament for Dudley
- In office 27 July 1886 – 8 February 1906
- Preceded by: Henry Brinsley Sheridan
- Succeeded by: Arthur George Hooper

Personal details
- Born: Brooke Robinson; 11 September 1836 Dudley, Worcestershire, UK
- Died: 20 October 1911 (aged 75) Barford House, Barford, Warwickshire, UK
- Party: Conservative
- Spouse: Eugenia Collis
- Parents: William Robinson (father); Harriet Johnson (mother)
- Education: Rugby School
- Occupation: Coroner
- Profession: Solicitor

Brooke Robinson (1836–1911) was a British Conservative Party politician, who was MP for Dudley and held a number of public posts including that of County Coroner for Dudley. He also was an art collector and benefactor whose legacy was the Town Hall and a museum in the town of Dudley.

== Early life and education ==
Brooke Robinson, son of William Robinson and Harriet (née Johnson), was born at Dudley on 11 September 1836. His unusual first name, Brooke, was the maiden name of one of his great-great-grandmothers and had subsequently been adopted as a given name by some of her descendants. Robinson was educated at Rugby.

== Legal career ==
He was admitted as an Attorney at Law and Solicitor in Chancery in 1857. He practiced in Dudley until 1874.

He was elected unopposed as county coroner for the Dudley district on 9 August 1860 at a special County Court held at the New Town Hall, Dudley. His father, William Robinson, had been the previous holder of the post.

== Political career ==
Brooke Robinson first stood for Parliament at Dudley in 1885 when he was defeated by the long-established sitting MP, Henry Brinsley Sheridan. Subsequently, however, he was elected four times as MP for Dudley: in 1886, 1892, 1895 and 1900. He represented the Conservative Party during this time. Robinson was the first local man to be elected as MP for Dudley since Thomas Hawkes resigned the position in 1844. Local Tories emphasized this with the slogan 'A Dudley man for Dudley'.

Robinson was a supporter of an 8 hour working day, free education, reform of the Poor Law and industrial arbitration.

He made the decision not to stand for the 1906 election on health grounds.

=== Elections contested ===
==== UK Parliament elections ====
Date of election	Constituency	Party	Votes	%	Result
1885	Dudley	Conservative	5,211	45.0	Not elected (2nd)
1886	Dudley	Conservative	6,475	58.8	Elected
1892	Dudley	Conservative	6,668	54.3	Elected
1895	Dudley	Conservative	6,536	53.0	Elected
1900	Dudley	Conservative	6,461	52.4	Elected

== Personal life ==
Robinson married Eugenia Collis, the daughter of George Richard Collis of Stourton Castle, on 10 March 1870.

He was a lieutenant in the Worcestershire Yeomanry between 1871 and 1877.

Robinson died on 20 October 1911 at his home, Barford House, which is near Warwick, and was buried at St Thomas’s Church, Dudley.

== Legacy ==
Brooke Robinson left a sum of money as well as his collection of art, furniture, ceramics, and other items for the benefit of the town of Dudley. The money was eventually used to construct the Town Hall, a Coroner's Court and a museum. The museum, known as the Brooke Robinson Museum, opened on 18 May 1931. In 1979, the museum trustees agreed to the collection being moved to the Dudley Museum and Art Gallery.

Parliament of the United Kingdom
Preceded by Henry Brinsley Sheridan	Member of Parliament for Dudley; 1886 – 1906	Succeeded by Arthur George Hooper
