= Barnett Stross =

British doctor and politician

Sir Barnett Stross

Parliamentary Secretary to the Ministry of Health
- In office 20 October 1964 – 24 February 1965
- Minister: Kenneth Robinson
- Preceded by: Bernard Braine
- Succeeded by: Charles Loughlin

Member of Parliament for Stoke-on-Trent Central Hanley (1945–1950)
- In office 5 July 1945 – 31 March 1966
- Preceded by: Arthur Hollins
- Succeeded by: Robert Cant

Personal details
- Born: Strasberg; 25 December 1899 Pabianice, Poland
- Died: 13 May 1967 (aged 67) London
- Party: Labour
- Spouse(s): Chesters, Gwendoline Ella
- Relations: Charles Stross, novelist (grand-nephew)
- Education: University of Leeds
- Occupation: Doctor, politician
- Profession: Medical
- Cabinet: Wilson Government of 1964

Sir Barnett Stross (25 December 1899 – 13 May 1967) was a British doctor and politician. He served twenty years as a Labour Party Member of Parliament, famously led the humanitarian campaign "Lidice Shall Live" and pushed for reforms in industry to protect workers. His grand-nephew Charles Stross is an author.

== Early life and education ==
Barnett Stross was born to a Jewish family, originally bearing the name Strasberg, in Poland on 25 December 1899. His parents Samuel and Cecilia, a rabbi's daughter, were married in Poland in 1880. Barnett, called Bob by his family, had eleven siblings. When he was three, his family moved to Dewsbury. Stross was educated at Leeds Grammar School. He then studied medicine at the University of Leeds where he qualified in 1926.

== Medical practice ==
He chose to set up in practice in the Potteries area of north Staffordshire. Two years later he appeared before a committee of inquiry into silicosis as an expert witness on behalf of the pottery workers. His campaign on silicosis became a passionate cause and successive government schemes providing compensation for people suffering from pneumoconiosis and silicosis were established as a result of his campaigning. He successfully launched a media campaign to obtain financial compensation for miners who suffered serious occupational lung disease. Before the existence of a welfare state in Britain, Stross gave medical care without charge to the poorer members of Stoke-on-Trent's communities. In the Second World War, he gave healthy lifestyle lectures on behalf of the Ministry of Food. During one of these lectures, there was an air raid and a German bomb struck the auditorium, leaving Stross seriously injured.

== Early political career ==
Stross became honorary medical adviser to the Pottery Workers' Society in 1926, and joined the Labour Party in 1930. He was also involved with the North Staffordshire Miners' Federation and an active member of the Socialist Medical Association.

In 1937, he was elected to Stoke-on-Trent City Council, on which he served until 1952 (during the later part of this period he was an Alderman). At the 1945 general election Stross was elected as Labour MP for Stoke-on-Trent's Hanley division.

He continued to act as medical adviser to the Potters' Union until 1954. His medical experience was often called upon when other MPs, Lords and members of the public present in the Palace of Westminster felt ill. He concentrated on industrial illnesses and opposed smoking because of the lung damage caused.

== "Lidice Shall Live!" ==
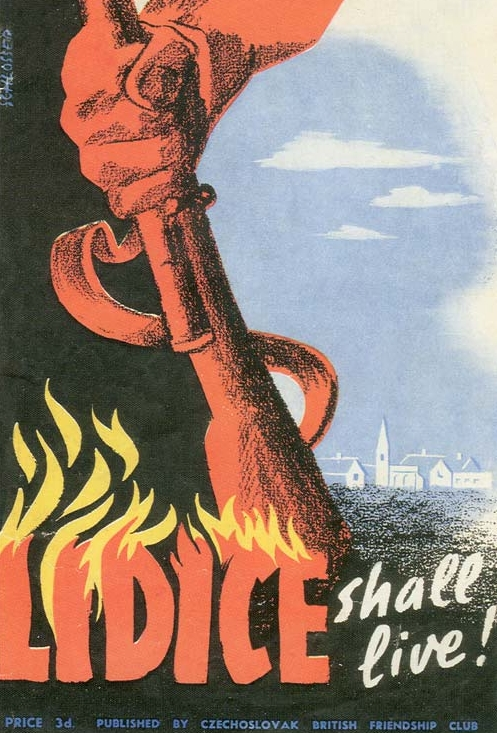
A "Lidice shall live" poster

Stross did not confine himself to medical issues. He also led a campaign to rebuild Lidice, a Czechoslovak village which had been destroyed by Nazi forces during the Second World War in a 1942 massacre under orders from Adolf Hitler, who was enraged by the assassination of Reinhard Heydrich by British-trained Czech resistance fighters. On 10 June 1942 Nazi soldiers entered Lidice and ultimately killed all of the village's men. Women and children were separated and taken to the Ravensbrück concentration camp. Only 146 of the women are known to have survived, while 88 children were killed; only 17 younger children survived the tragedy having been placed with German families (these children returned to Lidice after the war). Lidice was then razed to the ground in order to wipe it off the map for ever. News of the tragedy soon reached the rest of the world as it was filmed and broadcast by the Nazis.

Stross was deeply affected by the Lidice tragedy. Immediately after news of the event reached Stoke-on-Trent he spoke to miners and their leaders, proposing the reconstruction of the village of Lidice to commemorate this crime against humanity forever. On the afternoon of Sunday 6 September, in The Victoria Hall, the "Lidice Shall Live" movement was formed in the presence of Czechoslovak President, Edvard Beneš, Will Lawther, President of the Miners' Federation, and Soviet Ambassador Bogomolov. The name of the movement came about in defiant response to Adolf Hitler's proclamation that "Lidice shall die". Barnett Stross vehemently replied, "Lidice Shall Live!"

An audience of 3,000 men and women heard Dr Beneš's concluding remarks: "This meeting has made it clear that Lidice has not died: it lives on in the hearts of the people of Stoke-on-Trent at least. From now on, Stoke-on-Trent will live forever in the heart of every Czech citizen".

In the months that followed, from its base in Stoke-on-Trent fund-raising campaigns were organised, collecting donations from British miners and workers to pay for the construction of a new Lidice. In 1947 Lidice began to be rebuilt with the help of the £32,000 raised by people from the Potteries, this included more than 150 modern state of the art homes. In 1955 Barnett led an initiative to construct the world's largest rose garden with 23,000 roses donated by numerous countries around the world. For this work, on 18 June 1947 Stross was honoured by the Czechoslovak government with the White Lion of Czechoslovakia, and he became Chair of the British-Czechoslovakia Society, using this position to highlight human rights abuses under the Communist government.

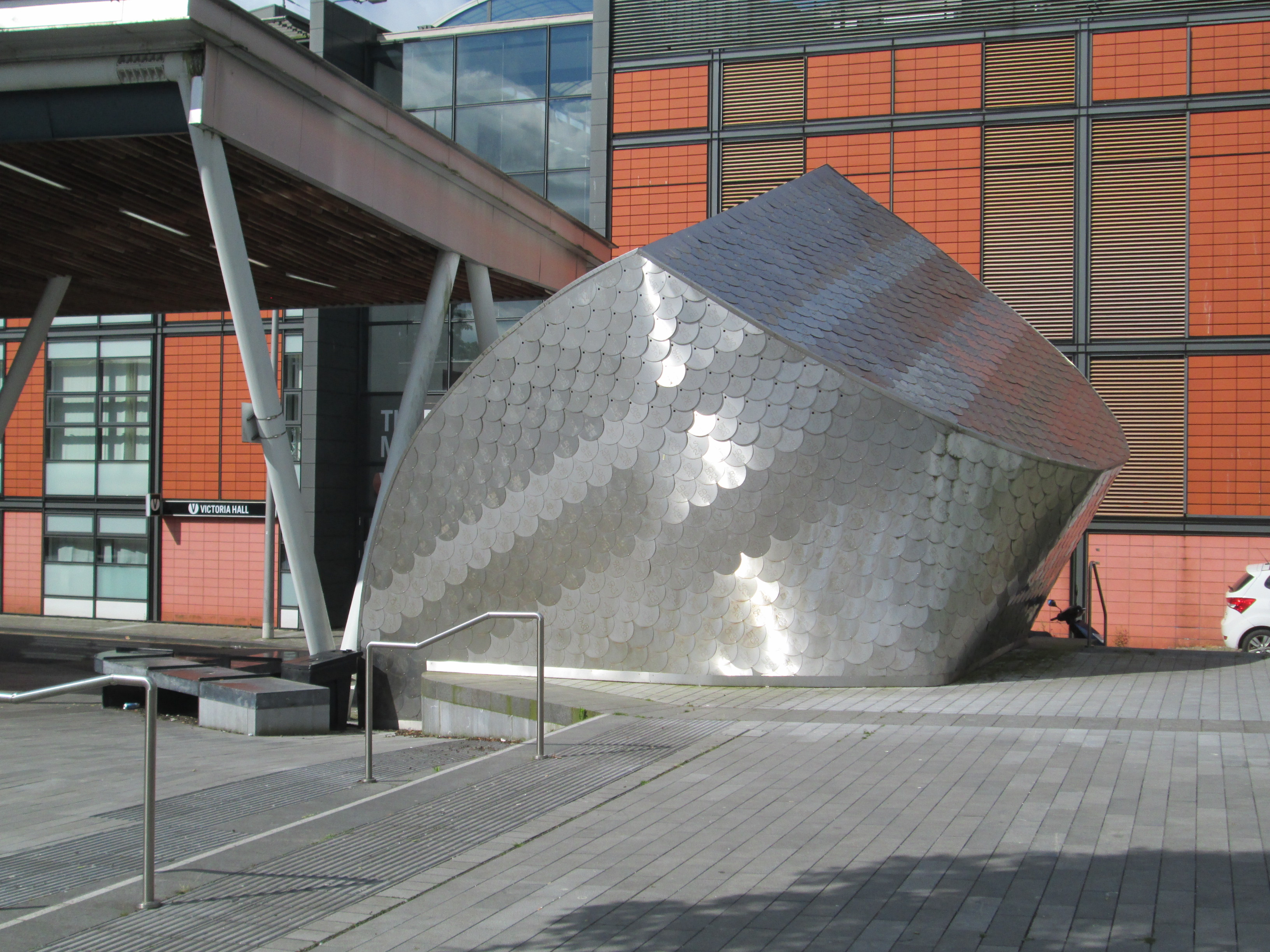
"Unearthed", by Dashyline, on Lidice Way, Hanley; a sculpture dedicated to unearthing Stoke-on-Trent's link with Lidice.

Sir Barnett Stross considered the establishment of the movement to support Lidice, its genesis in Stoke-on-Trent, but growing worldwide, his greatest personal success. He said that the success lay neither in the big sum that had been collected for the rebuilding of Lidice nor in the beautiful Rose Garden nor in the Lidice Collection which he had founded. He saw the success in the fact that the news about the slaughter of innocent people had flown around the world, converting the crime committed by the Nazis into a weapon of peace.

In October 2013 a sculpture commemorating the Lidice Shall Live movement was unveiled. The 6.8-metre-high (22 ft) steel sculpture cost £100,000 to build and features 3,000 tags bearing the initials of people who promise to share the story of the movement. North Staffordshire-based Dashyline was commissioned by Stoke-on-Trent City Council to create the artwork, which has been installed near Hanley bus station and took three years to complete.

=== A new Lidice ===
The decision of the Czechoslovak government to rebuild the village of Lidice was made public at the first ceremonial commemoration on 10 June 1945. Two months later the architectural competition was announced and in 1947 the development of the new Lidice began. Over some years, 150 detached houses were built for the women survivors, with a community centre, museum, shopping centre and the building which housed "the people's committee". The movement "Lidice Shall Live" made an important financial contribution in the region of £1m in today's money. Barnett Stross visited Lidice several times. He considered it a great personal honour to be awarded the Freedom of Lidice on 21 June 1957.

The support from the Stoke-on-Trent movement did not end even after the new Lidice had been built. After the financial support another idea of Stross's saw the light of day in 1954 – to found the Friendship and Peace Rose Garden, linking symbolically the bare plain of the original Lidice with the newly built village. Stross, in his plea for contributions, called it, "A fragrant symbol of the need for all nations of the world to live together in peace and friendship". The Rose Garden, the largest in the world, received roses from all over the world. The largest assortment came from the UK, credit for which went to the well known rose growers, the Wheatcroft's from Ruddington, near Nottingham. The inhabitants of Lidice showed their appreciation by planting a lime avenue which was named after Barnett Stross.

== The arts ==
Stross's lifelong love was art. In 1945 he became a co-founder of the Arts & Amenities Group of the Parliamentary Labour Party. He was able to enthuse Conservative as well as Labour politicians for art. He played a key role in retaining a work by Leonardo da Vinci - The Virgin and Child with Saint Anne and Saint John the Baptist Cartoon for the UK. As a member of the Historical Buildings Council he ensured the preservation of some industrial buildings as a reminder of the industrial revolution in England. Thanks to Barnett Stross, North Staffordshire gained many precious works of art. He bequeathed his large art collection to the Keele University, of which he was a co-founder. The collection consisted mainly of pictures, sculptures and objets d'art of the 19th and 20th centuries. He was awarded the honorary degree of Doctor of Science by Keele University on 30 June 1965. He was instrumental in the establishment of the recently refurbished Mitchell Memorial Theatre.

In 1962, making use of his artistic contacts, he invited artists from all over the world to donate their works to Lidice to establish a museum of art symbolizing the solidarity of artists with the Lidice tragedy. Many artists responded to the invitation, among them: J. Beuys, G. Richter, E. Vedova, R. Guttuso, S. Polke, R. Opalka, L. Survage, P. Blake and W. Vostell. The themes and the techniques were not defined. Thanks to this open invitation, the rapidly growing collection assumed its heterogeneous character, compromising many different forms influenced by the ideologies and art styles of that time. Today the collection contains 433 works of art by 331 artists from 34 countries including the UK. It has been on display at the Lidice Gallery of the Lidice Memorial since 2003.

== Ministerial career ==
Stross received a knighthood in the New Years' Honours list of 1964. When Labour won the 1964 general election, he was appointed Parliamentary Secretary to the Ministry of Health. He left office in February 1965 and in July 1965 announced his retirement from the House of Commons due to concerns about his own health. He stood down at the 1966 general election. Barnett Stross died at University College London on 14 May 1967.

He devoted the largest part of his life to his political career, playing a major role in the development of relations between the UK and Czechoslovakia, the renewal of the village of Lidice and the protection of workers against industrial disease. As a member of the Foreign Affairs Select Committee he kept in touch with Czechoslovakia.

== Espionage claims ==
Two years after Stross' death, the Czech intelligence defector Josef Frolík named him as having been an agent of Czechoslovakia. According to Frolík, Stross (code-named "Gustav") had provided "interesting information about the domestic and foreign policies of the Labour Party while it was in opposition". Stephen Dorril and Robin Ramsay's book Smear! Wilson and the Secret State claims that such information as Stross supplied could have been obtained by requesting it in writing to Transport House (the then-headquarters of the Labour Party).

== Legacy ==
Stross donated the land in Hanley on which his house stood and then helped raise funds to build what is now the Mitchell Arts Centre. In recognition of his lifetime of great works two roads in Little Chell, Stoke-on-Trent, were named after him by the city council he used to serve on.

== Sources ==
- M. Stenton and S. Lees, Who's Who of British MPs Vol. IV (Harvester Press, 1981)
- Obituary, The Times, 15 May 1967.

Political offices
Preceded by The Marquess of Lothian	Parliamentary Secretary to the Ministry of Health; 1964–1965	Succeeded by Charles Loughlin
Parliament of the United Kingdom
Preceded by Arthur Hollins	Member of Parliament for Hanley; 1945 – 1950	Constituency abolished
New constituency	Member of Parliament for Stoke-on-Trent Central; 1950 – 1966	Succeeded by Robert Cant
