= William Edward Robinson =

English politician

Robinson in 1917

William Edward Robinson (1863 – 10 May 1927) was an English merchant and Liberal Party politician.

== Family and career ==
Robinson was born in Burslem, Staffordshire the son of William Robinson of Stoke on Trent. He married in 1892. By profession he was a potter's merchant and in religion he was a member of the United Methodist Church. His grandson was Neville Robinson physicist.

== Local politics ==
He was an elected member of Stoke on Trent council, becoming an Alderman and was later Mayor of the town circa 1918 for three years in succession. He had a particular interest in housing and transport issues.

== Parliament ==
He stood for Parliament only once being elected Liberal MP for Stoke-on-Trent, Burslem at the 1923 general election. In a straight fight (apparently with Unionist support) he defeated the sitting Labour MP, Andrew MacLaren by the narrow margin of 63 votes, just 0.2% of the total poll.

Robinson, perhaps mindful of his local arrangement with the Conservatives, voted against his own party in the division which brought in the first Labour government. Robinson was also one of a minority of Liberal MPs who voted with the Tories to force a debate on unemployment in May 1924 and again on an employment issue in August. He decided not to defend his Burslem seat in 1924 when Labour was opposed by a Constitutionalist candidate, the former Liberal William Allen. Allen later won election in Burslem at the 1931 general election. Constitutionalist was a label used by some anti-socialist candidates in UK general elections in the early 1920s. Most of the candidates were former Liberal Party members, and many of them joined the Conservative Party soon after being elected. The best known Constitutionalist candidate was Winston Churchill.

Robinson did not try to re-enter the House of Commons.

== Death ==
Robinson died on 10 May 1927 aged 63 years.

Parliament of the United Kingdom
Preceded by Andrew MacLaren	Member of Parliament for Stoke-on-Trent, Burslem; 1923 – 1924	Succeeded by Andrew MacLaren
