= 1912 Hanley by-election =

UK parliamentary by-election

The 1912 Hanley by-election was a by-election held for the British House of Commons constituency of Hanley on 13 July 1912.

== Vacancy ==
The seat had become vacant on 28 June 1912 when the sitting Labour Member of Parliament (MP), 60-year-old Enoch Edwards died. Edwards had represented the constituency since gaining it from the Unionists at the 1906 general election as a Liberal candidate. In 1909, Edwards crossed from Liberal to Labour in accordance with the wishes of his trade union. Even though he contested both the 1910 general elections as a Labour candidate, he was still supported by the Liberal Party.

Enoch Edwards

General election December 1910:
| Party | Candidate | Votes | % | ±% |
|---|---|---|---|---|
| Labour | Enoch Edwards | 8,343 | 64.2 | +0.3 |
| Conservative | George Herman Rittner | 4,658 | 35.8 | −0.3 |
| Majority | | 3,685 | 28.4 | +0.6 |
| Turnout | | 13,001 | 78.6 | −8.5 |
| Labour hold | | Swing | +0.3 | |

== Candidates ==
The Conservative candidate was George Rittner, who was standing here for the third time. The Labour candidate was Samuel Finney. Unlike Enoch Edwards, Finney had no sympathies with the Liberal party, so the local Liberal Association considered fielding a candidate. A neighbouring Liberal MP, Josiah Wedgwood encouraged his friend, R. L. Outhwaite to stand as a Liberal Party candidate. Liberal Chancellor of the Exchequer, David Lloyd George was looking towards a Liberal Land Campaign to gain support for a reform of land taxation to introduce a 'Single Tax'. Like Josiah Wedgwood, Outhwaite was a strong supporter of the 'Single Tax'. The local Liberal Association therefore adopted Outhwaite as candidate to campaign on a 'Single Tax' platform.

== Campaign ==
The Liberal campaign received a boost when John Redmond, the Leader of the nationalist Irish Parliamentary Party, sent a letter of support to Outhwaite due to his support for the Liberal Government's Irish Home Rule Bill.

== Result ==
RL Outhwaite

1912 Hanley by-election
| Party | Candidate | Votes | % | ±% |
|---|---|---|---|---|
| Liberal | R. L. Outhwaite | 6,647 | 46.4 | New |
| Conservative | George Herman Rittner | 5,993 | 41.8 | +6.0 |
| Labour | Samuel Finney | 1,694 | 11.8 | −52.4 |
| Majority | | 654 | 4.6 | N/A |
| Turnout | | 14,334 | 85.1 | +6.5 |
| Liberal gain from Labour | | Swing | | |

The result was a boost for Lloyd George's land reform campaign and shortly afterwards, H. H. Asquith agreed to commit the Liberal government to a reform of land taxation. It also demonstrated that the Liberal Party could be successful against the Labour Party by pursuing a radical agenda.

== See also ==
- Political Change and the Labour Party 1900-1918 by Duncan Tanner.
- The Political Life of Josiah C. Wedgwood by Paul Mulvey.
- Liberals: A History of the Liberal and Liberal Democrat Parties by Roy Douglas
