= Hanley (constituency) =

Former borough constituency in England

- Former borough constituency for the House of Commons
- County: Staffordshire

1885–1950
- Seats: One
- Created from: Stoke-upon-Trent
- Replaced by: Stoke-on-Trent Central

Hanley was a borough constituency in Staffordshire which returned one Member of Parliament (MP) to the House of Commons of the Parliament of the United Kingdom between 1885 and 1950. Elections were held using the first past the post voting system.

== History ==
The constituency was created for the 1885 general election. Before this, since 1832 a parliamentary borough of Stoke-upon-Trent had existed, covering almost the whole of what is now the Stoke-on-Trent conurbation and electing two MPs. In 1885, this was split into two constituencies electing a single member each, Stoke-upon-Trent in the south and Hanley in the north. Hanley became a parliamentary borough in its own right, and shortly afterwards also became a county borough.

The Hanley constituency in the 1885 to 1918 period included Burslem, as well as Hanley itself, and was one of the most populous urban constituencies in the country, with more than 100,000 inhabitants by the time of the First World War. Its main economic base was pottery, though both towns included substantial numbers of coal miners as well as pottery workers. Predominantly working class, it could be normally be considered a safe Liberal seat; however, the Conservatives managed a narrow victory as part of their national landslide in 1900, perhaps helped by lack of enthusiasm among the potters for the Liberal candidate, Enoch Edwards, who was one of the leaders of the miners' union. Edwards convincingly recaptured the seat in 1906, and with the rest of his union joined the Labour Party in 1909. At the by-election after his death, however, the Liberals regained the seat, with the Labour candidate a poor third.

By the time of the general election of 1918, the county borough of Hanley had been absorbed into an enlarged county borough of Stoke-on-Trent, and in the boundary changes implemented in that year the same process took place at parliamentary level. The new parliamentary borough of Stoke-on-Trent was accorded three seats in place of the two which the area had had since 1885, and was divided into three single-member constituencies, of which Stoke-on-Trent, Hanley was one. The new division was smaller than the old constituency, Burslem now having a seat of its own, and quickly became a safe Labour seat, though the Conservatives won it in their landslide year of 1931.

Hanley was abolished for the 1950 general election, being largely replaced by the new Stoke-on-Trent Central constituency.

== Boundaries ==
1885–1918: The municipal boroughs of Hanley and Burslem, and so much of the parliamentary borough of Stoke-upon-Trent as lay to the north of Hanley, and was not included in the local government district of Tunstall.

1918-1950: The County Borough of Stoke-on-Trent wards numbers nine, ten, eleven, twelve, thirteen, fourteen, fifteen, and sixteen.

== Members of Parliament ==
Election	Member	Party
1885	William Woodall	Liberal
1900	Arthur Heath	Conservative
1906	Enoch Edwards	Lib-Lab
1909	Enoch Edwards	Labour
1912 by-election	R. L. Outhwaite	Liberal
1918	James Andrew Seddon	Coalition NDP
1922	Myles Harper Parker	Labour
1924	Samuel Clowes	Labour
1928 by-election	Arthur Hollins	Labour
1931	Harold Hales	Conservative
1935	Arthur Hollins	Labour
1945	Barnett Stross	Labour
1950	constituency abolished	

== Elections ==
=== Elections in the 1880s ===
General election 1885: Hanley
Party	Candidate	Votes	%	±%
Liberal	William Woodall	6,136	69.1	
Conservative	Francis Vers Wright	2,739	30.9	
Majority		3,397	38.2	
Turnout		8,875	80.9	
Registered electors		10,970		
Liberal win (new seat)				

General election 1886: Hanley
Party	Candidate	Votes	%	±%
Liberal	William Woodall	Unopposed		
Liberal hold				

=== Elections in the 1890s ===
General election 1892: Hanley
Party	Candidate	Votes	%	±%
Liberal	William Woodall	5,825	59.3	N/A
Conservative	Arthur Heath	3,993	40.7	New
Majority		1,832	18.6	N/A
Turnout		9,818	77.1	N/A
Registered electors		12,742		
Liberal hold		Swing	N/A	

General election 1895: Hanley
Party	Candidate	Votes	%	±%
Liberal	William Woodall	5,653	51.3	−8.0
Conservative	Arthur Heath	5,367	48.7	+8.0
Majority		286	2.6	−16.0
Turnout		11,020	85.4	+8.3
Registered electors		12,897		
Liberal hold		Swing	−8.0	

=== Elections in the 1900s ===
General election 1900: Hanley
Party	Candidate	Votes	%	±%
Conservative	Arthur Heath	6,586	52.6	+3.9
Lib-Lab	Enoch Edwards	5,944	47.4	−3.9
Majority		642	5.2	N/A
Turnout		12,530	78.4	−7.0
Registered electors		15,983		
Conservative gain from Liberal		Swing	+3.9	

General election 1906: Hanley
Party	Candidate	Votes	%	±%
Lib-Lab	Enoch Edwards	9,183	68.2	+20.8
Conservative	Arthur Heath	4,287	31.8	−20.8
Majority		4,896	36.4	N/A
Turnout		13,470	83.4	+5.0
Registered electors		16,156		
Lib-Lab gain from Conservative		Swing	+20.8	

=== Elections in the 1910s ===
Enoch Edwards

General election January 1910: Hanley
Party	Candidate	Votes	%	±%
Labour	Enoch Edwards	9,199	63.9	−4.3
Conservative	George Herman Rittner	5,202	36.1	+4.3
Majority		3,997	27.8	N/A
Turnout		14,401	87.1	+3.7
Labour gain from Lib-Lab		Swing	-4.3	

General election December 1910: Hanley
Party	Candidate	Votes	%	±%
Labour	Enoch Edwards	8,343	64.2	+0.3
Conservative	George Herman Rittner	4,658	35.8	−0.3
Majority		3,685	28.4	+0.6
Turnout		13,001	78.6	−8.5
Labour hold		Swing	+0.3	

RL Outhwaite

1912 Hanley by-election
Party	Candidate	Votes	%	±%
Liberal	R. L. Outhwaite	6,647	46.4	New
Conservative	George Herman Rittner	5,993	41.8	+6.0
Labour	Samuel Finney	1,694	11.8	−52.4
Majority		654	4.6	N/A
Turnout		14,334	85.1	+6.5
Liberal gain from Labour		Swing		

A General Election was due to take place by the end of 1915. By the autumn of 1914, the following candidates had been adopted to contest that election. Due to the outbreak of war, the election never took place.

- Liberal Party: R. L. Outhwaite
- Labour Party: Myles Parker
- Unionist Party: George Herman Rittner

General election 14 December 1918: Hanley
Party		Candidate	Votes	%	±%
C	National Democratic	James Seddon	8,032	40.4	New
	Labour	Myles Parker	7,697	38.7	−35.5
	Independent Liberal	R. L. Outhwaite	2,703	13.6	N/A
	Liberal	Leonard Lumsden Grimwade	1,459	7.3	N/A
Majority			335	1.7	N/A
Turnout			19,891	58.9	−19.7
	National Democratic gain from Liberal		Swing		
C indicates candidate endorsed by the coalition government.

=== Elections in the 1920s ===
General election 1922: Hanley
Party	Candidate	Votes	%	±%
Labour	Myles Parker	10,742	48.8	+10.1
National Liberal	James Seddon	6,312	28.7	−11.7
Liberal	John Howard Whitehouse	4,942	22.5	+15.2
Majority		4,430	20.1	N/A
Turnout		21,996	67.4	+8.5
Labour gain from National Democratic		Swing	+10.9	

General election 1923: Hanley
Party	Candidate	Votes	%	±%
Labour	Myles Parker	11,508	53.3	+4.5
Unionist	James Seddon	5,817	26.9	−1.8
Liberal	Ada Rowley Moody	4,268	19.8	−2.7
Majority		5,691	26.4	+6.3
Turnout		21,593	63.7	−3.7
Labour hold		Swing	+3.1	

General election 1924: Hanley
Party	Candidate	Votes	%	±%
Labour	Samuel Clowes	13,527	53.0	−0.3
Unionist	Frank Collis	11,976	47.0	+20.1
Majority		1,554	6.0	−20.4
Turnout		25,503	73.5	+9.8
Labour hold		Swing	-10.2	

1928 Hanley by-election
Party	Candidate	Votes	%	±%
Labour	Arthur Hollins	15,136	60.2	+7.2
Unionist	Alfred Denville	6,604	26.3	−20.7
Liberal	Walter Meakin	3,390	13.5	New
Majority		8,532	33.9	+27.9
Turnout		25,130	69.9	−3.6
Labour hold		Swing	+14.0	

General election 1929: Hanley
Party	Candidate	Votes	%	±%
Labour	Arthur Hollins	20,785	62.1	+1.9
Unionist	Eric Errington	9,022	26.9	+0.6
Liberal	Charles White	3,696	11.0	−2.5
Majority		11,763	35.2	+1.3
Turnout		33,503	72.5	+2.6
Labour hold		Swing	+0.6	

=== Elections in the 1930s ===
General election 1931: Hanley
Party	Candidate	Votes	%	±%
Conservative	Harold Hales	18,262	53.01	
Labour	Arthur Hollins	15,245	44.25	
Commonwealth Land Party	J. W. Graham Peace	946	2.75	New
Majority		3,017	8.76	N/A
Turnout		34,453	72.64	
Conservative gain from Labour		Swing		

General election 1935: Hanley
Party	Candidate	Votes	%	±%
Labour	Arthur Hollins	17,211	52.01	
Conservative	Harold Hales	15,880	47.99	
Majority		1,331	4.02	
Turnout		33,091	69.79	
Labour gain from Conservative		Swing		

General Election 1939–40

Another General Election was required to take place before the end of 1940. The political parties had been making preparations for an election to take place and by the Autumn of 1939, the following candidates had been selected;

- Labour: Barnett Stross
- Liberal National: Frederick L Boult

=== Elections in the 1940s ===
General election 1945: Hanley
Party	Candidate	Votes	%	±%
Labour	Barnett Stross	21,915	68.00	
Conservative	JPAL Doran	10,313	32.00	
Majority		11,602	36.00	
Turnout		32,228	73.64	
Labour hold		Swing		
