= Ceramic and Allied Trades Union =

United Kingdom trade union

- Merged into: GMB
- Founded: 1906
- Dissolved: 16 April 2015
- Headquarters: Hillcrest House, Garth Street, Stoke-on-Trent
- Location: United Kingdom
- Members: 40,000 (1919); 11,824 (1946); 3,906 (2013)
- Publication: The Potter
- Affiliations: TUC, Labour Party
- Website: www.unitytheunion.org.uk

The Ceramic and Allied Trades Union (CATU) was a trade union representing pottery workers in the United Kingdom.

== Predecessors ==
The first significant union in the pottery trades was founded in 1827 as the National Union of Operative Potters, affiliated to the National Association for the Protection of Labour. Based in the Potteries, it was the first union to actively recruit members from outside the area, and focused its efforts on building its strength, and opposing the worst truck shops. While the union collapsed in 1837, a loose federation named the United Branches of Operative Potters, which had been founded by some of its members three years before, ensured trade unionism survived in the industry.

The United Branches initially thrived, and in 1845 it was a major shareholder in the National Association of United Trades for the Employment of Labour, but this led to disputes which in 1846 led the union to collapse. Secretary William Evans formed the controversial Potters Emigration Society, taking up fears around mechanisation to encourage potters to move to Pottersville, Wisconsin, although that scheme also foundered by 1848.

From the 1840s until the 1900s, workers in the industry, if unionised at all, were part of very small, sectional unions. Only the United Overmen's Society, with 700 members in 1866, and the Hollow-ware Pressers' Society, which peaked at 1,400 members in 1873, were of any size.

== History ==
In 1906, the Amalgamated Society of Hollow-ware Pressers merged with the China Potters' Federation and the Printers' and Transferrers' Society, forming the National Amalgamated Society of Male and Female Pottery Workers. This was joined by the National Amalgamated Operative White Potters of Scotland later in the year, the China Furniture and Electrical Appliance Throwers' and Turners' Society in 1907, and the Society of Operative Pottery Engravers, the Associated Stoneware Throwers, and the Bristol Stoneware Society in 1908. It opened branches in many other towns across the country, including one in London 1907. The union also became prominent in the International Federation of Pottery Workers.

In 1919, the United Ovenmen's Society and the Packers' Association joined the union, which renamed itself as the National Society of Pottery Workers, with 40,000 members. This membership fell during the 1920s and much of the 1930s, as the Great Depression hit, and the union struggled to increase the low wages paid in the industry. However, from 1933 the union was able to more than cover its costs, and in 1937 membership more than doubled, to 24,323. The British Pottery Manufacturers' Association began encouraging workers to join the union, hoping to prevent low-end manufacturers from undercutting its members.

After World War II, the workforce in the British pottery industry declined, but the union increased membership density, and by 1975, 75.3% of pottery workers in the UK held membership of the union. During the 1950s, the union engaged with compulsory arbitration, but ended this in 1960, feeling it achieved little. In 1965, the union threatened to strike in order to improve wages.

In 1970, the union became the Ceramic and Allied Trades Union, and it announced that it would recruit workers from all areas of the pottery industry, other than managers - this included areas such as clerical staff, electricians and maintenance workers, but these areas were already covered by other unions, and following various disputes, it largely withdrew from them. In 1975, the union signed a closed shop agreement with the British Pottery Manufacturers' Federation, although workers who did not wish to join could pay the equivalent amount to a charity. The agreement also established an approach to calculating wage increases, and gave workers two extra days holiday each year. This achieved most of the union's long-term aims.

Employment in the pottery industry continued to decline, and by 2006, the union's membership was down to 7,239. In the hope of recruiting workers in other industries, it changed its name to Unity. In 2015, the union merged into the GMB.

== Election results ==
The union sponsored its general secretary as a Labour Party candidate in several Parliamentary elections.

| Election | Constituency | Candidate | Votes | Percentage | Position |
|---|---|---|---|---|---|
| 1924 general election | Hanley | Samuel Clowes | 13,527 | 53.0 | 1 |
| 1928 by-election | Hanley | Arthur Hollins | 15,136 | 60.2 | 1 |
| 1929 general election | Hanley | Arthur Hollins | 20,785 | 62.1 | 1 |
| 1931 general election | Hanley | Arthur Hollins | 15,245 | 44.3 | 2 |
| 1935 general election | Hanley | Arthur Hollins | 17,211 | 52.0 | 1 |

== Leadership ==
=== General Secretaries ===
1906: Joseph Lovatt
1918: Samuel Clowes
1928: Arthur Hollins
1947: Harold Hewitt
1964: Alf Dulson
1975: Les Sillitoe
1980: Alf Clowes
1996: Geoff Bagnall
2012: Harry Hockaday

=== Assistant General Secretaries ===
1947: Albert Goodwin
1955: Steve Hobson
1966: Les Sillitoe
1975: Alf Clowes
1980: Harold Hammersley
Garry Oakes
