= List of lord mayors of Stoke-on-Trent =

The position of Lord Mayor of Stoke-on-Trent is largely ceremonial, determined by a vote amongst the elected councillors of Stoke-on-Trent City Council. Candidates are selected from the councillors. The lord mayor for 2022 to 2023 is Faisal Hussain, a Conservative.

== History ==
Between 1910 and 1928 the Borough, and later, City of Stoke-on-Trent had a mayor rather than a lord mayor. The first Mayor of Stoke-on-Trent was Cecil Wedgwood of the Wedgwood pottery dynasty. The title of Lord Mayor was first conferred on the City of Stoke-on-Trent by King George V on 10 July 1928.

=== List of former mayors ===
- 1901-02 T. R. Yoxall (Conservative)
- 1902-03 T. R. Yoxall (re-elected)

=== List of former lord mayors ===
- 1927-28 Thomas Wild (Independent)
- 1928-29 William Leason (Independent)
- 1929-30 George Barber (Labour)
- 1930-31 Herbert Colclough (Independent)
- 1931-32 Florence Farmer (Labour)
- 1932-33 Thomas Mitchell (Independent)
- 1933-34 Arthur Hollins (Labour), MP for Stoke-on Trent
- 1934-35 Alfred Harvey (Independent)
- 1935-36 John H. Dale (Labour)
- 1936-37 John A. Dale (Independent)
- 1937-38 George Timmis (Labour)
- 1938-39 John Barker (Independent)
- 1939-40 William Holdcroft (Labour)
- 1940-41 Arthur Hewitt (Independent)
- 1941-42 Henry McBrine (Labour)
- 1942-43 Charles Brook (Independent)
- 1943-44 Arthur Austin (Labour)
- 1944-45 William Herbert Kemp (Independent)
- 1945-46 Percy Williams (Labour)
- 1946-47 Harry Leason (Independent)
- 1947-49 Henry Beresford (Labour) (two years)
- 1949-50 Arthur Spark (Independent)
- 1950-51 Henry Hopwood (Labour)
- 1951-52 Horace Barks (Labour)
- 1952-53 George Barber (Labour)
- 1953-54 Albert Bennett (Labour)
- 1954-55 Annie Barker (Labour)
- 1955-56 Harold Naylor (Labour)
- 1956-57 William Bailey (Labour)
- 1957-58 Arthur Perry (Labour)
- 1958-59 Samuel Capewell (Labour)
- 1959-60 Harold Clowes (Labour)
- 1960-61 Gordon Dale (Labour)
- 1961-62 William Hancock (Conservative)
- 1962-63 Thomas Beddow (Labour)
- 1963-64 James Westwood (Labour)
- 1964-65 Joseph Hulme (Labour)
- 1965-66 James Boon (Labour)
- 1966-67 James Evans (Labour)
- 1967-68 Edwin Holloway (Independent)
- 1968-69 Doris Robinson (Labour)
- 1969-70 Arthur Moran (Labour)
- 1970-71 Mary Bourne (Labour)
- 1971-72 Arthur Cholerton (Labour)
- 1972-73 Bill Austin (Labour) (1st Term)
- 1973-74 Arthur Cotton (Labour)
- 1974-75 Harry Smallwood (Labour)
- 1975-76 Dennis Shotton (Labour)
- 1976-77 William Screen (Labour)
- 1977-78 Ron Southern (Labour)
- 1978-79 William Wass (Conservative)
- 1979-80 Mary Stringer (Labour)
- 1980-81 John Wallis (Labour)
- 1981-82 Les Sillitoe (Labour)
- 1982-83 Thomas Brennan (Labour)
- 1983-84 Doug Brown (Labour) (1st Term)
- 1984-85 Jack Dimmock (Labour)
- 1985-86 John Birkin (Labour) (1st Term)
- 1986-87 Harry Oakes (Labour)
- 1987-88 Gordon Tuck (Labour)
- 1988-89 Alan Edwards (Labour)
- 1989-90 Stan Bate (Labour)
- 1990-91 Sybil Halfpenny (Labour)
- 1991-92 Lily Wall (Labour)
- 1992-93 Alan Jones (Labour)
- 1993-94 Marian Beckett (Labour)
- 1994-95 Richard Leigh (Labour)
- 1995-96 James Dunn (Labour)
- 1996-97 John Birkin (Labour) (2nd Term)
- 1997-98 Doug Brown (Labour) (2nd Term)
- 1998-99 Kath Banks (Labour)
- 1999-2000 Reg Booth (Labour)

== 21st century ==
- 2000-01 Barbara Dunn (Labour)
- 2001-02 Bill Austin (Labour) (2nd Term)
- 2002-03 Ellis Bevan (Liberal Democrat)
- 2003-04 Clive Brian (Conservative)
- 2004-05 Karamat Ali (Labour)
- 2005-06 Maurice Lewis (Labour)
- 2006-07 Jean Edwards (Labour)
- 2007-08 Bagh Ali (Labour)
- 2008-09 Derek Capey (City Independent)
- 2009-10 Jean Bowers (Liberal Democrat) (1st term)
- 2010-11 Denver Tolley (Labour)
- 2011-12 Terry Follows (City Independent)
- 2012-13 Terry Crowe (Labour)
- 2013-14 Sheila Pitt (Labour)
- 2014-15 Majid Khan (Labour)
- 2015–16 Jean Bowers (City Independent) (2nd term)
- 2016–17 Anthony Munday (City Independent)
- 2017–18 Ross Irving (Conservative and Independent Alliance) (1st term)
- 2018–19 Lilian Dodd (City Independent)
- 2019–20 Jackie Barnes (City Independent)
- 2020–21 Ross Irving (Conservative and Independent Alliance) (2nd term)
- 2021–22 Chandra Kanneganti (Conservative)
- 2022–23 Faisal Hussain (Conservative)
- 2023- 24 Majid Khan ( Labour)
- 2024-25 Lyn Sharpe ( Labour )
- 2025-26 Steve Watkins ( Labour )
- 2026-27 Joan Bell (Labour)
