= Commonwealth Land Party =

Commonwealth Land Party could refer to:

- Commonwealth Land Party (UK), active from 1919 until 1954
- Commonwealth Land Party, alternative name of the Single Tax Party, active in the United States in the 1910s and 1920s.
