= Commonwealth Party =

Commonwealth Party may refer to:

- Commonwealth Party, a defunct political association from 18th century Britain
- Commonwealth Party (Gibraltar), a defunct political party in Gibraltar
- Commonwealth Party (New South Wales), a defunct political party in Australia
- Common Wealth Party, a defunct political party in the United Kingdom
- Commonwealth Land Party (UK), a defunct political party in the United Kingdom
- Party for the Commonwealth of Canada, a defunct political party in Canada, often referred to as the "Commonwealth Party"
