= Ada Rowley Moody =

British Liberal Party politician

Rowley Moody in 1923

Ada Rowley Moody JP, née Shufflebotham, was a British Liberal Party politician in Hanley, Staffordshire.

== Background ==
Ada Shufflebotham was born the daughter of John and Emily E. Shufflebotham, of Newcastle-under-Lyme. She was educated at Orme Girls' School, Newcastle-under-Lyme. In 1914 she married Dr. Arthur Rowley Moody of Hanley.

== Political career ==
Ada Rowley Moody was President of Hanley Liberal Association and a member of the Midland Liberal Federation Executive Committee for four years. She was Chairman of the Women's Advisory Committee to the Midland Liberal Federation, 1923 and 1924. She was Liberal candidate for the Hanley division of Staffordshire at the 1923 General Election. She came third and did not stand for parliament again. Her husband was also active in local politics having been proposed as Liberal candidate for Hanley at the 1912 by-election, before withdrawing. She was a Justice of the peace for Stoke-on-Trent. She was Vice-President of North Staffordshire Liberal Federation. She was a member of Hampstead Borough Council.

=== Electoral record ===
General Election 1923: Hanley
Party	Candidate	Votes	%	±%
Labour	Myles Harper Parker	11,508	53.3	+4.5
Unionist	James Andrew Seddon	5,817	26.9	−1.8
Liberal	Ada Rowley Moody	4,268	19.8	−2.7
Majority		5,691	26.4	+6.3
Turnout			63.7	−3.7
Labour hold		Swing	+3.1	
