= R. L. Outhwaite =

British politician (1868–1930)

RL Outhwaite

Robert Leonard Outhwaite (1868 – 6 November 1930), known as R. L. Outhwaite, was a radical British Liberal Party politician, Member of Parliament and leading advocate of land reform.

== Background ==
He was born in Tasmania in 1868. He spent his early life in country pursuits. He was married and had one son. He died on 6 November 1930.

== Political career ==
He contested West Birmingham at the 1906 General Election, against the leading Unionist politician Joseph (Jo) Chamberlain;

General election 1906: Birmingham, West
Party	Candidate	Votes	%	±%
Liberal Unionist	Joseph Chamberlain	7,173	77.4	
Liberal	R. L. Outhwaite	2,094	22.6	
Majority		5,079	54.8	
Turnout		12,483	74.2	
Liberal Unionist hold		Swing		

He then contested the Horsham division of Sussex at the general election in January 1910. He did not contest the general election of December 1910. He was a friend of Josiah Wedgwood, the Liberal MP for Newcastle-under-Lyme. Like Wedgwood, he was a strong advocate of the Single Tax policy that was central to David Lloyd George's future Land Campaign. In 1912, when a by-election vacancy occurred in Hanley, Staffordshire, Wedgwood persuaded Outhwaite to put himself forward to be Liberal candidate. The seat had been Liberal until the MP Enoch Edwards decided to switch allegiance to the Labour Party in 1909. Since then he had held the seat at both 1910 elections under his new label, before dying in 1912. Outhwaite campaigned heavily in support of Lloyd George's Land tax policies, which were very successful in not only regaining the seat for the Liberals, but in reducing the Labour candidate to a poor third place.

1912 Hanley by-election Electorate
Party	Candidate	Votes	%	±%
Liberal	R. L. Outhwaite	6,647	46.4	
Conservative	George Herman Rittner	5,993	41.8	
Labour	Samuel Finney	1,694	11.8	
Majority		654	4.6	
Liberal gain from Labour		Swing		
Turnout				

When First World War broke out in 1914, Outhwaite's pacifist views put him at odds with both his local Liberal association and then with Lloyd George, who took over as prime minister in 1916. Outhwaite sought re-election at Hanley in 1918 but he had to describe himself as an Independent Liberal, because the local Liberal association had replaced him as their candidate. When the Lloyd George-led Coalition government was handing out 'coupons', the official endorsement went to a National Democrat candidate, who gained the seat. Outhwaite finished in a poor third place;

General election 14 December 1918: Hanley Electorate 33,789
Party	Candidate	Votes	%	±%
National Democratic	James Andrew Seddon	8,032	40.4	n/a
Labour	Myles Harper Parker	7,697	38.7	+26.9
Independent Liberal	R. L. Outhwaite	2,703	13.6	−32.8
Liberal	Leonard Lumsden Grimwade	1,459	7.3	−39.1
Majority		335	1.7	n/a
Turnout			58.9	−26.2
National Democratic gain from Liberal		Swing		

After the election, Outhwaite, along with his old friend, Wedgwood, joined the Labour Party, founding the Hanley branch of the Independent Labour Party. He did not stand for parliament again.

In 1917 he published a book, The Land or Revolution. In 1919 he co-founded the Commonwealth League.

In the 1920s, Outhwaite (as "Leonard Outhwaite) was a member of the Bureau of Industrial Research based in New York City.

Parliament of the United Kingdom
Preceded by Enoch Edwards	Member of Parliament for Hanley; 1912–1918	Succeeded by James Seddon
