= Les Sillitoe =

British trade union leader and politician

Leslie Richard Sillitoe (August 1915 – 10 October 1996) was a British trade union leader and politician.

Sillitoe served in the British Army during World War II and took part in the Normandy Landings. After the war, he found work at the Campbell Tile Factory in Stoke on Trent, and joined the National Society of Pottery Workers (NSPW).

Sillitoe was a supporter of the Labour Party, and won election to Stoke-on-Trent City Council, ultimately serving for 36 years. He became a leading proponent for safer and cleaner working conditions in the pottery industry, and in 1966 he won election as assistant general secretary of the NSPW.

At the end of 1974, Alf Dulson retired as general secretary of the union, by then renamed as the Ceramic and Allied Trades Union, and Sillitoe won the election to replace him. He had immediate success by securing a closed shop agreement with the British Pottery Manufacturers' Federation, agreeing how future wage increases would be calculated, and secured an extra two days holiday for workers in the industry. This agreement took the union to its highest ever membership density, with more than 75% of eligible workers joining.

Sillitoe retired from his trade union posts in 1980, and was Lord Mayor of Stoke-on-Trent in 1981/82. He was made a freeman of the city, and in 1976 he was made an Officer of the Order of the British Empire.

Trade union offices
Preceded by Alf Dulson	General Secretary of the Ceramic and Allied Trades Union; 1975–1980	Succeeded by Alf Clowes
Civic offices
Preceded by John Wallis	Lord Mayor of Stoke-on-Trent; 1981–1982	Succeeded by Thomas Brennan
