= Mark Fisher (British politician) =

British politician (1944–2025)

Parliamentary Under-Secretary of State for Arts
- In office 2 May 1997 – 27 July 1998
- Prime Minister: Tony Blair
- Preceded by: Virginia Bottomley
- Succeeded by: Alan Howarth

Member of Parliament for Stoke-on-Trent Central
- In office 9 June 1983 – 12 April 2010
- Preceded by: Robert Cant
- Succeeded by: Tristram Hunt

Personal details
- Born: Mark Nigel Thomas Vaughan Fisher; 29 October 1944 Woking, Surrey, England
- Died: 16 November 2025 (aged 81)
- Party: Labour
- Spouse(s): Ingrid Geach Hunt (m. 1975; div. 1999) Gillian FitzHugh (m. 2010)
- Relations: Sir Nigel Fisher (father)
- Children: 4, including India
- Education: Trinity College, Cambridge
- Occupation: Politician; author; film producer; school principal; screenwriter
- Website: Official website at the Wayback Machine (archived 8 February 2014)

Mark Nigel Thomas Vaughan Fisher (29 October 1944 – 16 November 2025) was a British Labour Party politician. He was the Member of Parliament (MP) for Stoke-on-Trent Central from 1983 to 2010 and Minister for the Arts between 1997 and 1998.

== Early life ==
Mark Fisher was the son of Sir Nigel Fisher (1913–1996), the Conservative MP for first Hitchin and later Surbiton, and Lady Gloria Vaughan, daughter of the 7th Earl of Lisburne. He was the stepson of Ulster Unionist MP Patricia Ford, and the brother-in-law of Conservative MP Sir Michael Grylls and uncle of explorer Bear Grylls.

Following the retirement of Tam Dalyell in 2005, Fisher became the only Labour MP to have been educated at Eton College. He read English literature at Trinity College, Cambridge. After completing his education in 1966, he became a film producer and screenwriter, but in 1975 Fisher became the principal of the Tattenhall Centre of Education in Cheshire, where he remained until his election to Westminster.

Before leaving university, Fisher had numerous low-paying jobs, including: working in a Cyril Lord carpet factory in Northern Ireland, as a waiter, as a kitchen porter, as a caddie on a golf course, insulating roofs, on a travelling fairground and as a folk singer and guitarist.

His film work consisted of writing screenplays for producer Harry Saltzman and two stage plays: in 1974 for the new Arts Council Horseshoe Theatre in Basingstoke and, in 1988, for the Theatre Upstairs, at the Royal Court in London.

== Political career ==
Fisher unsuccessfully contested Leek at the 1979 general election, being defeated by David Knox by 10,571 votes. Fisher was elected as a councillor to the Staffordshire County Council in 1981 and remained a councillor until he stood down in 1985.

He was elected as an MP for Stoke-on-Trent Central at the 1983 general election following the retirement of the sitting Labour MP Robert Cant. Fisher held the seat with a majority of 8,250.

Once in Parliament, Fisher was appointed a member of the Treasury Select committee from 1983 to 1986. He was appointed an Opposition Whip by Leader of the Opposition Neil Kinnock in 1985, before moving to become Shadow Arts Minister the following year (renamed Shadow Minister at the Department of National Heritage from 1993), a post in which he served up to the 1997 general election. Fisher also was opposition spokesman on the Citizen's Charter for a year following the 1992 general election. In 1992, he introduced the "Right to Know Bill", a private member's bill, which, though unsuccessful, became the forerunner of the Freedom of Information Act 2000.

"Tony Blair manages to give the impression that he doesn't like trade unions, local authorities or the Labour party. People have sensed this and they don't like it."

— Mark Fisher in 2000

Following the Labour victory at the 1997 general Election, new prime minister Tony Blair appointed Fisher as the Parliamentary Under-Secretary of State at the Department for Culture, Media and Sport. During his time as Minister of the Arts, he became the first UK Government minister to address a major outdoor rock music festival when he gave a brief speech before a set by the Smashing Pumpkins at the 1997 Glastonbury Festival. He rebelled against the government by voting against the party whip on the Competition Act 1998, and was later sacked in Blair's first cabinet reshuffle in 1998, after which Fisher returned to the backbenches.

He served as the Patron for the National Benevolent Fund for the Aged from 1986, and was a member of the BBC General Advisory Council from 1987 until 1997. He also served as a council member of the Institute for Policy Studies from 1985 until 1995, and was the deputy Pro-Chancellor of Keele University from 1989 until his entry to government in 1997. In 2000, he was a visiting fellow at St Antony's College, Oxford.

In June 2009, Fisher called on Prime Minister Gordon Brown to resign. In the expenses scandal, Fisher claimed more than £17,000, none of which he was required to pay back. The bulk of this sum was spent on mortgage and utility payments on his second home. Some of his more bizarre expenses claims include a 34-pence Kit Kat bar, a bottle of Toilet Duck and a pack of chunky crayons and face-painting kit.

On 10 March 2010, Fisher announced that he would stand down as an MP due to health concerns, citing hydrocephalus. He was succeeded as MP for Stoke-on-Trent Central by Tristram Hunt, who was also educated at Trinity College, Cambridge.

=== Political views ===
On 31 October 2006, Fisher was one of 12 Labour MPs to back Plaid Cymru and the Scottish National Party's call for an inquiry into the Iraq War.

He opposed foundation hospitals and the Trident system, voting against these issues in the House of Commons. He also opposed the 42-day detention without charge policy and the 10p tax.

Fisher believed that Parliament had become too much of a rubber stamp for government policy. He chaired the "Parliament First" group, which seeks to restore the balance of power to Parliament.

His particular interest of the arts led him to criticise the Blair administration for what he called its obsession with "popular music, youth culture and new technologies" and "art created for and by young people"; instead he wished for a more "balanced" cultural policy.

== Personal life and death ==
In 1971, Fisher married Ingrid Geech Hunt, with whom he had two children, Rhydian Fisher and the actress India Fisher, and he also became the stepfather of Hunt's two children by her previous marriage, the musician Crispin Hunt (whose time as frontman of Britpop band Longpigs coincided with Fisher's tenure as Minister of Arts) and the actress Francesca Hunt. The couple divorced in 1999. He lived briefly with Candia McWilliam.

Fisher lived in the Stoke-on-Trent district of Hartshill since first running for Parliament.

Fisher refused the offer of a peerage ahead of the 2001 General Election.

Fisher's 2004 book Britain's Best Museums and Galleries listed what were, in his opinion, the 350 best museums in the country.

In October 2009, it was revealed that Fisher received an annual fee of £67,000 from the Doha-based Qatar Museums Authority for providing "advice on the development of the museums authority's plans" and attending three board meetings a year.

Fisher died on 16 November 2025, at the age of 81.

== Bibliography ==
- 1974: Brave New Town (play)
- 1988: City Centres, City Cultures
- 1990: The Cutting Room (play)
- 1991: Whose Cities? (with Ursula Owen), Penguin Books
- 1992: A New London (with Richard Rogers), Penguin Books; ISBN 0-14-015794-8
- 2004: Britain's Best Museums and Galleries, Allen Lane; ISBN 0-7139-9575-0
