= Enoch Edwards (trade unionist) =

British trade unionist and politician (1852–1912)

Member of Parliament for Hanley
- In office 8 February 1906 – 28 June 1912

Personal details
- Born: 10 April 1852 Talk-o'-the Hill, Staffordshire
- Died: 28 June 1912 (aged 60)
- Party: Labour
- Other political affiliations: Liberal-Labour (UK)

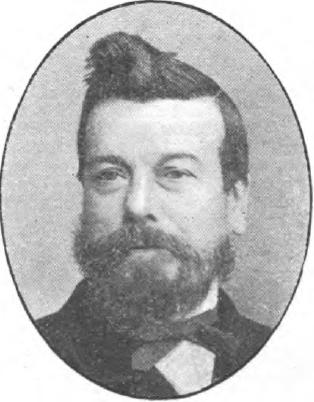
Edwards c.1900

Enoch Edwards (10 April 1852 – 28 June 1912) was a British trade unionist and politician.

== Biography ==
Edwards was born at Talk-o'-the Hill Staffordshire on 10 April 1852. He was the son of a pitman, and worked in a coal-mine as a boy.

In 1870 he became treasurer of the North Staffordshire Miners' Association and was elected secretary to the same body in 1877. In 1880 he became president of the Midland Miners' Association; he was later president of the Miners' Federation of Great Britain in 1904.

In 1884 he went to Burslem, where he became a member of the school board and town council in 1886, and later he became alderman and mayor. He was also a member of the Staffordshire County Council. Edwards was elected to Parliament as the Lib-Lab MP for Hanley in 1906. He moved to Labour Party in 1909 following the direction from his trade union, and was elected as an Labour MP outright 1910, however he maintained support from the local Liberal Party organization during his political career. Edwards died in Southport on 28 June 1912, aged 60.

Parliament of the United Kingdom
Preceded by Arthur Heath	Member of Parliament for Hanley; 1906–1912	Succeeded by R. L. Outhwaite
Trade union offices
Preceded by James Hand	Secretary of the North Staffordshire Miners' Federation; 1877–1912	Succeeded by Samuel Finney
Preceded by New position	Treasurer of the Miners' Federation of Great Britain; 1889–1904	Succeeded by William Abraham
Preceded by New position	President of the Midland Counties Miners' Federation; 1886–1912	Succeeded by Samuel Finney
Preceded by Ben Tillett and Francis Chandler	Trades Union Congress representative to the American Federation of Labour; 1902; With: Matthew Arrandale	Succeeded by William Mullin and James O'Grady
Preceded by Ben Pickard	President of the Miners' Federation of Great Britain; 1904–1912	Succeeded by Robert Smillie
