= Harold Hales =

British businessperson and politician (1868–1942)

Harold Keates Hales (22 April 1868 – 7 November 1942) was a British shipping magnate, politician and founder of the Hales Trophy for the Blue Riband award for the ship with the record for the fastest transatlantic crossing. Known for his eccentricity, he was the inspiration for the title character of Arnold Bennett's The Card. He was the sole proprietor of Hales Brothers, an export and import shipping line.

== Early life and education ==
He was born in Manchester in 1868, to Lewis George Hales, a draper, and Sarah Elizabeth Keates. Hales was educated in Manchester and Burslem, where his schoolmate was Arnold Bennett. Bennett later admitted that Hales was the inspiration for the title character in The Card.

== Career ==
Hales worked in the pottery and china business in the Stoke-on-Trent area, founding "Hales Brothers", an export and import shipping line, of which he was the sole proprietor.

He first owned a car in 1897, and later bragged that he had never blown his horn, and tried to make it illegal for anyone else to blow theirs. In 1904, he drove the first non-stop car from London to Edinburgh. He flew an airship around St. Paul's Cathedral in 1908. In 1910, he was one of the first people to survive an airplane crash.

After serving in Turkey during World War I, he travelled the world promoting British industry.

He was Conservative MP for Hanley from 1931 to 1935. He enlivened a House of Commons debate on the herring industry by gesturing with a dead herring as he argued.

In 1935, he inaugurated the Hales Trophy for the Blue Riband award for the ship with the record for the fastest transatlantic crossing. It was commissioned in 1933 and designed by Charles Holliday, designer for the firm of James Dixon and Sons, silversmiths of Cornish Place Sheffield, working to very specific instructions supplied by Hales. The trophy is almost four feet (1.2 m) tall, almost one hundred pounds (45 kg), made of solid silver, onyx and heavy gilt, showing Victory, Neptune and Amphitrite upholding a globe and topped by a figure called Speed urging a liner into the face of a figure called the Force of the Atlantic. An enameled blue ribbon surrounds the middle of the prize, and there are memorials to past record-holders, with Harold Hales's name at the base.

== Death ==
He died on 7 November 1942 aged 74, accidentally drowning in the River Thames, near Shepperton. His body was recovered on 8 December in Weybridge.

He married Ethel King. Their only son, Ormonde Keates Hales (1915–1979) was a businessman and archaeologist.

== Publications ==
- Harold's Adventures, his autobiography (1926)
- Chariots of the Air (1936)
- The Road to Westminster, and My Impressions of Parliament (1936)
- The Autobiography of 'The Card' (1936)
- Keeling and Son (1938)

Parliament of the United Kingdom
Preceded by Arthur Hollins	Member of Parliament for Hanley; 1931–1935	Succeeded by Arthur Hollins
