= Frederick James Hancock =

British trade union leader

Frederick James Hancock (1 October 1873 – 9 August 1963) was a British trade union leader.

Hancock was born in Talke, Staffordshire. He attended the Butt Lane National School and spent some time studying at Allegheny College in Pennsylvania.

Hancock began working as a coal miner in Staffordshire at age 14, and became active in the North Staffordshire Miners' Association, serving as its financial secretary from 1914. This role brought him greater prominence in the movement, and in 1926 and 1927 he served on the executive of the Miners' Federation of Great Britain. In the early 1930s, Samuel Finney, the general secretary of the North Staffordshire Miners, retired, and Hancock won the election to succeed him. He was also elected to succeed Finney as president of the Midland Miners' Federation, to which the North Staffordshire Miners were affiliated. He frequently attended the Trades Union Congress, and in 1937 was its delegate to the Trades and Labour Congress of Canada.

Hancock retired in 1941. In his spare time, he served as a Methodist lay preacher.

He died in 1963 in Stoke-on-Trent, Staffordshire, aged 89.

Trade union offices
Preceded by Samuel Finney	General Secretary of the North Staffordshire Miners' Association; 1930s–1941	Succeeded by Hugh Leese
Preceded by Samuel Finney	President of the Midland Miners' Federation; 1930s–1941	Succeeded by Arthur Baddeley?
