= Andrew MacLaren =

British politician (1883–1975)

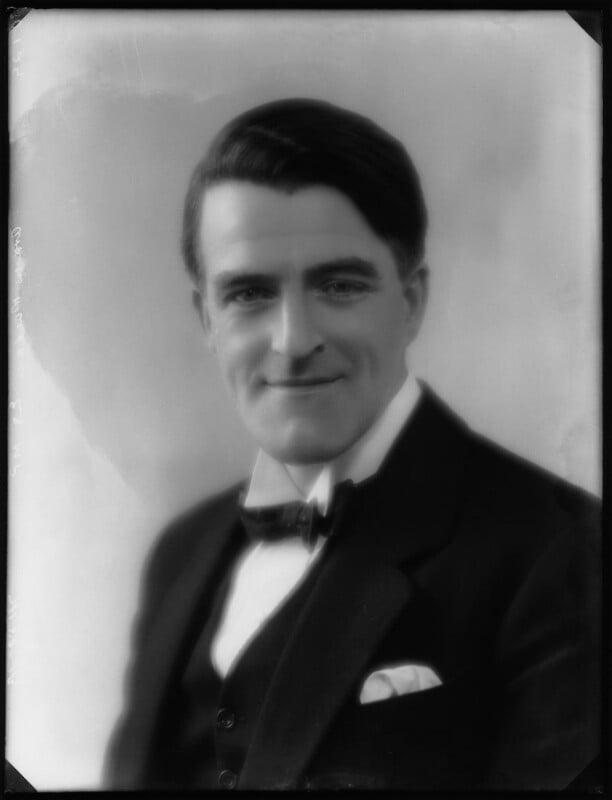
MacLaren in 1929

Andrew MacLaren (28 May 1883 – 11 April 1975) was a British politician who represented Burslem as a Member of Parliament for three separate terms during the 20th century. A member of the Labour Party and Independent Labour Party, his passions were economic justice and art. He persistently campaigned for Land Value Taxation, founding the School of Economic Science (later renamed School of Philosophy and Economic Science) to advocate for the policy. He was also a painter.

== History ==
Andrew MacLaren was born in a poor district of Glasgow. Early influences were Christianity, Mozart, Palestrina, and recent Irish history. An engineering apprentice from age 14 (working alongside John later Lord Reith), he attended art classes in the evening when able. From 17, when his father died, he had to provide for the family.

He looked for the causes of the poverty and deprivation observed around him, hoping to find solutions. He studied Marx extensively, but failed to find answers. However, on discovering Glasgow's single tax movement and reading Henry George’s "Progress and Poverty" (c 1905) he was inspired. From then on, he focused on the one issue that (as he believed) could solve the social and economic problems and hence make men free: Land Value Taxation.

Andrew MacLaren moved to London in 1914 and joined the Labour Party. He was MP for Burslem from 1922 to 1923, 1924 to 1931 and 1935 to 1945. In 1943, he resigned from the Labour Party and finally lost his seat when standing for Independent Labour in the 1945 election. He died in 1975 after a short illness. He had 2 sons, Leon and John.

Whilst an MP he often toured the most deprived parts of the country, raising the awareness of their plight in parliament. Whilst not an MP, he lectured extensively, encouraging and educating wherever he could to further the cause of land reform. Any remaining time was devoted to his art.

Andrew MacLaren is the father of philosopher Leon MacLaren.

== Passions ==
Andrew MacLaren’s political hero was Campbell-Bannerman, and he often repeated CB’s pledge " ... to make the land less of a pleasure ground for the rich, and more of a treasure-house for the nation ...".

He was a vocal supporter of Philip Snowden’s 1931 budget which included a measure of Land Value Taxation which reached the statute books in 1931. With the next election (1931) he lost his seat and then saw the act being repealed. He tried again with a private member's bill in 1937; it was rejected 141 to 118, and so he never saw his dream fulfilled.

He founded the School of Economic Science, to teach courses on economics with a focus on the Land Value Taxation policies of Henry George

He was firmly against the welfare state, believing it merely appeared to be necessary due to the prevailing inequities in the economic system. As he saw it, without reforming land tenure the welfare state would bankrupt the state. This set him in conflict with the Labour leadership.

When not in parliament he poured his effort and talent into education, hoping to make people see how land value taxation could relieve society of many unhelpful economic tendencies, and provide economic freedom for the common people.

Andrew MacLaren was also an artist and cartoonist. One painting (of Neville Chamberlain) is in the National Gallery.

He was knowledgeable on renaissance art and in 1948 was commissioned by National Gallery to write a report on Leonardo da Vinci’s "Madonna of the Rocks".

He corresponded with many well known people of that age; the letters with George Bernard Shaw (on Land Value Taxation) are at the British Library.

== Notes ==
Parliament of the United Kingdom
Preceded by Samuel Finney	Member of Parliament for Burslem; 1922–1923	Succeeded by William Robinson
Preceded by William Robinson	Member of Parliament for Burslem; 1924–1931	Succeeded by William Allen
Preceded by William Allen	Member of Parliament for Burslem; 1935–1945	Succeeded by Albert Davies
