= Arthur Hollins (politician) =

British Labour MP (1876-1962)

Member of the British Parliament for Hanley

Personal details
- Born: 19 September 1876
- Died: 18 December 1962 (aged 86)
- Party: Labour

Arthur Hollins CBE (19 September 1876 – 22 April 1962) was an English trade unionist and Labour politician who was a Member of Parliament for Hanley in Staffordshire, England.

== Early life ==
Hollins was born in Burslem, Staffordshire, the son of son of William and Caroline Hollins. He was educated at St. Paul's Church School and the Wedgwood Institute in Burslem, one of The Potteries that formed the city of Stoke-on-Trent. He was general-secretary of the National Society of Pottery Workers from 1928 to 1947.

== Political Career ==
He was elected as an MP at a by-election in 1928, lost his seat at the 1931 general election, won it back in 1935, and stood down in 1945. Hollins was a local councillor and was Lord Mayor of Stoke-on-Trent for 1933–34, was awarded CBE in 1949, and became a Freeman of the City of Stoke-on-Trent in 1960. He died in 1962.

Parliament of the United Kingdom
Preceded by Samuel Clowes	Member of Parliament for Hanley; 1928 – 1931	Succeeded by Harold Hales
Preceded by Harold Hales	Member of Parliament for Hanley; 1935 – 1945	Succeeded by Barnett Stross
Trade union offices
Preceded by Samuel Clowes	General Secretary of the National Society of Pottery Workers; 1928–1947	Succeeded by Harold Hewitt
