= Burslem (constituency) =

Parliamentary constituency in the United Kingdom, 1918–1950

- Former constituency Unknown parliament UK.

1918–1950
- Seats: One
- Created from: Leek
- Replaced by: Stoke-on-Trent North

Burslem was a borough constituency in Stoke-on-Trent which returned one Member of Parliament (MP) to the House of Commons of the Parliament of the United Kingdom. Elections were held using the first past the post voting system.

== Boundaries ==
The County Borough of Stoke-on-Trent wards numbers one, two, three, four, five, six, seven and eight.

The constituency was created for the 1918 general election, and abolished for the 1950 general election. From 1885 to 1918 the Stoke-on-Trent area had been divided into two constituencies: Stoke and Hanley. In 1918, the area was divided into three constituencies: Stoke, Hanley and a new seat called Burslem. Burslem was thus made up from part of the former Stoke seat and part of Hanley.

== History ==
Until 1918, both Stoke and Hanley had been represented by Liberal MPs. The Liberal Party in the area was heavily influenced by support for radical land reform policies such as Site Value Rating and the Single Tax policy. These policies were advocated by R.L. Outhwaite, the MP for Hanley and Josiah Wedgwood, the MP for neighbouring Newcastle-under-Lyme. After 1918, they both left the Liberal Party and joined the Labour Party. There they influenced Andrew MacLaren. who was for many years the standard-bearer for the Labour Party and an advocate of Site Value Rating. At the 1931 general election, the supporters of land reform were split when MacLaren was opposed by a candidate who advocated a Single Tax policy. He returned to Parliament in 1935, but left the Labour Party in 1943 and sought re-election as an Independent.

When Outhwaite and Wedgwood left the Liberal Party in 1919, those who remained made the Liberal Party less radical. For the next 20 years the Liberal Party and the Unionist Party experimented with different approaches to electoral politics, often coming together to support the same candidate, as in 1922, 1924, 1931 and 1935.

== Members of Parliament ==
Election	Member	Party
1918	Samuel Finney	Labour
1922	Andrew MacLaren	Labour
1923	William Edward Robinson	Liberal
1924	Andrew MacLaren	Labour
1931	William Allen	Liberal National
1935	Andrew MacLaren	Labour
1945	Albert Davies	Labour
1950	constituency abolished	

== Election results ==
=== Elections in the 1910s ===
General election 1918: Burslem
Party		Candidate	Votes	%	±%
	Labour	Samuel Finney	7,474	44.3	
C	Unionist	Sampson Walker	6,301	37.3	
	Liberal	Walter Essex	3,108	18.4	
Majority			1,173	7.0	
Turnout			16,883	56.5	
Registered electors			29,866		
	Labour win (new seat)				
C indicates candidate endorsed by the coalition government.

=== Elections in the 1920s ===
General election 1922: Burslem
Party	Candidate	Votes	%	±%
Labour	Andrew MacLaren	11,872	50.4	+6.1
National Liberal	Sydney Malkin	11,667	49.6	+31.2
Majority		205	0.8	−6.2
Turnout		23,539	78.2	+21.7
Registered electors		30,119		
Labour hold		Swing	N/A	

General election 1923: Burslem
Party	Candidate	Votes	%	±%
Liberal	William Edward Robinson	12,543	50.1	+0.5
Labour	Andrew MacLaren	12,480	49.9	−0.5
Majority		63	0.2	N/A
Turnout		25,023	82.4	+4.2
Registered electors		30,372		
Liberal gain from Labour		Swing	+0.5	

General election 1924: Burslem
Party	Candidate	Votes	%	±%
Labour	Andrew MacLaren	14,361	51.1	+1.2
Constitutionalist	William Allen	13,755	48.9	New
Majority		606	2.2	N/A
Turnout		28,116	88.1	+5.7
Registered electors		31,903		
Labour gain from Liberal		Swing	N/A	

General election 1929: Burslem
Party	Candidate	Votes	%	±%
Labour	Andrew MacLaren	20,228	58.6	+7.5
Unionist	Alfred P. Harrison	7,440	21.6	New
Liberal	James Joy	6,815	19.8	New
Majority		12,788	37.0	+34.8
Turnout		34,483	82.5	−5.6
Registered electors		41,782		
Labour hold		Swing	N/A	

=== Elections in the 1930s ===
General election 1931: Burslem
Party	Candidate	Votes	%	±%
National	William Allen	18,647	52.8	New
Labour	Andrew MacLaren	16,248	46.0	−12.6
Commonwealth Land	Arthur Rowland-Entwhistle	401	1.1	New
Majority		2,399	6.8	N/A
Turnout		35,296	82.5	0.0
National gain from Labour		Swing		

General election 1935: Burslem
Party	Candidate	Votes	%	±%
Labour	Andrew MacLaren	18,030	54.2	+8.4
National Liberal	William Allen	15,227	45.8	−7.0
Majority		2,803	8.4	+1.6
Turnout		33,257	77.9	−4.6
Labour gain from National		Swing	+7.7	

=== Elections in the 1940s ===
General Election 1939–40

Another general election was scheduled to take place before the end of 1940. In 1939 the parties were preparing for an election, and by the end of that year, the following candidates had been selected:

- Labour: Andrew MacLaren

General election 1945: Burslem
Party	Candidate	Votes	%	±%
Labour	Albert Davies	20,044	60.5	+6.3
National Liberal	Frederic Bennett	9,877	29.8	−16.0
Independent Labour	Andrew MacLaren	3,223	9.7	−44.5
Majority		10,167	30.7	+22.3
Turnout		33,144	78.7	+0.8
Registered electors		42,121		
Labour hold		Swing	+11.1	
