= Stoke-on-Trent Central =

Parliamentary constituency in the United Kingdom

Coordinates: 53.01°N 2.16°W

- Borough constituency for the House of Commons
- Boundaries since 2024
- Boundary of Stoke-on-Trent Central in West Midlands region
- County: Staffordshire
- Electorate: 61,774 (December 2010)

Current constituency
- Created: 1950
- Member of Parliament: Gareth Snell (Labour)
- Seats: One
- Created from: Hanley; Stoke

Stoke-on-Trent Central is a constituency in Staffordshire represented in the House of Commons of the UK Parliament since 2024 by Gareth Snell of the Labour Party, who had previously represented the constituency between 2017 and 2019. He succeeded Jo Gideon of the Conservative Party who defeated him in the general election of 2019. Gideon did not seek re-election in 2024, having announced in early 2023 that she would be standing down.

== Constituency profile ==
Hanley viewed from Fenton

Stoke-on-Trent Central is a constituency in Staffordshire in the West Midlands region of England. It covers the central and eastern areas of the city of Stoke-on-Trent, including the towns of Stoke-upon-Trent, Hanley, Fenton and the northern half of Longton, and the residential neighbourhoods of Bucknall, Abbey Hulton and Bentilee.

Stoke-on-Trent is a polycentric city that was formed in 1910 from the amalgamation of six towns. The Stoke-on-Trent area is commonly referred to as the Potteries, reflecting its traditional status as the country's foremost centre for the production of ceramics. Coal mining and steelmaking were also important industries in the city. The deindustrialisation of the late 20th century had a negative economic impact on the city; most of this constituency is highly-deprived today. Residents largely live in dense terraced houses and many properties are socially-rented, especially in Abbey Hulton and Bentilee which were developed in the 1950s as council housing. House prices across the constituency are considerably lower than the rest of the West Midlands and the average price is less than half the UK average.

Stoke-on-Trent Central has a low proportion of retirees and an above-average young adult population; Royal Stoke University Hospital and the University of Staffordshire, which has around 17,000 students, are located here. Residents have low levels of income and homeownership, and the child poverty rate is nearly double the overall UK figure. They have low levels of education and a high proportion work in the health and transport sectors. The percentage of residents claiming unemployment benefits is high. White people made up 81% of the population at the 2021 census. Asians, mostly of Pakistani origin, were the largest ethnic minority group at 11% and were concentrated in Hanley where they made up around one-third of the population.

At the local city council, almost all seats in this constituency are represented by Labour Party councillors. Voters in Stoke-on-Trent Central strongly supported leaving the European Union in the 2016 referendum; an estimated 69% voted in favour of Brexit compared to the UK-wide figure of 52%, making it one of the top 25 most leave-voting constituencies out of 650 nationwide.

== Boundaries ==
=== Historic ===
Context of the 2019 result. The three seats of the city bore the opposite result to the other three-seat cities (such as Coventry, Nottingham, Leicester and Hull)

1950–1955: Wards 10 to 18 and 28 of the county borough of Stoke-on-Trent.

1955–1983: Wards 9 to 16 of the county borough of Stoke-on-Trent.

1983–2010: The Abbey, Berryhill, Brookhouse, Hanley Green, Hartshill, Shelton and Stoke West wards of the City of Stoke-on-Trent.

2010–2024: Abbey Green, Bentilee and Townsend, Berryhill and Hanley East, Hanley West and Shelton, Hartshill and Penkhull, Northwood and Birches Head, and Stoke and Trent Vale in the City of Stoke-on-Trent.

=== Current ===
Under the 2023 Periodic Review of Westminster constituencies which came into effect for the 2024 general election, the constituency was defined as composing the following as they existed on 1 December 2020:

- The City of Stoke-on-Trent wards of: Abbey Hulton and Townsend; Bentilee and Ubberley; Birches Head and Central Forest Park; Boothen and Oak Hill; Eaton Park; Etruria and Hanley; Fenton East; Fenton West and Mount Pleasant; Hanley Park and Shelton; Hartshill and Basford; Joiner's Square; Meir Hay; Penkhull and Stoke; Sandford Hill; Sneyd Green; Springfields and Trent Vale.

In order to bring the electorate within the permitted range, significant parts of the Stoke-on-Trent South constituency were transferred in, including the town of Fenton. In addition, the boundary with Stoke-on-Trent North were re-aligned to take account of changes to ward boundaries.

Following a further local government boundary review in the City of Stoke-on-Trent which came into effect in May 2023, the constituency now comprises the following from the 2024 general election:

- The City of Stoke-on-Trent wards of: Abbey Hulton; Basford & Hartshill; Bentilee, Ubberley & Townsend; Birches Head & Northwood; Boothen; Etruria and Hanley (nearly all); Bucknall & Eaton Park; Fenton East; Fenton West & Mount Pleasant; Hanley Park, Joiner's Square & Shelton; Hartshill Park & Stoke; Meir Hay North, Parkhall & Weston Coney (part); Moorcroft & Sneyd Green (part); Penkhull & Springfields; Sandford Hill; Trent Vale & Oak Hill; and a very small part of Longton & Meir Hay South.

== History ==
The constituency was created for the 1950 general election as the successor to the Hanley Division of Stoke-on-Trent. The large town had first gained representation by way of the "Great Reform Act" in 1832.

=== Political history ===
Statistics are confusing as to the current status of the area, reflecting the great demographic—in particular, economic sector—changes in the constituency. Tristram Hunt's result at the 2015 general election gave the seat the 60th-most marginal majority of the Labour Party's 232 seats, measured by percentage of majority. Labour's continuous tenure of Stoke-on-Trent Central from 1950 to 2019 placed it among the approximately 120 constituencies of the 232 which returned Labour members in 2015—all their predecessor areas included—to have withstood landslides for the Conservative Party during the intervening period (such as the 1983 general election). Stoke-on-Trent Central ranked highest for political apathy at the 2015 election, recording the lowest turnout in the United Kingdom.

Tristram Hunt resigned as an MP in January 2017, and Labour's Gareth Snell won the subsequent by-election, with the then leader of UKIP, Paul Nuttall coming in second place. Snell retained the seat at the general election later that year, but was defeated by Jo Gideon at the 2019 general election, the first time the seat or its predecessor had been represented by the Conservative Party since 1935. Gideon did not contest the 2024 general election and the seat was recaptured by Snell, with Reform UK relegating the Conservatives into third place. Turnout in 2024 dropped to just 48%.

=== Prominent members ===
Barnett Stross was awarded the Order of the White Lion in recognition of his role in the development of relations between the UK and Czechoslovakia, and for his role in the renewal of the substantial village of Lidice; he also led statutory efforts that began specific protection of workers against industrial disease.

Mark Fisher was from 1997 to 1998 the Minister for the Arts at the start of Tony Blair's premiership.

Tristram Hunt was the Shadow Secretary of State for Education in the Labour Party's Shadow Cabinet from October 2013 until September 2015. He resigned as an MP in 2017 to take up the post of Director of the Victoria and Albert Museum.

== Members of Parliament ==
| Election | Member | Party |
|---|---|---|
| 1950 | Barnett Stross | Labour |
| 1966 | Robert Cant | Labour |
| 1983 | Mark Fisher | Labour |
| 2010 | Tristram Hunt | Labour |
| 2017 by-election | Gareth Snell | Labour and Co-operative |
| 2019 | Jo Gideon | Conservative |
| 2024 | Gareth Snell | Labour and Co-operative |

== Elections ==
=== Election graph ===
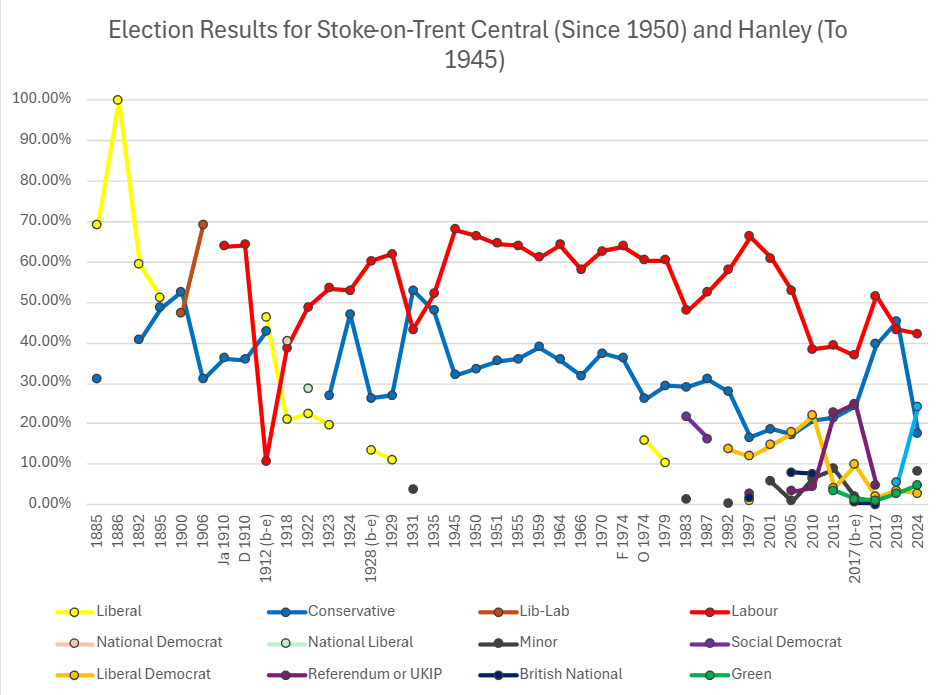
The letters "b-e" represent where a by-election has taken place.

=== Elections in the 2020s ===
General election 2024: Stoke-on-Trent Central
| Party | Candidate | Votes | % | ±% |
|---|---|---|---|---|
| Labour Co-op | Gareth Snell | 14,950 | 42.4 | −0.5 |
| Reform | Luke Shenton | 8,541 | 24.2 | +19.9 |
| Conservative | Chandra Kanneganti | 6,221 | 17.6 | −29.5 |
| Independent | Navid Kaleem | 2,281 | 6.5 | N/A |
| Green | Adam Colclough | 1,703 | 4.8 | +2.8 |
| Liberal Democrats | Laura McCarthy | 999 | 2.8 | −1.0 |
| Independent | Andy Polshaw | 315 | 0.9 | N/A |
| Independent | AliRom Alirom | 279 | 0.8 | N/A |
| Majority | | 6,409 | 18.2 | N/A |
| Turnout | | 35,289 | 48.0 | ▼9.7 |
| Labour gain from Conservative | | Swing | ▲14.5 | |

=== Elections in the 2010s ===
General election 2019: Stoke-on-Trent Central
| Party | Candidate | Votes | % | ±% |
|---|---|---|---|---|
| Conservative | Jo Gideon | 14,557 | 45.4 | ▲5.6 |
| Labour Co-op | Gareth Snell | 13,887 | 43.3 | ▼8.2 |
| Brexit Party | Tariq Mahmood | 1,691 | 5.3 | New |
| Liberal Democrats | Steven Pritchard | 1,116 | 3.5 | ▲1.5 |
| Green | Adam Colclough | 819 | 2.6 | ▲1.5 |
| Majority | | 670 | 2.1 | N/A |
| Turnout | | 32,070 | 57.9 | ▲0.9 |
| Conservative gain from Labour Co-op | | Swing | ▲6.9 | |

General election 2017: Stoke-on-Trent Central
| Party | Candidate | Votes | % | ±% |
|---|---|---|---|---|
| Labour Co-op | Gareth Snell | 17,083 | 51.5 | ▲12.2 |
| Conservative | Daniel Jellyman | 13,186 | 39.8 | ▲17.2 |
| UKIP | Mick Harold | 1,608 | 4.8 | ▼17.9 |
| Liberal Democrats | Peter Andras | 680 | 2.0 | ▼2.2 |
| Green | Adam Colclough | 378 | 1.1 | ▼2.5 |
| Independent | Barbara Fielding | 210 | 0.6 | New |
| Majority | | 3,897 | 11.7 | ▼4.9 |
| Turnout | | 33,145 | 57.0 | ▲7.1 |
| Labour hold | | Swing | ▼2.5 | |

Vote changes are made with reference to the 2015 general election, not to the 2017 by-election.

By-election 2017: Stoke-on-Trent Central
| Party | Candidate | Votes | % | ±% |
|---|---|---|---|---|
| Labour | Gareth Snell | 7,853 | 37.1 | −2.2 |
| UKIP | Paul Nuttall | 5,233 | 24.7 | +2.0 |
| Conservative | Jack Brereton | 5,154 | 24.3 | +1.8 |
| Liberal Democrats | Zulfiqar Ali | 2,083 | 9.8 | +5.6 |
| Green | Adam Colclough | 294 | 1.4 | −2.2 |
| Independent | Barbara Fielding | 137 | 0.6 | New |
| Monster Raving Loony | The Incredible Flying Brick | 127 | 0.6 | New |
| BNP | David Furness | 124 | 0.6 | New |
| CPA | Godfrey Davies | 109 | 0.5 | New |
| Independent | Mohammad Akram | 56 | 0.3 | New |
| Majority | | 2,620 | 12.4 | −4.2 |
| Turnout | | 21,200 | 38.2 | −11.7 |
| Labour hold | | Swing | -2.2 | |

General election 2015: Stoke-on-Trent Central
| Party | Candidate | Votes | % | ±% |
|---|---|---|---|---|
| Labour | Tristram Hunt | 12,220 | 39.3 | +0.5 |
| UKIP | Mick Harold | 7,041 | 22.7 | +18.4 |
| Conservative | Liam Marshall-Ascough | 7,008 | 22.5 | +1.5 |
| Independent | Mark Breeze | 2,120 | 6.8 | New |
| Liberal Democrats | Zulfiqar Ali | 1,296 | 4.2 | −17.5 |
| Green | Jan Zablocki | 1,123 | 3.6 | New |
| CISTA | Ali Majid | 244 | 0.8 | New |
| The Ubuntu Party | Paul Toussaint | 32 | 0.1 | New |
| Majority | | 5,179 | 16.6 | −0.5 |
| Turnout | | 31,084 | 49.9 | −3.3 |
| Labour hold | | Swing | -8.9 | |

General election 2010: Stoke-on-Trent Central
| Party | Candidate | Votes | % | ±% |
|---|---|---|---|---|
| Labour | Tristram Hunt | 12,605 | 38.8 | −13.6 |
| Liberal Democrats | John Redfern | 7,039 | 21.7 | +3.1 |
| Conservative | Norsheen Bhatti | 6,833 | 21.0 | +3.7 |
| BNP | Simon Darby | 2,502 | 7.7 | −0.1 |
| UKIP | Carol Lovatt | 1,402 | 4.3 | +1.1 |
| Independent | Paul Breeze | 959 | 3.0 | New |
| Independent | Gary Elsby | 399 | 1.2 | New |
| City Independents | Brian Ward | 303 | 0.9 | New |
| Independent | Alby Walker | 295 | 0.9 | New |
| TUSC | Matthew Wright | 133 | 0.4 | New |
| Majority | | 5,566 | 17.1 | −12.9 |
| Turnout | | 32,470 | 53.2 | +4.5 |
| Labour win (new seat) | | | | |

=== Elections in the 2000s ===
General election 2005: Stoke-on-Trent Central
| Party | Candidate | Votes | % | ±% |
|---|---|---|---|---|
| Labour | Mark Fisher | 14,760 | 52.9 | −7.8 |
| Liberal Democrats | John Redfern | 4,986 | 17.9 | +3.2 |
| Conservative | Esther Baroudy | 4,823 | 17.3 | −1.5 |
| BNP | Michael Coleman | 2,178 | 7.8 | New |
| UKIP | Joseph Bonfiglio | 914 | 3.3 | New |
| Socialist | Jim Cessford | 246 | 0.9 | New |
| Majority | | 9,774 | 35.0 | −6.9 |
| Turnout | | 27,907 | 48.4 | +1.0 |
| Labour hold | | Swing | -5.5 | |

General election 2001: Stoke-on-Trent Central
| Party | Candidate | Votes | % | ±% |
|---|---|---|---|---|
| Labour | Mark Fisher | 17,170 | 60.7 | −5.5 |
| Conservative | Jill Clark | 5,325 | 18.8 | +2.1 |
| Liberal Democrats | Gavin Webb | 4,148 | 14.7 | +2.8 |
| Independent | Richard Wise | 1,657 | 5.9 | New |
| Majority | | 11,845 | 41.9 | −7.6 |
| Turnout | | 28,300 | 47.4 | −15.4 |
| Labour hold | | Swing | -3.9 | |

=== Elections in the 1990s ===
General election 1997: Stoke-on-Trent Central
| Party | Candidate | Votes | % | ±% |
|---|---|---|---|---|
| Labour | Mark Fisher | 26,662 | 66.2 | +8.2 |
| Conservative | Neil Jones | 6,738 | 16.7 | −11.2 |
| Liberal Democrats | Ed Fordham | 4,809 | 11.9 | −1.7 |
| Referendum | Peter L. Stanyer | 1,071 | 2.7 | New |
| BNP | Michael Coleman | 606 | 1.5 | New |
| Liberal | Fran M. Oborski | 359 | 0.9 | New |
| Majority | | 19,924 | 49.5 | +19.4 |
| Turnout | | 40,245 | 62.8 | −5.3 |
| Labour hold | | Swing | +9.7 | |

General election 1992: Stoke-on-Trent Central
| Party | Candidate | Votes | % | ±% |
|---|---|---|---|---|
| Labour | Mark Fisher | 25,897 | 58.0 | +5.5 |
| Conservative | Nick Gibb | 12,477 | 27.9 | −3.1 |
| Liberal Democrats | Martin Dent | 6,073 | 13.6 | New |
| Natural Law | Nicholas Pullen | 196 | 0.4 | New |
| Majority | | 13,420 | 30.1 | +8.6 |
| Turnout | | 44,643 | 68.1 | −0.7 |
| Labour hold | | Swing | +4.3 | |

=== Elections in the 1980s ===
General election 1987: Stoke-on-Trent Central
| Party | Candidate | Votes | % | ±% |
|---|---|---|---|---|
| Labour | Mark Fisher | 23,842 | 52.5 | +4.4 |
| Conservative | David Stone | 14,072 | 31.0 | +1.6 |
| SDP | Iain Cundy | 7,462 | 16.4 | −5.1 |
| Majority | | 9,770 | 21.5 | +2.8 |
| Turnout | | 45,376 | 68.8 | +2.9 |
| Labour hold | | Swing | +3.1 | |

General election 1983: Stoke-on-Trent Central
| Party | Candidate | Votes | % | ±% |
|---|---|---|---|---|
| Labour | Mark Fisher | 21,194 | 48.1 | −12.1 |
| Conservative | Keith Mans | 12,944 | 29.4 | −0.1 |
| SDP | Vicki Freeman | 9,458 | 21.5 | New |
| Monster Raving Loony | Clive Cook | 504 | 1.1 | New |
| Majority | | 8,250 | 18.7 | −12.0 |
| Turnout | | 44,102 | 65.9 | −3.1 |
| Labour hold | | Swing | −-6.0 | |

=== Elections in the 1970s ===
General election 1979: Stoke-on-Trent Central
| Party | Candidate | Votes | % | ±% |
|---|---|---|---|---|
| Labour | Robert Cant | 24,707 | 60.2 | −0.2 |
| Conservative | Wallace Williams | 12,104 | 29.5 | +5.7 |
| Liberal | Alan Thomas | 4,260 | 10.4 | −5.4 |
| Majority | | 12,603 | 30.7 | −5.9 |
| Turnout | | 41,073 | 69.0 | +3.7 |
| Labour hold | | Swing | -3.0 | |

General election October 1974: Stoke-on-Trent Central
| Party | Candidate | Votes | % | ±% |
|---|---|---|---|---|
| Labour | Robert Cant | 24,146 | 60.4 | −3.4 |
| Conservative | Wallace Williams | 9,493 | 23.8 | −12.4 |
| Liberal | Alan Thomas | 6,313 | 15.8 | New |
| Majority | | 14,653 | 36.6 | +9.0 |
| Turnout | | 39,952 | 65.3 | −5.0 |
| Labour hold | | Swing | +4.6 | |

General election February 1974: Stoke-on-Trent Central
| Party | Candidate | Votes | % | ±% |
|---|---|---|---|---|
| Labour | Robert Cant | 27,171 | 63.8 | +1.2 |
| Conservative | E Ashley | 15,423 | 36.2 | −1.2 |
| Majority | | 11,748 | 27.6 | +2.4 |
| Turnout | | 42,594 | 70.2 | +20.2 |
| Labour hold | | Swing | +1.2 | |

General election 1970: Stoke-on-Trent Central
| Party | Candidate | Votes | % | ±% |
|---|---|---|---|---|
| Labour | Robert Cant | 18,758 | 62.6 | −5.5 |
| Conservative | E Ashley | 11,227 | 37.4 | +5.5 |
| Majority | | 7,531 | 25.2 | −11.0 |
| Turnout | | 29,594 | 50.0 | −18.3 |
| Labour hold | | Swing | -5.5 | |

=== Elections in the 1960s ===
General election 1966: Stoke-on-Trent Central
| Party | Candidate | Votes | % | ±% |
|---|---|---|---|---|
| Labour | Robert Cant | 26,663 | 68.1 | +3.9 |
| Conservative | KG Reeves | 12,515 | 31.9 | −3.9 |
| Majority | | 14,148 | 36.2 | +7.8 |
| Turnout | | 39,178 | 68.3 | −4.0 |
| Labour hold | | Swing | +3.9 | |

General election 1964: Stoke-on-Trent Central
| Party | Candidate | Votes | % | ±% |
|---|---|---|---|---|
| Labour | Barnett Stross | 27,424 | 64.2 | +3.1 |
| Conservative | Julian PH Harrison | 15,322 | 35.8 | −3.1 |
| Majority | | 12,102 | 28.4 | +6.2 |
| Turnout | | 42,746 | 72.3 | −3.0 |
| Labour hold | | Swing | -3.0 | |

=== Elections in the 1950s ===
General election 1959: Stoke-on-Trent Central
| Party | Candidate | Votes | % | ±% |
|---|---|---|---|---|
| Labour | Barnett Stross | 28,630 | 61.1 | −2.8 |
| Conservative | Julian PH Harrison | 18,205 | 38.9 | +2.8 |
| Majority | | 10,425 | 22.2 | −5.4 |
| Turnout | | 46,835 | 75.3 | +4.0 |
| Labour hold | | Swing | -2.7 | |

General election 1955: Stoke-on-Trent Central
| Party | Candidate | Votes | % | ±% |
|---|---|---|---|---|
| Labour | Barnett Stross | 28,452 | 63.9 | −0.7 |
| Conservative | Geoffrey B Price | 16,097 | 36.1 | +0.7 |
| Majority | | 12,355 | 27.8 | −1.5 |
| Turnout | | 44,549 | 71.3 | −10.8 |
| Labour hold | | Swing | -0.7 | |

General election 1951: Stoke-on-Trent Central
| Party | Candidate | Votes | % | ±% |
|---|---|---|---|---|
| Labour | Barnett Stross | 34,260 | 64.6 | −0.9 |
| Conservative | H Ronald Fleck | 18,770 | 35.4 | +0.9 |
| Majority | | 15,490 | 29.2 | −1.8 |
| Turnout | | 53,030 | 82.2 | −1.0 |
| Labour hold | | Swing | -0.9 | |

General election 1950: Stoke-on-Trent Central
| Party | Candidate | Votes | % | ±% |
|---|---|---|---|---|
| Labour | Barnett Stross | 34,908 | 65.5 | |
| Conservative | W Hancock | 18,361 | 34.5 | |
| Majority | | 16,547 | 31.0 | |
| Turnout | | 53,269 | 83.2 | |
| Labour win (new seat) | | | | |

== See also ==
- List of parliamentary constituencies in Staffordshire
- List of parliamentary constituencies in West Midlands (region)
