= James Seddon (British politician) =

British politician

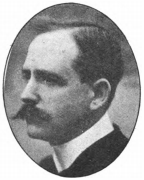
Seddon in the early 1900s.

James Andrew Seddon CH (7 May 1868 – 31 May 1939) was a British trade unionist and politician. Originally a member of the Labour Party, he subsequently moved to the National Democratic and Labour Party.

== Biography ==
Seddon was born in Prescot, Lancashire in 1868. Having served an apprenticeship as a grocer, he spent ten years working as a commercial traveller. He subsequently became the delegate of the St Helens branch of the National Amalgamated Union of Shop Assistants, Warehousemen and Clerks. He was elected as vice-president and then president of the union in 1901 and 1902.

In 1906 he was elected Labour MP for Newton, Lancashire. He held the seat at the subsequent general election in January, 1910, but was defeated by 144 votes in the December 1910 poll. Seddon continued his work with the union movement, was reselected as Labour candidate for Newton and elected a member of the parliamentary committee of the Trades Union Congress in 1911. In 1915 he was elected President of the TUC.

In 1915 Seddon became a founding member of the Socialist National Defence Committee. The SNDC was short-lived, becoming part of the British Workers League in 1916. In 1917 he resigned from the Labour Party, citing a "change of view" caused by the First World War.

In late spring 1918 the British Worker's League resolved to become a parliamentary party. The National Democratic and Labour Party (British Workers League) or NDP was duly formed as a "patriotic working-class party".

At the 1918 general election Seddon successfully contested the Hanley constituency for the NDP, becoming one of the new party's nine MPs. He had the support of the coalition government, and therefore did not face opposition from either the Conservative or Liberal Parties. He was vice-chairman of the party in the Commons from 1918, before becoming chairman in 1920. he was made a Member of the Order of the Companions of Honour in 1918. Seddon's parliamentary career came to an end in 1922: along with the other NDP MPs he lost his seat at the October general election, despite campaigning as a "National Liberal". He later joined the Conservative Party.

General election 1922: Hanley
Party	Candidate	Votes	%	±%
Labour	Myles Parker	10,742	48.8	+10.1
National Liberal	James Seddon	6,312	28.7	−11.7
Liberal	John Howard Whitehouse	4,942	22.5	+15.2
Majority		4,430	20.1	21.8
Turnout			67.4	+8.5
Labour gain from National Democratic		Swing	+10.9	

General election 1923: Hanley
Party	Candidate	Votes	%	±%
Labour	Myles Parker	11,508	53.3	+4.5
Unionist	James Seddon	5,817	26.9	−1.8
Liberal	Ada Rowley Moody	4,268	19.8	−2.7
Majority		5,691	26.4	+6.3
Turnout			63.7	−3.7
Labour hold		Swing	+3.1	

Seddon continued his interest in politics outside of parliament. In 1925 he helped found the Steel House Constructors Union, claiming a programme of building steel houses could employ 150,000 men. He became a member of the Industrial Peace Union of the British Empire formed after the General Strike of 1926.

J. A. Seddon died of a heart attack at his home in New Barnet, Middlesex on 31 May 1939, aged 71.

Parliament of the United Kingdom
Preceded by Richard Pilkington	Member of Parliament for Newton; 1906–1910	Succeeded by Roundell Palmer
Preceded by R. L. Outhwaite	Member of Parliament for Hanley; 1918–1922	Succeeded by Myles Harper Parker
Trade union offices
Preceded by James Crinion and George Henry Roberts	Trades Union Congress representative to the American Federation of Labour; 1912; With: Robert Smillie	Succeeded by Thomas Greenall and Ivor Gwynne
Preceded by William John Davis	President of the Trades Union Congress; 1915	Succeeded by Harry Gosling
