= William Herbert Kemp =

Herbert Kemp

William Herbert Kemp (April 1881 – 17 January 1957) was a British chemist and a Liberal Party politician who was Lord Mayor of Stoke-on-Trent.

== Background ==
Kemp was born in Market Harborough, Leicestershire in April 1881. He was educated at Market Harborough Grammar School and Caterham College in Surrey. In 1911 he married Emma Johnson of Hanley, Staffordshire. They had one daughter, Ruth Vincent Kemp.

== Professional career ==
Kemp was a chemist who first went into business in Stoke-on-Trent, Staffordshire in 1910 where he remained until retirement. He was the first Chairman of the Stoke-on-Trent branch of the Pharmaceutical Society and the last President of the North Staffordshire Chemists Association.

== Political career ==
In 1921 Kemp was elected to Stoke-on-Trent City Council. In 1927 he was appointed a Justice of the Peace. In 1939 he was appointed an Alderman of the Council. From 1944-45 he served as the Lord Mayor of Stoke-on-Trent. He was Chairman of the Juvenile Panel of the City. His wife was Deputy Organiser of Stoke Women's Voluntary Service. He was Chairman of North Staffordshire Liberal Federation. He took a particular interest in education in the North Staffordshire area and in 1949 was one of the founders of Keele University. He was Liberal candidate for the new Stoke-on-Trent South division of Staffordshire at the 1950 General Election.

General Election 1950: Stoke-on-Trent South
Party	Candidate	Votes	%	±%
Labour	Ellis Smith	34,339	64.4	
Conservative	L Orridge	14,637	27.5	
Liberal	William Herbert Kemp	4,307	8.1	
Majority		19,702	37.0	
Turnout			85.3	
Labour win				

He did not stand for parliament again.
