= Samuel Clowes (Labour politician) =

Samuel Clowes (17 September 1864 – 25 March 1928) was an English Labour Party politician who sat in the House of Commons from 1924 to 1928.

Born in Milton, Staffordshire, Clowes was secretary of the National Society of Pottery Workers from 1916. He also served as president of the National Council of the Pottery Industry.

Clowes was a supporter of the Labour Party, and served on Stoke-on-Trent City Council. He was elected as the member of parliament (MP) for the Hanley division of Stoke-on-Trent at the 1924 general election. He held the seat for four years, until his death in 1928, aged 63.

Parliament of the United Kingdom
Preceded by Myles Harper Parker	Member of Parliament for Hanley; 1924 – 1928	Succeeded by Arthur Hollins
Trade union offices
Preceded by Joseph Lovatt	General Secretary of the National Society of Pottery Workers; 1918–1928	Succeeded by Arthur Hollins
