= Robert Cant =

British politician

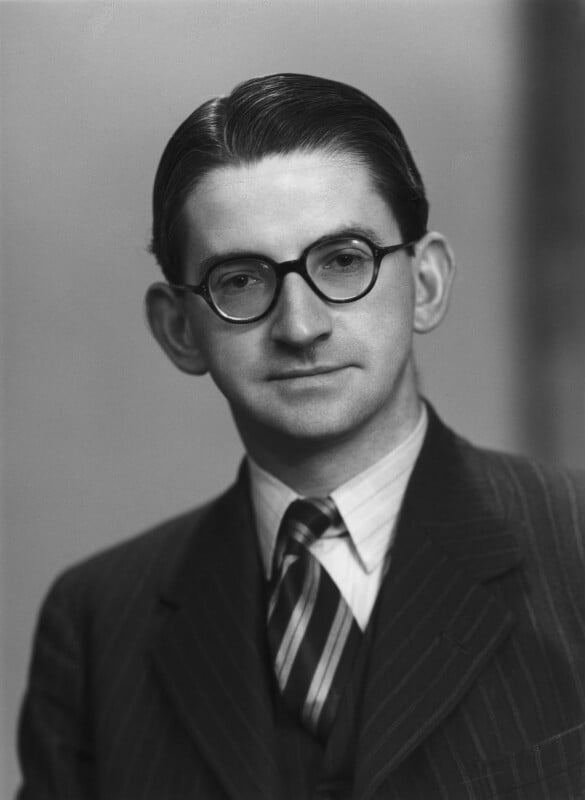
- Cant in 1949

Member of Parliament for Stoke-on-Trent Central
- In office 31 March 1966 – 8 June 1983
- Preceded by: Sir Barnett Stross
- Succeeded by: Mark Fisher

Personal details
- Born: Robert Bowen Cant; 24 July 1915
- Died: 13 July 1997 (aged 81)
- Party: Labour
- Education: London School of Economics
- Occupation: Councillor, politician, university lecturer

Military service
- Allegiance: United Kingdom
- Branch/service: Army- Royal Corps of Signals

Robert Bowen Cant (24 July 1915 – 13 July 1997) was a British Labour politician.

== Early life and career ==
Cant was educated at Middlesbrough High School for Boys and the London School of Economics, where he was awarded a BSc in economics. During the Second World War he served with the Royal Corps of Signals. He became a lecturer in economics at the newly-established University of Keele in 1962, and wrote American Journey, a study of American high schools.

== Political career ==
Cant was elected a councillor on Stoke-on-Trent City Council in 1953, remaining in situ until standing down in 1976. He also served on Staffordshire County Council from 1973 to 1993, representing Chell ward.

He contested Shrewsbury in 1950 and 1951. He was Member of Parliament for Stoke-on-Trent Central from 1966 to 1983, preceding Mark Fisher. Even after leaving the Commons, Cant continued to hold onto his seat on Staffordshire County Council, and until 1989 he was chairman of the Council's Education Committee.
