= Harold Hewitt (trade unionist) =

British and politician (1899–1968)

Harold Hewitt OBE (12 April 1899 – 15 November 1968) was a British trade unionist and politician.

Born in Stoke-on-Trent, Hewitt entered the pottery industry and joined the National Society of Pottery Workers (NSPW) when he was 15. He later moved to work in Scotland, remaining with the NSPW, where he became branch secretary, then district secretary and eventually full-time district organiser and a member of the executive council.

In 1947, Hewitt was elected as the general secretary of the NSPW, relocating back to Stoke. He also served as a Labour Party member of Stoke-on-Trent City Council, as a magistrate, on the Midland Regional Board for Industry and the board of the North Staffordshire University College.

The NSPW offered lower membership rates to women, but also paid lower benefits to them. Hewitt justified this, claiming that women in the industry did "not have the same responsibilities" as men.

Hewitt was elected to the General Council of the Trades Union Congress in 1952, and that year was also made an Officer of the Order of the British Empire. He retired in 1964, and died four years later.

Trade union offices
Preceded by Arthur Hollins	General Secretary of the National Society of Pottery Workers; 1947–1964	Succeeded by Alf Dulson
Preceded by Alan Birch	Food, Drink, etc. Group Member of the General Council of the Trades Union Congress; 1952–1964; With: Alan Birch (1952–1961); Alf Allen (1962–1964)	Succeeded by Alf Allen and Ernest Haynes
