= North Staffordshire Miners' Federation =

- Founded: 1869
- Location: England
- Members: 16,709 (1910)
- Parent organization: Midland Miners' Federation

The North Staffordshire Miners' Federation was a trade union representing miners in the area of Stoke-on-Trent, located in Staffordshire, in England.

The union was established in 1869 as an affiliate of the Miners' National Association (MNA). The association sent William Brown, an experience organiser, to become the union's first agent and secretary. Brown was highly successful at recruitment, raising membership to more than 12,000 by 1871. The union also affiliated to the more radical Amalgamated Association of Miners, although Brown personally favoured avoiding industrial disputes.

By 1874, the price of coal had fallen, along with miners' wages, and union membership. Brown faced criticism for not taking a cut in his own wages. Some lodges left the union, but Brown kept the majority together, reorientating it back towards the MNA.

In 1886, the union was a founder constituent of the Midland Counties Miners' Federation, and through this became an affiliate of the Miners' Federation of Great Britain (MFGB). Membership reached a peak of 16,709 in 1907, then gradually fell. In 1945, the union became the North Staffordshire District of Midland Area of the National Union of Mineworkers, with far less autonomy than before.

== General Secretaries ==
1869: William Brown
1874: James Hand
1877: Enoch Edwards
1912: Samuel Finney
1930s: Frederick James Hancock
1941: Hugh Leese
