= Florence Farmer =

Pioneer of women in politics in Stoke on Trent

Alderman Florence Farmer JP
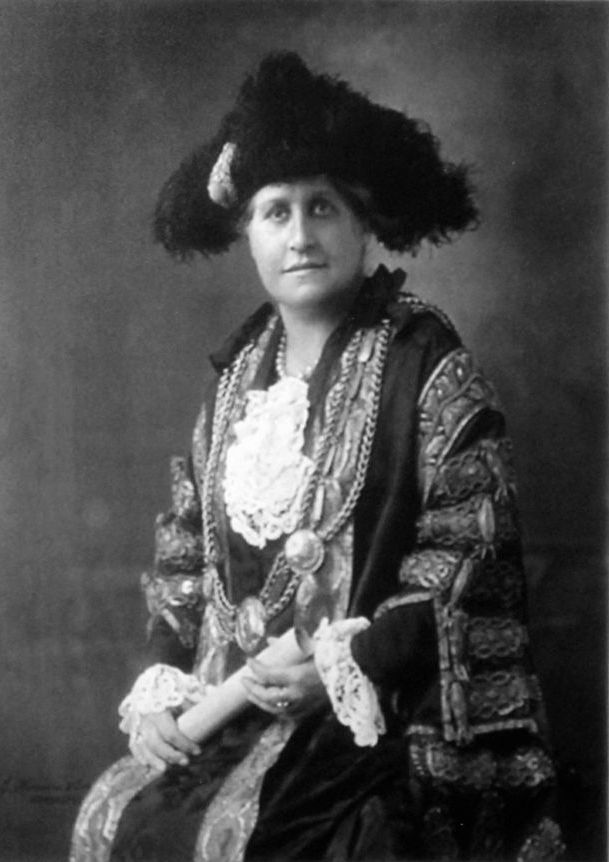
- Florence Farmer in her mayoral regalia, 1931
- Born: 24 January 1873; Longton, Staffordshire, England
- Died: 26 June 1958 (aged 85)
- Occupations: Teacher, businesswoman, politician
- Years active: 1915–1945
- Known for: First female Lord Mayor of Stoke on Trent

Florence Ann Farmer (24 January 1873 – 26 June 1958) was a pioneer of women in politics in Stoke on Trent, Staffordshire, England who was the first female councillor on the county borough council before becoming the first female Lord Mayor of the city in 1931–32.

== Family ==
Farmer was one of the children of George and Mary Farmer and was born in Longton, Staffordshire. Her father George was an active Liberal local politician who was secretary of the local party, a Justice of the Peace and was mayor of Longton in 1895–96.

== Career ==
After leaving school Farmer trained to be a teacher and between 1895 and 1906 was headmistress of Uttoxeter Road Girls School in Longton. She resigned from teaching to set up the Phoenix Steam Laundry company with one of her brothers, George, and after his death in 1917, she continued the partnership with his widow, Maude. This partnership lasted until 1927 when Maude retired leaving Florence in charge of the company. Farmer was one of the founding members of the National Federation of Launderers, becoming the first women to sit on the organisation's national executive committee.

== Political career ==
Women had only been able to be elected as members of the local board of guardians since the passing of the Local Government Act 1894 and it was not until 1907 that women could be elected onto borough council when the Qualification of Women (County and Borough Councils) Act 1907 came into force. Farmer initially followed her father's politics and was a member of the Liberal party but was increasingly drawn to socialism and joined the Labour party after the end of the First World War. In 1915 Farmer was elected to the County Borough of Stoke on Trent board of guardians. Four years later in the November 1919 local election she became the first women to be elected to the County Borough of Stoke on Trent Council when she was returned unopposed for No. 23 ward (Longton).

One of the various committees that Farmer was appointed to was the watch committee and at one of her first meetings she proposed that Stoke-on-Trent City Police should appoint women constables, at first the proposal was defeated, but the proposal was later accepted and the first women constables in Stoke were appointed in 1921.

Appointed as a Justice of the Peace in 1920, Farmer became the first women to be made an Alderman of the now City of Stoke-on-Trent in 1928.

Farmer was chairman of the local branch of the Labour Party between 1929 and 1931. When Lady Cynthia Mosley the MP for Stoke-on-Trent resigned from the party in 1931 to join her husband's, Oswald Mosley, newly-formed New Party, Farmer was nominated as the Labour candidate. She was not selected and the nomination went to Ellis Smith.

Later the same year, in October 1931 Farmer was unanimously chosen to be Lord Mayor of Stoke-on-Trent for the year 1932–33 becoming the first women to be Lord Mayor of the city, and only the fourth women to serve as a Lord Mayor anywhere in England. At her investiture in November 1931 she wore the same mayoral chains that her father had worn as mayor of Longton in 1895.

Farmer continued to serve on the city council until 1945 and was made given Freedom of the City in 1946.

== Personal life ==
Farmer never married and died in June 1958 aged 85.
