= 1928 Hanley by-election =

UK parliamentary by-election

The 1928 Hanley by-election was held on 23 April 1928. The by-election was held due to the death of the incumbent Labour MP, Samuel Clowes. It was won by the Labour candidate Arthur Hollins.

== Candidates ==
The Liberal Party candidate was Walter Meakin, a 52-year-old Stafford man. Meakin was born in 1876 and educated at Trinity College, Cambridge and the London School of Economics. He qualified as a Barrister-at-law but did not practise. From 1915-19 he served in France with the 5th North Staffordshire Regiment. He then served as a Justice of the Peace. Meakin had stood for parliament before, at five general elections: December 1910 at West Staffordshire, 1918 at Stafford, 1922 at Birmingham King's Norton and 1923 and 1924 at Stone. In 1923, he had finished second, just 314 votes behind the Conservative. He had been re-selected to contest Stone for a third time at the next general election, but was drafted for the Hanley by-election.

== Result ==
Hanley by-election, 1928
Party	Candidate	Votes	%	±%
Labour	Arthur Hollins	15,136	60.2	+7.2
Unionist	Alfred Denville	6,604	26.3	−20.7
Liberal	Walter Meakin	3,390	13.5	New
Majority		8,532	33.9	+27.9
Turnout		25,130	69.9	−3.6
Labour hold		Swing	+14.0	

== Aftermath ==
Following the by-election Walter Meakin returned to contest Stone at the 1929 and 1931 general elections, before contesting Loughborough at the 1935 general election, each time without success.
