= J. W. Graham Peace =

British politician (1870–1946)

James William Graham Peace (1870–1946) was one of the founders of the Commonwealth Land Party (UK) and an important figure in the Georgist Movement.

His main work was The Great Robbery (1933), but he also wrote a range of pamphlets and articles.
