= William Allen (National Liberal politician) =

English politician

- Allen in 1895
- Born: 1870
- Died: 11 September 1945 (aged 74–75)
- Occupations: Politician, barrister
- Political party: Liberal Party

William Allen (1870 – 11 September 1945) was a politician in Britain who served as a Member of Parliament (MP) from 1892 to 1900, and – after a gap of more than thirty years – from 1931 to 1935.

Allen was the son of William Shepherd Allen, also an MP. He first entered the House of Commons at the 1892 general election. Aged only 22, he was elected as the Liberal Party MP for Newcastle-under-Lyme, defeating the incumbent Liberal Unionist MP, Douglas Coghill. He was re-elected at the 1895 election, but was defeated at the 1900 general election. This was on account of his active service in the Second Boer War.

He did not seek election again until the 1924 general election, when he stood as a Constitutionalist candidate in the Burslem constituency. In 1924, Constitutionalist candidates were either Unionist or Liberal candidates who were supported by both local party associations. As a group, they wished to see the return of a Coalition Government. Allen narrowly lost the two-way contest to his Labour Party opponent Andrew MacLaren.

Allen did not stand in 1929, but when he stood as a Constitutionalist/National candidate at the 1931 general election he won the seat from MacLaren. After the election Allen took the Liberal National whip in the House of Commons. MacLaren regained the seat, defeating Allen at the 1935 general election. Allen did not stand again.

He lived at the Allen family home, Woodhead Hall, in Cheadle.

Parliament of the United Kingdom
Preceded by Douglas Coghill	Member of Parliament for Newcastle-under-Lyme; 1892–1900	Succeeded by Sir Alfred Haslam
Preceded by Andrew MacLaren	Member of Parliament for Burslem; 1931–1935	Succeeded by Andrew MacLaren
