= Duncan Tanner =

Welsh political historian and academic

Duncan Tanner (19 February 1958 – 11 February 2010) was a political historian and academic. His best-known work covered the British Labour Party and voting in the early 20th century. He held the post of director of the Welsh Institute for Social and Cultural Affairs at Bangor University.

== Selected bibliography ==
- Political Change and the Labour Party 1900-1918 (1990)
- Labour's First Century (2000)
- Debating nationhood and governance in Britain, 1885-1945 (2006)
- The Strange Survival of Liberal England (2007)
