= Samuel Finney (politician) =

British politician

Samuel Finney (1857 – 14 April 1935) was a Labour Party politician in the United Kingdom.

== Life and career ==
Born at Talk-o'-th'-Hill, Finney began working when he was ten years old, and later became a coal miner. In 1881, he was appointed as checkweighman, and he also became active in the North Staffordshire Miners' Federation, serving as its president from 1888 to 1912, and then as its full-time secretary and agent.

Finney was a supporter of the Labour Party, and was elected to Burslem Town Council in 1903, and then to Stoke-on-Trent County Borough Council from its establishment.

Finney first stood for parliament defending a Labour seat at Hanley in 1912, but came third, losing the seat to the Liberal candidate.

1912 Hanley by-election
Party	Candidate	Votes	%	±%
Liberal	R. L. Outhwaite	6,647	46.4	
Conservative	George Herman Rittner	5,993	41.8	
Labour	Samuel Finney	1,694	11.8	
Majority		654	4.6	
Liberal gain from Labour		Swing		
Turnout				

He was elected as Member of Parliament (MP) for North West Staffordshire at a by-election in 1916, following the death of Labour MP Albert Stanley.

When that constituency was abolished at the 1918 general election, he was returned to Parliament for the new Burslem constituency. He did not contest the 1922 general election, when Andrew MacLaren held the seat for the Labour Party. He had four daughters: the son of the eldest went on to become Baron Phillips of Ellesmere, David Chilton Phillips; the youngest son of the youngest daughter is Stephen R. L. Clark.

Parliament of the United Kingdom
Preceded by Albert Stanley	Member of Parliament for North West Staffordshire; 1916–1918	Constituency abolished
New constituency	Member of Parliament for Burslem; 1918–1922	Succeeded by Andrew MacLaren
Trade union offices
Preceded by Enoch Edwards	Secretary of the North Staffordshire Miners' Federation; 1912–1930s	Succeeded by F. J. Hancock
Preceded by Enoch Edwards	President of the Midland Miners' Federation; 1912–1930s	Succeeded by F. J. Hancock
Preceded by Margaret Bondfield and Frederick Hall	Trades Union Congress representative to the American Federation of Labour; 1919; With: Margaret Bondfield	Succeeded by Jack Jones and J. W. Ogden
