= Commonwealth Land Party (UK) =

United Kingdom political party

CLP logo, ca. 1923

The Commonwealth Land Party was a Stoke based political party in the United Kingdom. It was founded in 1919 by J. W. Graham Peace and R. L. Outhwaite as the Commonwealth League, and was initially associated with the Independent Labour Party. It campaigned for the redistribution of land and the abolition of all taxation other than land rent.

Outhwaite was a former Liberal Member of Parliament who had sat for Hanley from 1912 to 1918 and a passionate advocate of the single tax policy. He had some success in persuading Liberal Chancellor of the Exchequer, David Lloyd George to adopt aspects of his views into the Liberal Party Land Campaign. However, land reform took a back seat at the outbreak of World War One.

The group renamed itself the "Commonwealth Land Party" in 1923. It had two candidates run in the 1931 general election, Arthur Rowland-Entwhistle at Burslem and Graham Peace himself at Hanley. Peace died in 1947, after which it was again renamed, as the Common Land Party. It was ultimately disbanded in 1954.

== Results at the 1931 UK general election ==
Constituency	Candidate	Votes	Percentage	Position
Burslem	Arthur Rowland-Entwhitle	401	1.1	3
Hanley	J. W. Graham Peace	946	2.7	3
