= Harper Parker =

English politician (1864–1929)

Myles Harper Parker (1864 – 14 Jan 1929) was an English Labour Party politician who sat in the House of Commons from 1922 to 1924.

Parker began working as a miner while still a child. When he turned fifteen, he found work tending the boilers at The Racecourse Colliery. Three years later, he became a winding engineman, working at the Etruria Hall Collieries and then elsewhere for the Shelton Company.

Parker first joined a union in 1885, and soon became lodge secretary and, later, president. In 1900, his union became part of the National Amalgamated Enginemen, Cranemen, Hammer, Steam and Electric Tram Drivers and Boiler Firemen, and he served as a district secretary. He became increasingly prominent in the union through his effective negotiating skills, and in 1901 he worked with the union's secretary, G. H. Copley, to resolve a regional dispute over wages just before strike action was taken. He was asked to become the union's full-time regional agent in 1902, but turned the post down as he wished to remain in his trade; but when he was again offered the post in 1907, he accepted it, as he had become concerned that his prominence in union matters might reduce his work opportunities. He served as the union's agent for the English Midlands and South Wales until 1922.

Parker was elected as the member of parliament (MP) for the Hanley division of Stoke-on-Trent at the 1922 general election, defeating the sitting Coalition MP James Andrew Seddon. He was re-elected in 1923, but did not contest the 1924 general election.

Parliament of the United Kingdom
Preceded by James Andrew Seddon	Member of Parliament for Hanley; 1922 – 1924	Succeeded by Samuel Clowes
