= Hingley =

Hingley is a surname. Notable people with the surname include:

- Anna Hingley (born 1982), Australian adventurer
- Benjamin Hingley (1830–1905), English ironmaster and Liberal politician
- George Benjamin Hingley (1850–1918), English industrialist
- Noah Hingley (1796–1877), English industrialist
- Robert "Bucket" Hingley, British musician
- Ronald Hingley (1920–2010), English scholar, translator and historian
- Tom Hingley (born 1965), British musician

== See also ==
- Hingley baronets, British Baronetage
