= Edgar Hart =

Edgar Hart may refer to:

- Edgar Hart, founder of Cleansing Service Group
- Edgar Hart, character in 3 Women
- Edgar Hart of the Hart baronets

== See also ==
- Hart (surname)
