= Earls High School =

Academy in London, West Midlands, England

The Earls High School

Location
- Furnace Lane; Halesowen, West Midlands, B63 3SL; England; 52.4527°N 2.0512°W

Information
- Type: Academy
- Motto: Latin: Ut Filii Lucis Fiatis (That We Shall Become Sons of Light)
- Established: 1652 AD
- Local authority: Dudley
- Specialist: Arts College, Language College and Leading Edge College
- Department for Education URN: 137812 Tables
- Ofsted: Reports
- Gender: Co-educational
- Age: 11 to 16
- Enrolment: 1,200
- Houses: Cobham, Abbey, Hingley, Shenstone
- Colours: Royal Blue, Gold and Silver
- Website: earlshighschool.org

The Earls High School is a secondary school with academy status on Furnace Lane near the A458 in Halesowen, West Midlands. Established in 1652 and formerly Halesowen Grammar School, it also incorporates the former Halesowen Technical School.

== Information ==
The school's history dates back to 1652 when a Free Grammar School was founded. There is, however, evidence that a school existed in 1632 as local men are recorded as being benefactors of a Free School in Halesowen. It is unclear whether the Free Grammar School was a new establishment or a new name for an older school.

The original decree stated that these lands and properties should.... hereafter be governed, ordered and employed towards the maintenance and erecting of a Free School within the said town of Hales-Owen and of a Schoolmaster to reach and instruct within the said School the children of the inhabitants of the said town and parish of Hales-Owen to read English Grammar and other Literature.... This is significant as the free school was one of the earliest grammar, as distinct from elementary or petty schools, to have been founded for instruction in English. Most grammar school instruction of the time was in Latin, Greek and Hebrew to facilitate knowledge and learning of Ancient History, Classical Literature and the Scriptures.

Earls High School was created in September 1972 as a result of a re-organisation of education in Halesowen which saw the grammar school merge with the adjacent technical school on Furnace Lane. It was formed at a time when Halesowen was replacing the traditional 5−7 infant, 7−11 junior and 11−16/18 secondary schools with 5−9 first, 9−13 middle and 13−18 secondary schools. Earls High School began life as a 13−18 secondary school with facilities spread between the old grammar and technical school buildings. The technical school being merged with the grammar school in 1966.

The school's facilities have been updated over the years with extensions and new teaching blocks added, along with sports halls and a dance centre, astro turf pitches and a new cricket pavilion.

Earls High School's name is derived from the area of woodland on the steep-sided valley of the River Stour which the school overlooks to the east called 'The Earls'. This land was given to the school in 1926 by Mr. T. F. Grove.

The original building present at the time of the school's foundation in 1652 was demolished in 1864 and replaced by a new building on the same site fronting Grammar School Lane. This building was positioned approximately in the centre of what is now the Earls' traffic roundabout.

A further school building (now the oldest building still in existence) was opened on Friday 1 March 1908. The former school hall within this building (now housing the current library) has fine stained glass windows donated by Sir George Hingley in memory of his uncle Sir Benjamin Hingley who was educated at the school.

The current main school building (known as 'A' Block) was opened in 1931. The architect, Mr A. T. Butler F.R.I.B.A. was educated at the school.

The school has a successful house system believed to have been introduced by Mr. R. Dickinson (Headmaster) in around 1910. The names of the houses (Cobham, Abbey, Shenstone and Hingley) all have connections with Halesowen.

The school motto – Ut Filii Lucis Fiatis ("That We Shall Become Sons of Light") is likely to have been introduced prior to 1905, the date when girls were first admitted to the school.

In September 1982, the Halesowen area (which had become part of the Dudley borough in April 1974) abandoned the three-tier education system and Earls High became an 11-16 school, gaining two younger year groups of 11- and 12-year-olds (first and second years) but its sixth form was closed following the establishment of an expanded tertiary college of further education at nearby Halesowen College. In September 1990, the traditional 1-5 year numbers were replaced with a continuous year numbering system which saw the year groups designated as 7, 8, 9, 10 and 11.

The school is among the highest performing in the whole Dudley borough, with the percentage of pupils gaining 5 or more GCSEs at grade C or above regularly passing the 60% mark.

A sixth form centre was added in September 2009, at the same time as a similar unit was opened at nearby Windsor High School, as sixth form education made a return to Halesowen secondary schools after an absence of almost 30 years.

On Thursday 3 November 2011, the school was forced to temporarily close due to a school building (containing the school's phone lines) being hit by lightning. This resulted in an explosion and reported injuries. The lightning first hit the second oldest existing block 'B' block (the former technical college), in part destroying part of the old bell tower above the main entrance. The direct hit caused timber and roof tiles to fall to the ground, one injuring a year 9 pupil. The lightning also struck the gymnasium to the rear of 'B' block causing activities to halt and/or be postponed. The lightning then struck the 'astroturf' artificial sports pitch to the front of 'A' Block near a group of year 8 pupils. The school emergency response was then implemented and everyone was ushered inside. The lightning then hit 'A' block and its car park, 'L' block (a language block adjacent to 'B' Block) shattering the windows. 'E' block, (the English block) and 'C' block (the art and music block), both adjacent to the tennis courts, were also struck.

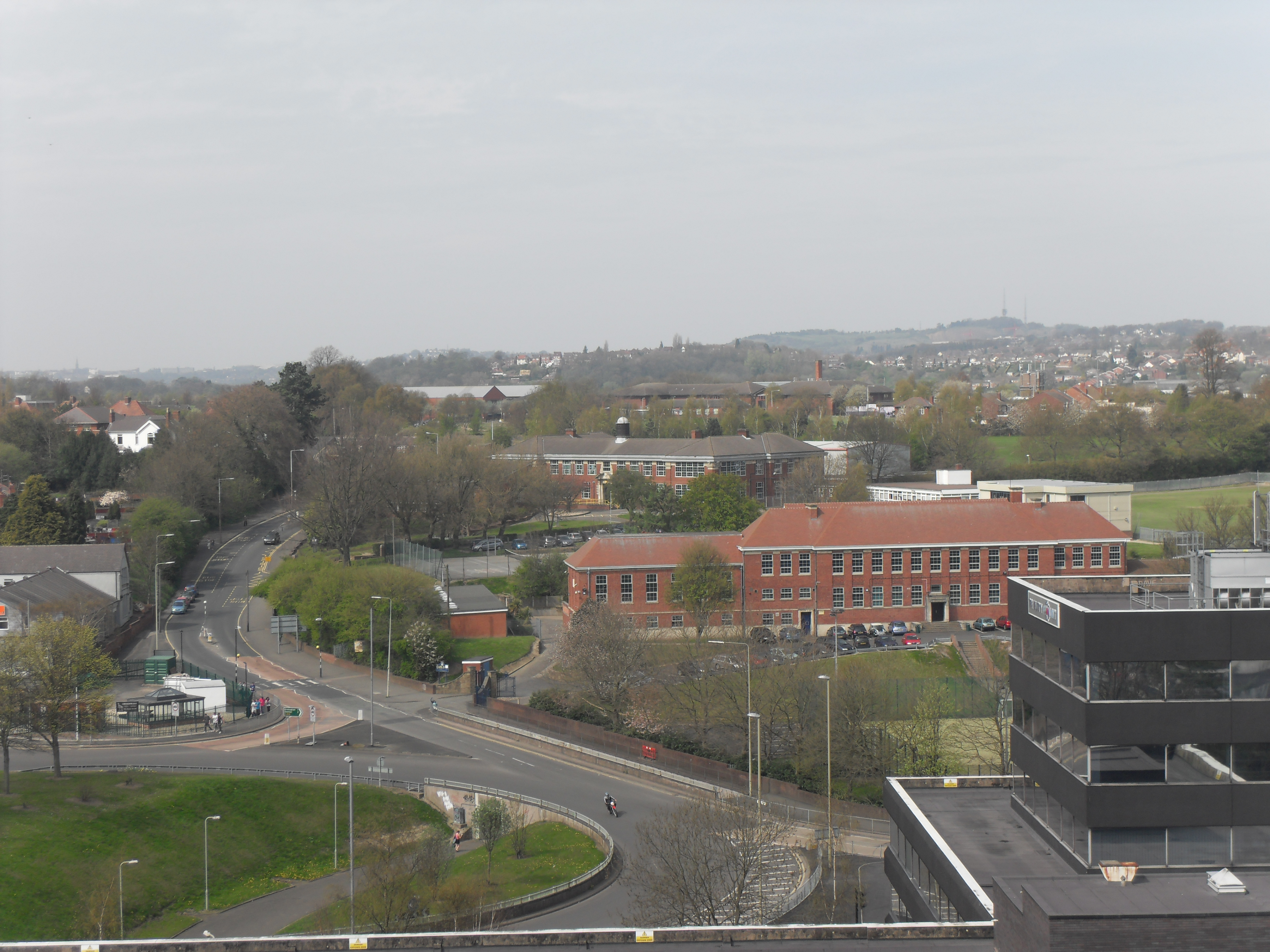
Earls High School from the tower of St John the Baptist Church, Halesowen's 1,000-year-old, Grade I Listed Church

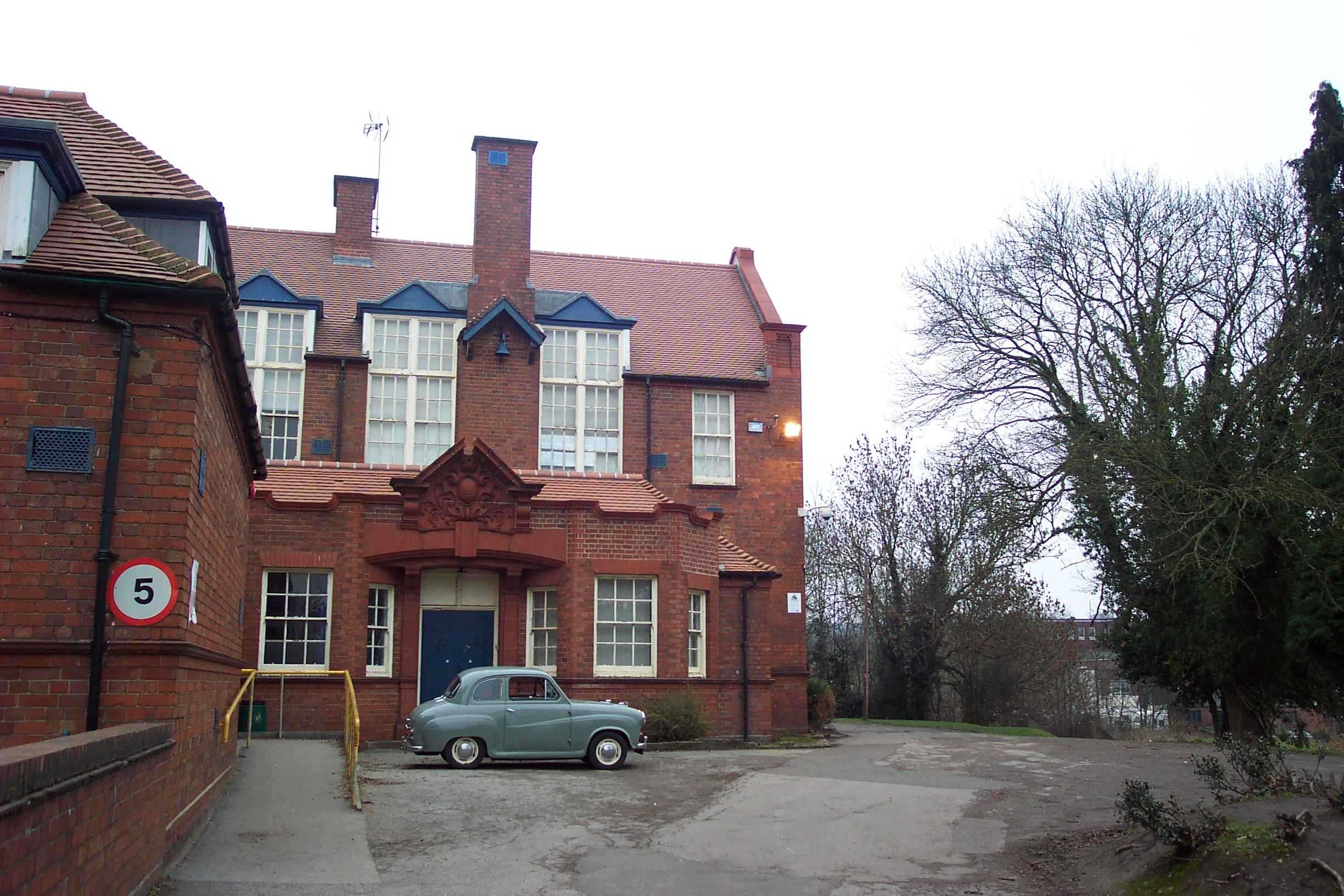
The 1908 block of Earls High School

== Notable alumni ==
Alumni are known as Old Halesonians. The school has long been seen as a strong academic institution and sportingly good at rugby union - the old boys' team eventually being formed in 1930 and becoming the Halesowen Old Halesonians RFC team, supplying their name.

=== Halesowen Grammar School ===
- Thomas Attwood, Liberal politician and economist, champion of the 1832 Reform Bill and first MP for Birmingham
- Michael Bradley, cricketer
- John Gowans, General of the Salvation Army from 1999 to 2002
- Sir Benjamin Hingley, 1st Baronet, Liberal MP for North Worcestershire from 1885 to 1895
- Audrey Kinnon, writer
- Eric Neale, car designer Singer Motors, Austin A40 Sports, Jensen Motors
- Bill Oddie, comedy writer and performer
- William Shenstone, landscape gardener and poet

=== The Earls High School ===
- Gary Titley, teacher at this school, MEP and leader of the EPLP
- Philip Tibbetts, HM March Pursuivant Extraordinary - The Court of the Lord Lyon (2021-)
