= Mayor of Dudley =

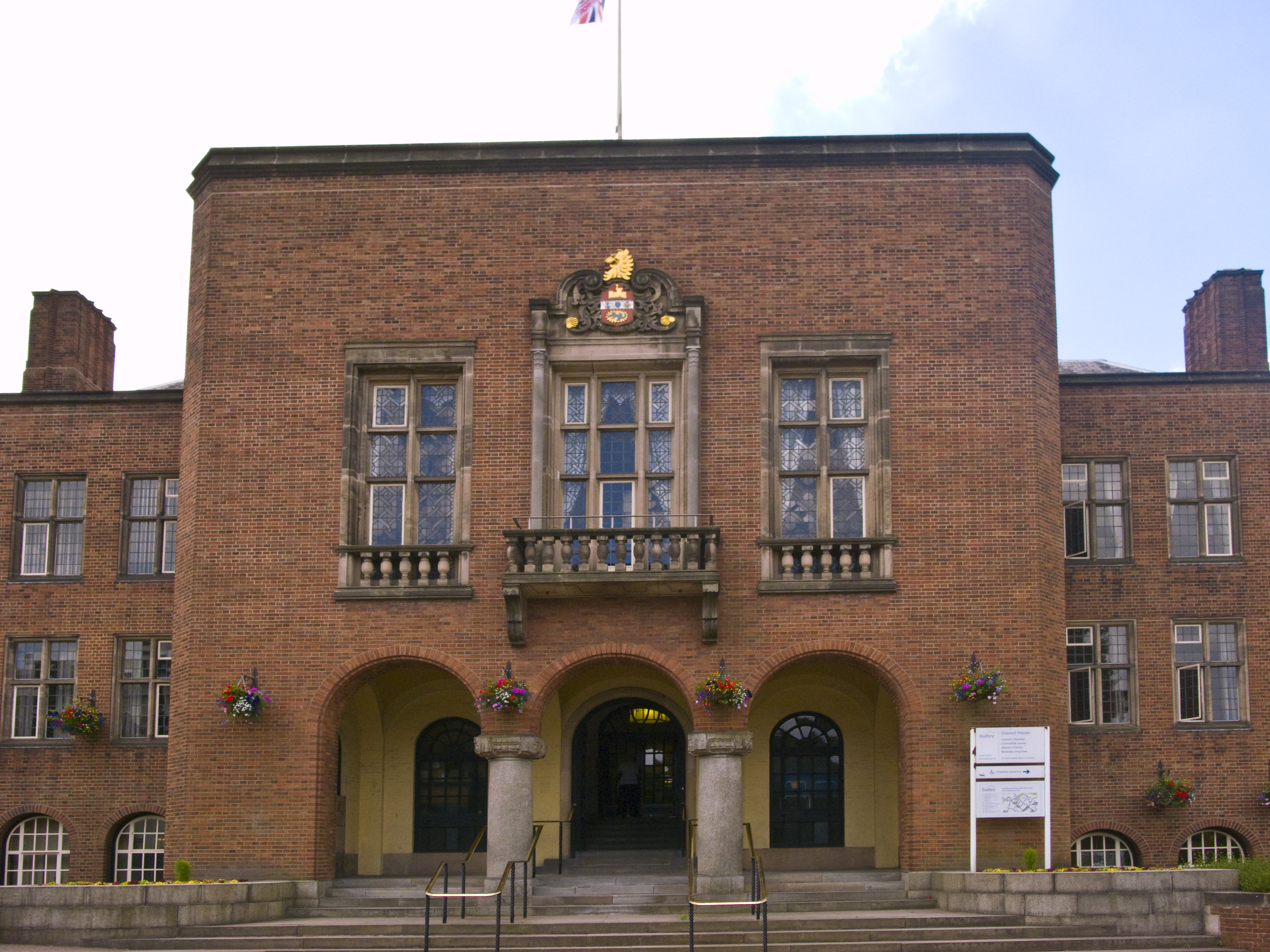
The Mayor's Parlour is situated in the Council House, Priory Road, Dudley

The Mayor of Dudley is an office held by a councillor of the Metropolitan Borough of Dudley. The post is partly ceremonial although the mayor does also preside over full meetings of the council and has the duty of holding decision makers to account. The mayor is elected by fellow councillors in May of each year. Before 1865, when the municipal borough was incorporated, the position was associated with the Court Leet of the Lords of Dudley, which governed the borough of Dudley from at least the middle of the 16th century and probably from the Middle Ages. The earliest known mayor, John A’Parke was selected in 1565.

== History ==
In the earliest records, the Mayor of Dudley was an official of the Court Leet of the Lords of Dudley. This was a manorial court that provided local governance to the borough of Dudley. The first named mayor is John A'Parke who was mayor in 1565. Records of the court leet before the middle of the 18th century are sparse so only a few names of the earliest mayors are known. One notable early mayor was the ironmaster, Richard Foley, chosen in 1615. Oliver Dixon, mayor in 1690, came from a prominent local family that gave their name to the Dixons Green area of Dudley. Although the leading body governing the town changed in 1791, as the Town Commissioners came into being, the court leet continued to meet until the year after the incorporation of the borough in 1865. The mayor selected in 1860 was Charles Francis George Clark, author of The Curiosities of Dudley and the Black Country.

Since 1865 mayors have been chosen from an elected councillor. The first mayor of the new municipal borough, selected on 20 June 1865, was Frederick Smith, Mineral Agent to the Earl of Dudley. One of his first acts was to organize tea, cake, refreshments and entertainment for 4,000 local school children at his residence at the Priory, Dudley. Smith's tenure of the position was short, as on 9 November 1865 his successor, Charles Cochrane was selected by the council. Smith's two successors as municipal mayor were also selected as mayors of the Court Leet. A notable mayor from this period was the industrialist Noah Hingley (1869–70). Noah's son Benjamin Hingley was the last mayor of the municipal borough, serving two terms from 1887. The Local Government Act 1888 changed the status of Dudley to a County Borough, effective from 1 April 1889. The first mayor selected by the new authority was William Squires Gorton. Notable mayors from this period include William Humble Ward, 2nd Earl of Dudley (1895–96) and the founder of Bean Cars, Sir George Bean, who served three terms as mayor: in 1908 and 1911-1912. After the Earl of Dudley had finished his two terms, the next mayor was the Netherton-born George Henry Dunn, who had started his working life, still a child, in a colliery.

In 1929, John Harry Molyneux, became the first Labour Mayor of Dudley.

In 1933 there were a total of 4 different mayors during the year, as the mayor chosen in the previous year, Joseph Fulwood died at the very beginning of the year and his successor, Henry Joseph Golding, died in August of the same year. John Harry Molyneux was elected for the remainder of the municipal year until the selection of William Charles Williams.

In 1949, there was a difficulty in selecting a mayor because: "the more experienced eligibles were unable to accept for health reasons, and the younger councillors had to decline because they had neither the time to spare from their work nor the means to supplement the expenses allowed for the office". Eventually, John Harry Molyneux, who had first been mayor 20 years previously, was elected.

The first female Mayor of Dudley was Dr Katherine Churchill Rogers. She was elected in 1971, and then again in 1985. In 1974 the Metropolitan Borough of Dudley was created from the former County Borough of Dudley and other neighbouring local authorities. The first mayor of the new Metropolitan Borough of Dudley was Mrs. Mary J.Pargeter.

The present custom is to elect the mayor and deputy mayor in May of each year. The position of Mayoress or Consort is appointed by the mayor and is usually the spouse of the mayor. The position of Mayor is partly ceremonial although the office holder also presides over meetings of the full council and has the duty of holding council decision makers to account. The mayor also raises money for nominated charities during the period of office.

== Regalia ==
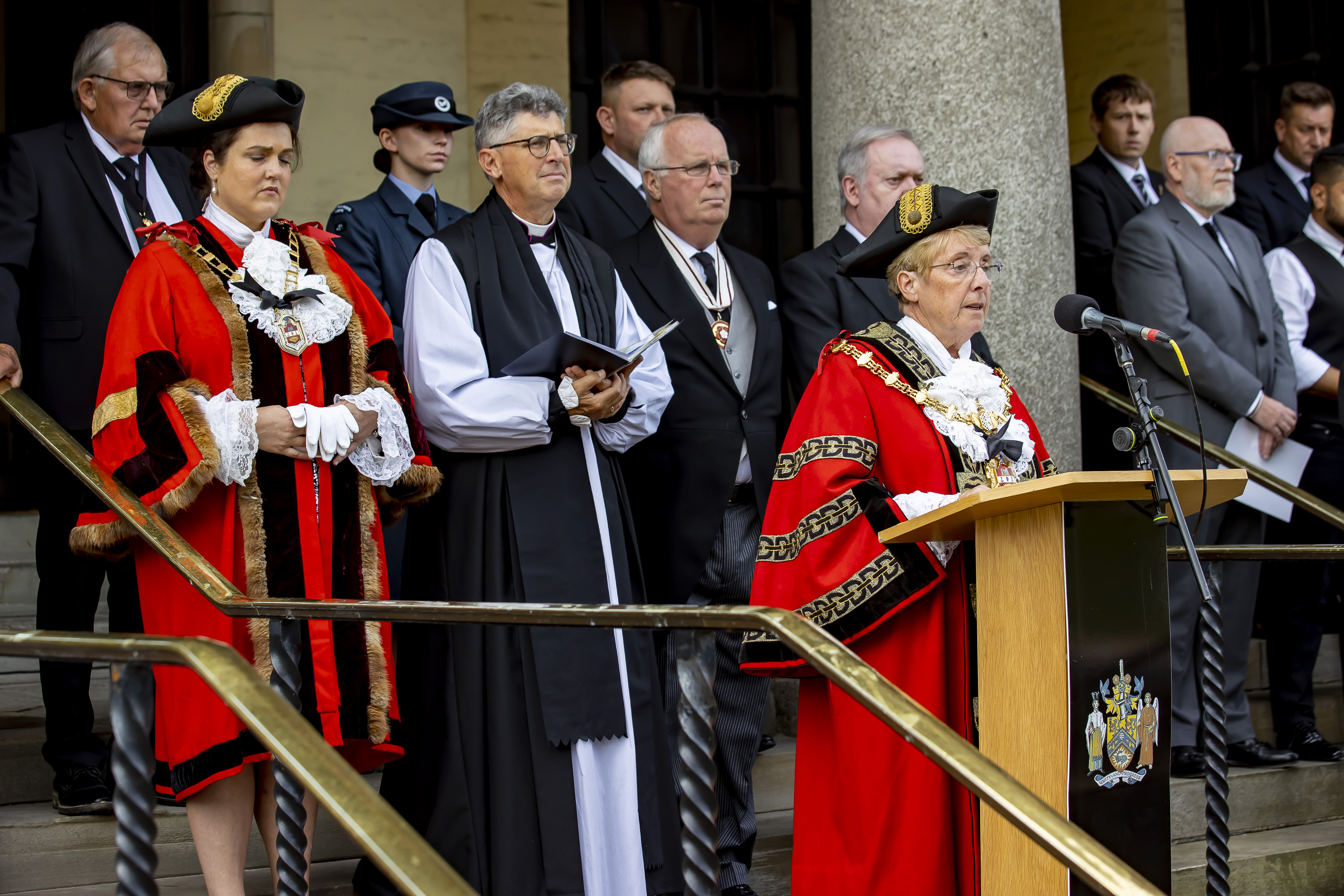
Mayor (at podium) and Deputy Mayor (left) during the proclamation ceremony of King Charles’ III accession to the throne.

Both the mayor and deputy mayor have ceremonial robes. The mayor also has a badge and chain as does the mayoress or consort. Since the badges predate the creation of the Metropolitan Borough in 1974, they carry the civic arms of the County Borough of Dudley. The regalia also includes a mace and staff. The silver mace, the oldest item in the regalia, was presented by William, Viscount Dudley and Ward to the town of Dudley in 1798.

== Mayors of Dudley ==
=== Early mayors ===
Sources: Chandler and Hannah, History of the Mayor of Dudley, and St Thomas Churchwardens.

- John A'Parke (1565)
- Humphrey Jukes (1584)
- Richard Foley (1615)
- Edward Robinson (1619–20)
- Thomas Lowe (1629)
- John Smart (1631)
- Thomas Finch (1636)
- John Bagley (1637)
- John Dunton (1650)
- William Hancox (1653)
- Gilbert Jelians (1654)
- Edmund Wells (1667)
- John Bowers (1670)
- Oliver Dixon (1690)

=== 18th century Mayors of the Court Leet ===
Source: Chandler and Hannah

- Edward Hodgetts (1714)
- William Parkes (1732)
- John Homer (1759)
- John Bridgewater (1761)
- Benjamin Pickrell (1763)
- Herbert Hancox (1764)
- Thomas Dudley (1765)
- Abiathar Hancox (1766)
- Joseph Dixon (1767)
- Daniel Shaw (1768)
- Phillips Penn (1769)
- William Finch (1770)
- Benjamin Bate (1771)
- Joseph Stokes (1772)
- Joseph Johnson (1773)
- Stephen Gorton (1774)
- Joseph Aston (1775)
- Joseph Bourne (1776)
- Charles Maxwell (1777)
- John Caddick (1778)
- Benjamin Price (1779)
- George Denton (1780)
- Richard Parkes (1781)
- John Hancox (1782)
- Benjamin Hughes (1783)
- Edward Hancox (1784)
- John Onions (1785)
- George Jones (1786)
- Richard Bunn (1787)
- Joseph Hartil (1788)
- Benjamin Vanes (1789)
- William Royle (1790)
- Edward Geast (1795)
- Zachariah Parkes (1796)
- Joseph Moon (1797)
- John Terry (1798)
- Robert Wallace (1799)

=== 19th century Mayors of the Court Leet ===
- Harry Wilcox (1800)
- Benjamin Stokes (1802)
- Joseph Royle (1803)
- Josiah Twamley (1804)
- Charles Roberts (1805)
- Richard Phillips (1806)
- Thomas Stiles (1807)
- John Green (1808)
- Benjamin Stokes (1809)
- Thomas Homer (1810)
- Alexander Gordon (1811)
- Thomas Styles (1812)
- Joseph Hollington (1813)
- Thomas Oldham Chinner (1814)
- Edward Guest (1815)
- Benjamin Whitehouse (1816)
- Richard Moore (1817)
- Francis Downing (1818-1819)
- Thomas Wainwright (1820)
- Cornelius Cartwright (1821)
- Joseph Green Bourne (1822-1823)
- Abiathar Hawkes (1824)
- Edward Dodson Salisbury (1825)
- John Roberts (1826-1827)
- Walter Williams (1828)
- James Bourne (1829)
- Joseph Cartwright Brettell (1830)
- Francis Downing (1831)
- Joseph Green Bourne (1832)
- William Bennitt (1833-1834)
- John Roberts (1835)
- John Williams (1836)
- Henry Dudley Bourne (1837)
- Charles Fleetwood Hewitt (1838)
- Joseph Payton (1839)
- Thomas Beach (1840)
- Henry Money Wainwright (1841-1842)
- Edward Terry (1843-1844)
- James Fisher (1845-1846)
- Elliott Hollies (1847)
- Edward Terry (1848)
- Thomas Fereday (1849-1851)
- Edward Lowe Cresswell (1852-1853)
- Edward Terry 1854
- Edward Fisher Smith 1855
- John Renaud 1856
- Elliott Hollier 1857
- Theophilus Finsley 1859
- Charles Francis George Clark 1860
- Edward Grainger 1861
- Henry Money Wainwright 1862
- Samuel Rudge (1863-1864)

=== Mayors of the Municipal Borough of Dudley ===
- Frederick Smith(1865)
- Charles Cochrane(1865)
- William Harrison (1866)
- Job Taylor (1867–68)
- Noah Hingley (1869–70)
- George Baggot (1871)
- Samuel Rudge (1872)
- William Wilkinson (1873)
- Joseph Stokes (1874-1875)
- George Thompson (1876)
- William North (1877-1878)
- Henry Wainwright (1879-1880)
- Job Garratt (1881-1882)
- David Howat (1883-1884)
- William Elwell Walker (1885-1886)
- Benjamin Hingley (1887-1888)

=== Mayors of the County Borough of Dudley ===
Source: Dudley MBC, Atkins, Matthews and Robins and Chandler and Hannah

- William Squires Gorton (1889)
- Henry Griffin Walker (1890)
- Gilbert Henry Claughton (1891-1894)
- William Humble Ward, 2nd Earl of Dudley (1895-1896)
- George Henry Dunn (1897-1898)
- Edward Granger (1899-1900)
- John Hughes (1901-1903)
- George Frederick Thompson (1904-1905)
- Frederick William Cook (1906-1907)
- Sir George Bean (1908)
- Joseph Alfred Hillman (1909-1910)
- Sir George Bean (1911-1912)
- Samuel Cook Lloyd (1913-1916)
- Thomas Chambers (1917)
- Thomas Willetts Adshead (1918-1919)
- Herbert William Hughes (1920-1921)
- Thomas William Tanfield (1922-1923)
- James Smellie (1924–25)
- William Bradford (1926)
- Francis James Ballard (1927-1928)
- John Harry Molyneux (1929-1930)
- Joseph Fulwood (1931-1932)
- Henry Joseph Golding (1933)
- John Harry Molyneux (1933)
- William Charles Williams (1933-1934)
- Joseph Leonard Hillman (1935-1936)
- Alexander Elliot Young (1937-1938)
- Bertie Thomas Harwood (1939-1940)
- Harry Clifford Whitehouse (1941-1942)
- Thomas Edward Bennett (1943)
- Arthur Lionel Hillman (1944)
- Thomas Edward Bennett (1945)
- John Collcott Price (1946)
- Reginald Little (1947–48)
- John Harry Molyneux (1949)
- George Sydney Marlow (1950-1951)
- Arthur Mathew Silcox (1952-1953)
- George Bertram Norton (1954)
- William Wakeman (1955)
- Samuel Danks (1956)
- Joseph Lawrence Billingham (1957)
- Frederick George Lewis (1958)
- John Marsh (1959)
- Charles Norman Preedy (1960)
- Harold Pritchard (1961)
- Frank T. Webb (1962)
- William H. Wallace Poulton (1963)
- W. George Griffiths (1964)
- Charles E Clarke (1965)
- T.Wells (1966)
- C.Homer (1967)
- Fredrick J.Williams (1968)
- W.W. Henley (1969)
- Joseph G. Rowley (1970)
- Dr. Katherine Churchill Rogers (1971)
- Edward Morris (1972)
- Joseph Jones (1973)

=== Mayors of the Metropolitan Borough of Dudley ===
- Mary J.Pargeter (1974)
- John T.Wilson (1975)
- Denis Harty (1976)
- Jim Taylor (1977)
- S. Fairfold (1978)
- Gwen Homer (1979)
- Ron Pearson (1980)
- Robert Griffiths (1981)
- David Ranceford-Hadley (1982)
- David M.Caunt (1983)
- Lucy Hingley (1984)
- Dr Katherine Churchill Rogers(1985)
- F.J. Bradley (1986)
- John D.Davies (1987)
- Celia Hough (1988)
- Sam Davies (1989)
- Cyril Woodhall (1990)
- Geoff Tromans (1991)
- Bill Webb (1992)
- Mary Whitehouse (1993)
- John Simpson (1994)
- Sheila Anne Portman (1995)
- William Peter Cody (1996)
- Mary Kathleen Hill (1997)
- Ken Finch (1998)
- Fred Hunt (1999)
- George Davies (2000)
- John Walters (2001)
- Margaret Wilson (2002)
- Rosemary Tomkinson (2003)
- Malcom Fredrick William Knowles (2004)
- Ian Marshall Kettle (2005)
- John Woodall (2006)
- David Stanley (2007)
- Antony Raymond Burston(2008)
- Patricia Martin (2009)
- Peter Miller (2010)
- Michael Evans (2011)
- Melvyn Mottram (2012)
- Alan Finch (2013)
- Margaret Aston (2014)
- Steve Waltho (2015)
- Mohammed Hanif (2016)
- Dave Tyler (2017)
- Alan Taylor (2018)
- David Stanley (2019-2020 (Note: Nominations for the Mayor's position were suspended for 2020 due to the COVID-19 pandemic.))
- Anne Millward (2021)
- Sue Greenaway (2022)
- Andrea Goddard (2023)
- Hilary Bills (2024)
