= Michael Bradley =

Michael or Mike Bradley may refer to:

== Politicians ==
- Michael Bradley (politician) (died 1923), Irish politician
- Michael J. Bradley (politician) (1897–1979), U.S. politician
- Michael J. Bradley (colonial administrator) (1933–2010), Governor of the Turks and Caicos, 1987–1993
- Mike Bradley (politician) (born 1955), Canadian politician

== Sports ==
- Michael Bradley (rugby union, born 1897) (1897–1951), Irish and British Lions rugby union player
- Michael Bradley (cricketer) (born 1934), English cricketer
- Mike Bradley (sprinter) (born 1961), American former sprinter
- Michael Bradley (rugby union, born 1962), Irish former rugby union player and coach of Edinburgh Rugby
- Michael Bradley (golfer) (born 1966), American professional golfer
- Mike Bradley (Canadian football) (born 1978), Canadian Football League player
- Michael Bradley (basketball) (born 1979), American basketball player
- Michael Bradley (soccer) (born 1987), American soccer player
- Michael Bradley (hurler) (born 1994), Irish hurler

== Other people ==
- Michael Bradley (businessman), British businessman, chief executive of Defence Equipment and Support
- Michael Bradley (musician) (born 1959), bassist for The Undertones
- Michael Bradley (singer), former lead singer of Paul Revere & the Raiders and composer (Robotech)
- Mike Bradley, General Secretary of the General Federation of Trade Unions
- Mike Bradley, President and CEO of Teradyne
- Michael Bradley, author known for promoting the theory that Jews are descended from Neanderthals

== See also ==
- Michael Brantley (born 1987), American baseball player
