= Brettle =

Brettle may refer to:

== People ==
Notable people with the surname include:

- Audrey Brettle (1937–2003), author
- Bob Brettle (1832–1870), bare-knuckle boxer

== Places ==
- Brettle (also spelt Britwell or Brettell), a hamlet that was formerly part of the manor of Kingswinford, now part of Brierley Hill, West Midlands, England

== Etymology and Origins ==
- Toponymic (Locational): A prominent theory, supported by local archaeological research, suggests the name is derived from Bredhill, a geographic location in the parish of Kingswinford. This aligns with the heavy localization of the name in the Stourbridge and Dudley areas since the 17th century.
- Celtic/Breton: The name may be a diminutive of the Old Breton name Brithael (later Bretel or Britel), which appeared in English records as early as 1035 (e.g., Godwin Brytael).
- Norman: Some sources link the name to the de Breteuil family, specifically Roger de Breteuil, 2nd Earl of Hereford, though a direct genealogical link following the forfeiture of his lands in 1075 is difficult to verify.
- Huguenot: While occasionally attributed to 16th-century Huguenots, local records suggest this connection may stem from marriages between French settlers and existing Brettell families in the West Midlands rather than a French origin for the name itself.

== Distribution ==
Historically, the name has shown a high degree of geographic consistency.

- United Kingdom: Census data from 1841 to 1911 consistently places the highest density of the name in Worcestershire and Staffordshire, specifically within the Black Country. Industrial migration, particularly in coal mining, saw the name spread to Yorkshire and Kent in the late 19th century. In the present day the name Brettle and Brettell is still strongly localised in the West Midlands area of the UK
- Germany: A separate cluster of the name "Brettle" exists in southwest Germany (Baden-Württemberg), where it may be an occupational surname derived from the Swabian dialect word for a "small board" (Brettle), referring to a simple meal or a provider of such food.
- Global: Significant populations are also found in the United States (primarily Pennsylvania and New York) and Australia, following 19th-century emigration patterns from the UK.

== See also ==
- Brittle (disambiguation)
