= N. Hingley & Sons Ltd =

English metalworking company 1848 to 1966

N. Hingley & Sons Ltd was a firm that originated in the Black Country region of England. It was founded by Noah Hingley (1796–1877) who started making chain near the village of Cradley. The firm moved to Netherton around 1852, where large scale chain and anchor manufacturing works were set up on the Dudley No.2 canal. One of the products of the firm was the anchor of the RMS Titanic which on completion in 1911 was drawn through the streets of Netherton on a wagon drawn by 20 shire horses.

== History ==
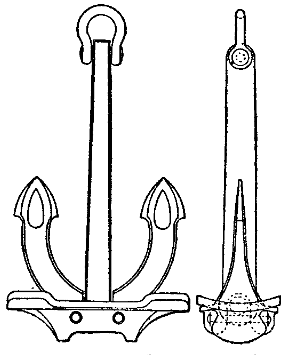
Hall's patent anchor: Hingley's became sole manufacturers of these anchors in 1891

Noah Hingley started making cable chain for ships at Cradley in the Black Country in 1820 after receiving an order from a Liverpool shipowner. He formed the company N. Hingley & Sons in 1838. Anchor production commenced in 1848.

In 1850 it was stated that "Messrs. Noah Hingley & Sons are extensively engaged in the manufacturing of anchors, anvils, and chain and chain cables" at Cradley. Around 1852 the firm acquired an additional site near the village of Netherton where a large scale chain and anchor works was created on the banks of the Dudley No. 2 canal.

The firm subsequently acquired coal mines such as at Old Hill, Dudley Wood and Coombs Hill and blast furnaces including: the Netherton Ironworks, The Harts Hill Iron Works and the Old Hill Furnaces.

In 1856, the company supplied towing chain for use by boats on the Seine. Subsequently, the firm supplied 20 miles of towing chain for use on the Neckar.

In 1857, it was reported that the firm had completed an "immense cable" for the steam ship Adriatic. The chain cable was of length 40 yards and each link weighed 50 lb. The firm was stated to have been in the process of making a chain cable for the SS Great Eastern, with even more substantial links.

In 1860, the Institution of Mechanical Engineers reported on a visit to Birmingham and the Black Country, where, at the Round Oak Ironworks, they examined examples of iron bar of up to 3 1/2 inches in diameter which had been bent into knots whilst cold using "one of the most powerful hydraulic engines in the kingdom, belonging to Messrs. Noah Hingley and Sons at Cradley".

In 1863, the firm had 4 blast furnaces in the Dudley District.

After Noah Hingley's death, the firm was run by his son Benjamin Hingley (1830–1905) before passing to Benjamin's nephew George Benjamin Hingley (1850–1918).

The writer William Curzon gave a detailed description of the company's works in the early 1880s. He stated that the company had the facilities to produce over 36,000 tons of pig iron per year as well as 60,000 tons of finished bar iron and 10,000 tons of anchors and chain per annum.

The firm was reported as employing around 3,000 people in 1885.

In 1890, the family firm N. Hingley and Sons became incorporated, becoming a limited company trading as N. Hingley and Sons Limited. Shares were allocated to family members, with the bulk (1300 shares) being held by the founder's son Benjamin Hingley, and the two grandsons George Benjamin Hingley (600 shares) and Henry Montagu Hingley (400 shares).

The firm entered into an agreement in 1891 to become the sole manufacturer of the Hall's patent anchor. Later versions of this anchor were supplied to the great ocean liners and battleships of the late nineteenth and early twentieth century.

In 1906, the company made anchors and chain for the ocean liners Lusitania and Mauretania.

At the end of 1907, the firm took the first step towards loosening family ownership when George Frederick Simms (who owned the chainmaker George Hartshorn & Co was brought into the business. In the following month Cyril Edward Lloyd entered the firm as a director.

In August 1910, N. Hingley & Sons completed an anchor for the White Star liner, Olympic. It was claimed that the anchor was the biggest ever produced, weighing 15 tons 5 1/4 cwt, with length 19 ft and width 10 ft.

In 1911, the company manufactured the anchors and chain for the ocean liner RMS Titanic. The largest of the anchors weighed 15.5 tons and on completion was drawn through the streets of Netherton on a wagon drawn by 20 shire horses. The chain and fittings for the anchors weighed around 100 tons.

In 1918, control of the firm moved away from the Hingley family, when Cyril Lloyd became chairman of the board. Lloyd served as chairman until 1958.

In 1919 Percy Jump, an engineer from Sheffield joined the staff. By 1926 he was effectively works manager at the Netherton site. Percy Jump was responsible for introducing precision forging into Hingley's which became very important for the firm after 1945.

In September 1959, at the 69th annual general meeting of N. Hingley & Sons Ltd, it was stated that the parent company comprised 29 active subsidiaries, with manufacturing activities including: chain and anchor making; forging steels and other materials such as titanium; steel re-rolling; iron and steel founding; drop stamping; structural engineering; and the manufacture of pressure vessels.

On 31 December 1960, Cyril Lloyd stepped down from the Board of the company after 53 years of service.

The company was bought out by F. H. Lloyd & Co. in 1966.

In 1967, it was stated that N. Hingley & Sons (Netherton) Ltd was making components for the Bristol Siddeley Olympus 593 engine, which was intended to power the supersonic passenger aircraft, Concorde.

The Netherton works continued in production for around 20 more years. However, after a number of company reorganisations, take overs and sell-offs, the Netherton part of the business, then called Wright Hingley, finally closed in 1986 and was demolished three years later. The site was then redeveloped as an industrial estate called the Washington Centre.

== See also ==
- Murray's Hypocycloidal Engine
- YouTube video of hand-forging chains and anchors at Hingley's
