= George Benjamin Hingley =

English industrialist and baronet (1850–1918)

Sir George Benjamin Hingley, 2nd Baronet, (9 September 1850–19 August 1918) was an English industrialist who was head of the large family firm N. Hingley and Sons Ltd from 1905 until his death in 1918.

== Life ==
George Benjamin Hingley, born 9 September 1850, was the son of Hezekiah Hingley and Fanny Georgina, daughter of William Thompson of Aigburth, Liverpool. His grandfather, Noah Hingley had founded the firm N. Hingley and Sons, which during the nineteenth century became a large scale manufacturer of chain cables and anchors as well as a producer of iron. The company also operated coal mines. The family lived in the Liverpool area until the death of Hezekiah in 1865, when they moved to North Worcestershire. George attended Halesowen Grammar School.

George Benjamin Hingley was active in the family-owned industries for many years, particularly after 1895 when his uncle Benjamin Hingley who had succeeded the founder, Noah, as head of the firm, became ill. George was head of the firm after 1905 on the death of his uncle, when he also succeeded to the baronetcy, first awarded to Benjamin Hingley.

He became Chairman of N. Hingley & Sons Ltd., as well as of the Harts Hill Iron Company and of Lloyds British Testing Company Ltd.

At various times, he occupied the posts of Deputy-Lieutenant, magistrate, and County Councillor for Worcestershire. He was High Sheriff of Worcestershire in 1911.

George Benjamin Hingley died on 19 August 1918 aged 67, at his residence, High Park, Droitwich.

Baronetage of the United Kingdom
| Preceded by Sir Benjamin Hingley | Baronet (of Hatherton Lodge); 1905–1918 | Extinct |
Honorary titles
| Preceded by George Ferguson Chance | High Sheriff of Worcestershire; 1911 – 1912 | Succeeded by Rowland Hill |
