= Brittle (disambiguation) =

Brittleness is the liability of a material to fracture when subjected to stress.

Brittle or brittleness may also refer to:

- Brittle (food), a confection made of caramel and nuts
- Loch Brittle, on the coast of the Isle of Skye, Scotland
- Cliff Brittle, English businessman
- Software brittleness, a type of computer error

== See also ==
- Brettle
- Brittle base class
