= Outback =

Sparsely populated interior of Australia

- Area
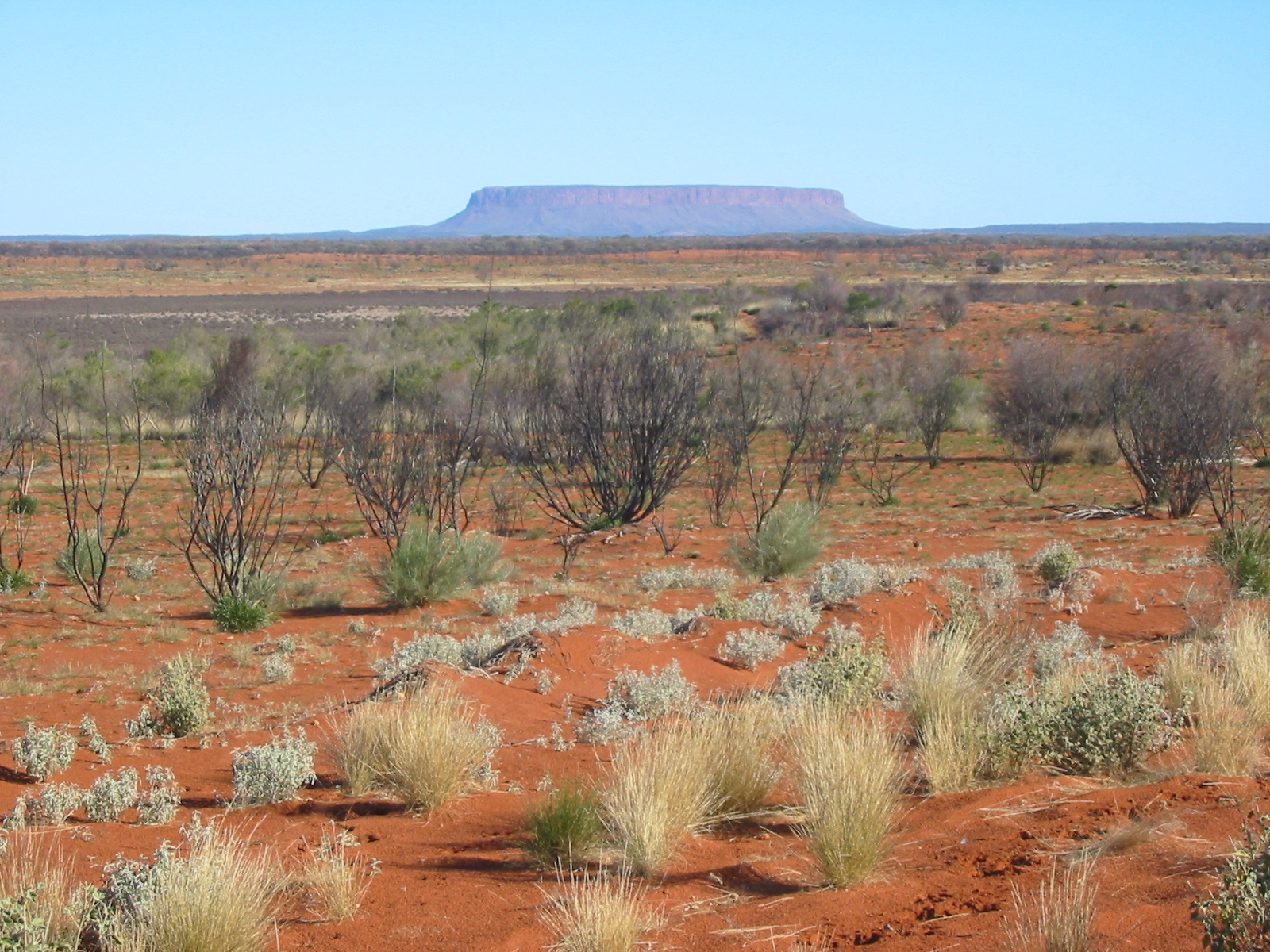
- View across sand plains and salt pans to Mount Conner, Central Australia

- Red and dark red areas form the Outback; dark red and striped areas form the modern Outback. (Note: The "modern Outback" is an area determined by cultural and natural factors, from a study by the Pew Charitable Trusts.)
- Coordinates: 25°S 130°E
- Country: Australia
- Continent: Oceania

Population
  - Total: 607,000 (Rangelands) (Note: As the definition of the outback varies by population, no universal figure can be determined. This figure is for the legally defined area of the Rangelands, which is sometimes referred to as the Outback.)

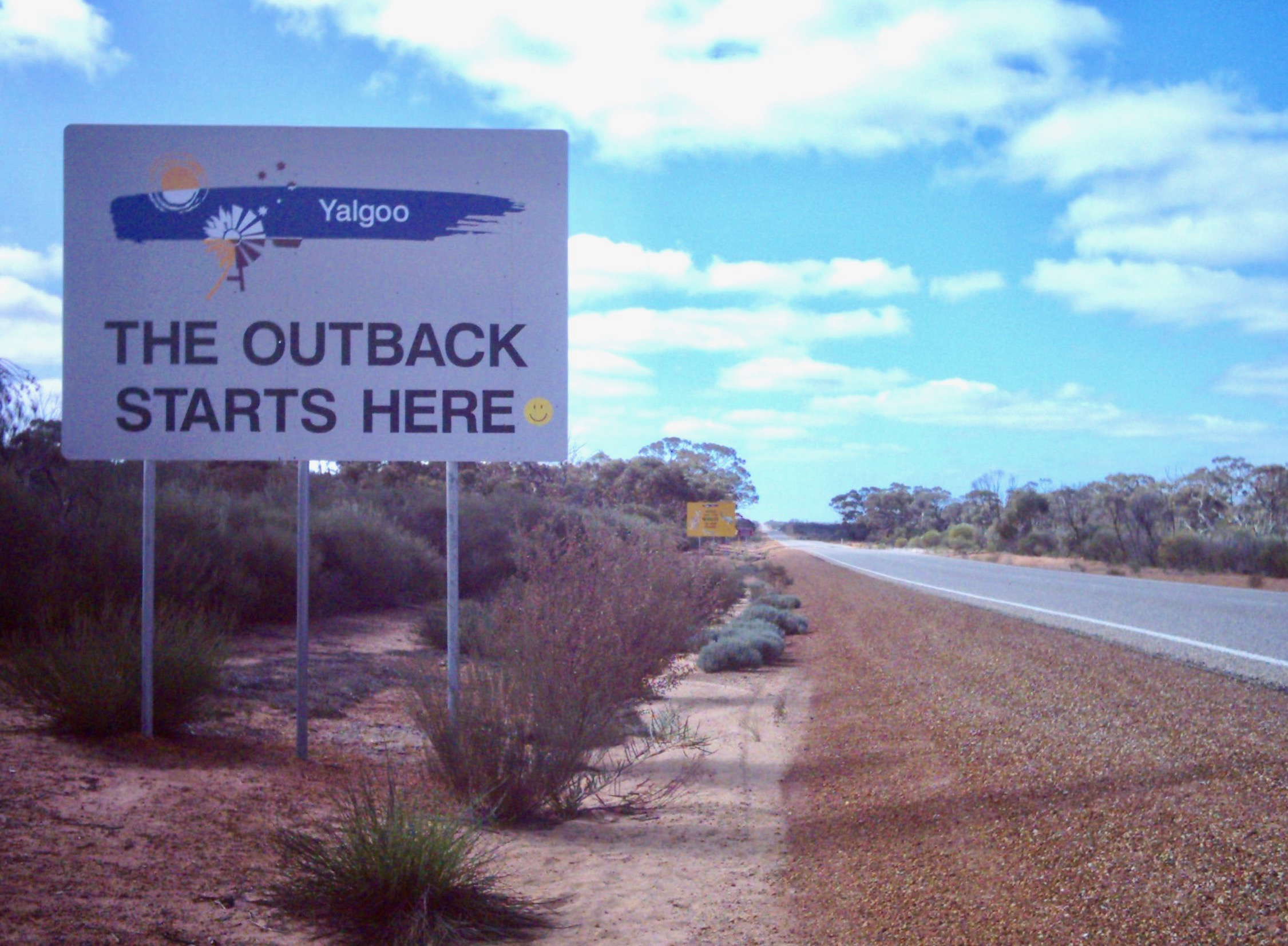
Tourism sign post in Yalgoo, Western Australia

The Outback is a remote, vast, sparsely populated area of Australia. It is more remote than what Australians call "the bush". While often envisaged as being arid, the Outback regions extend from the northern to southern Australian coastlines and encompass a number of climatic zones, including tropical and monsoonal climates in northern areas, arid areas in the "red centre" and semi-arid and temperate climates in southerly regions. The total population is estimated at 607,000 people. (Note: As the definition of the outback varies by population, no universal figure can be determined. This figure is for the legally defined area of the Rangelands, which is sometimes referred to as the Outback.)

Geographically, the Outback is unified by a combination of factors, most notably a low human population density, a largely intact natural environment and, in many places, low-intensity land uses, such as pastoralism (livestock grazing) in which production is reliant on the natural environment. The Outback is deeply ingrained in Australian heritage, history and folklore. In Australian art the subject of the Outback has been vogue, particularly in the 1940s. In 2009, as part of the Q150 celebrations, the Queensland Outback was announced as one of the Q150 Icons of Queensland for its role as a "natural attraction".

== History ==
Aboriginal peoples have lived in the Outback for at least 50,000 years and occupied all Outback regions, including the driest deserts, when Europeans first entered central Australia in the 1800s. Many Aboriginal Australians retain strong physical and cultural links to their traditional country and are legally recognised as the Traditional Owners of large parts of the Outback under Commonwealth Native Title legislation.

Early European exploration of inland Australia was sporadic. More focus was on the more accessible and fertile coastal areas. The first party to successfully cross the Blue Mountains just outside Sydney was led by Gregory Blaxland in 1813, 25 years after the colony was established. People, starting with John Oxley in 1817, 1818 and 1821, followed by Charles Sturt from 1829 to 1830, attempted to follow the westward-flowing rivers to find an "inland sea", but these were found to all flow into the Murray River and Darling River, which turn south.

From 1858 onwards, the so-called "Afghan" cameleers and their beasts played an instrumental role in opening up the Outback and helping to build infrastructure.

Over the period 1858 to 1861, John McDouall Stuart led six expeditions north from Adelaide, South Australia, into the Outback, culminating in successfully reaching the north coast of Australia and returning without the loss of any of the party's members' lives. This contrasts with the ill-fated Burke and Wills expedition in 1860–61 which was much better funded, but resulted in the deaths of three of the members of the transcontinental party.

The Overland Telegraph line was constructed in the 1870s along the route identified by Stuart.

In 1865, the surveyor George Goyder, using changes in vegetation patterns, mapped a line in South Australia, north of which he considered rainfall to be too unreliable to support agriculture.

Exploration of the Outback continued in the 1950s when Len Beadell explored, surveyed and built many roads in support of the nuclear weapons tests at Emu Field and Maralinga and rocket testing on the Woomera Prohibited Area. Mineral exploration continues as new mineral deposits are identified and developed.

2002 was declared the Year of the Outback. While the early explorers used horses to cross the Outback, the first woman to make the journey riding a horse was Anna Hingley, who rode from Broome to Cairns in 2006.

== Environment ==
=== Global significance ===
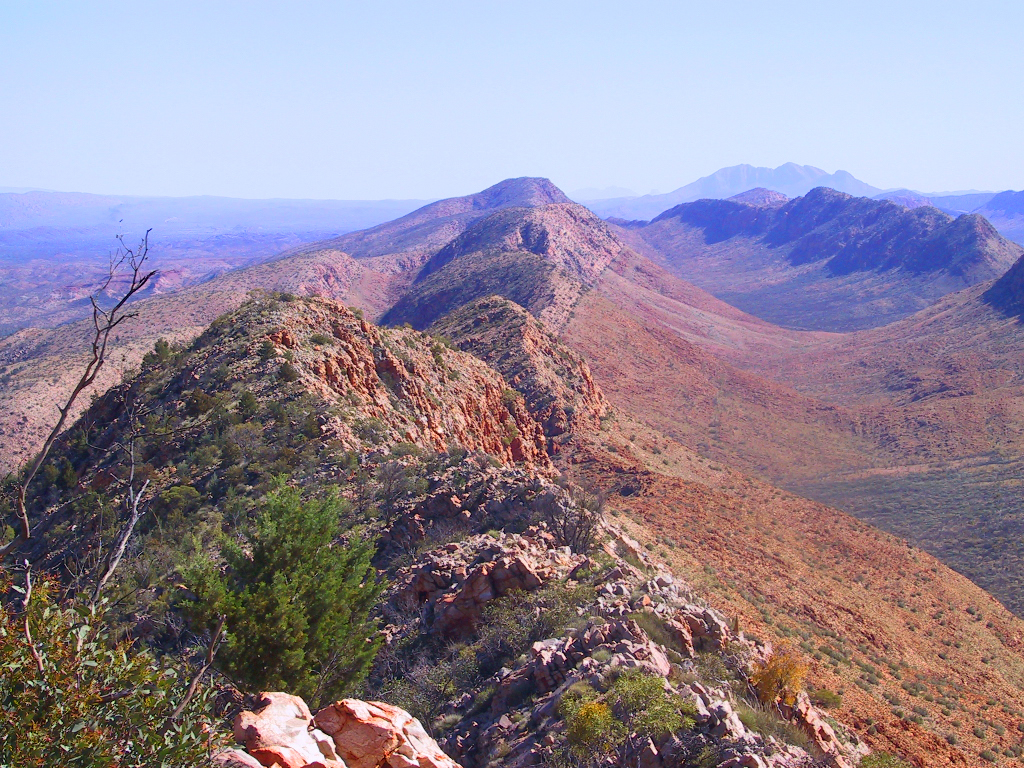
MacDonnell Ranges in the Northern Territory are found in the centre of the mainland.

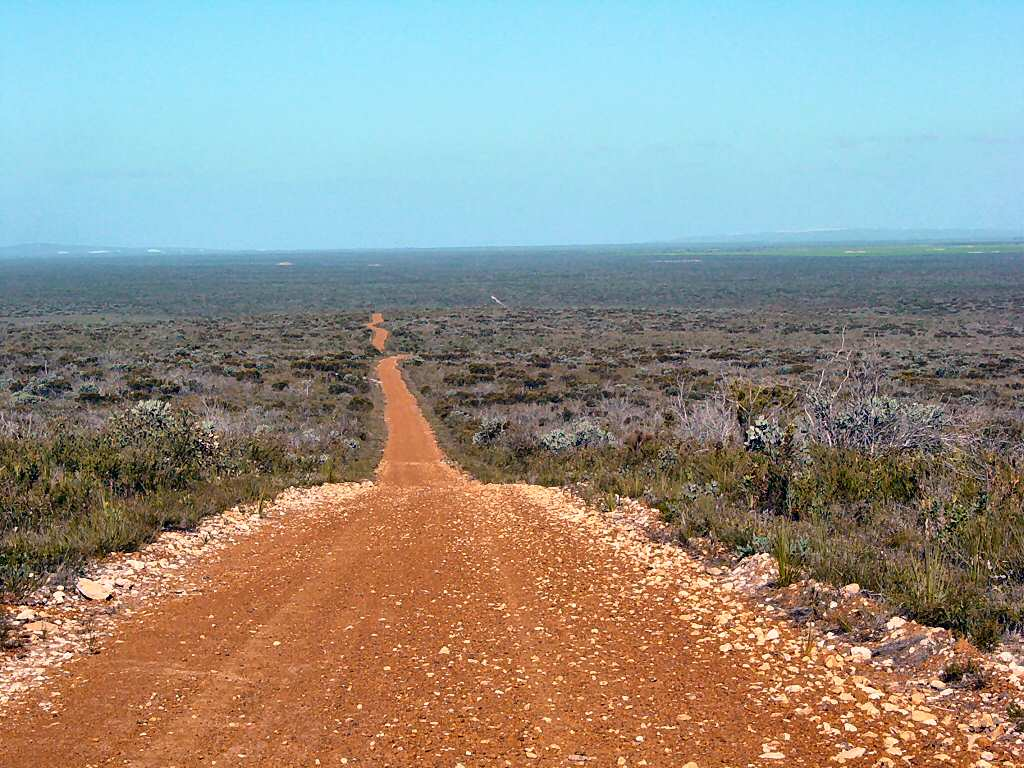
Fitzgerald River National Park in Western Australia

The paucity of industrial land use has led to the Outback being recognised globally as one of the largest remaining intact natural areas on Earth. Global "Human Footprint" and wilderness reviews highlight the importance of Outback Australia as one of the world's large natural areas, along with the Boreal forests and Tundra regions in North America, the Sahara and Gobi deserts and the tropical forests of the Amazon and Congo Basins. The savanna (or grassy woodlands) of northern Australia are the largest, intact savanna regions in the world. In the south, the Great Western Woodlands, which occupy 16,000,000 hectares (40,000,000 acres), an area larger than all of England and Wales, are the largest remaining temperate woodland left on Earth.

=== Major ecosystems ===
Reflecting the wide climatic and geological variation, the Outback contains a wealth of distinctive and ecologically rich ecosystems. Major land types include:

- the Kimberley and Pilbara regions in northern Western Australia,
- sub-tropical savanna landscape of the Top End,
- ephemeral water courses of the Channel Country in western Queensland,
- the ten deserts in central and western Australia,
- the Inland Ranges, such as the MacDonnell Ranges, which provide topographic variation across the flat plains,
- the flat Nullarbor Plain north of the Great Australian Bight, and
- the Great Western Woodlands in southern Western Australia.

=== Wildlife ===
The Outback is full of well-adapted wildlife, although much of it may not be immediately visible to the casual observer. Many animals, such as red kangaroos and dingoes, hide in bushes to rest and keep cool during the heat of the day.

Birdlife is prolific, most often seen at waterholes at dawn and dusk. Huge flocks of budgerigars, cockatoos, corellas and galahs are often sighted. On bare ground or roads during the winter, various species of snakes and lizards bask in the sun, but they are rarely seen during the summer months.

Feral animals such as camels thrive in central Australia, brought to Australia by pastoralists and explorers, along with the early Afghan drivers. Feral horses known as 'brumbies' are station horses that have run wild. Feral pigs, foxes, cats, goats and rabbits and other imported animals are also degrading the environment, so time and money is spent eradicating them in an attempt to help protect fragile rangelands.

The Outback is home to a diverse set of animal species, such as the kangaroo, emu and dingo. The Dingo Fence was built to restrict movements of dingoes and wild dogs into agricultural areas towards the south east of the continent. The marginally fertile parts are primarily utilised as rangelands and have been traditionally used for sheep or cattle grazing, on cattle stations which are leased from the Federal Government. While small areas of the outback consist of clay soils the majority has exceedingly infertile palaeosols.

Riversleigh, in Queensland, is one of Australia's most renowned fossil sites and was recorded as a World Heritage site in 1994. The 100 km^{2} (39 sq mi) area contains fossil remains of ancient mammals, birds and reptiles of Oligocene and Miocene age.

== Industry ==
=== Pastoralism ===
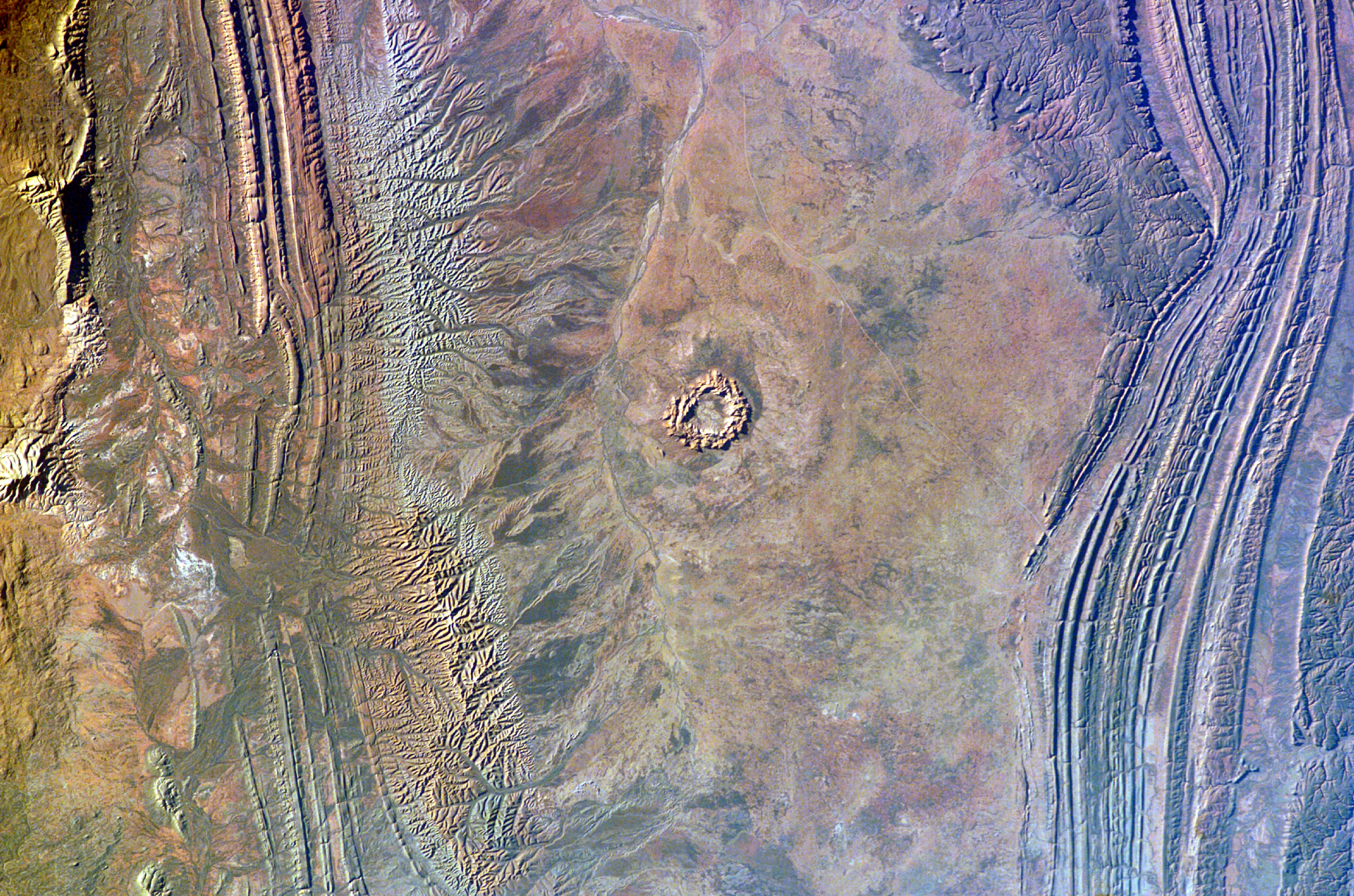
Gosses Bluff crater, one of a number of meteor impact craters that can be found across outback Australia

The largest industry across the Outback, in terms of the area occupied, is pastoralism, in which cattle, sheep, and sometimes goats are grazed in mostly intact, natural ecosystems. Widespread use of bore water, obtained from underground aquifers, including the Great Artesian Basin, has enabled livestock to be grazed across vast areas in which no permanent surface water exists naturally.

Capitalising on the lack of pasture improvement and absence of fertiliser and pesticide use, many Outback pastoral properties are certified as organic livestock producers. In 2014, 17,000,000 hectares (42,000,000 acres), most of which is in Outback Australia, was fully certified as organic farm production, making Australia the largest certified organic production area in the world.

=== Tourism ===
Tourism is a major industry across the Outback, and commonwealth and state tourism agencies explicitly target Outback Australia as a desirable destination for domestic and international travellers. There is no breakdown of tourism revenues for the "Outback" per se. However, regional tourism is a major component of national tourism incomes. Tourism Australia explicitly markets nature-based and Indigenous-led experiences to tourists. In the 2015–2016 financial year, 815,000 visitors spent $988 million while on holidays in the Northern Territory alone.

There are many popular tourist attractions in the Outback. Some of the well known destinations include Devils Marbles, Kakadu National Park, Kata Tjuta (The Olgas), MacDonnell Ranges and Uluru (Ayers Rock).

=== Mining ===
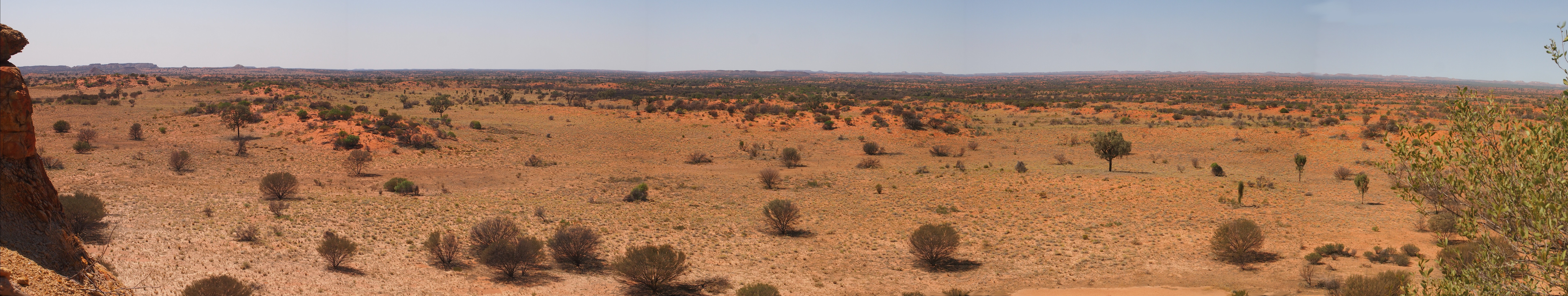
View of dunefields and mesa, Central Australia

Other than agriculture and tourism, the main economic activity in this vast and sparsely settled area is mining. Owing to the almost complete absence of mountain building and glaciation since the Permian (in many areas since the Cambrian) periods, the outback is extremely rich in iron, aluminium, manganese and uranium ores, and also contains major deposits of gold, nickel, copper, lead and zinc ores. Because of its size, the value of grazing and mining is considerable. Major mines and mining areas in the Outback include opals at Coober Pedy, Lightning Ridge and White Cliffs, metals at Broken Hill, Tennant Creek, Olympic Dam and the remote Challenger Mine. Oil and gas are extracted in the Cooper Basin around Moomba.

In Western Australia the Argyle diamond mine in the Kimberley was once the world's biggest producer of natural diamonds and contributed approximately one-third of the world's natural supply, but was closed down in 2020 due to financial reasons. The Pilbara region's economy is dominated by mining and petroleum industries. The Pilbara's oil and gas industry is the region's largest export industry, earning $5.0 billion in 2004/05 and accounting for over 96% of the state's production. Most of Australia's iron ore is also mined in the Pilbara and it also has one of the world's major manganese mines.

== Population ==
Aboriginal communities in outback regions, such as the Anangu Pitjantjatjara Yankunytjatjara lands in northern South Australia, have not been displaced as they have been in areas of intensive agriculture and large cities, in coastal areas.

The total population of the Outback in Australia declined from 700,000 in 1996 to 690,000 in 2006. The largest decline was in the Outback Northern Territory, while the Kimberley and Pilbara showed population increases during the same period. The sex ratio is 1040 males for 1000 females and 17% of the total population is indigenous.

== Facilities ==
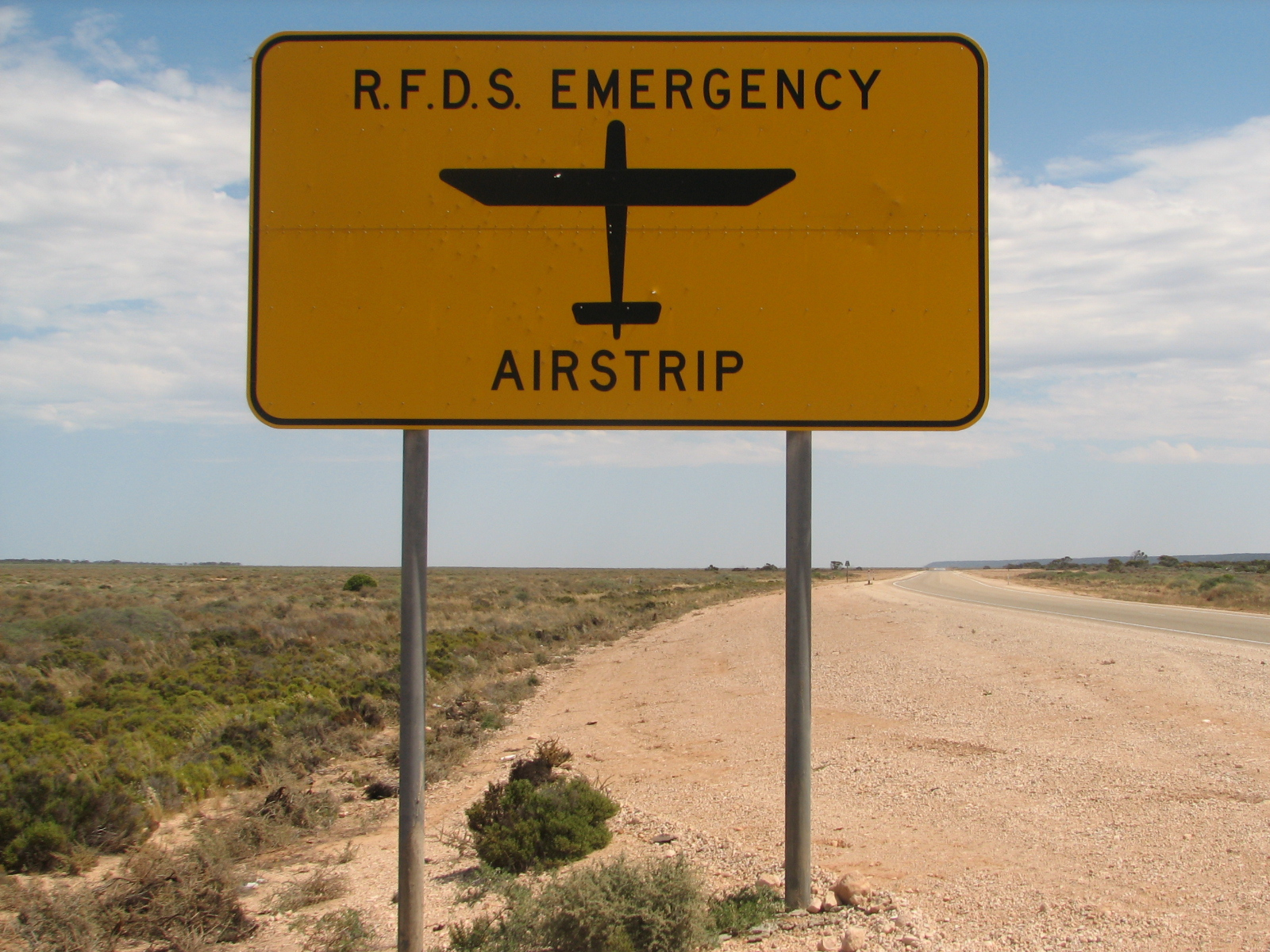
Sign on the Eyre Highway indicating that an RFDS emergency airstrip is ahead

The Royal Flying Doctor Service (RFDS) started service in 1928 and helps people who live in the outback of Australia. Previously, serious injuries or illnesses often meant death owing to the lack of proper medical facilities and trained personnel.

In many outback communities, the number of children is too small for a conventional school to operate. Children are educated at home by the School of the Air. Originally the teachers communicated with the children by radio, although this is now replaced by telephone and internet technology.

Some children attend boarding school, mostly those in secondary school.

== Terminology ==
The term "outback" derives from the adverbial phrase referring to the backyard of a house, and came to be used meiotically in the late 1800s to describe the vast sparsely settled regions of Australia behind the cities and towns. The earliest known use of the term in this context in print was in 1869, when the writer clearly meant the area west of Wagga Wagga, New South Wales. Over time, the adverbial use of the phrase was replaced with the present day noun form.

It is colloquially said that "the outback" is located "beyond the Black Stump". The location of the black stump may be some hypothetical location or may vary depending on local custom and folklore. It has been suggested that the term comes from the Black Stump Wine Saloon that once stood about 10 kilometres (6.2 mi) out of Coolah, New South Wales, on the Gunnedah Road. It is claimed that the saloon, named after the nearby Black Stump Run and Black Stump Creek, was an important staging post for traffic to north-west New South Wales and it became a marker by which people gauged their journeys.

"The Never-Never" is a term referring to remoter parts of the Outback. The Outback can also be referred to as "back of beyond" or "back o' Bourke", although these terms are more frequently used when referring to something a long way from anywhere, or a long way away. The well-watered north of the continent is often called the "Top End" and the arid interior "The Red Centre", owing to its vast amounts of red soil and sparse greenery amongst its landscape.

== Transport ==
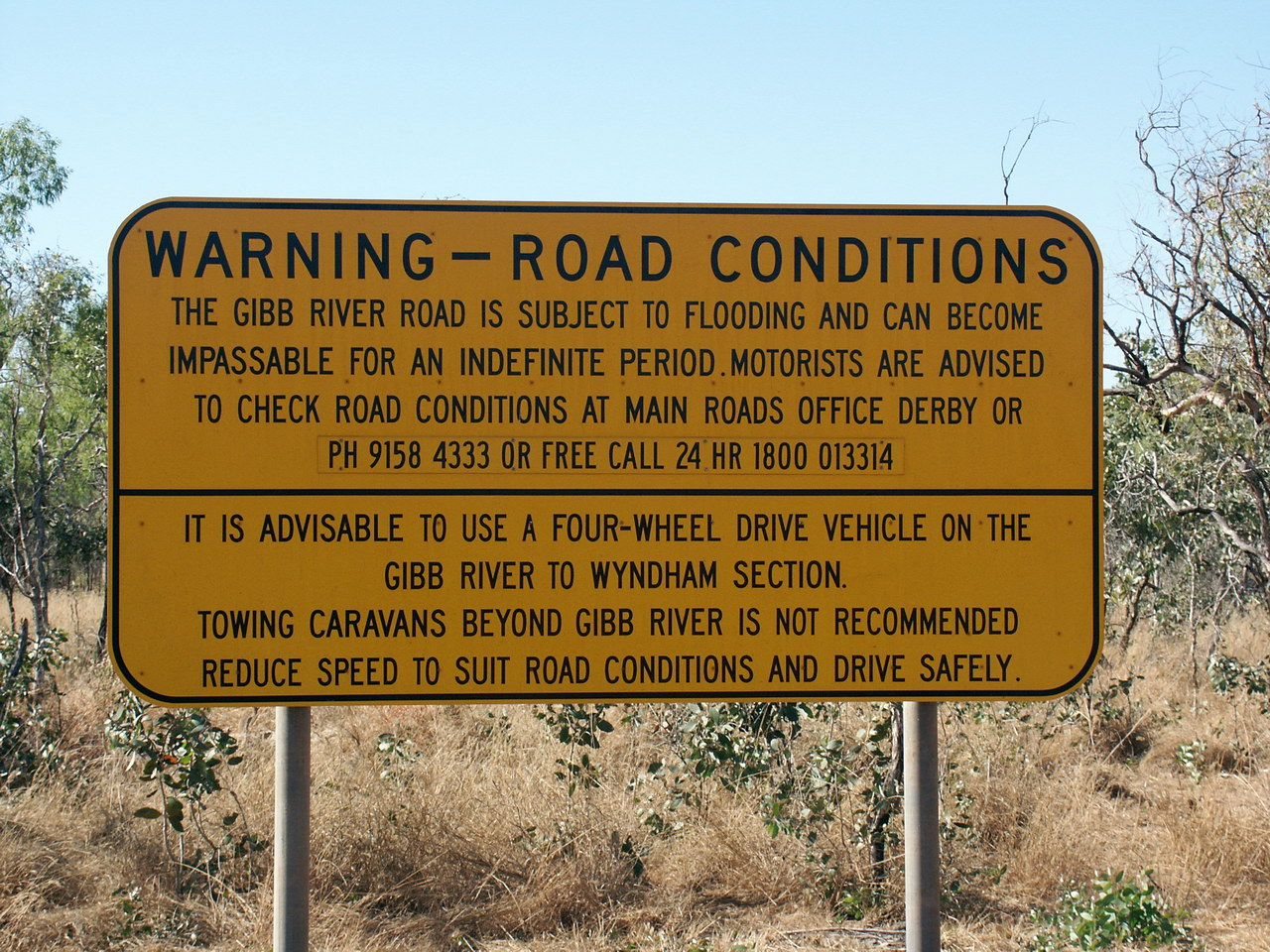
Road sign warning of potentially dangerous conditions ahead

The outback is criss-crossed by historic tracks. Most of the major highways have an excellent bitumen surface and other major roads are usually well-maintained dirt roads.

The Stuart Highway runs from north to south through the centre of the continent, roughly paralleled by the Darwin railway line. There is a proposal to develop some of the roads running from the south-west to the north-east to create an all-weather road named the Outback Highway, crossing the continent diagonally from Laverton, Western Australia (north of Kalgoorlie), through the Northern Territory to Winton, Queensland.

Air transport is relied on for mail delivery in some areas, owing to sparse settlement and wet-season road closures. Most outback mines have an airstrip and many have a fly-in fly-out workforce. Most outback sheep stations and cattle stations have an airstrip and quite a few have their own light plane. Medical and ambulance services are provided by the Royal Flying Doctor Service.

== See also ==
- Australian desert
- Australian landmarks
- Australian outback literature of the 20th century – Overview of 20th century Australian outback literature
- Bushland – Natural ecosystem in Australia
- Central Australia – Region in Australia
- Channel Country – Bioregion in Australia
- Sunraysia – Region of Australia
- Victorian outback – Region of Victoria, Australia
- World Solar Challenge – Solar-powered car race event
