= Cradley, West Midlands =

Village in Dudley, West Midlands, England

Coordinates: 52.460°N 2.086°W

Cradley
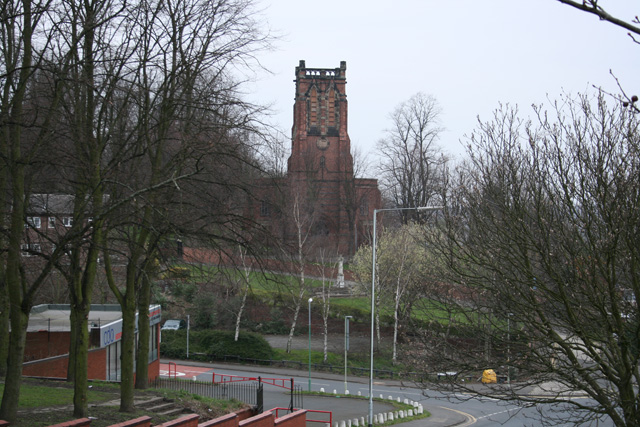
- St Peter's Church

- Location within the West Midlands
- Metropolitan borough: Dudley
- Metropolitan county: West Midlands
- Region: West Midlands
- Country: England
- Sovereign state: United Kingdom
- Post town: HALESOWEN
- Postcode district: B63
- Dialling code: 01384
- Police: West Midlands
- Fire: West Midlands
- Ambulance: West Midlands

Cradley (/ˈkreɪdli/) is a village in the Black Country and Metropolitan Borough of Dudley, in the county of the West Midlands, England, near Halesowen and the banks of the River Stour. Colley Gate is the name of the short road in the centre of Cradley. It was part of the ancient parish of Halesowen, but unlike much of the rest of that parish, which was an exclave of Shropshire, Cradley was always in Worcestershire, until the creation of the West Midlands county in 1974. This meant that for civil administrative purposes, Cradley formerly had the officers which a parish would have had. The population of the appropriate Dudley Ward (Cradley and Wollescote) taken at the 2011 census was 13,340.

There are two villages named Cradley in the Midlands of England although the names are pronounced differently; the "other" Cradley lies about 30 miles to the southwest, near to the Malvern Hills in south Worcestershire, but just across the county boundary in Herefordshire.

In the 19th century a new settlement grew up in heathland on the other side of the river and became known as Cradley Heath. This was in the ancient parish of Rowley Regis. Previously the residents of Cradley had the right to graze their animals on that heath, subject to a small annual payment to the lord of the manor.

== History ==
Withgar, the last of the Saxons, was the last lord to live within the manor. His house, which was very likely on the site of the old "Farther Leys Barn" (Fatherless Barn) was no doubt a timber built structure like a barn, his family living at one end while his servants and ceorls occupied the other where they slept on straw.

Cradley appears in the Domesday Book thus:

CRADELEIE. Pagan holds it under William son of Ansculf. Withgar held it. There is one hide, no part in Demesne, 4 villagers and 11 smallholders with 7 ploughs. The value was 40 shillings; now 24 shillings.

The manor of Cradley was bought and sold over the centuries, and also changed hands as a result of forfeiture and political favours. In 1473, following the forfeiture of it by James Butler, 5th Earl of Ormond, it passed to the Crown, and King Edward IV gave the largest part of it to his Queen. She had built a chapel, dedicated to Erasmus, the Dutch humanist, adjoining the abbey church at Westminster, and endowed it with the manors of Cradley and Hagley, but the manor reverted to Thomas Butler, 7th Earl of Ormond, when the attainder was reversed by Henry VII. In 1564, the 7th Earl's grandson sold it, together with Oldswinford, Hagley and Clent, to Sir John Lyttleton of Frankley. The boundary of Cradley, as re-surveyed in 1733, has remained virtually unchanged ever since.

During the English Civil War, Parliamentary troops were quartered in Cradley.

Renowned typeface designer William Caslon is believed to have been born in Cradley in 1693, although there are those who maintain that he was born in Halesowen.

Cradley was formerly a township and chapelry in the parish of Hales-owen, in 1866 Cradley became a separate civil parish, on 1 April 1974 the parish was abolished. In 1951 the parish had a population of 9846.

=== Religious history ===
In 1770, John Wesley visited Cradley, and wrote:

"Monday, 19, March 1770 – I rode to Cradley (from Wednesbury). Here also the multitude obliged me to stand abroad, although the north wind whistled about my head. About one I took the field to Stourbridge. Many of the hearers were as wild as colts untamed; but the bridle was in their mouths. At six I began in Dudley. The air was as cold as I had almost ever felt, but I trust God warmed many hearts."

The Evangelicals, who had broken away from the established church, built a chapel in Cradley in 1789.

Cradley Chapel Patronage Act 1799
- Act of Parliament
- Parliament of Great Britain
- Long title: An act for settling the right of patronage or presentation of or to the new chapel of Cradley, in that part of the parish of Halesowen which lies in the county and dioesse of Worcester, and for other purposes.
- Citation: 39 Geo. 3. c. lxxii
- Territorial extent: Great Britain

Dates
- Royal assent: 12 July 1799
- Commencement: 12 July 1799 (Note: The Acts of Parliament (Commencement) Act 1793.)

Status: Current legislation

The local Anglican church, St. Peter's, was built by a group of Dissenters who gathered together to form the Independent Congregational Society. However, a special Act of Parliament in 1799 (39 Geo. 3. c. lxxii), passed on 12 July 1799, took St. Peter's into the Church of England.

The Dissenting tradition remained strong, and many local Unitarian, Wesleyan, Methodist and Baptist churches flourished.

=== Industrial history ===
Cradley achieved prominence in the 19th century as a centre of iron chain making, though the most important centre was the adjacent (but distinct) Cradley Heath. The chain was made on a hearth by hammering cut lengths of red-hot wrought iron rod into oval links, one link passing through the next to form a cable. The anchors and chain for the Titanic were made at N. Hingley and Sons, a firm founded in Cradley, but which had moved to nearby Netherton by the time the chain and anchors were made.

Chain making was not the first or only iron trade carried on in Cradley and the neighbouring towns. For hundreds of years nails had been made in the Black Country, and many thousands of men and women were employed in the trade. It was the staple industry until the mid-19th century. Nail making by hand went into decline after the introduction of machine made nails in about 1830 and many nail makers adapted their smithies and forges, and redirected their skills to making chain.

Cradley is less famous for coal mining than chain making, but between 1850 and 1950 the collieries were no less important than the chain works in the local economy and for the legacy they left.

The coal mining and chain making that made Cradley famous are now in the past, and most of the other iron-based trades have declined to a shadow of their former selves.

=== Recent times ===
The legendary football player, Steve Bloomer was born in Bridge Street, Cradley on 20 January 1874 and on 26 July 2002, Morgan Rogers was born in Avon Road, on the former site of the Tanhouse Estate. .

Organisations and publications such as the Black Country Society and The Black Country Bugle keep the name of Cradley well known to thousands of people.

Many local pubs have been demolished in recent years,"The Black Horse" and "The Bulls Head" were both situated in Overend and have made way for private housing. More recently (2008) "The Top Crown" was razed to the ground.

Although Cradley was historically a village in its own right, increasing residential development during the first half of the 20th century has been it swallowed up into Halesowen so it became not only part of the Halesowen Borough, but also part of the town of Halesowen. Cradley's old High Street is located along what is now known as Colley Lane.

A number of pre-1900 homes remain in Cradley, but most of the housing stock dates from after the First World War, and there is a substantial mix of private and council properties.

Buses connect Cradley with Halesowen, Stourbridge and Birmingham. Cradley Heath and Lye railway stations are nearby.

==== Social housing ====
Two large housing development took place in Cradley during the 1960s and 1970s, Tanhouse Estate and Huntington Gardens.

Huntington Gardens was situated in the north of Cradley near the border with Cradley Heath, on the site of poor housing stock that had previously formed New Street, Victoria Street and Little Hill. The estate was completed by 1973 and consisted of 153 maisonettes and flats, as well as four lock-up shops. Residents also had access to garages as well as two sub stations. Some improvements were made to the already-troubled estate in 1988 – these amounted to nothing more than new porches, secured accesses, landscaping, fenced-off gardens and new playgrounds. But these improvements were inadequate for a neighbourhood in terminal decline, and by the end of the 1990s it was one of the worst estates in the West Midlands. Vandalism, graffiti, litter, drug-taking, burglaries and car crime were rife, and these problems had contributed to an increasing number of empty properties on the estate. Demand for properties was low, and by the end of the year 2000, local residents started to work in conjunction with local council officials to try to determine a solution to the estate's plight. A consultation process with residents showed that 80% were in favour of demolition, and within a year all of the residents had been rehoused. Demolition took place in 2003 and the site has since been successfully redeveloped as housing and parkland.

Tanhouse Estate is situated to the south of Cradley adjoining the countryside, and on its completion consisted of several hundred low-rise council homes, several blocks of flats up to three storeys high, two 20-storey tower blocks and a 10-storey block. These homes were popular on their construction due to modern convenience that many of their occupants had never previously experienced, but within 20 years the estate was one of the most notorious in the West Midlands. Many of the homes had fallen into disrepair, and the local area was plagued by drug-taking, theft, vandalism and car crime. The local ambulance crew would refuse to answer calls from houses on the estate unless protected by police, due to a string of vandal attacks on ambulances. Two of the estate's tower blocks were razed to the ground in July 1999, and the site of both blocks has since been developed for housing. The remaining tower block was renovated at around the same time, and the estate's fortunes have since improved.

==== Education ====
William Caslon's name lives on in the local Caslon Primary School that was built after the Second World War.

A secondary modern school was built to serve Cradley in 1939, just before the outbreak of the Second World War, and was named Homer Hill Secondary Modern School. In 1972, however, a reorganisation of education in Halesowen saw the school closed and the buildings occupied by Homer Hill Middle School. This reorganisation saw 5–7 infant, 7–11 junior and 11–16/18 secondary schools replaced by 5–9 first, 9–13 middle and 13–16/18 secondary schools. However, this system was scrapped in September 1982 on the reintroduction of the traditional age ranges in Halesowen. Homer Hill Middle School was consequently closed and reorganised into Cradley High School, an 11–16 comprehensive school. The school was rebuilt between 1987 and 1992, with the fully completed new school being opened on 5 June 1992. It closed 16 years later.

== Notable people ==
- William Caslon (1692/93 – 1766), also known as William Caslon the Elder, was an English typefounder
- Sir Benjamin Hingley, 1st Baronet (1830–1905), ironmaster and Liberal politician
- Steve Bloomer (1874–1938), footballer who played 599 games, including 474 for Derby County F.C. and 23 for England
- Bert Head (1892–1978), trade union leader, chair of the General Federation of Trade Unions (UK)
- Jessy Blackburn (1894–1995), aviation pioneer and one of the first women to fly a British monoplane
- Tony Norris (1917–2005), ornithologist
- Derek Robinson (1927–2017), trade unionist, shop steward within British Leyland, known as "Red Robbo"
