= Anna Hingley =

Anna Hingley (born 1982) is the first woman to ride on horseback across the Australian Outback, which she completed on 5 August 2006. The 3,510 kilometres (2,180 mi) journey was undertaken to raise A$100,000 for Angel Flight, an Australian charity that co-ordinates non-emergency flights for financially and medically needy people.

Hingley and Ostwald met in 2004 while Hingley was travelling from Sydney to Darwin by bus as part of a year-long backpacking tour. Ostwald was driving the bus and their conversation turned to their mutual passion for horses. They decided to perform the trek while visiting Hingley's parents in December 2005.

== Angel Trek ==
Hingley, a veterinary nurse from Stourbridge in the West Midlands, Great Britain, began the journey from Broome in Western Australia on 17 March 2006. She and her boyfriend, John Ostwald, used six Brumby horses that they had caught and tamed through a process of horse whispering before the trek. The pair were assisted in their record-breaking effort with a support truck carrying the spare horses, gear and water tanks. The couple covered an average of 40 kilometres (25 mi) per day.

Travelling with them was the English filmmaker Thomas Guerrier. His documentary, Rode Trip, The Australian Horse Journey, was released in 2009.

The first section of the route followed Outback highways and traversed the top of the Great Sandy Desert before turning into bush roads, tracks and fording rivers. Notable points of interest on the journey were Fitzroy Crossing, Halls Creek, Daguragu, Top Springs, Daly Waters, Borroloola, Doomadgee, Burketown, Normanton, Croydon, Georgetown, Atherton and finally Cairns, Queensland, on 5 August 2006.

== Sources ==
- "Epic ride across outback near end", BBC News, 13 July 2006
- , The Times, 10 July 2006
- "Anna's Outback Challenge", Bromsgrove Advertiser, 19 July 2006]
- Angel Ride website
