= Hart baronets =

Extinct baronetcy in the Baronetage of the United Kingdom

- Escutcheon of the Hart baronets of Kilmoriarty
- Creation date: 1893
- Status: extinct
- Extinction date: 1970
- Motto: Audacter Tolle, Dare to undertake
- Arms: Gules a bend between three fleurs-de-lis in chief and a four-leaved shamrock slipped in base all Or
- Crest: On a mount Vert a hart trippant Proper holding in the mouth a four-leaved shamrock slipped Or
- Supporters: Dexter a dragon (representing a Chinese dragon) Argent charged on the shoulder with a torteau, sinister a peacock close Proper

The Hart baronetcy, of Kilmoriarty in the County of Armagh, was a title in the Baronetage of the United Kingdom. It was created on 17 July 1893 for Sir Robert Hart, Inspector-General of China's Imperial Maritime Customs Service.

The title became extinct on the death of the 3rd Baronet in 1970.

== Hart baronets, of Kilmoriarty (1893) ==
- Sir Robert Hart, 1st Baronet (1835–1911)
- Sir Edgar Bruce Hart, 2nd Baronet (1873–1963)
- Sir Robert Hart, 3rd Baronet (1918–1970)

Baronetage of the United Kingdom
Preceded by Pulley baronets	Hart baronets of Kilmoriarty; 17 July 1893	Succeeded by Hingley baronets
