= Hingley baronets =

Extinct baronetcy in the Baronetage of the United Kingdom

The Hingley baronetcy, of Cradley in the Parish of Halesowen in the County of Worcester, was a title in the Baronetage of the United Kingdom. It was created on 8 August 1893 for the ironmaster and Liberal politician Benjamin Hingley, with remainder in default of male issue of his own to the male issue of his late brother Hezekiah Hingley.

He was succeeded according to the special remainder by his nephew, the 2nd Baronet, eldest son of Hezekiah Hingley. On the latter's death in 1918 the title became extinct.

== Hingley baronets, of Hatherton Lodge (1893) ==
- Sir Benjamin Hingley, 1st Baronet (1830–1905)
- Sir George Benjamin Hingley, 2nd Baronet (1850–1918)

Baronetage of the United Kingdom
Preceded by Hart baronets	Hingley baronets of Hatherton Lodge; 8 August 1893	Succeeded by Ingram baronets
