= Audrey Brettle =

- Born: Alexandra Audrey Kinnon; 10 February 1937; Rowley Regis, Staffordshire, England
- Died: 27 September 2003 (aged 66); Nuneaton, Warwickshire, England
- Writing career
- Pen name: Amy Thomas

Alexandra Audrey Brettle (1937–2003), was a Black Country author of Scottish descent.

== Biography ==
Educated at Halesowen Grammar School, she became a Salvation Army officer; before working for North Warwickshire Borough Council until her retirement.

In retirement, she began to write actively, and was a founder of the North Warwickshire Writers Group. After her death in 2003, her ashes were interred in Greenhaven Woodland Burial Ground. A collection of her writings was published posthumously, under the title The Clydebank Whistle.
