= Cleansing Service Group =

UK waste management company

- Type: Private
- Industry: Waste Management
- Founded: 1934, Hampshire, United Kingdom
- Founder: Edgar Hart
- Headquarters: Whiteley, Hampshire, United Kingdom
- Number of locations: 32 (September 2026)
- Area served: United Kingdom
- Key people: Neil Richards (Chairman), Jennifer Richards (Managing Director)
- Revenue: £120million (2025)
- Number of employees: 657 (2026)
- Website: www.csg.co.uk

Cleansing Service Group is a privately owned waste management company in the United Kingdom. It provides services in the collection, treatment, recycling and disposal of numerous waste streams from 32 locations throughout the UK. In December 2023, CSG were named as the 43rd-largest privately owned company, based in the Solent region.

== History ==
Edgar 'Bunny' Hart founded Hampshire Cleansing Service in 1934, having purchased a Dennis tanker from Wokingham Rural District Council for £5 and acquired an operator’s licence to empty cesspits. He opened a depot at Botley, Hampshire (which the company still uses today) and quickly expanded the business, becoming a contractor for several local councils. By the outbreak of the Second World War in 1939, Hart had six tankers on the road, specialising in domestic sewage and night soil collections from septic tanks, cesspits and cesspools.

Wartime brought with it several opportunities for HCS. Sewage removal work was classified as an essential war service, which meant the company was not affected by conscription of its workers or subjected to fuel rationing. Furthermore, a number of army camps became established in the region, increasing the amount of sewage which needed to be transported and the sewage itself was in greater demand, as a more economic alternative to fertilisers. At its peak wartime operation, the company’s fleet had risen to 20 tankers and 15 bucket collection vehicles and its workforce to 100.

After the war, the company grew through diversification and wider geographical spread. Hampshire Cleansing Service changed its name in 1954, to become Cleansing Services (Southern Counties) Ltd.

A veteran of the First World War, Bunny Hart was keenly opposed to the proliferation of nuclear weapons and supported the annual Aldermaston Marches of the late 1950s and early 1960s by cleaning waste from the marches at cost price.

The 1960s saw further growth, with the establishment of a tank-cleaning division and numerous competitor acquisitions leading to the company becoming described as the Cleansing Services Group, a name which survives today as CSG. Also during the sixties, CSG became pioneers in the South with the Front End Loader – a tool now common place within the waste industry.

In 1971, Bunny Hart died, after a long illness, expressing a firm wish that the company should remain owned and controlled by the Hart family. In accordance with his wishes, his eldest daughter, Heather, was appointed as his successor.

On 24 February 1972, an event took place which was to define the very future of the waste industry – an event in which CSG played a central role. 36 drums of sodium cyanide ash were found, dumped near a children’s playground in Nuneaton, Warwickshire. A CSG subsidiary was called in to remove the drums. The following day, as the incident was being debated in Parliament, the material was being safely processed at CSG’s Botley headquarters. The fact that a major loss of life had been so narrowly avoided forced the Government to examine rogue tipping practices that were prevalent in the UK waste industry at the time. Within weeks, the Government passed the Disposal of Poisonous Waste Act (1972), which became the precursor to much of today’s UK Hazardous waste legislation.

In the intervening years, CSG have continues to diversify, through acquisition and natural expansion, in order to exploit the opportunities brought about by the increasing legislation of waste management.

== Operations ==
CSG operate a number of different facilities across a variety of sites across the UK, across a number of sectors of the waste industry. In addition to domestic sewage handling and other wet waste operations, CSG now operate their own sewage treatment plants in Worcester. A number of hazardous waste streams are treated at their site at Cadishead, near Manchester, with waste oil being treated and processed at a number of locations around the UK. CSG operate a printing materials recycling plant in Dorset and even a waste oil collection vessel, the Erimus Star, based on the Tees at Middlesbrough.

== Corporate social responsibility ==
Since Bunny Hart’s assistance to the Aldermaston Marches in the 1950s, CSG have always sought to be involved in a number of initiatives that seek to benefit the communities in which they operate. Funds and Management time are donated to a wide range of activities, including the Bourne Community Farm in Salisbury, Wiltshire, a number of amateur and junior sports teams and a Trust dedicated to improving the IT skills of nearby residents.

The Margaret Hart Trust

Since 1976, CSG has operated a trust in the name of Bunny Hart’s wife. The trust was designed to provide assistance to retired employees or any current or former employee financially disadvantaged by health problems. It's believed to be a unique feature of a privately owned company of CSG’s size.

== Other Activities ==
CSG was the subject of Waste Matters: A History of Cleansing Service Group (ISBN 978-0907383840), a 2002 book by Nigel Watson, examining the history of the company. The text was updated in 2017, entitled The Hart of Waste (ISBN 978-1781258200).

CSG have interests in a broad range of activities across the waste sector. In 2008, CSG acquired J&G Environmental, the largest print waste company in the UK and a major recycler of aluminium. In 2015, the group acquired Willacy Oil Services, specialists for many years in industrial cleaning, oil refinery services and the manufacture of specialist automated tank cleaning equipment, along with the Oilmonster waste oil collection brand.

== Awards ==
In 2010, Cleansing Service Group ranked 24th in The Sunday Times Profit Track 100 listing which ranks the UK's top 100 private firms with the fastest growing profits. This saw a leap of 36 places from 60th position in 2009.

== Controversy ==
In October 2000 an explosion at the company's site in Sandhurst, Gloucestershire resulted in a record £250,000 fine after it was found the company had been storing illegal and dangerous chemicals.

== See also ==
- Waste management
- List of waste management companies
- List of solid waste treatment technologies
