= Noah Hingley =

English industrialist (1796–1877)

- Born: 7 March 1796
- Died: 21 October 1877 (aged 81)
- Resting place: St John the Baptist Church, Halesowen
- Occupation: Ironmaster

Noah Hingley (1796–1877) was an English industrialist from the Black Country region of the United Kingdom. He started making chain near the village of Cradley. He founded the firm N. Hingley & Sons in 1838 which became a large scale manufacturer of anchors and chains with large works on the Dudley No. 2 Canal at Netherton. He became Mayor of Dudley in 1869 and stood unsuccessfully for parliament in 1874.

== Biography ==
Noah Hingley was born on 7 March 1796. According to one source he was born in Cradley Heath, a then sparsely populated area in the Parish of Rowley Regis. His parents were Isaac and Ester Hingley. The family was of local origin and his mother was described as "intelligent and pious" and a "regular communicant at Rowley Church". He worked with his father at a forge near Cradley. According to an obituary of one of his sons: "Noah Hingley was proud to acknowledge that he was born a poor man, and sprang from the ranks of the working-classes, he and his father before him having plied the craft of chain-making in a small factory on the banks of the Stour." In his own obituary, written in a local paper, it was stated that he attended a school in Reddal Hill until the death of his mother and that he commenced business before the age of 20, travelling with a packhorse selling nails made at the family forge.

His first marriage was to Sarah Willett, the daughter of Noah Willett of Coalbournbrook, Kingswinford on 25 December 1814.

In 1820 he started making chain cable for ships after winning an order from a Liverpool shipowner. The size of the chain (made from 1.5 inch diameter bar) was unusually large for that time and Hingley's success in its manufacture has led to him being credited with bringing the chain cable industry into the Black Country district.

His first wife died in 1832 and in the following year he married Anne Linton Wittington

In November 1833, his name appeared in a case to be heard at the Court for Relief of Insolvent Debtors, in Lancaster. He was stated to be living at Mill Street, Toxteth-Park, Liverpool at the time.

In 1838 he set up the firm N. Hingley & Sons.

In 1850, Noah Hingley was listed in a Post Office directory as living at Colley Gate, Cradley.

The firm moved to Netherton in 1852 where large scale anchor and chain works were constructed.

In addition to being an industrialist and employer, Noah Hingley was a philanthropist supporting education, religion and poor relief in his locality. He was instrumental in the setting up of ragged schools in the Cradley area.

Noah Hingley became one of the Councillors for the Netherton Ward in the newly incorporated Municipal Borough of Dudley in 1865. He subsequently became Mayor of Dudley in 1869 and stood as Parliamentary candidate for Dudley in 1874, losing to the long-established sitting candidate Henry Brinsley Sheridan.

Noah Hingley's second wife, Ann, died on 9 October 1871.

He died on 21 October 1877 at Hatherton Lodge in Cradley and was buried at St John the Baptist Church, Halesowen. According to Dudley chronicler, C. F. G. Clark: "The death of this good old gentleman, in 1877, drew the tears of sincere regret from thousands of the working classes of this neighbourhood; and the public funeral, which was accorded to his remains, witnessed one of the largest gatherings of respectably dressed, sorrowful men, women, and children, that ever assembled on any occasion to pay their last mark of regard to real departed worth. The Mayor and Corporation of Dudley attended these obsequies in public procession; Mr. Hingley being an Alderman of the Borough, and in 1870-1 its esteemed mayor."

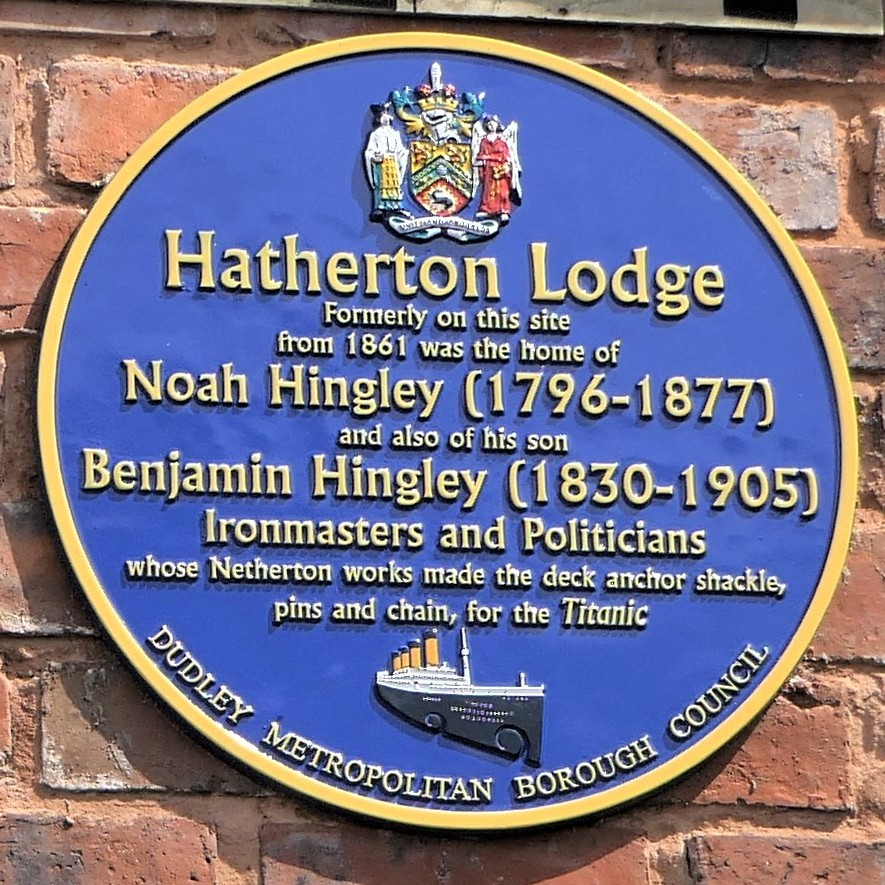
Blue Plaque at Hatherton Lodge

His firm carried on, however, firstly under the leadership of his son Benjamin Hingley and then, later, his grandchildren.

A blue plaque on the site of Hatherton Lodge commemorates Noah and Benjamin.
