= Benjamin Hingley =

English ironmaster and Liberal politician

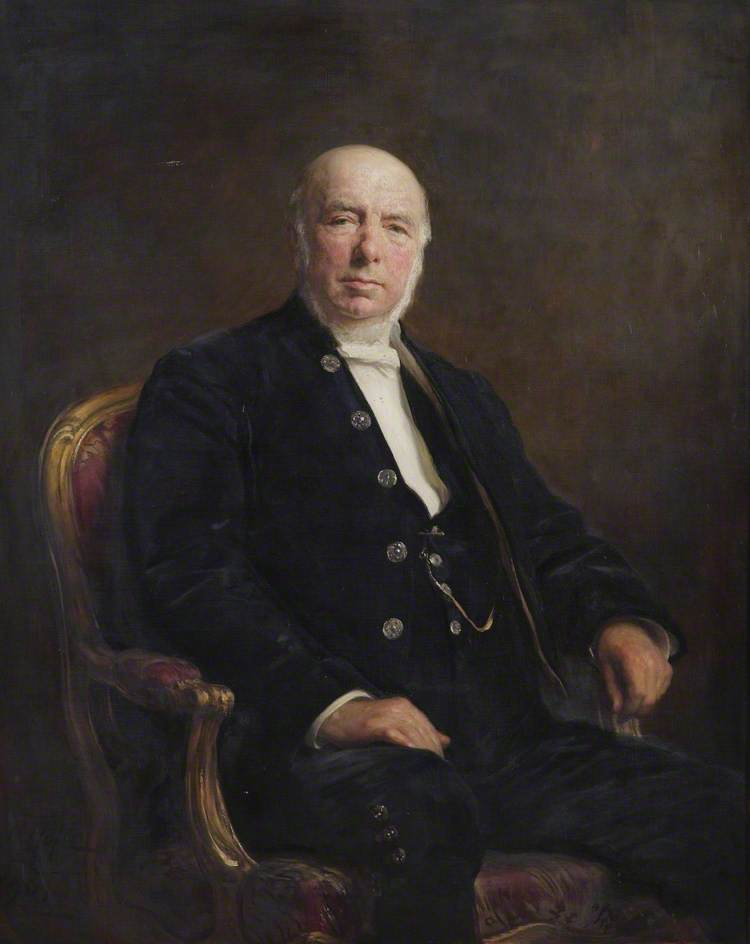
Sir Benjamin Hingley as painted by Arthur Stockdale Cope

Sir Benjamin Hingley, 1st Baronet, DL (11 September 1830 – 13 May 1905) was an English ironmaster, and Liberal and Liberal Unionist politician who sat in the House of Commons from 1885 to 1895.

== Life ==
Hingley was born at Cradley, Worcestershire, the son of Noah Hingley and his first wife Sarah Willett. He was educated at Halesowen Grammar School. He entered the family firms of Noah Hingley and Sons chain and anchor manufacturers and Hingley and Smith colliery proprietors. Hingley and Company had Iron Works at Netherton and Old Hill which were supplied with coal from two small mines at Dudley Wood and Primrose Hill. In 1865 on the death of his brother Hezekiah, he became head of the firms. He was Chairman of the South Staffordshire and East Worcestershire Ironmasters Association. He was also president of the Midland Iron and Steel Wages Board and of the South Staffordshire Coal Trade Wages Board.

Hingley was elected as the Member of Parliament (MP) for North Worcestershire at the 1885 general election. He became a Liberal Unionist in 1886 but reverted to the Liberals in 1892, and held the seat until the 1895 general election when he retired through ill-health. He was also an alderman of Dudley and Mayor of Dudley from 1887 to 1889 and county alderman for Staffordshire from 1889 to 1892. He was created a baronet on 8 August 1893. Hingley was also a J.P. for Dudley, Worcestershire and Staffordshire. He became High Sheriff of Worcestershire in 1900, and a deputy lieutenant of the county that summer. In 1903, he was elected president of the Mining Association of Great Britain.

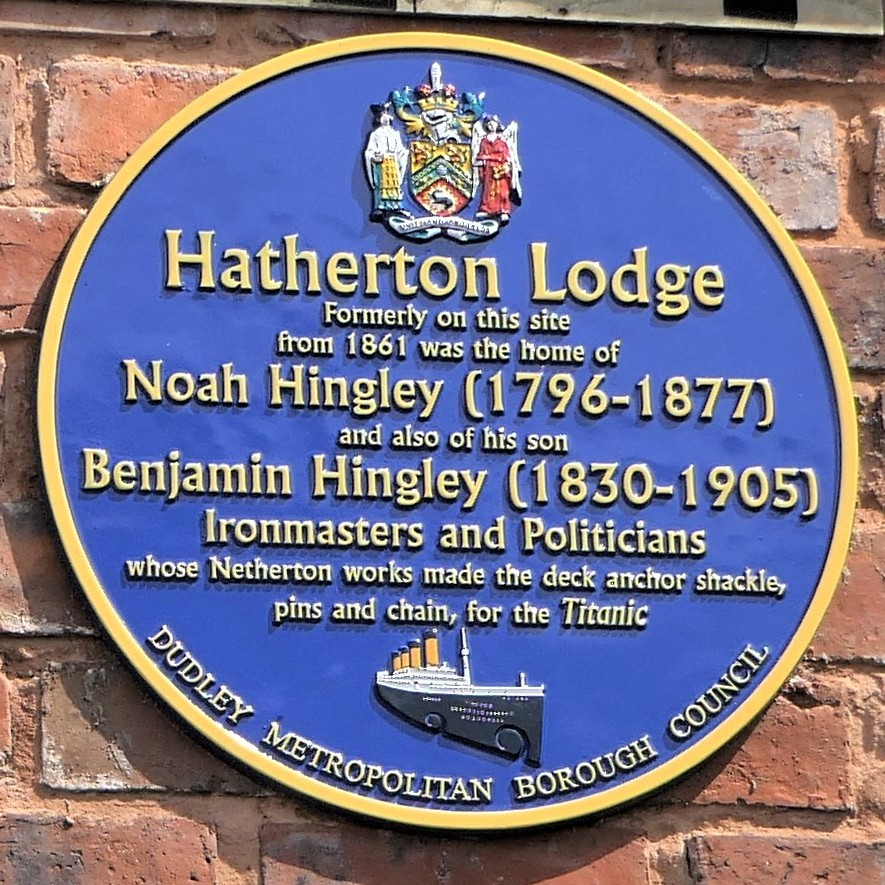
Blue Plaque at Hatherton Lodge

Hingley lived at Hatherton Lodge, Cradley, where he died on 13 May 1905, and was buried at Halesowen Church Yard. He was succeeded in the baronetcy by his nephew, George Benjamin Hingley. A blue plaque on the site of Hatherton Lodge commemorates Noah and Benjamin.

Hingley laid the foundation stone for the Methodist Church in Birmingham Street, which has since been converted to a bar and restaurant called "Benjamin's".

== Notes ==
Parliament of the United Kingdom
New constituency see West Worcestershire	Member of Parliament for North Worcestershire; 1885 – 1895	Succeeded by John William Wilson
Baronetage of the United Kingdom
New creation	Baronet (of Hatherton Lodge); 1893–1905	Succeeded by George Benjamin Hingley
Honorary titles
Preceded by Charles Wilson Dyson Perrins	High Sheriff of Worcestershire; 1900 – 1901	Succeeded by Sir Henry Foley Lambert
