= Michael Bradley (cricketer) =

English cricketer

Cricket information
- Batting: Right-handed
- Bowling: Slow left arm orthodox

Career statistics
Competition	First-class
Matches	9
Runs scored	9
Batting average	4.50
100s/50s	0/0
Top score	6*
Balls bowled	1,485
Wickets	23
Bowling average	37.69
5 wickets in innings	0
10 wickets in match	0
Best bowling	6/162
Catches/stumpings	0/–
- Source: CricInfo, 14 April 2023

Michael Ewart Bradley (born 29 March 1934) is an English former cricketer who played nine first-class games for Worcestershire in the early 1950s. He was born in Halesowen and attended Halesowen Grammar School.

Bradley made his debut against Combined Services at Worcester in June 1951, and though he did not bowl in the first innings, he claimed 3–84 in the second; his third wicket was that of Jim Parks. A couple of weeks later he played against Scotland and took five wickets in the match. In the second innings of this game Hugo Yarnold stumped six Scottish batsmen — this remains a first-class record — and Bradley took two of those wickets. (Yarnold also caught another man in the same innings off Bradley's bowling.)

In 1952 Bradley appeared seven times for Worcestershire, taking 15 wickets in all, but at an expensive average of 49.73, with six of those successes coming in a single stint against Nottinghamshire in June: in Notts' only innings, his final analysis was 63.3-20-162-6. Aside from this, only in his first game of the season (against Oxford University) did he take more than one wicket in any innings, and he bowed out of the first-class game with a return of 20-0-80-0 against Middlesex in early July.
