= 2004 Birmingham Hodge Hill by-election =

UK parliamentary by-election

- 15 July 2004
- Turnout: 37.9% (▼10.0%)
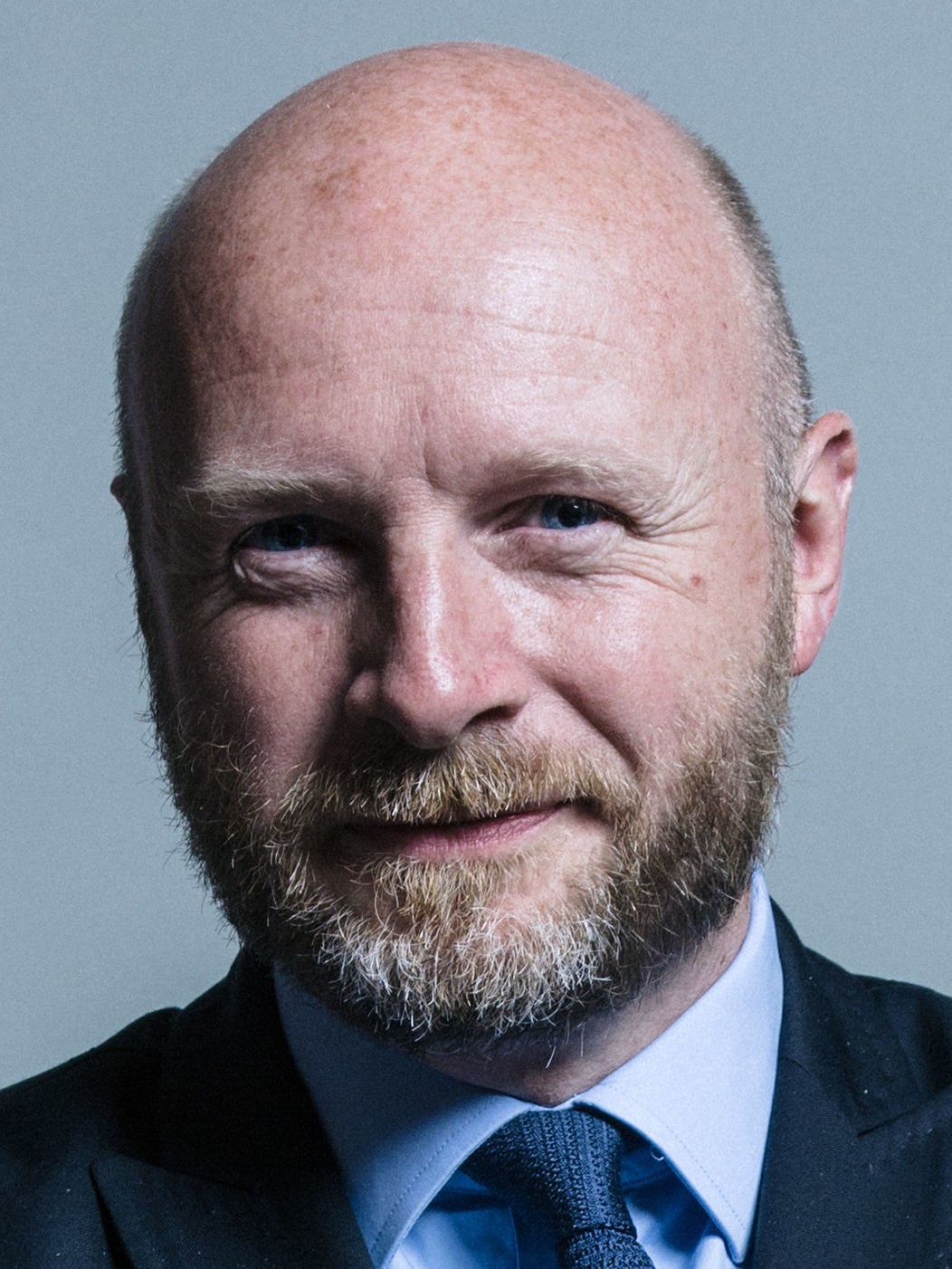

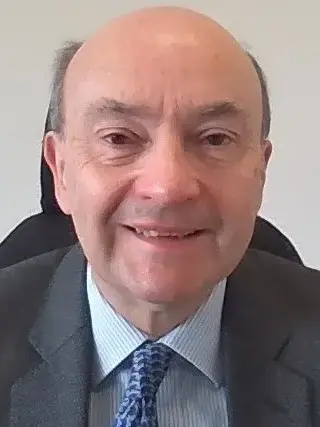

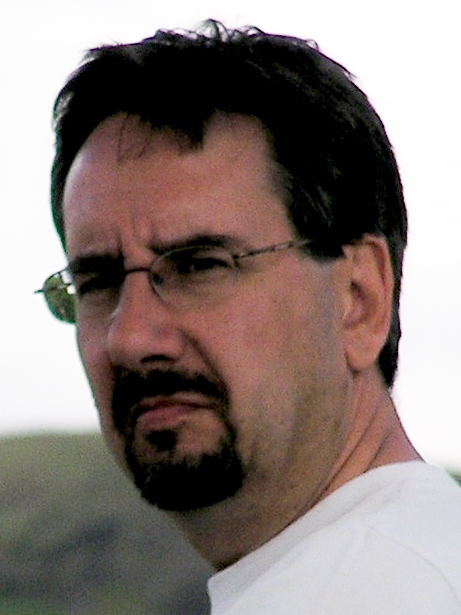
	First party	Second party
		LD
Candidate	Liam Byrne	Nicola Davies
Party	Labour	Liberal Democrats
Popular vote	7,451	6,991
Percentage	36.5%	34.2%
Swing	▼27.4%	▲26.1%
	Third party	Fourth party
Candidate	Stephen Eyre	John Rees
Party	Conservative	Respect
Popular vote	3,543	1,282
Percentage	17.3%	6.3%
Swing	▼2.7%	New
MP before election
Terry Davis
Labour
Elected MP
Liam Byrne
Labour

A by-election for the United Kingdom parliamentary constituency of Birmingham Hodge Hill was held on 15 July 2004, called following the resignation of incumbent Labour Party Member of Parliament (MP) Terry Davis. Liam Byrne held the seat for Labour, albeit with a vastly reduced majority of 460 votes, narrowly holding off the Liberal Democrat candidate Nicola Davies.

The by-election was held on the same day as the 2004 Leicester South by-election, which saw Labour lose the seat to the Liberal Democrats on a 21% swing.

== Background ==
Incumbent MP Terry Davis resigned on 22 June 2004 following his appointment as Secretary General of the Council of Europe.

Birmingham Hodge Hill has had a Labour MP since the 1950 general election, the only break being a Conservative Party victory at a 1977 by-election for the Birmingham Stechford constituency, which returned to Labour at the 1979 general election.

== Campaign ==
The by-election was heavily contested by the Labour Party and the Liberal Democrats, with both parties alleging "dirty tricks" by the other. Liam Byrne's campaign team, led by West Bromwich East MP Tom Watson, produced leaflets with slogans such as "Labour is on your side, the Lib Dems are on the side of failed asylum seekers." Another flier stated: "While Labour were tough the Lib Dems were wimps—they tried to stop us taking away benefits from failed asylum seekers and they voted against plans to speed up deportations."

Meanwhile, the Lib Dems reminded voters of Labour's decision to invade Iraq the previous year and, in the constituency's predominantly Muslim Washwood Heath ward, produced a leaflet carrying a picture of Charles Kennedy and Nicola Davies surrounded by South Asian voters.

During the campaign, Labour pledged to "smash teen gangs" and create "yob-free zones". Domestic issues such as schools, hospitals and crime also featured prominently.

== Result ==
At the by-election, the seat was retained by Labour, but with a vastly reduced majority of only 460 votes. The Lib Dems narrowed the gap with a 26.7% swing, which at the time was the eleventh largest in United Kingdom by-election history.

2004 by-election: Birmingham Hodge Hill
Party	Candidate	Votes	%	±%
Labour	Liam Byrne	7,451	36.5	−27.4
Liberal Democrats	Nicola Davies	6,991	34.2	+26.1
Conservative	Stephen Eyre	3,543	17.3	−2.7
Respect	John Rees	1,282	6.3	N/A
National Front	Jim Starkey	805	3.9	N/A
English Democrat	Mark Wheatley	277	1.4	N/A
Christian Vote	George Hargreaves	90	0.4	N/A
Majority		460	2.3	−41.6
Turnout		20,439	37.9	−10.0
Labour hold		Swing		

== Previous result ==
2001 general election: Birmingham Hodge Hill
Party	Candidate	Votes	%	±%
Labour	Terry Davis	16,901	63.9	−1.7
Conservative	Debbie Lewis	5,283	20.0	−4.0
Liberal Democrats	Charles Dow	2,147	8.1	−0.4
BNP	Lee Windridge	889	3.3	N/A
People's Justice	Perwaz Hussain	561	2.1	N/A
Socialist Labour	Dennis Cridge	284	1.1	N/A
UKIP	Harvey Vivian	275	1.0	−0.9
Muslim Party	Ayub Khan	125	0.5	N/A
Majority		11,618	43.9	+2.3
Turnout		26,465	47.9	−13.0
Labour hold		Swing		

== Aftermath ==
Some senior Labour strategists saw the election, as well as the one in Leicester South that took place the same day, as among the worst by-election results ever for Labour. They pointed out that the Lib Dems would very likely have won in Birmingham Hodge Hill were it not for the Respect Party, who secured some of the anti-Iraq War vote. Charles Kennedy agreed, pinpointing anger about the war as a critical factor in his party's success. He said, "The story of the night is of two-party politics in the cities - the Liberal Democrats versus Labour."

The Independent's Editorial on 17 July stated: "If the prime minister had hoped for 'closure' on Iraq following the Butler Committee report, the voters of Birmingham and Leicester have told him in no uncertain terms that he won't get it. Of course Iraq and the failure to find WMDs are not the only reasons for the anti-Blair vote so dramatically demonstrated in these two by-elections. The state of public services and local concerns also played a part. Nor should anything detract from the achievement of the Liberal Democrats...The Lib Dem leader, Charles Kennedy, had every right to declare as the results came in that this was 'no flash in the pan' ... The fact is that, in these two votes, as in other recent results, the Lib Dems have shown that they can unseat a ruling Labour majority as much as a Tory one."

The Daily Mirror's Editorial stated: "It isn't often that defeat can leave you smiling, but Tony Blair must have been grinning all over his face [on Friday]. The night before Labour had lost one safe seat to the Lib Dems and only clung on to another by a few hundred votes. Yet what could have been a by-election disaster was not. For it was a catastrophe for [Conservative Party leader] Michael Howard. The Tories crawled in a poor third in both elections ... The voters of Leicester South and Birmingham Hodge Hill confirmed what the polls are saying - the British people have had enough of the Tories."
