= 1977 Birmingham Stechford by-election =

UK parliamentary by-election

← Oct. 1974	31 March 1977	1979 →

Constituency of Birmingham Stechford
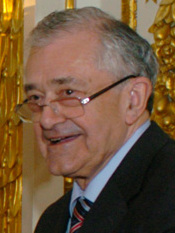
	First party	Second party
	Con
Candidate	Andrew MacKay	Terry Davis
Party	Conservative	Labour
Popular vote	15,731	13,782
Percentage	43.4%	38.0%
Swing	▲15.6%	▼19.6%
	Third party	Fourth party
	NF	Lib
Candidate	Andrew Brons	Graham Gopsill
Party	National Front	Liberal
Popular vote	2,955	2,901
Percentage	8.2%	8.0%
Swing	New	▼6.4%
MP before election
Roy Jenkins
Labour
Elected MP
Andrew MacKay
Conservative

The 1977 Birmingham Stechford by-election, in Birmingham, on 31 March 1977 was held after Labour Member of Parliament (MP) Roy Jenkins resigned his seat following his appointment as President of the European Commission. A seat that had been solidly Labour since its formation in 1950, it was won by Andrew MacKay of the Conservative Party, before being regained by Labour in 1979. The by-election was noted for the strong performance of the National Front candidate and the presence of two far left candidates.

== Background ==
As a leading Labour sitting MP Roy Jenkins had hoped to become Foreign Secretary in the government of James Callaghan but was overlooked in favour of Anthony Crosland. Following this Jenkins was nominated as President of the European Commission in succession to François-Xavier Ortoli, a move which necessitated his departure from Parliament.

== Candidates ==
With the seat being solid Labour Party territory the by-election presented the possibility of a return to Parliament for Terry Davis, who had served as member for the defunct Bromsgrove seat from a by-election in 1971 until its abolition in 1974. Davis however failed to take the seat and began a pattern for the ailing Labour government who also lost the next by-election in Ashfield when David Marquand followed Jenkins to a role in the Commission.

It also left the governing Labour Party without a majority and resulted in a vote of no confidence being issued, although the government won and was able to cling onto power by forming a pact with the Liberals.

The Conservative candidate Andrew MacKay won the election with a majority of nearly 2,000, although ultimately he would only hold the seat until 1979 when it was regained for Labour. MacKay would go on to enjoy a long parliamentary career representing a number of constituencies.

The Liberal Party candidate was Graham Gopsill, a Birmingham councillor who finished the by-election in a lowly fourth place. Gopsill would later serve the Liberal Democrats in Droitwich Spa until his death in 2009. He was beaten into fourth by National Front candidate Andrew Brons, a veteran of a number of far right movements and member of the NF National Directorate who eventually became NF chairman in 1980. Other candidates to appear on the ballot were leftists Brian Heron of the International Marxist Group and journalist Paul Foot for the Socialist Workers Party.

== Result ==
Birmingham Stechford by-election, 1977
Party	Candidate	Votes	%	±%
Conservative	Andrew MacKay	15,731	43.4	+15.6
Labour	Terry Davis	13,782	38.0	−19.6
National Front	Andrew Brons	2,955	8.2	New
Liberal	Graham Gopsill	2,901	8.0	−6.6
International Marxist	Brian Heron	494	1.4	New
Socialist Workers	Paul Foot	377	1.0	New
Majority		1,949	5.4	N/A
Turnout		36,240		
Conservative gain from Labour		Swing		

== Previous result ==
General election October 1974: Birmingham Stechford
Party	Candidate	Votes	%	±%
Labour	Roy Jenkins	23,075	57.6	+4.5
Conservative	D. Wedgwood	11,152	27.8	−2.4
Liberal	Graham Gopsill	5,860	14.6	−1.4
Majority		11,923	29.8	+6.8
Turnout		40,087	64.1	−8.0
Labour hold		Swing		
