= Tuckwell =

Tuckwell is a surname. Notable people with the surname include:

- Barry Tuckwell AC, OBE (1931–2020), Australian horn player
- Bertie Tuckwell (1882–1943), New Zealand cricketer
- Gertrude Tuckwell (1861–1951), British trade unionist, social worker and author
- Patricia Tuckwell, Countess of Harewood (1926–2018), Australian violinist and fashion model
- Stephen Tuckwell GC, (1897–1966), awarded the George Cross for bomb disposal work during the Blitz
- Steve Tuckwell (born 1968), British politician
- William Tuckwell (1829–1919), Victorian clergyman well known on political platforms
- Zoe Tuckwell-Smith, Australian actress
