= Terry Davis (politician) =

British politician (1938–2024)

The Right Honourable Terry Davis CMG
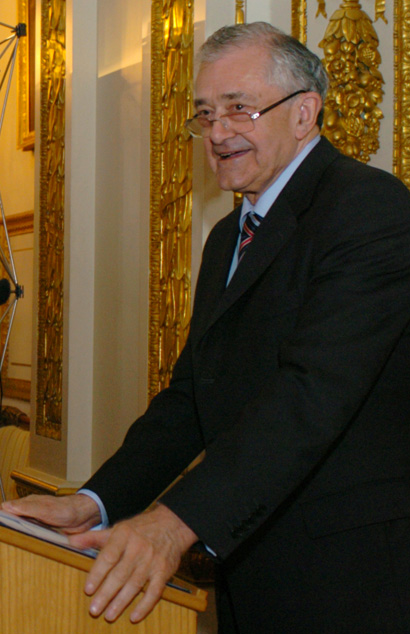
- Davis in 2009

Secretary General of the Council of Europe
- In office 1 September 2004 – 1 September 2009
- Preceded by: Walter Schwimmer
- Succeeded by: Maud de Boer-Buquicchio (Acting)

Member of Parliament
- In office 3 May 1979 – 22 June 2004
- Preceded by: Andrew MacKay
- Succeeded by: Liam Byrne
- Constituency: Birmingham Stechford (1979–1983); Birmingham Hodge Hill (1983–2004)
- In office 27 May 1971 – 8 February 1974
- Preceded by: James Dance
- Succeeded by: Constituency abolished
- Constituency: Bromsgrove

Personal details
- Born: Terence Anthony Gordon Davis; 5 January 1938 Stourbridge, England
- Died: 9 December 2024 (aged 86)
- Party: Labour
- Education: University College London (LLB); University of Michigan (MBA)

Terence Anthony Gordon Davis CMG PC (5 January 1938 – 9 December 2024) was a British Labour Party politician and businessman. He was the Member of Parliament (MP) for Bromsgrove from 1971 to 1974, and for Birmingham Stechford and its successor seat, Birmingham Hodge Hill, from 1979 to 2004. He was then Secretary General of the Council of Europe from 2004 to 2009.

== Early life ==
Davis was born in Stourbridge on 5 January 1938. He went to the King Edward VI Grammar School (now the King Edward VI College) in Stourbridge.

Davis was a graduate of University College London, where he gained an LLB degree in 1962, and University of Michigan's Ross School of Business, where he gained an MBA degree in 1962. He was a company executive from 1962 to 1971 for Esso, Clarks shoes and Chrysler Parts. From 1974 to 1979, he was a manager in the motor industry, with Leyland Cars.

== Political career ==
Davis joined the Labour Party in 1965. He was elected to Yeovil Rural District Council, representing the village ward of Long Load, in 1967, in what was the first-ever contested election for the ward.

At the 1970 general election, Davis stood unsuccessfully in the Conservative-held Bromsgrove constituency, finishing second of two candidates with 41.5% of the vote. The sitting MP, James Dance, died the following year, and Davis won the resulting by-election.

The Bromsgrove constituency was abolished in boundary changes for the February 1974 general election, and in the new Bromsgrove and Redditch constituency, Davis lost to the Conservative Hal Miller. He stood again at the October 1974 general election and lost again. At the 1979 election, his wife Anne contested the seat for Labour and lost by a much larger margin.

In 1977, Birmingham Stechford Labour MP, Roy Jenkins, was appointed President of the European Commission, and Davis was selected as the Labour candidate in the by-election. He lost by 1,949 votes to the Conservative Andrew MacKay, but at the 1979 general election, he won the seat with a majority of 1,649.

The Stechford constituency was abolished in boundary changes for the 1983 general election, and Davis was re-elected in the successor constituency of Birmingham Hodge Hill. He held that seat until his retirement from the House of Commons 21 years later.

In 2004 he was elected Secretary General of the Council of Europe, and announced his intention to stand down from the UK parliament by applying for the Stewardship of the Chiltern Hundreds. The resulting by-election was held on 15 July and won by Labour's Liam Byrne. He left the Council of Europe on 31 August 2009. He was appointed Companion of the Order of St Michael and St George (CMG) in the 2010 New Year Honours.

Wikileaks "cablegate" revelations disclosed that the US, unhappy about his criticisms of the US's rendition program, regarded him as an "unpopular lame duck".

== Personal life and death ==
Davis married Anne Cooper in 1963. They had a son and daughter. Davis died on 9 December 2024, at the age of 86.

Parliament of the United Kingdom
Preceded by James Dance	Member of Parliament for Bromsgrove; 1971–Feb 1974	Constituency abolished
Preceded by Andrew MacKay	Member of Parliament for Birmingham Stechford; 1979–1983	Constituency abolished
New constituency	Member of Parliament for Birmingham Hodge Hill; 1983–2004	Succeeded by Liam Byrne
Political offices
Preceded by Walter Schwimmer	Secretary General of the Council of Europe; 1 September 2004 – 31 August 2009	Succeeded by Maud de Boer-Buquicchio; Acting
