= James Dance =

British politician

Member of Parliament for Bromsgrove
- In office 26 May 1955 – 16 March 1971
- Preceded by: Michael Higgs
- Succeeded by: Terry Davis

Personal details
- Born: James Cyril Aubrey George Dance; 5 May 1907
- Died: 16 March 1971 (aged 63)
- Party: Conservative
- Spouse(s): Charlote Strutt; Anne Walker
- Children: 4
- Education: Eton College

Military service
- Branch/service: British Army
- Unit: 2nd Dragoon Guards (Queen's Bays)
- Battles/wars: World War II

James Cyril Aubrey George Dance (5 May 1907 – 16 March 1971) was a British Conservative Party politician. He was educated at Eton College and was in the 2nd Dragoon Guards (Queen's Bays) during World War II. He was an insurance underwriter for Lloyd's of London.

Dance was elected as Member of Parliament for Bromsgrove at the 1955 general election. He was the parliamentary private secretary to George Ward during Ward's time as Parliamentary and Financial Secretary to the Admiralty and Secretary of State for Air. Dance remained an MP until he died in office on 16 March 1971, at the age of 63. The resulting by-election was won by the Labour Party's Terry Davis.

Dance was married to Charlotte Strutt until her death; they had one child. He then remarried, to Anne Walker, and they had three children.

Parliament of the United Kingdom
Preceded by Michael Higgs	Member of Parliament for Bromsgrove; 1955–1971	Succeeded by Terry Davis
