= Birmingham Hodge Hill =

UK Parliament constituency (1983–2024)

- Former borough constituency for the House of Commons
- 2010–2024 boundary of Birmingham Hodge Hill in Birmingham

- Location of Birmingham within England
- County: West Midlands
- Population: 121,678 (2011 census)
- Electorate: 75,985 (December 2010)

1983–2024
- Seats: One
- Created from: Birmingham Stechford
- Replaced by: Birmingham Hodge Hill and Solihull North

Birmingham Hodge Hill was a constituency (Note: A borough constituency (for the purposes of election expenses and type of returning officer)) of part of the city of Birmingham represented in the House of Commons of the UK Parliament from 2004 to 2024 by Liam Byrne of the Labour Party. (Note: As with all constituencies, the constituency elects one Member of Parliament (MP) by the first past the post system of election at least every five years.)

Under the 2023 review of Westminster constituencies, the seat was abolished and largely replaced with constituency of Birmingham Hodge Hill and Solihull North. It was first contested at the 2024 general election, with Byrne being re-elected for the new seat.

== Constituency profile ==
The constituency covered a diverse area of east Birmingham, including the predominantly Asian inner-city area of Washwood Heath and the mostly white area of Shard End on the city's eastern boundary, as well as Hodge Hill itself. There is roughly a three-way split of social housing, privately rented and privately owned homes. The area has a high proportion of low-income households, with the constituency having one of the highest Indices of Multiple Deprivation in the West Midlands for its central area.

== Boundaries ==
Map of boundaries 2010–2024

1983–1997: The City of Birmingham wards of Hodge Hill, Shard End, and Washwood Heath (as they existed on 1 February 1983).

1997–2010: The City of Birmingham wards of Hodge Hill, Shard End, and Washwood Heath (as they existed on 1 June 1994).

2010–2018: The City of Birmingham wards of Bordesley Green, Hodge Hill, Shard End, and Washwood Heath (as they existed on 12 April 2005).

When the Hodge Hill area committee district of Birmingham was created in 2004, its boundaries were those of the constituency.

2018–2024: Following a local government boundary review, which did not effect the parliamentary boundaries, the contents of the constituency were as follows with effect from May 2018:

- The City of Birmingham wards of Alum Rock, Bromford & Hodge Hill, Heartlands, Shard End and Ward End, most of Glebe Farm & Tile Cross, and Small Heath, and small parts of Bordesley & Highgate, and Bordesley Green.

Further to the 2023 review of Westminster constituencies which came into effect for the 2024 general election, the Boundary Commission for England abolished the constituency and created the new seat of Birmingham Hodge Hill and Solihull North as its primary successor; Alum Rock was transferred to Birmingham Ladywood and Small Heath to Birmingham Yardley, with the bulk of the remainder being included in the new seat.

== History ==
The constituency was created in 1983, taking much of abolished Birmingham Stechford, the remainder of which bolstered Birmingham Yardley (principally Stechford itself). The predecessor seat was won by the Labour candidate in all but one election since its 1950 creation.

The first Member of Parliament (MP) was Terry Davis, who had been MP for Birmingham Stechford from 1979 to 1983. In 2004, the appointment of Davis as secretary general of the Council of Europe resulted in a fiercely contested by-election. The seat saw a strong result by the Liberal Democrat candidate, (Note: In the same way as by-election in Leicester South, held on the same day by the Labour Party) who hoped to build on her party's previous by-election gain at Brent East, as well as vote splitting by the similarly aligned-to-Labour, anti-war RESPECT The Unity Coalition candidate. On a low turnout, the incumbent party, represented by Liam Byrne, held the seat by a margin of 460 votes over the Liberal Democrats. The 2015 result made the seat the ninth safest of Labour's 232 seats by percentage of majority. In 2017, Byrne received over 80% of the vote.

== Members of Parliament ==
Election	Member	Party	Notes
1983	Terry Davis	Labour	Resigned 2004
2004 by-election	Liam Byrne	Labour	Chief Secretary to the Treasury 2009–2010
2024	Constituency abolished		

== Election results 1983–2024 ==
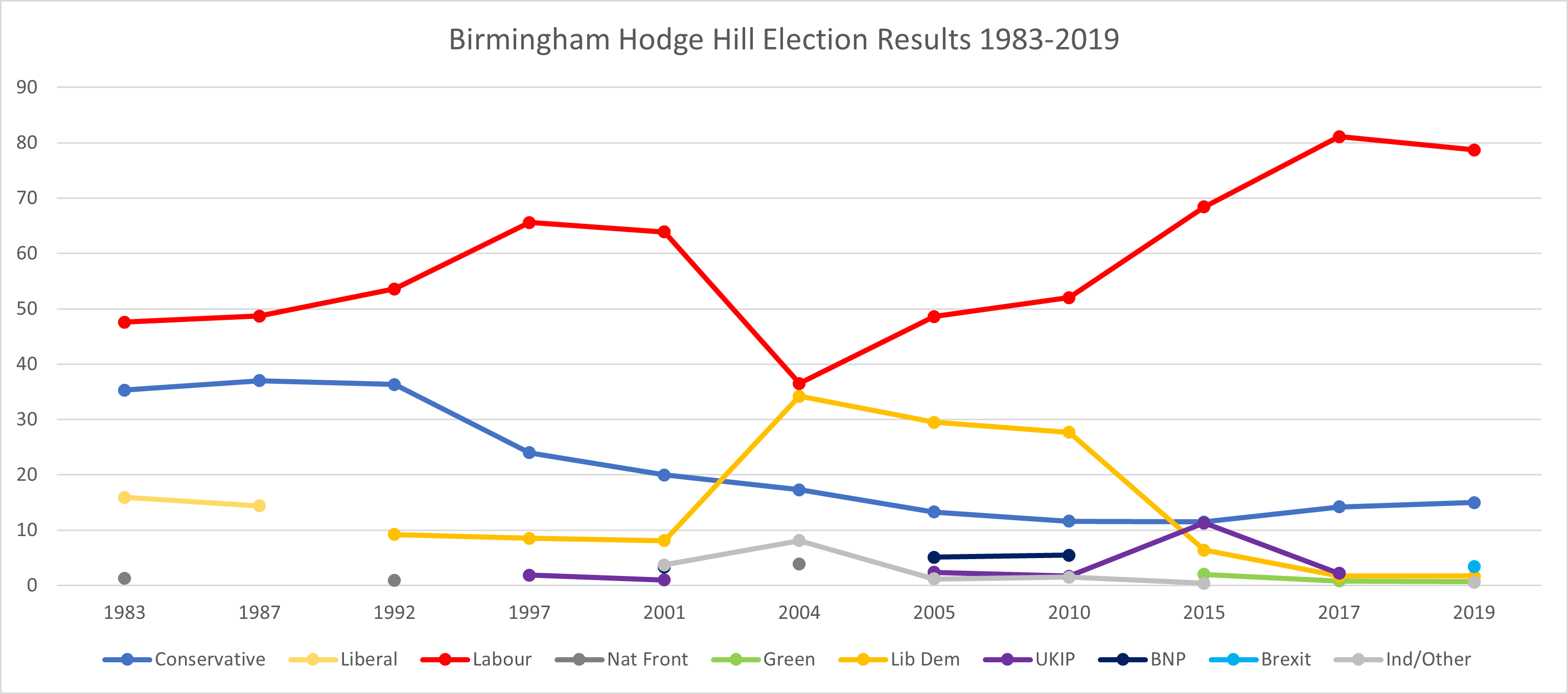

=== Elections in the 1980s ===
General election 1983: Birmingham Hodge Hill
Party	Candidate	Votes	%	±%
Labour	Terry Davis	19,692	47.6	
Conservative	Peter Roe	14,600	35.3	
Liberal	Graham Gopsill	6,557	15.9	
National Front	Norman Tomkinson	529	1.3	
Majority		5,092	12.3	
Turnout		41,378	67.6	
Labour win (new seat)				

General election 1987: Birmingham Hodge Hill
Party	Candidate	Votes	%	±%
Labour	Terry Davis	19,872	48.7	+1.1
Conservative	Stephen Eyre	15,083	37.0	+1.7
Liberal	Kenneth Hardeman	5,868	14.4	–1.5
Majority		4,789	11.7	–0.6
Turnout		40,823	68.9	+1.3
Labour hold		Swing	–0.3	

=== Elections in the 1990s ===
General election 1992: Birmingham Hodge Hill
Party	Candidate	Votes	%	±%
Labour	Terry Davis	21,895	53.6	+4.9
Conservative	Elizabeth Gibson	14,827	36.3	–0.7
Liberal Democrats	Sean Hagan	3,740	9.2	–5.2
National Front	Eddy Whicker	370	0.9	New
Majority		7,068	17.3	+5.6
Turnout		40,832	70.8	+1.9
Labour hold		Swing	+2.8	

General election 1997: Birmingham Hodge Hill
Party	Candidate	Votes	%	±%
Labour	Terry Davis	22,398	65.6	+12.0
Conservative	Edward Grant	8,198	24.0	–12.3
Liberal Democrats	Hadyn Thomas	2,891	8.5	–0.7
UKIP	Peter Johnson	660	1.9	New
Majority		14,200	41.6	+4.3
Turnout		34,147	60.9	–9.9
Labour hold		Swing	+12.2	

=== Elections in the 2000s ===
General election 2001: Birmingham, Hodge Hill
Party	Candidate	Votes	%	±%
Labour	Terry Davis	16,901	63.9	–1.7
Conservative	Debbie A. Lewis	5,283	20.0	–4.0
Liberal Democrats	Charles Dow	2,147	8.1	–0.4
BNP	Lee Windridge	889	3.3	New
People's Justice	Perwaz Hussain	561	2.1	New
Socialist Labour	Dennis Cridge	284	1.1	New
UKIP	Harvey B. Vivian	275	1.0	–0.9
Muslim Party	Ayub Khan	125	0.5	New
Majority		11,618	43.9	+2.3
Turnout		26,465	47.9	–13.0
Labour hold		Swing		

By-election 2004: Birmingham Hodge Hill
Party	Candidate	Votes	%	±%
Labour	Liam Byrne	7,451	36.5	–27.4
Liberal Democrats	Nicola S. Davies	6,991	34.2	+26.1
Conservative	Stephen Eyre	3,543	17.3	–2.7
Respect	John Rees	1,282	6.3	New
National Front	Jim W. Starkey	805	3.9	New
English Democrat	Mark K. Wheatley	277	1.4	New
Christian Vote	George Hargreaves	90	0.4	New
Majority		460	2.3	–41.6
Turnout		20,439	37.9	–10.0
Labour hold		Swing		

Note: percentage changes are from the figures at the 2001 general election, not the 2004 by-election.

General election 2005: Birmingham Hodge Hill
Party	Candidate	Votes	%	±%
Labour	Liam Byrne	13,822	48.6	–15.3
Liberal Democrats	Nicola S. Davies	8,373	29.5	+21.4
Conservative	Deborah H. Thomas	3,768	13.3	–6.7
BNP	Denis H. Adams	1,445	5.1	+1.8
UKIP	Adrian D. Duffen	680	2.4	+1.4
Peace and Progress	Azmat Begg	329	1.2	New
Majority		5,449	19.1	–24.8
Turnout		28,417	52.7	+4.8
Labour hold		Swing	–18.3	

=== Elections in the 2010s ===
General election 2010: Birmingham Hodge Hill
Party	Candidate	Votes	%	±%
Labour	Liam Byrne	22,077	52.0	+5.1
Liberal Democrats	Tariq Khan	11,775	27.7	–2.1
Conservative	Shailesh Parekh	4,936	11.6	+1.0
BNP	Richard Lumby	2,333	5.5	+0.4
UKIP	Waheed Rafiq	714	1.7	–1.1
SDP	Peter Johnson	637	1.5	New
Majority		10,302	24.3	+7.2
Turnout		42,472	56.6	+0.9
Labour hold		Swing	+3.6	

General election 2015: Birmingham Hodge Hill
Party	Candidate	Votes	%	±%
Labour	Liam Byrne	28,069	68.4	+16.4
Conservative	Kieran Mullan	4,707	11.5	–0.2
UKIP	Albert Duffen	4,651	11.3	+9.6
Liberal Democrats	Phil Bennion	2,624	6.4	–21.3
Green	Chris Nash	835	2.0	New
Communist	Andy Chaffer	153	0.4	New
Majority		23,362	56.9	+32.6
Turnout		41,039	54.5	–1.1
Labour hold		Swing	+8.3	

General election 2017: Birmingham Hodge Hill
Party	Candidate	Votes	%	±%
Labour	Liam Byrne	37,606	81.1	+12.7
Conservative	Ahmereen Reza	6,580	14.2	+2.7
UKIP	Mohammed Khan	1,016	2.2	–9.1
Liberal Democrats	Phil Bennion	805	1.7	–4.7
Green	Clare Thomas	387	0.8	–1.2
Majority		31,026	66.9	+10.0
Turnout		46,394	61.3	+6.8
Labour hold		Swing	+5.0	

General election 2019: Birmingham Hodge Hill
Party	Candidate	Votes	%	±%
Labour	Liam Byrne	35,397	78.7	–2.4
Conservative	Akaal Singh Sidhu	6,742	15.0	+0.8
Brexit Party	Jill Dagnan	1,519	3.4	New
Liberal Democrats	Waheed Rafiq^{1}	760	1.7	0.0
Green	Sylvia McKears	328	0.7	–0.1
CPA	Hilda Johani	257	0.6	New
Majority		28,655	63.7	–3.2
Turnout		45,003	57.5	–3.8
Registered electors		78,295		
Labour hold		Swing	–1.6	

^{1}: The Liberal Democrats suspended Waheed Rafiq from the party over numerous antisemitic and other offensive social media posts. It was too late to prevent him standing in the election and his name remained on the ballot paper as a Liberal Democrat. Rafiq polled the lowest percentage for any Liberal Democrat candidate in the 2019 election.

== See also ==
- parliamentary constituencies in the West Midlands (county)
