= Clare Heald =

Clare Mary Heald (née Harding; 28 August 1895 – 11 March 1973), or as she was to become later when she remarried, Clare Miller, was a well-known horsewoman in her day, and horrified the hierarchy of racing in 1930 by applying for a licence to ride under both Jockey Club (flat) and National Hunt (steeplechase) rules.

She was strongly supported by 'Brab' (Lord Brabazon), the famous airman and racing motorist, and others, and it was her intention one day to win, if she could, both the Derby and the Grand National. She had to content herself with winning some 30 point-to-point races in England and later in Kenya. One of her stallions was Syndrian, brother to Sicyon, both bred by Solly Joel (Solomon Joel).

Born Clare Mary Harding, she came from a large Catholic family at Old Springs Hall, near Market Drayton in Shropshire. She was a daughter of Francis Egerton Harding and Hon. Emma Mary Agnes Clifford. A niece of the Earl of Denbigh, and of Baron Clifford of Chudleigh, her first husband was William Henry Arthur Heald, himself an early airman, and brother of Sir Lionel Heald, the Attorney General, well known to Rhodesians as a member of the ill-fated Monckton Commission. Her second husband was Lt Cdr John Bryan Peter Duppa-Miller, G.C., one of the twelve naval officers who volunteered to dismantle the magnetic mines which were dropped off by the Germans over London in the autumn of 1940. With him, she settled in Salisbury, Rhodesia, in 1965. She had one child, Ann, who was married to Keith Stainton, the M.P. for Sudbury & Woodbridge. She had six grandchildren. She was a very gentle character, known for her gardening skills and her love of Siamese cats, which she bred for half a century.

In the middle of her fight with the Jockey Club, she was interviewed by a reporter for the Financial Times. Asked what she thought would happen to the punters if women were allowed to ride, she replied 'They lose too much now, backing what they think is the best horse. God only knows what will happen if they start backing what they think is the prettiest face!'

Clare Miller died in Salisbury, Rhodesia on 11 March 1973.
