= David Nicholl (neurologist) =

Northern Irish doctor

David Nicholl is a Northern Irish neurologist, human rights activist, fundraiser for Amnesty International, and online columnist. In March 2006, he initiated a letter in the medical journal The Lancet, signed by more than 250 medical experts, urging the United States to stop force-feeding at the Guantanamo Bay Naval Base and close down the prison camp. He is also a principal author of a reference work on neurological conditions

Nicholl holds the position of consultant neurologist at City Hospital & Queen Elizabeth Hospital, Birmingham, and is honorary senior lecturer at the University of Birmingham.

Nicholl is a specialist in Parkinson's disease, and is best known scientifically for his participation in the project for cloning a gene, PARK8, linked with at least one form of the disease.

In 2014, Nicholl signed a statement of support for Moazzam Begg, following Begg's arrest for allegations of supporting terrorism in the Syrian Civil War in a case which subsequently collapsed.

He stood for the Liberal Democrats in Bromsgrove at the 2019 general election. He got 6,779 votes (12.5%), and lost to the Conservative candidate Sajid Javid. He stood again in 2024, coming fourth.
