= Andrew MacKay (British politician) =

British politician

The Right Honourable Andrew MacKay

Shadow Secretary of State for Northern Ireland
- In office 23 June 1997 – 14 September 2001
- Leader: William Hague
- Preceded by: Mo Mowlam
- Succeeded by: Quentin Davies

Opposition Deputy Chief Whip of the House of Commons
- In office 2 May 1997 – 23 June 1997
- Leader: John Major
- Preceded by: Nick Brown
- Succeeded by: Peter Ainsworth

Government Deputy Chief Whip Treasurer of the Household
- In office 23 July 1996 – 2 May 1997
- Prime Minister: John Major
- Preceded by: Greg Knight
- Succeeded by: George Mudie

Junior Government Whip Vice-Chamberlain of the Household
- In office 18 October 1995 – 23 July 1996
- Prime Minister: John Major
- Preceded by: Timothy Kirkhope
- Succeeded by: Derek Conway

Lord Commissioner of the Treasury
- In office 27 May 1993 – 17 October 1995
- Prime Minister: John Major
- Preceded by: Greg Knight
- Succeeded by: Michael Bates

Member of Parliament for Bracknell East Berkshire (1983–1997)
- In office 10 June 1983 – 12 April 2010
- Preceded by: Constituency created
- Succeeded by: Phillip Lee

Member of Parliament for Birmingham Stechford
- In office 1 April 1977 – 7 April 1979
- Preceded by: Roy Jenkins
- Succeeded by: Terry Davis

Personal details
- Born: 27 August 1949 (age 77) Birmingham, Warwickshire, UK
- Party: Conservative
- Spouses: Diana Joy Kinchin (m. 1974; div. 1996) Julie Kirkbride (m. 1997)
- Children: 3
- Education: Solihull School

Andrew James MacKay (born 27 August 1949) is a British Conservative Party politician who served as the Member of Parliament (MP) for Birmingham Stechford from 1977 to 1979, East Berkshire from 1983 to 1997 and for Bracknell in Berkshire from 1997 to 2010.

== Early life ==
MacKay attended Solihull School, an independent school in Solihull, West Midlands. After leaving school he chaired the Solihull Young Conservatives. He has worked as a car salesman, estate agent and company director.

== Parliamentary career ==
MacKay first entered parliament in 1977, after taking Birmingham Stechford from Labour at the Birmingham Stechford by-election. He lost the seat at the 1979 general election, but re-entered parliament in 1983 as MP for East Berkshire. He was deputy Chief Whip under John Major, and was Shadow Secretary of State for Northern Ireland from 1997 to September 2001 during the leadership of William Hague. He was on the backbenches subsequently, but was appointed a Conservative Deputy Chairman in September 2004 with responsibility for candidates, and, after David Cameron's election in November 2005 as Leader of the Conservative Party, MacKay became a Senior Parliamentary/Political Adviser to the new Conservative leader.

=== Expenses claims ===
MacKay and his wife (and fellow MP) Julie Kirkbride own two homes: one in her constituency; and a flat close to Parliament in Westminster. In a case of so-called "double-dipping," according to The Daily Telegraph, MacKay had used his Additional Costs Allowance to claim more than £1,000 a month in mortgage interest payments on their joint Westminster flat. His wife used her Additional Costs Allowance to claim over £900 a month on paying off the mortgage for their family home near her constituency. This means they effectively had no main home but two second homes – and were using public funds to pay for both of them. During 2008–9, MacKay claimed a total of £23,083 under Additional Costs Allowance, while Kirkbride claimed £22,575. They also claimed for each other's travel costs, with Kirkbride claiming £1,392 to meet spouse travel, while MacKay claimed £408. On 14 May 2009, he resigned from his position as parliamentary aide to Cameron in the wake of the furore over Parliamentary expenses after what was described as an "unacceptable" expenses claim.

At a public meeting in his constituency on 22 May he had been heckled, and called a "thieving toad" according to The Independent.

In an interview with Matthew Amroliwala on BBC News the following morning, MacKay apologised for his error of judgement. In what he claimed was an agreed procedure with the Parliamentary Claims office, he had designated their Westminster home as his secondary home, while Kirkbride has designated the Bromsgrove house as her second home. MacKay announced that the procedure had been ongoing for eight or nine years, and that he would be repaying the monies after taking advice from the Conservatives scrutiny committee.

On 23 May 2009, after a telephone call from Cameron, it was announced that MacKay would stand down at the 2010 general election.

== Personal life ==
In 1974 MacKay married Diana Joy Kinchin; they had two children, but divorced in 1996. The following year, MacKay married Julie Kirkbride, a fellow Conservative MP; the couple have a son who attended Westminster School.

Parliament of the United Kingdom
Preceded by Roy Jenkins	Member of Parliament for Birmingham Stechford; 1977–1979	Succeeded by Terry Davis
New constituency	Member of Parliament for East Berkshire; 1983–1997	Constituency abolished
New constituency	Member of Parliament for Bracknell; 1997–2010	Succeeded by Phillip Lee
Preceded by Helene Hayman	Baby of the House; 1977–1979	Succeeded by David Alton
Government offices
Preceded by Timothy Kirkhope	Vice-Chamberlain of the Household (Government whip); 1995–1996	Succeeded by Derek Conway
Preceded by Greg Knight	Deputy Chief Whip of the House of Commons; Treasurer of the Household; 1996–1997	Succeeded by George Mudie
Political offices
Preceded by Mo Mowlam	Shadow Secretary of State for Northern Ireland; 1997–2001	Succeeded by Quentin Davies
Party political offices
Preceded by Greg Knight	Conservative Deputy Chief Whip in the House of Commons; 1996–1997	Succeeded by Peter Ainsworth
