= Stephen Eyre =

British High-Court Judge

The Honourable Mr Justice Eyre
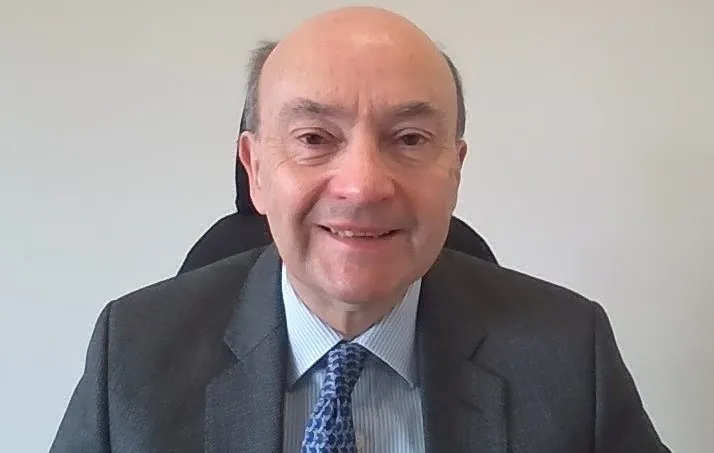

Justice of the High Court
- Incumbent
- Assumed office 1 October 2021
- Nominated by: Dominic Raab
- Appointed by: Elizabeth II

Personal details
- Born: 17 October 1957 (age 68) Stourbridge
- Party: Conservative
- Education: New College Oxford; Cardiff University

Sir Stephen John Arthur Eyre KC (born 17 October 1957), styled Mr Justice Eyre, is a British High Court judge.

== Personal life ==
Eyre was born in Stourbridge on the 17th of October 1957 and attended Solihull School in the West Midlands.

He later began his studies in 1976 at New College, Oxford, graduating as a Bachelor of Arts in 1979 and as a Bachelor of Civil Law in 1980. He would later take a Master of Laws in 2010 at Cardiff University.

Eyre married Margaret Goodman in 1989.

== Career ==
He was called to the Bar in 1981 by Inner Temple, making him the first lawyer in his family. He then became a member of 1 Fountain Court Chambers in Birmingham until 2002 when the chambers merged with St Philips Chambers, Birmingham.

Eyre was appointed as a Recorder in 2005 and in 2007, appointed as a Fee-Paid Judge for the First-tier Tribunal of Health, Education and Social Care.

From 2009 to 2020 Stephen Eyre was Chancellor, Vicar-General and Official Principal of the Diocese of Coventry (a Judge of the Consistory Court and principal legal adviser to the Lord Bishop) being replaced in that position by The Worshipful Glyn Samuel. He was also Chancellor of the Diocese of Lichfield for ten years until September 2022, being replaced in that position by The Worshipful Dr Anthony Verduyn.

Eyre was appointed Queen's Counsel in 2015.

He would later be appointed as a Circuit judge in 2015 and assigned to the Birmingham, Leamington Spa and Wolverhampton Circuit. In 2017 he was appointed to the Business and Property Courts in Manchester and Liverpool, as a Specialist Civil Circuit Judge.

In 2021, Eyre was appointed as a High Court Judge and assigned to the King's Bench Division. He received the customary knighthood in March 2022 at Windsor Castle.

=== Political career ===
Eyre was elected to Solihull Metropolitan Borough Council for the Conservatives representing Olton ward in 1983, and was re-elected in 1987. He stood down in 1991 to contest the Strangford seat in the 1992 general election, but returned as a Councillor for the St Alphege ward in 1992. He only served one term, standing down again in 1996.

While working as a barrister, Eyre stood as the Conservative Party candidate in the 2004 Birmingham Hodge Hill by-election, which elected Labour MP Liam Byrne. Eyre finished third of seven candidates, with 17.3 percent of the vote.

He had previously stood in Stourbridge in 2001 (second of five, 37.6%), Strangford in 1992 (fourth of five, 15.1%), and Birmingham Hodge Hill in 1987 (second of three, 37%).
