= Julie Kirkbride =

British Conservative politician

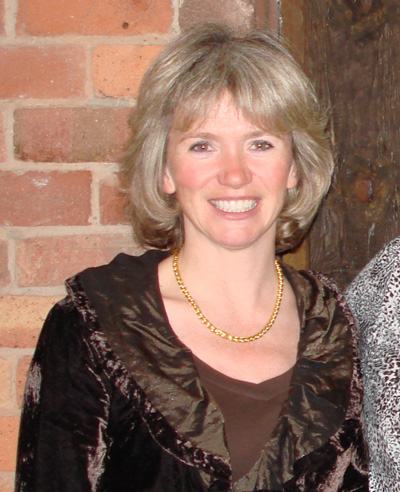
- Kirkbride in 2007

Shadow Secretary of State for Culture, Media and Sport
- In office 6 November 2003 – 19 June 2004
- Leader: Michael Howard
- Preceded by: John Whittingdale
- Succeeded by: John Whittingdale

Member of Parliament for Bromsgrove
- In office 1 May 1997 – 12 April 2010
- Preceded by: Roy Thomason
- Succeeded by: Sajid Javid

Personal details
- Born: 5 June 1960 (age 66) Halifax, West Riding of Yorkshire, England
- Party: Conservative
- Spouse: Andrew MacKay (m. 1997)
- Children: 1
- Education: Girton College, Cambridge

Julie Kirkbride (born 5 June 1960) is a British Conservative politician. She was the Member of Parliament for the Conservative stronghold of Bromsgrove from the 1997 to the 2010 general elections.

== Early life ==
Kirkbride was born in Halifax, West Riding of Yorkshire. Her father was a lorry driver, who died when she was seven. Her mother was a secretary at Rowntree Mackintosh (now owned by Nestlé). She went to the Highlands School (now North Halifax Grammar School) in Illingworth, Halifax. She studied at Girton College, Cambridge from 1978–81, receiving an MA in Economics and History, and serving as vice-president of the Cambridge Union Society in 1981. From 1981–82, she worked as a journalist for the Parliamentary Weekly House Magazine. She went to the Graduate School of Journalism of the University of California Berkeley from 1982–83. She was a researcher for Yorkshire Television from 1983–86, a producer for BBC News and Current Affairs from 1986–89, then worked as a producer at the ITN Parliamentary Unit from 1989–92. She was the political correspondent of The Daily Telegraph from 1992–96 and social affairs editor of The Sunday Telegraph from 1996 until 1997.

== Parliamentary career ==
In 1997 general election Kirkbride was elected MP of Bromsgrove, a seat which had consistently been Conservative since the 1970s. She was re-elected in 2001 election and 2005 election with over 50 per cent of votes.

Kirkbride was the Conservative spokesman on Culture, Media and Sport from 2003 to 2004, but was replaced in a reshuffle by the party leader at that time, Michael Howard.

On 10 November 2006, it was revealed that she had links with the Midlands Industrial Council, which has donated millions of pounds to the Conservative Party.

She stood down as a Member of Parliament before the 2010 general election, as a result of public anger over her expenses claims. In October 2010, after she had stood down, the Parliamentary Commissioner for Standards cleared her of any wrongdoing and dismissed the complaints against her.

=== Expenses claims ===
On 14 May 2009, her husband Andrew MacKay, the Conservative Member for Bracknell, resigned from his position as parliamentary aide to David Cameron, in the wake of the furore over Parliamentary expenses after what was described as an "unacceptable" expenses claim.

MacKay and Kirkbride owned two homes: one in her constituency of Bromsgrove; and a house close to Parliament in Westminster. In a case of so-called double-dipping, according to The Daily Telegraph, Mackay had used his Additional Costs Allowance to claim more than £1,000 a month in mortgage interest payments on their joint Westminster house – even though he did not have a residence in his Bracknell constituency – while Kirkbride used her Additional Costs Allowance to claim over £900 a month to pay the mortgage for their family home in her constituency. "This means," reports The Daily Telegraph, "they effectively had no main home but two second homes – and were using public funds to pay for both of them". During 2008–9, MacKay claimed a total of £23,083 under Additional Costs Allowance, while Kirkbride claimed £22,575. They also claimed for each other's travel costs, with Kirkbride claiming £1,392 to meet spouse travel, while MacKay claimed £408.

Julie Kirkbride employed her sister at taxpayers' expense as her secretary despite her sister living 140 miles from the constituency. Kirkbride also extended her mortgage to pay for a £50,000 extension to her house, which she said was to provide a separate bedroom for her son, and claimed for this on expenses. She said she allowed her brother to stay rent free in her house some of the time so that he could care for her son, Angus, while she undertook constituency work in the evening. Kirkbride also suggested that criticism of her expense claims could deter women from entering Parliament.

On 28 May 2009, Kirkbride cancelled a meeting in her Bromsgrove constituency to discuss the expense claims, and it was announced that owing to press criticism of her expense claims, she intended to stand down at the next election. In a letter to Cameron, she said, "My principal concern has to be for my very loyal local supporters in Bromsgrove whose trust in me has been very humbling in the last few weeks ... I also must take into account the effects on my family." A petition in the Bromsgrove constituency demanding Kirkbride's resignation had attracted over 5,000 signatures. Kirkbride also lost the trust of party activists: the results of a poll on the ConservativeHome website showed that 81% of those responding (a self-selecting sample) thought Kirkbride should go and only 6% that she should remain as a Conservative MP. Shortly before her decision to stand down, she had stated that it never crossed her mind that she was doing anything wrong; however, she was also quoted as saying that it was "hugely upsetting to realise I have let people down".

On 5 November, she reversed her decision, telling a meeting of the Executive Council of Bromsgrove Conservative Association that she wanted to be considered as their candidate for the next general election. On 18 December she announced she would indeed stand down, in a Christmas and New Year message on her website saying "this is entirely my decision".

The Legg review of MPs expenses declared that Kirkbride had to pay back £29,243, the fifth highest total of all MPs. Kirkbride's husband Andrew MacKay had to pay back £31,193, ranking third. Both MPs had paid back the amount in full by the time of the release of the report on 4 February 2010. Kirkbride was one of 98 MPs who voted in favour of legislation which would have kept MPs' expense details secret.

In October 2010, the Parliamentary Commissioner of Standards rejected complaints of her expenses and upheld that she had been within the rules to claim her Bromsgrove property as a second home, to allow her brother to stay to look after her child and to extend her mortgage to provide a further bedroom. On the issue of the second home he wrote: "I have concluded that Mr MacKay was wrong to designate the Bromsgrove property as his main home. Given that, it would be unreasonable to hold that Ms Kirkbride could not make legitimate claims from parliamentary resources for the home in her constituency which she had identified as her second home".

On the issue of the extended mortgage he wrote: "I conclude, therefore, that Ms Kirkbride was within the rules in claiming interest on the additional mortgage which she, with her husband, took out in April 2008 to extend her Bromsgrove constituency property by building a third bedroom for it so that she had somewhere for her child carer to stay while she was busy on her parliamentary duties".

On the issue of her brother, the Commissioner concluded: "I consider that it would be an unduly harsh interpretation of the rules to require a member to meet the living costs of having a person stay overnight in their home when that person was there to look after their dependant child so that they could perform their parliamentary duties. Ms Kirkbride's son was at an age when it was essential that someone should be with him in the evening and overnight. The arrangement enabled Ms Kirkbride to continue with her constituency duties as a Member of Parliament"

== Post parliamentary career ==
Kirkbride has been a trustee of the charity Volunteering Matters since 2016. In 2019, she became a non-executive director of the education inspectorate Ofsted That same year she also became a trustee of the education charity the New Schools Network.

== Personal life ==
She had previously been the girlfriend of Conservative MP Stephen Milligan before his death by auto-erotic asphyxiation in 1994. In August 1997, she married Andrew MacKay, the Conservative Member for Bracknell, and their son was born in October 2000.

Parliament of the United Kingdom
Preceded by Roy Thomason	Member of Parliament for Bromsgrove; 1997– 2010	Succeeded by Sajid Javid
