= East Berkshire =

UK Parliament constituency (1983–1997)

- Former county constituency for the House of Commons
- Boundary of East Berkshire in Berkshire for the 1992 general election

- Location of Berkshire within England
- County: Berkshire
- Major settlements: Bracknell

1983–1997
- Seats: One
- Created from: Wokingham, Windsor & Maidenhead, and Beaconsfield
- Replaced by: Bracknell

East Berkshire was a county constituency in the county of Berkshire. It returned one Member of Parliament (MP) to the House of Commons of the Parliament of the United Kingdom, elected by the first past the post voting system.

The constituency was created for the 1983 general election, and abolished for the 1997 general election.

== History ==
This safe Conservative seat was represented for its entire existence by Andrew MacKay.

== Boundaries ==
=== 1983–1997 ===
- The District of Bracknell; and
- The Royal Borough of Windsor and Maidenhead wards of Datchet, Horton and Wraysbury, Old Windsor, Sunningdale and South Ascot, and Sunninghill.

The constituency largely comprised the District of Bracknell (formerly the Rural District of Easthampstead), which had been part of Wokingham. It also included those parts of the Royal Borough of Windsor and Maidenhead which had formerly made up the Rural District of Windsor (transferred from Windsor and Maidenhead), and those parishes in the former Rural District of Eton in Buckinghamshire which had been transferred to Berkshire by the Local Government Act 1972 (previously part of Beaconsfield).

Its main settlement was Bracknell, and it also included Ascot, Sunningdale, Sunninghill, Datchet, Crowthorne, Sandhurst, and Old Windsor.

The seat was abolished for the 1997 general election with the majority being absorbed into the new constituency of Bracknell. Eastern areas, comprising the parts of the Royal Borough of Windsor and Maidenhead and also including Ascot, were transferred to the re-established constituency of Windsor.

== Members of Parliament ==
| Election | Member | Party |
|---|---|---|
| 1983 | Andrew MacKay | Conservative |
| 1997 | constituency abolished | |

== Elections ==
=== Elections in the 1980s ===
General election 1983: East Berkshire
| Party | Candidate | Votes | % | ±% |
|---|---|---|---|---|
| Conservative | Andrew MacKay | 33,967 | 56.8 | |
| SDP | Kevin O'Sullivan | 17,868 | 29.9 | |
| Labour | Elizabeth Rogers | 7,953 | 13.3 | |
| Majority | | 16,099 | 26.9 | |
| Turnout | | 59,789 | 73.3 | |
| Conservative win (new seat) | | | | |

General election 1987: East Berkshire
| Party | Candidate | Votes | % | ±% |
|---|---|---|---|---|
| Conservative | Andrew MacKay | 39,094 | 60.3 | +3.5 |
| SDP | Linda Murray | 16,468 | 25.4 | −4.5 |
| Labour | Robert Evans | 9,287 | 14.3 | +1.0 |
| Majority | | 22,626 | 34.9 | +8.0 |
| Turnout | | 64,846 | 73.8 | +0.5 |
| Conservative hold | | Swing | +4.0 | |

=== Elections in the 1990s ===
General election 1992: East Berkshire
| Party | Candidate | Votes | % | ±% |
|---|---|---|---|---|
| Conservative | Andrew MacKay | 43,898 | 59.7 | −0.6 |
| Liberal Democrats | Linda Murray | 15,218 | 20.7 | −4.7 |
| Labour | Keith Dibble | 14,458 | 19.7 | +5.4 |
| Majority | | 28,680 | 39.0 | +4.1 |
| Turnout | | 73,574 | 81.4 | +7.6 |
| Conservative hold | | Swing | +2.0 | |

== See also ==
- List of parliamentary constituencies in Berkshire
