= Bromsgrove and Redditch =

UK Parliament constituency (1974–1983)

- Former constituency for the House of Commons
- Bromsgrove and Redditch in Worcestershire, showing boundaries used from 1974–1983

February 1974–1983
- Seats: one
- Created from: Bromsgrove
- Replaced by: Bromsgrove and Mid Worcestershire

Bromsgrove and Redditch was a parliamentary constituency located in Worcestershire, encompassing the towns of Bromsgrove and Redditch. It returned one Member of Parliament (MP) to the House of Commons of the Parliament of the United Kingdom.

The constituency was established for the February 1974 general election, and abolished ahead of the 1983 general election.

== Boundaries ==
The Urban Districts of Bromsgrove and Redditch, and the Rural District of Bromsgrove.

== Members of Parliament ==
Election	Member	Party
Feb 1974	Hal Miller	Conservative
1983	constituency abolished: see Bromsgrove & Mid Worcestershire	

== Election results ==
=== Elections in the 1970s ===
General election 1979: Bromsgrove and Redditch
Party	Candidate	Votes	%	±%
Conservative	Hal Miller	44,621	54.30	
Labour	Anne Davis	28,736	34.97	
Liberal	Nigel Phillips	8,066	9.82	
National Front	BA Deakin	752	0.92	New
Majority		15,885	19.33	
Turnout		82,175	78.73	
Conservative hold		Swing		

General election October 1974: Bromsgrove and Redditch
Party	Candidate	Votes	%	±%
Conservative	Hal Miller	31,153	44.56	
Labour	Terry Davis	29,085	41.60	
Liberal	P Kelway	9,679	13.84	
Majority		2,068	2.96	
Turnout		69,917	79.59	
Conservative hold		Swing		

General election February 1974: Bromsgrove and Redditch
Party	Candidate	Votes	%	±%
Conservative	Hal Miller	33,125	45.14	
Labour	Terry Davis	29,536	40.25	
Liberal	GE Cartwright	10,726	14.62	
Majority		3,589	4.89	
Turnout		73,387	84.28	
Conservative win (new seat)				
