= Michael Higgs (politician) =

British politician (1912–1995)

Sir Michael Higgs DL

Member of Parliament for Bromsgrove
- In office 23 February 1950 – 6 May 1955
- Preceded by: Constituency established
- Succeeded by: James Dance

Personal details
- Born: John Michael Clifford Higgs; 30 May 1912
- Died: 20 October 1995 (aged 83)
- Party: Conservative
- Spouse(s): Diana Louise Jerrams (m. 1936; died 1950) Rachel Mary Jones (m. 1952)
- Education: University of Birmingham (LLB)

Military service
- Branch/service: British Army
- Unit: Royal Artillery
- Battles/wars: World War II

Sir John Michael Clifford Higgs DL (30 May 1912 – 20 October 1995) was a solicitor from Brierley Hill who served as the Conservative Member of Parliament (MP) for Bromsgrove from 1950 to 1955.

== Early life and family ==
The son of Albert W. Higgs, a solicitor from Lye (then in Worcestershire), Michael Higgs was educated at Shrewsbury School and at the University of Birmingham, where he earned his LL.B. He was admitted as a solicitor in 1934. He married twice: first in May 1936 to Diana Louise Jerrams (died 1950), and, secondly, in June 1952, to Rachel Mary Jones, from Pedmore, Stourbridge.

== Career ==
During World War II he served with the Royal Artillery from 1939 to 1942, and then from 1942 to 1946 as a member of the Judge Advocate-General's staff.

He was a member of Staffordshire County Council from 1946 to 1949, and of Worcestershire County Council from 1953 to 1973, serving as the chairman of the latter from to 1959 to 1973. He was then chairman of Hereford and Worcester County Council from 1973 to 1977.

He was elected at the 1950 general election as the MP for the newly created Bromsgrove division of Worcestershire. He was re-elected in 1951, and stood down from the House of Commons at the 1955 general election.

He was made a Deputy Lieutenant of Worcestershire in August 1968, and it was announced in the 1969 New Year Honours that he was to be knighted. The knighthood was conferred on 11 February 1969, at Buckingham Palace.

Parliament of the United Kingdom
New constituency	Member of Parliament for Bromsgrove; 1950 – 1955	Succeeded by James Dance
