= Roy Thomason =

British Conservative politician (1944–2024)

Roy Thomason OBE

Member of Parliament for Bromsgrove
- In office 9 April 1992 – 8 April 1997
- Preceded by: Sir Hal Miller
- Succeeded by: Julie Kirkbride

Personal details
- Born: 14 December 1944
- Died: 16 October 2024 (aged 79)
- Party: Conservative
- Education: Cheney School; The College of Law

Kenneth Roy Thomason, OBE (14 December 1944 – 16 October 2024) was a British Conservative Party politician. He was a local government leader and served one term as a Member of Parliament (MP).

== Early life and education ==
Thomason was born on 14 December 1944. He was educated at Cheney School in Oxford and trained as a Solicitor at the College of Law, being admitted to the Roll of Solicitors in 1969. Thomason practised in Bournemouth.

== Local government ==
Thomason was elected to Bournemouth Council in 1970. From 1974 to 1982 he was the Leader of the council, and he was made a delegate to the Council of the Association of District Councils in 1979. Thomason was made Chairman of the Conservative Party's Local Government Advisory Committee in 1980 and became Leader of the Conservative Group on the Association of District Councils the next year, serving until 1984 and 1987 respectively. In 1986 he was made an Officer of the Order of the British Empire for services to local government.

== Parliament ==
Thomason contested Newport East in 1983, coming second to Labour's Roy Hughes by 2,630 votes.

Between 1988 and 1991 Thomason served on the National Union of Conservative and Unionist Associations Executive, a Conservative body which administered the party. He was selected to follow Sir Hal Miller as candidate for the safe seat of Bromsgrove, and won the seat with a 13,702 majority in the 1992 election. Thomason was one of 26 new Conservative MPs to sign an Early Day Motion put down by Eurosceptics calling for a "fresh start" in Britain's negotiations with the European Communities, but was not a hardened eurosceptic and signed an open letter calling for support for the 'paving motion' on the Maastricht Treaty in November 1992.

On social issues Thomason was mildly progressive, supporting a reduction in the age of consent for gay sex to 18 rather than equalising it with the heterosexual age at 16. He resigned from the Carlton Club in December 1994 at a time of a dispute over the admission of women, although newspapers suspected this was because he could not justify the cost of membership.

== Decision to stand down ==
Thomason was censured by the House of Commons Select Committee on Standards and Privileges for failing to declare loans made to him. He decided not to re-stand after the local Conservative Association opened nominations to other candidates.

On 18 September 1996, Thomason decided he would not offer himself as a candidate for reselection and would stand down as an MP.

== Subsequent career ==
After the 1997 election, Thomason went back into business management and was executive chairman of the Charminster group of property companies. He also served as chairman of London Strategic Housing, a Housing Association.

== Death ==
Thomason died on 16 October 2024, at the age of 79.

Parliament of the United Kingdom
Preceded by Sir Hal Miller	Member of Parliament for Bromsgrove; 1992–1997	Succeeded by Julie Kirkbride
