= Bradley Thomas (British politician) =

British politician

Bradley Thomas MP
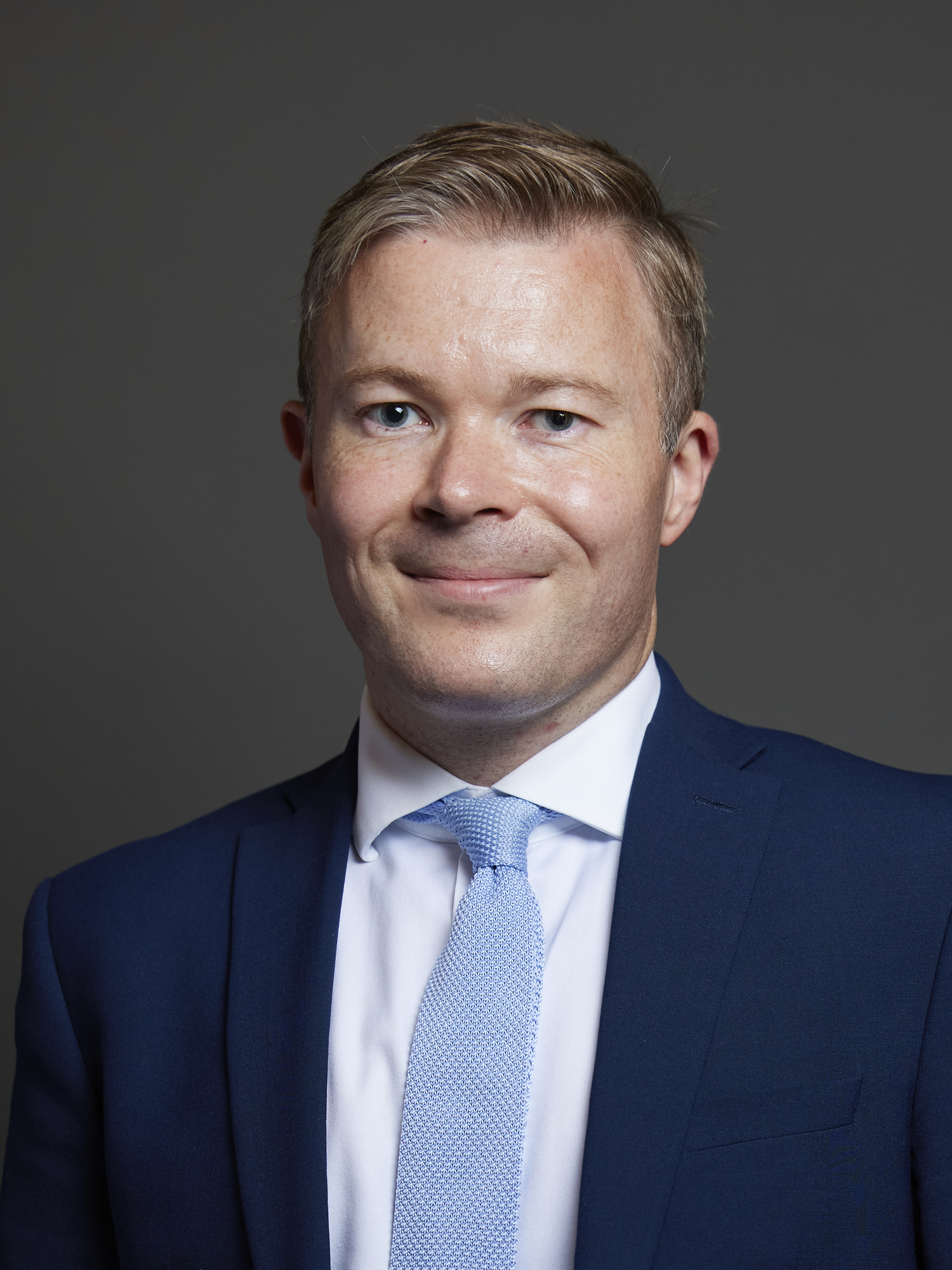
- Official portrait, 2024

Shadow Parliamentary Under-Secretary for Business
- Incumbent
- Assumed office 2 September 2026
- Leader: Kemi Badenoch
- Preceded by: Greg Smith

Opposition Assistant Whip
- Incumbent
- Assumed office 2 September 2026
- Leader: Kemi Badenoch

Member of Parliament for Bromsgrove
- Incumbent
- Assumed office 4 July 2024
- Preceded by: Sajid Javid
- Majority: 3,016 (6.0%)

Personal details
- Party: Conservative

Bradley Anthony Thomas is a British Conservative politician who has served as the Member of Parliament (MP) for Bromsgrove since 2024. He has been Shadow Parliamentary Under-Secretary of State for Business and an Opposition Whip since September 2026.

== Early life and career ==
Thomas was born and raised in rural Worcestershire.

Before entering politics, he worked in the global energy sector. Thomas served as a councillor for the Harvington and Norton ward in Wychavon District Council, serving as the leader of the council from 2018 until 2023, when he announced he would be stepping down from his role after being selected as the prospective parliamentary candidate for Bromsgrove.

== Parliamentary career ==
Thomas was elected as the MP for Bromsgrove in the 2024 General Election, securing a majority of 3,016 over Neena Gill, the Labour candidate for the constituency.

In October 2024, Bradley was elected to the Energy Security and Net Zero Select Committee. As part of the Committee, Bradley scrutinises the policy, spending and administration of the Department for Energy Security and Net Zero and its public bodies, including Ofgem and the Committee on Climate Change.

Following his election to the Energy Security and Net Zero Select Committee. In November 2024, Bradley was appointed Parliamentary Private Secretary to the Shadow Energy Security and Net Zero Secretary.

=== Constituency work ===
A major focus of Thomas's parliamentary work has been opposition to housing development on the green belt in Bromsgrove and the surrounding villages. Bromsgrove constituency is predominantly rural, with approximately 89% of the constituency designated as green belt. Thomas has criticised the Government's increase in the mandatory housing target for Bromsgrove, arguing that it would place disproportionate pressure on green-belt land while the housing target for neighbouring Birmingham had been reduced.

In May 2025, Thomas campaigned against proposals for the Groveley Garden Village, visiting residents and community groups around Upper Bittell Reservoir and arguing that the development would result in the loss of green-belt land and the expansion of Birmingham into Bromsgrove district. He subsequently opposed the inclusion of further green-belt sites in Bromsgrove District Council's emerging local plan and called for new housing to be concentrated on brownfield land.

In November 2025, Thomas presented a parliamentary petition on housing targets for Bromsgrove District, which had received 5,936 signatures. The petition called for greater scrutiny of the methodology used to calculate Bromsgrove's housing requirement, a more even distribution of housing demand with neighbouring Birmingham, and infrastructure to be provided alongside new housing. He also raised the issue during a December 2025 debate on planning reform, arguing that the Government's commitment to brownfield-first development was inconsistent with the pressure being placed on Bromsgrove's green belt.

Thomas also opposed proposals for development at Bromsgrove Golf Centre. In August 2025, he met representatives of Bromsgrove Golf Club after land at and adjacent to the course was identified for potential housing development, subsequently supporting the club's campaign against the proposals. In February 2026, he questioned the Minister for Housing and Planning in the House of Commons over whether golf courses should be used for large-scale housing development and asked the Government to meet him and representatives of the golf club. Following the submission of a planning application for up to 700 homes on the site, he continued to oppose the development.

Thomas has also raised concerns about grey belt development and speculative housing proposals elsewhere in the constituency, including in Wythall, Hagley and Cofton Hackett. In May 2026, he launched a parliamentary petition calling for housing to be built on brownfield land before green-belt sites, empty homes to be brought back into use, and supporting infrastructure to be provided alongside new development. In July, he wrote to Prime Minister Andy Burnham calling for the 85% increase in Bromsgrove and the Villages' housing target to be reversed. In September, he raised the issue directly with Burnham at PMQs, asking him to work with him to find a "new path forward" on protecting the green belt.

Another major constituency issue for Thomas has been the A38 Bromsgrove Route Enhancement Programme (BREP). He has repeatedly raised concerns with Worcestershire County Council about disruption caused by the scheme and met council officials and the BREP programme manager. In August 2025, he called for all non-essential roadworks in Bromsgrove to be suspended while BREP works were under way, arguing that concurrent roadworks were exacerbating congestion.

Thomas continued to seek updates from Worcestershire County Council throughout 2025 and 2026, raising constituents' concerns about congestion and delays. In December 2025, he said that the council had assured him that BREP would be completed by the end of December 2026. In August 2026, following a further delay, Thomas called for greater intervention and wrote to Transport Secretary Heidi Alexander asking her to instruct National Highways to review and administer the scheme to completion.

=== Opposition frontbench ===
In September 2026, Thomas was promoted by Kemi Badenoch during a reshuffle of the Conservative frontbench. He was appointed Shadow Parliamentary Under-Secretary of State for Business and Opposition Whip.

== Electoral history ==
General election 2024: Bromsgrove
| Party | Candidate | Votes | % | ±% |
|---|---|---|---|---|
| Conservative | Bradley Thomas | 16,533 | 32.8 | −30.6 |
| Labour | Neena Gill | 13,517 | 26.8 | +6.0 |
| Reform | Glen Brampton | 9,584 | 19.0 | New |
| Liberal Democrats | David Nicholl | 7,391 | 14.7 | +2.2 |
| Green | Talia Ellis | 1,675 | 3.3 | 0.0 |
| Independent | Sam Ammar | 1,561 | 3.1 | New |
| Workers Party | Aheesha Zahir | 144 | 0.3 | New |
| Majority | | 3,016 | 6.0 | −36.6 |
| Turnout | | 50,405 | 66.1 | −6.5 |
| Conservative hold | | Swing | −18.5 | |

Parliament of the United Kingdom
| Preceded by Sajid Javid | Member of Parliament for Bromsgrove; 2024–present | Incumbent |
