= Birmingham Stechford (constituency) =

Parliamentary constituency in the United Kingdom, 1950–1983

- Former borough constituency for the House of Commons
- County: West Midlands

1950–1983
- Seats: One
- Created from: Birmingham Erdington and Birmingham Yardley
- Replaced by: Birmingham Hodge Hill and Birmingham Yardley

Birmingham Stechford was a parliamentary constituency centred on the Stechford district of the city of Birmingham. It returned one Member of Parliament (MP) to the House of Commons of the Parliament of the United Kingdom, elected by the first-past-the-post voting system.

The constituency was created for the 1950 general election, and abolished for the 1983 general election. Stechford itself is now part of the Birmingham Yardley seat.

== Boundaries ==
1950–1955: The County Borough of Birmingham wards of Sheldon, Stechford, and Washwood Heath.

1955–1974: The County Borough of Birmingham wards of Stechford and Washwood Heath.

1974–1983: The County Borough of Birmingham wards of Shard End, Stechford, and Washwood Heath.

== Members of Parliament ==
Election	Member	Party
1950	Roy Jenkins	Labour
1977 by-election	Andrew MacKay	Conservative
1979	Terry Davis	Labour
1983	constituency abolished	

== Election results ==
=== Elections in the 1950s ===
General election 1950: Birmingham Stechford
Party	Candidate	Votes	%	±%
Labour	Roy Jenkins	33,077	58.5	
Conservative	Edith Pitt	20,699	36.6	
Liberal	Sydney Walter Haslam	2,789	5.0	
Majority		12,378	21.9	
Turnout		56,565	83.4	
Labour win (new seat)				

General election 1951: Birmingham Stechford
Party	Candidate	Votes	%	±%
Labour	Roy Jenkins	34,355	59.5	+1.0
Conservative	Edith Pitt	23,384	40.5	+3.9
Majority		10,971	19.0	−2.9
Turnout		57,739	81.4	−2.0
Labour hold		Swing		

General election 1955: Birmingham Stechford
Party	Candidate	Votes	%	±%
Labour	Roy Jenkins	23,358	58.4	−1.1
Conservative	Joseph Morris Bailey	16,618	41.6	+1.1
Majority		6,740	16.8	−2.2
Turnout		39,976	72.7	−8.7
Labour hold		Swing		

General election 1959: Birmingham Stechford
Party	Candidate	Votes	%	±%
Labour	Roy Jenkins	21,919	53.6	−4.8
Conservative	Joseph Morris Bailey	18,996	46.4	+4.8
Majority		2,923	7.2	−9.6
Turnout		40,915	73.5	+0.8
Labour hold		Swing		

=== Elections in the 1960s ===
General election 1964: Birmingham Stechford
Party	Candidate	Votes	%	±%
Labour	Roy Jenkins	22,421	56.8	+3.2
Conservative	David Knox	17,033	43.2	−3.2
Majority		5,388	13.6	+6.4
Turnout		39,454	71.0	−2.5
Labour hold		Swing		

General election 1966: Birmingham Stechford
Party	Candidate	Votes	%	±%
Labour	Roy Jenkins	24,597	64.2	+7.4
Conservative	David Knox	12,727	33.2	−10.0
Communist	William Dunn	998	2.6	New
Majority		11,871	31.0	+17.4
Turnout		38,322	70.2	−0.8
Labour hold		Swing		

=== Elections in the 1970s ===
General election 1970: Birmingham Stechford
Party	Candidate	Votes	%	±%
Labour	Roy Jenkins	22,559	56.2	−8.0
Conservative	John B Stevens	15,848	39.5	+6.3
National Democratic	Douglas Hardy	1,483	3.6	New
Communist	Sidney Pegg	298	0.8	−1.8
Majority		6,711	16.7	−14.3
Turnout		40,188	63.8	−6.4
Labour hold		Swing		

General election February 1974: Birmingham Stechford
Party	Candidate	Votes	%	±%
Labour	Roy Jenkins	23,704	53.1	−3.1
Conservative	David John Wedgwood	13,472	30.1	−9.6
Liberal	Graham Gopsill	7,221	16.2	New
Workers Revolutionary	Royston Bull	280	0.6	New
Majority		10,232	23.0	+6.3
Turnout		44,677	72.1	+8.3
Labour hold		Swing		

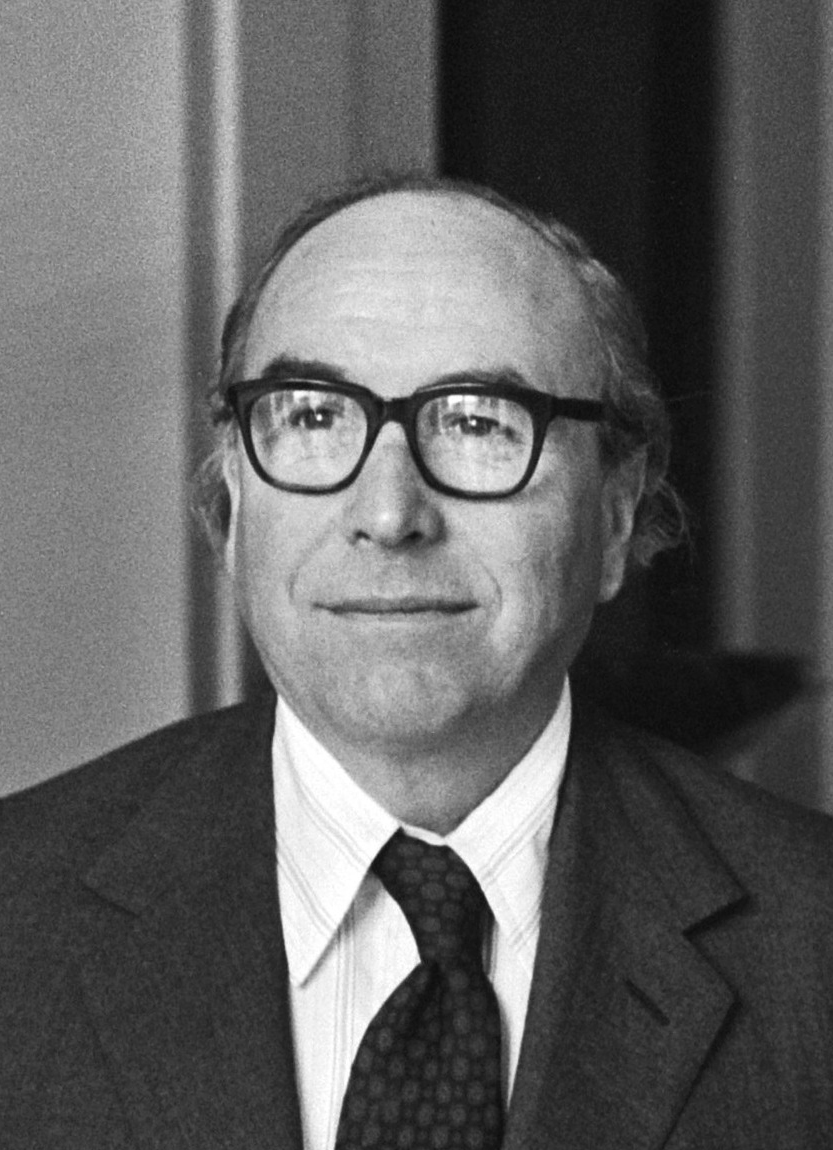
Roy Jenkins

General election October 1974: Birmingham Stechford
Party	Candidate	Votes	%	±%
Labour	Roy Jenkins	23,075	57.6	+4.5
Conservative	David John Wedgwood	11,152	27.8	−2.3
Liberal	Graham Gopsill	5,860	14.6	−1.6
Majority		11,923	29.8	+6.8
Turnout		40,087	64.1	−8.0
Labour hold		Swing		

1977 Birmingham Stechford by-election
Party	Candidate	Votes	%	±%
Conservative	Andrew MacKay	15,731	43.4	+15.6
Labour	Terence Davis	13,782	38.0	−19.6
National Front	Andrew Brons	2,955	8.2	New
Liberal	Graham Gopsill	2,901	8.0	−6.6
International Marxist	Brian Heron	494	1.4	New
Socialist Workers	Paul Foot	377	1.0	New
Majority		1,949	5.4	N/A
Turnout		36,240		
Conservative gain from Labour		Swing		

General election 1979: Birmingham Stechford
Party	Candidate	Votes	%	±%
Labour	Terry Davis	21,166	48.4	−9.2
Conservative	Andrew MacKay	19,517	44.6	+16.8
Liberal	Graham Gopsill	2,349	5.4	−9.2
National Front	F. Russell	698	1.6	New
Majority		1,649	3.8	−26.0
Turnout		43,730	71.6	+7.5
Labour hold		Swing		

Parliament of the United Kingdom
Preceded by Cardiff South East	Constituency represented by the chancellor of the Exchequer; 1967–1970	Succeeded by Enfield West
