= Hal Miller (politician) =

British politician (1929–2015)

Sir Hal Miller DL

Member of Parliament for Bromsgrove (Bromsgrove and Redditch 1974–1983)
- In office 28 February 1974 – 16 March 1992
- Preceded by: New constituency
- Succeeded by: Roy Thomason

District Officer of Tsuen Wan
- In office 10 October 1958 – 8 May 1961
- Preceded by: Position established
- Succeeded by: Steuart Alfred Webb-Johnson

Personal details
- Born: 6 March 1929
- Died: 21 March 2015 (aged 86)
- Party: Conservative
- Spouse(s): Fiona McDermid Jacqueline Roe (m. 1976)
- Children: 6
- Parents: Jack Duppa-Miller (father); Barbara Buckmaster (mother)
- Education: Eton College
- Alma mater: Merton College, Oxford; University of London

Sir Hilary Duppa Miller DL (6 March 1929 – 21 March 2015) was a British Conservative Party politician.

== Early life ==
He was the son of Lieutenant-Commander Jack Duppa-Miller, GC, and Barbara Miller (née Barbara Buckmaster, daughter of Stanley Buckmaster, 1st Viscount Buckmaster, a former Lord Chancellor). Educated at Eton College, Miller graduated from Merton College, Oxford in 1956 and the University of London in 1962, and then entered colonial service in Hong Kong.

== Parliamentary career ==
Miller unsuccessfully fought Barrow-in-Furness in 1970, and Bromsgrove in a 1971 by-election. He served as Member of Parliament (MP) for Bromsgrove and Redditch from February 1974 to 1983, and for Bromsgrove from 1983 until he retired in 1992. He is a former vice-chairman of the Conservative Party.

== Post-Parliament ==
After retiring from politics, he joined the Society of Motor Manufacturers and Traders (SMMT), the trade association of the motor industry in the UK, as its chief executive. He modernised and transformed the somewhat staid society by introducing and implementing a strategy of commercialisation.

After a four-year term, he resigned from SMMT to become managing director and later chairman of Cosmopolitan Textiles Limited, a UK-based subsidiary of the Hong Kong textile conglomerate Mingley Corporation with a brief to take the company into the auto industry. This was achieved successfully as a second tier supplier of patented substrates, mainly for headliners.

In 2005, he became a key supporter of Project Kimber. This had been formed to keep MG sportscars British after MG Rover's entry into administration in April of that year. Following the surprise sale of the entire assets of MG Rover and its subsidiary Powertrain Limited by the administrators, PricewaterhouseCoopers, to Nanjing Automotive Corporation against letters of credit to the reported value of £55m on 22 July 2005, Project Kimber developed a new business plan. This focussed on a key element of the original MG plan, which was to acquire the rights to produce and sell a rebranded and re-engineered version of the successful smart roadster, that had sold at a rate of 15,000 cars per annum in Europe for the previous two years, from DaimlerChrysler.

== Personal life ==
Miller was twice married: in 1956 to Fiona McDermid, with whom he had four children, and in 1976 to Jacqueline Roe, with whom he had two children. He was appointed a Deputy Lieutenant (DL) of Worcestershire in 2000. His brothers were Michael Miller, a QC who died in 2008, and David Miller, a Classicist, who died in 2025.

Parliament of the United Kingdom
New constituency	Member of Parliament for Bromsgrove and Redditch; Feb. 1974–1983	Constituency abolished
New constituency	Member of Parliament for Bromsgrove; 1983–1992	Succeeded by Roy Thomason
