= Stephen Tuckwell =

British sailor

Stephen John Tuckwell
- Born: 4 June 1897; Guildford, Surrey
- Died: 2 October 1966 (aged 69); Sompting, Lancing
- Military career
- Allegiance: United Kingdom
- Branch: Royal Navy
- Service years: 1915–1927; 1939–1945
- Rank: Able Seaman
- Service number: P/J.166122
- Units: HMS Vernon; HMS Mirtle
- Conflicts: First World War; Second World War: The Blitz
- Awards: George Cross; King's Commendation for Brave Conduct

Stephen John Tuckwell, GC (4 June 1897 – 2 October 1966) was a sailor in the Royal Navy who awarded the George Cross for his "great gallantry and undaunted devotion to duty" in bomb disposal work during the Blitz of late 1940. He was attached to HMS Vernon and rendered many unexploded devices safe, including several parachute mines which fell onto the bank of the River Roding in Essex.

== George Cross ==
AB Tuckwell worked closely with Sub-Lieutenant John Miller defusing and rendering safe numerous enemy bombs and mines. They were both awarded the George Cross for dealing with a parachute mine that had fallen into the soft mud bank of the Roding River, which runs into Barking Creek.

Miller commandeered a canoe and having put this on a fire-float with the UXB kit, he and Tuckwell ventured out into the river. They then left the River Fire Service fire-float and went on in the canoe, until they sighted the black rim of the mine which was stuck in the mud by the nose.

Tuckwell refused Miller's a suggestion that he should retire to a place of safety. He pointed out that as Miller would be working under at least a foot of water he would need someone to hand him the tools. They managed to get out one fuse, but could not reach the other, so appealed to several crane-drivers who had come to see what was happening, and they at once volunteered to help. The two experts got back into the water, put ropes round the mine, and with the assistance of the crane-drivers, the huge cylinder was dragged slowly out of the creek, over the muddy bank and up on to the wharf. The final stages of the operation were then completed.

His award was cited in the London Gazette of 14 January 1941, reading:

The King has been graciously pleased to approve the award of the GEORGE CROSS for great gallantry and undaunted devotion to duty, to: — Able Seaman Stephen John Tuckwell, P/J.166122.
