= 1971 Bromsgrove by-election =

UK Parliamentary by-election

← 1970	27 May 1971	1983 →

Constituency of Bromsgrove
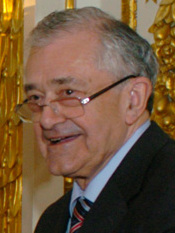
	First party	Second party
		Con
Candidate	Terry Davis	Hal Miller
Party	Labour	Conservative
Popular vote	29,809	27,941
Percentage	51.62%	48.38%
Swing	▲10.09%	▼10.09%
MP before election
James Dance
Conservative
Subsequent MP
Terry Davis
Labour

The 1971 Bromsgrove by-election was a parliamentary by-election held in the United Kingdom on 27 May 1971 for the Bromsgrove constituency in Worcestershire. The vacancy was caused by the death of Conservative Member of Parliament (MP) James Dance. The seat was won by the opposition Labour Party in a by-election that saw only the two major parties participating.

== Result ==
Bromsgrove by-Election, 1971
Party	Candidate	Votes	%	±%
Labour	Terry Davis	29,809	51.62	+10.09
Conservative	Hal Miller	27,941	48.38	−10.09
Majority		1,868	3.24	N/A
Turnout		57,750		
Labour gain from Conservative		Swing	+10.09	

== Previous election ==
General election 1970: Bromsgrove
Party	Candidate	Votes	%	±%
Conservative	James Dance	37,544	58.47	+5.45
Labour	Terry Davis	26,670	41.53	−5.45
Majority		10,874	16.94	+10.90
Turnout		64,214	76.51	−3.39
Conservative hold		Swing	+5.35	
