= Bromsgrove (constituency) =

Parliamentary constituency in the United Kingdom, 1983 onwards

Coordinates: 52.4°N 2.1°W

- County constituency for the House of Commons
- Interactive map of boundaries from 1983
- Boundary of Bromsgrove in West Midlands region
- County: Worcestershire
- Population: 93,637 (2011 census)
- Electorate: 75,305 (2023)
- Major settlements: Bromsgrove, Hagley, Alvechurch

Current constituency
- Created: 1983
- Member of Parliament: Bradley Thomas (Conservative)
- Seats: One
- Created from: Bromsgrove & Redditch

1950–1974
- Seats: One
- Type of constituency: County constituency
- Created from: Kidderminster
- Replaced by: Bromsgrove & Redditch

Bromsgrove is a constituency in Worcestershire, represented in the House of Commons of the UK Parliament since 2024 by Bradley Thomas of the Conservative Party.

== Constituency profile ==
The Bromsgrove constituency is located in Worcestershire and is coterminous with the Bromsgrove local government district. It includes the town of Bromsgrove, with a population of around 35,000, and the rural areas to its north and east. Other settlements in the constituency include the villages of Wythall, Catshill, Hagley, Alvechurch and other smaller villages. Bromsgrove grew rapidly during the Industrial Revolution as a centre for nail production. Today many of the town's residents work in nearby Birmingham. Most of the constituency is affluent, with many parts falling within the top 10% least-deprived areas in the country.

Compared to national averages, residents of the constituency are older, wealthier, more religious and more likely to work in professional jobs. White people make up 93% of the population. At the local council level (district and county), the town of Bromsgrove is mostly represented by Labour Party and Liberal Democrat councillors, whilst the rural areas elected mostly Conservative councillors with some Reform UK and independent representation. A majority of voters (55%) in the constituency supported leaving the European Union in the 2016 referendum.

== Boundaries ==
1950–1974: The Urban Districts of Bromsgrove and Redditch, and the Rural District of Bromsgrove. The constituency was renamed Bromsgrove and Redditch in 1974, but the boundaries remained unchanged until 1983.

1983–present: The District of Bromsgrove.

The 2023 review of Westminster constituencies left the boundaries unchanged.

The constituency covers the same area as Bromsgrove District Council in north Worcestershire, with twenty civil parishes, although the town of Bromsgrove itself is unparished. It includes the villages of Alvechurch, Barnt Green, Belbroughton, Blackwell, Clent, Cofton Hackett, Hagley, Hollywood, Lickey, Marlbrook, Rubery, Tardebigge, and Wythall.

== History ==
The borough of Bromsgrove returned two members (Thomas Rassall and Thomas Barneford) to the original Model Parliament in 1295. However, borough status appeared lost when no other member was sent to any subsequent parliament under that status.

Since its split from the neighbouring Redditch Constituency in 1983, it has returned a Conservative Member of Parliament (MP).

The MP from 1997 to 2010, Julie Kirkbride, announced on 28 May 2009 that she would be standing down as an MP at the next General Election in light of the expenses scandal. Her resignation was confirmed in December 2009, after an attempt to withdraw it.

The winner of the 2010 election, Sajid Javid (formerly the youngest Vice President of Chase Manhattan Bank and a Deutsche Bank board director) held ministerial roles in Treasury as Economic Secretary and Financial Secretary, as well as Cabinet posts as Culture Secretary, Business Secretary, Communities Secretary, Home Secretary, Chancellor of the Exchequer and most recently as Health Secretary. He stood down from Parliament at the 2024 dissolution having announced this intent in December 2022. His place was taken by fellow Conservative Bradley Thomas.

== Members of Parliament ==
=== MPs 1950–1974 ===
Election	Member	Party
1950	Michael Higgs	Conservative
1955	James Dance	Conservative
1971 by-election	Terry Davis	Labour
Feb 1974	constituency abolished: see Bromsgrove & Redditch	

=== MPs since 1983 ===
Election	Member	Party	Notes
1983	Hal Miller	Conservative	
1992	Roy Thomason	Conservative	
1997	Julie Kirkbride	Conservative	Shadow Secretary of State for Culture, Media and Sport (2003–2004)
2010	Sajid Javid	Conservative	Secretary of State for Culture, Media and Sport (2014–2015); Secretary of State for Business, Innovation and Skills (2015–2016); Secretary of State for Communities and Local Government (2016–2018); Home Secretary (2018–2019); Chancellor of the Exchequer (2019–2020); Secretary of State for Health and Social Care (2021–2022)
2024	Bradley Thomas	Conservative	

== Elections ==
=== Elections in the 2020s ===
General election 2024: Bromsgrove
Party	Candidate	Votes	%	±%
Conservative	Bradley Thomas	16,533	32.8	−30.6
Labour	Neena Gill	13,517	26.8	+6.0
Reform	Glen Brampton	9,584	19.0	New
Liberal Democrats	David Nicholl	7,391	14.7	+2.2
Green	Talia Ellis	1,675	3.3	0.0
Independent	Sam Ammar	1,561	3.1	New
Workers Party	Aheesha Zahir	144	0.3	New
Majority		3,016	6.0	−36.6
Turnout		50,405	66.1	−6.5
Conservative hold		Swing	−18.5	

=== Elections in the 2010s ===
General election 2019: Bromsgrove
Party	Candidate	Votes	%	±%
Conservative	Sajid Javid	34,408	63.4	+1.4
Labour	Rory Shannon	11,302	20.8	−10.5
Liberal Democrats	David Nicholl	6,779	12.5	+7.9
Green	Kevin White	1,783	3.3	+1.2
Majority		23,106	42.6	+11.9
Turnout		54,272	72.6	−1.1
Conservative hold		Swing	+5.9	

General election 2017: Bromsgrove
Party	Candidate	Votes	%	±%
Conservative	Sajid Javid	33,493	62.0	+8.2
Labour	Michael Thompson	16,920	31.3	+9.1
Liberal Democrats	Neil Lewis	2,488	4.6	−0.4
Green	Giovanni Esposito	1,139	2.1	−1.2
Majority		16,573	30.7	−0.9
Turnout		54,040	73.7	+2.5
Conservative hold		Swing	−0.5	

General election 2015: Bromsgrove
Party	Candidate	Votes	%	±%
Conservative	Sajid Javid	28,133	53.8	+10.1
Labour	Tom Ebbutt	11,604	22.2	+0.4
UKIP	Stuart Cross	8,163	15.6	+9.9
Liberal Democrats	Bart Ricketts	2,616	5.0	−14.6
Green	Giovanni Esposito	1,729	3.3	New
Majority		16,529	31.6	+9.7
Turnout		52,245	71.2	+0.6
Conservative hold		Swing	+4.8	

General election 2010: Bromsgrove
Party	Candidate	Votes	%	±%
Conservative	Sajid Javid	22,558	43.7	−7.3
Labour	Sam Burden	11,250	21.8	−8.1
Liberal Democrats	Philip Ling	10,124	19.6	+4.5
UKIP	Steven Morson	2,950	5.7	+1.7
Bromsgrove Independent Conservative	Adrian Kriss	2,182	4.2	New
BNP	Elizabeth Wainwright	1,923	3.7	New
Independent	Mark France	336	0.7	New
Independent	Ken Wheatley	307	0.6	New
Majority		11,308	21.9	+0.8
Turnout		51,630	70.6	+3.0
Conservative hold		Swing	+0.4	

=== Elections in the 2000s ===
General election 2005: Bromsgrove
Party	Candidate	Votes	%	±%
Conservative	Julie Kirkbride	24,387	51.0	−0.7
Labour	David Jones	14,307	29.9	−4.0
Liberal Democrats	Sue Haswell	7,197	15.1	+3.2
UKIP	Paul Buckingham	1,919	4.0	+1.6
Majority		10,080	21.1	+3.3
Turnout		47,810	67.6	+0.5
Conservative hold		Swing	+1.6	

General election 2001: Bromsgrove
Party	Candidate	Votes	%	±%
Conservative	Julie Kirkbride	23,640	51.7	+4.5
Labour	Peter McDonald	15,502	33.9	−3.9
Liberal Democrats	Margaret Rowley	5,430	11.9	0.0
UKIP	Ian Gregory	1,112	2.4	+1.9
Majority		8,138	17.8	+8.4
Turnout		45,684	67.1	−10.0
Conservative hold		Swing	+4.2	

=== Elections in the 1990s ===
General election 1997: Bromsgrove
Party	Candidate	Votes	%	±%
Conservative	Julie Kirkbride	24,620	47.2	−6.9
Labour	Peter McDonald	19,725	37.8	+7.1
Liberal Democrats	Jennette Davy	6,200	11.9	−1.9
Referendum	Diana Winsor	1,411	2.7	New
UKIP	Beatrice Wetton	251	0.5	New
Majority		3,885	9.4	−18.0
Turnout		52,207	77.1	−5.4
Conservative hold		Swing	−7.0	

General election 1992: Bromsgrove
Party	Candidate	Votes	%	±%
Conservative	Roy Thomason	31,709	54.1	−0.6
Labour	Catherine Mole	18,007	30.7	+7.4
Liberal Democrats	Alexis Cassin	8,090	13.8	−8.2
Green	John Churchman	856	1.5	New
Majority		13,702	23.4	−8.0
Turnout		58,662	82.5	+6.1
Conservative hold		Swing	−4.0	

=== Elections in the 1980s ===
General election 1987: Bromsgrove
Party	Candidate	Votes	%	±%
Conservative	Hal Miller	29,051	54.7	−1.5
Labour	Joseph Ward	12,366	23.3	+2.6
SDP	David Cropp	11,663	22.0	+0.4
Majority		16,685	31.4	−3.2
Turnout		53,080	76.4	+1.3
Conservative hold		Swing	−2.1	

General election 1983: Bromsgrove
Party	Candidate	Votes	%	±%
Conservative	Hal Miller	27,911	56.2	
SDP	James Milligan	10,736	21.6	
Labour	Gary Titley	10,280	20.7	
Ecology	John C. Churchman	716	1.5	
Majority		17,175	34.6	
Turnout		49,643	75.1	
Conservative win (new seat)				

=== Elections in the 1970s ===
1971 Bromsgrove by-election
Party	Candidate	Votes	%	±%
Labour	Terry Davis	29,809	51.62	+10.09
Conservative	Hal Miller	27,941	48.38	−10.09
Majority		1,868	3.24	N/A
Turnout		57,750		
Labour gain from Conservative		Swing	+10.09	

General election 1970: Bromsgrove
Party	Candidate	Votes	%	±%
Conservative	James Dance	37,544	58.47	+5.45
Labour	Terry Davis	26,670	41.53	−5.45
Majority		10,874	16.94	+10.90
Turnout		64,214	76.51	−3.39
Conservative hold		Swing	+5.35	

=== Elections in the 1960s ===
General election 1966: Bromsgrove
Party	Candidate	Votes	%	±%
Conservative	James Dance	32,400	53.02	+4.29
Labour	N Peter Lister	28,704	46.98	+9.67
Majority		3,696	6.04	−5.38
Turnout		51,104	79.90	+2.69
Conservative hold		Swing	−2.69	

General election 1964: Bromsgrove
Party	Candidate	Votes	%	±%
Conservative	James Dance	29,616	48.73	−9.35
Labour	N Peter Lister	22,673	37.31	−4.61
Liberal	Stewart L Stockdale	8,485	13.96	New
Majority		6,943	11.42	−5.75
Turnout		60,774	82.94	−0.60
Conservative hold		Swing	−2.67	

=== Elections in the 1950s ===
General election 1959: Bromsgrove
Party	Candidate	Votes	%	±%
Conservative	James Dance	32,473	58.08	+2.88
Labour	Christopher Norwood	23,433	41.92	−2.88
Majority		9,040	16.16	+5.76
Turnout		55,906	83.54	+1.85
Conservative hold		Swing	+2.88	

General election 1955: Bromsgrove
Party	Candidate	Votes	%	±%
Conservative	James Dance	27,461	55.20	+2.59
Labour	Lester J. George	22,287	44.80	−2.59
Majority		5,174	10.40	+5.18
Turnout		49,748	81.69	−4.79
Conservative hold		Swing	+2.59	

General election 1951: Bromsgrove
Party	Candidate	Votes	%	±%
Conservative	Michael Higgs	26,736	52.61	+8.65
Labour	Donald Chesworth	24,083	47.39	+3.81
Majority		2,653	5.22	+4.84
Turnout		50,819	86.48	+0.68
Conservative hold		Swing		

General election 1950: Bromsgrove
Party	Candidate	Votes	%	±%
Conservative	Michael Higgs	21,674	43.96	
Labour	Donald Chesworth	21,484	43.58	
Liberal	R. W. T. Hill	6,145	12.46	
Majority		190	0.38	
Turnout		49,303	85.80	
Conservative win (new seat)				

== See also ==
- parliamentary constituencies in Herefordshire and Worcestershire

== Notes ==
Parliament of the United Kingdom
Preceded by Runnymede and Weybridge	Constituency represented by the chancellor of the Exchequer; 2019–2020	Succeeded by Richmond
