= Birmingham Erdington by-election =

Birmingham Erdington by-election may refer to:

- 1936 Birmingham Erdington by-election
- 2022 Birmingham Erdington by-election
