= Margaret Prosser, Baroness Prosser =

British politician (born 1937)

The Right Honourable The Baroness Prosser OBE
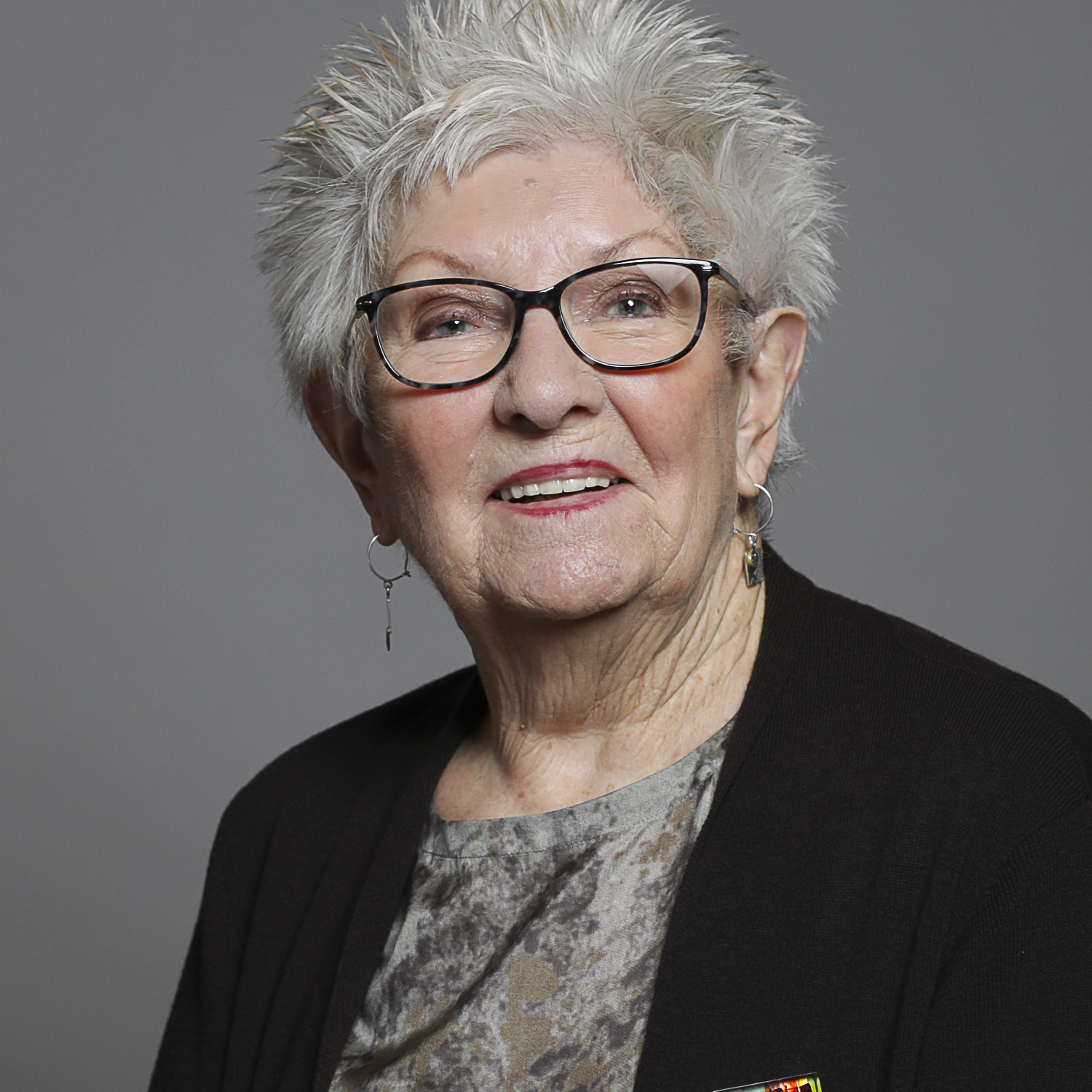

Member of the House of Lords
- Lord Temporal
- Life peerage 11 June 2004

Personal details
- Born: 22 August 1937 (age 89)

Margaret Theresa Prosser, Baroness Prosser, OBE (born 22 August 1937) is a Labour life peer and former trade unionist.

Prosser was born on 22 August 1937 in Tooting, London, the daughter of Frederick James and Lillian (née Barry) Prosser.

She was educated at St Boniface Primary School, Tooting and St Philomena's School, Carshalton. She studied as a mature student at North East London Polytechnic, qualifying with a Post-graduate Diploma in Advice and Information Studies in 1977.

Prosser became active in the Labour party and the trades union movement in the early 1970s, rising through the ranks of the Transport and General Workers' Union (T&G) to become Deputy General Secretary in 1998. She was President of the Trades Union Congress in 1996.

She was a member of the Equal Opportunities Commission 1985–92 and the Low Pay Commission 2000–05. She was appointed an Officer of the Order of the British Empire (OBE) in the 1997 Birthday Honours. From 1996 to 2001 she was Treasurer of the Labour Party. From 2002 to 2006 she was Chair of the Women's National Commission.

On 11 June 2004, she was created Baroness Prosser, of Battersea in the London Borough of Wandsworth. From 1 November 2004 to 31 October 2010 she was a Non-Executive Director of Royal Mail plc.

From 2006 to 2012 she served as Deputy Chair of the Commission for Equality and Human Rights. In 2012 she published her autobiography Your Seat is at the End, written with Greg Watts and with a foreword by Tony Blair. As of 2019, Prosser is a Chair of The Board of Trustees of the Industry and Parliament Trust, which works to promote an understanding of business amongst parliamentarians and policymakers.

She is a director of Progress Limited, a political think-tank and registered charity.

In 2020 she brought a House of Lords private member's bill for equal pay in the workplace, supported by the Fawcett Society.

Party political offices
Preceded by Tom Burlison	Treasurer of the Labour Party; 1996–2001	Succeeded by Jimmy Elsby
Trade union offices
Preceded by Marie Patterson	Women's Officer of the Transport and General Workers' Union; 1985–1998	Succeeded by Diana Holland
Preceded by Jack Adams	Deputy General Secretary of the Transport and General Workers' Union; 1998–2002	Succeeded by Tony Woodley
Preceded by Leif Mills	President of the Trades Union Congress; 1996	Succeeded by Tony Dubbins
