= 1994 Special Honours =

Award from the British honours system made within royal and operational prerogative

As part of the British honours system, Special Honours are issued at the Monarch's pleasure at any given time. The Special Honours refer to the awards made within royal prerogative, operational honours and other honours awarded outside the New Years Honours and Birthday Honours.

== Life Peer ==
=== Baronesses ===
- Josephine Farrington, chair, Association of County Councils, Labour Member of Lancashire County Council since 1977. Chair, Education and Training Committee of the Regions and Member, Council of Europe Congress of Local and Regional Authorities.
- Patricia Elizabeth Rawlings, Member of the European Parliament for Essex South West 1989–94.
- Susan Petronella Thomas, OBE, Vice-chair, Surrey County Council and Chair of the Highways and Transport Committee.

=== Barons ===
- The Right Honourable Sir Peter Allan Renshaw Blaker, KCMG, Member of Parliament for Blackpool South 1964–92. Minister of State, Foreign and Commonwealth Office, 1979–81, and for the Armed Forces, Ministry of Defence, 1981–83. Member, Public Accounts Commission, 1987–92.
- Alfred Dubs, Director, The Refugee Council. Member of Parliament for Battersea South and for Battersea, 1979–87. Opposition Home Affairs spokesman, 1983–87.
- Derek Oliver Gladwin, CBE, former Regional Secretary (Southern Region), General and Municipal Workers Union (now the GMB) and member of the TUC General Council.
- Charles Eric Alexander Hambro, chairman, Hambros pic and Guardian Royal Exchange Assurance.
- The Right Honourable Sir Christopher James Prout, TD, QC, Member of the European Parliament for Shropshire and Stafford, 1979–94. Leader, British Conservative MEPs, 1987–94.
- Sir Michael Norman Shaw, DL, Member of Parliament, Brighouse and Spenborough, 1960–64, Scarborough and Whitby, 1966–74, Scarborough, 1974–92.
- Graham Tope, CBE, Leader of the council, London Borough of Sutton. Member of Parliament for Sutton and Cheam, 1972–74. President, London Liberal Democrats.

== Privy Counsellor ==
- Jonathan William Patrick Aitken, M.P.
- Robert Michael James Gascoyne-Cecil, Baron Cecil (commonly called Viscount Cranborne)
- Stephen James Dorrell, M.P.
- Jeremy James Hanley, M.P.
- Nicholas James Christopher Lowther, Viscount Ullswater

== Order of the Garter ==
- The Right Honourable John Francis Harcourt Baring, Baron Ashburton, K.C.V.O.
- The Right Honourable Robert Leigh-Pemberton, Baron Kingsdown.
- The Right Honourable Sir Ninian Martin Stephen, A.K., G.C.M.G., G.C.V.O., K.B.E.

== Royal Victorian Order ==
=== Knight Grand Cross ===
- Sir Charles Matthew Farrer, K.C.V.O.

== Knight Bachelor ==
- Graham Frank James Bright, M.P.
- The Honourable Mr. Justice (David Wolfe) Keene.
- The Honourable Mark Alexander Lennox-Boyd, M.P.
- Cyril Irvine Patnick, O.B.E., M.P.
- The Honourable Mr. Justice (Robert) Walker.
