= 1936 Birmingham Erdington by-election =

UK Parliamentary by-election

| ← 1935 | 20 October 1936 | 1945 → |

Constituency of Birmingham Erdington
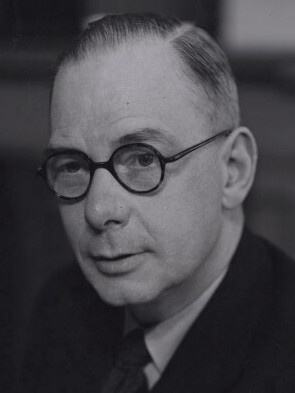
| | First party | Second party |
|---|---|---|
| | Con |
| Candidate | John Cecil-Wright | Charles Simmons |
| Party | Conservative | Labour |
| Popular vote | 27,068 | 20,834 |
| Percentage | 56.5% | 43.5% |
| Swing | ▼1.8% | ▲6.1% |
MP before election
John Eales
Conservative
Elected MP
John Cecil-Wright
Conservative

The 1936 Birmingham Erdington by-election was held on 20 October 1936. The by-election was held due to the death of the incumbent Conservative MP, John Eales. It was won by the Conservative candidate John Wright.

Birmingham Erdington by-election, 1936
| Party | Candidate | Votes | % | ±% |
|---|---|---|---|---|
| Conservative | John Wright | 27,068 | 56.5 | −1.8 |
| Labour | Charles Simmons | 20,834 | 43.5 | +6.1 |
| Majority | | 6,234 | 13.0 | −7.9 |
| Turnout | | 47,902 | | |
| Conservative hold | | Swing | | |
