= Jack Dromey =

British politician and trade unionist (1948–2022)

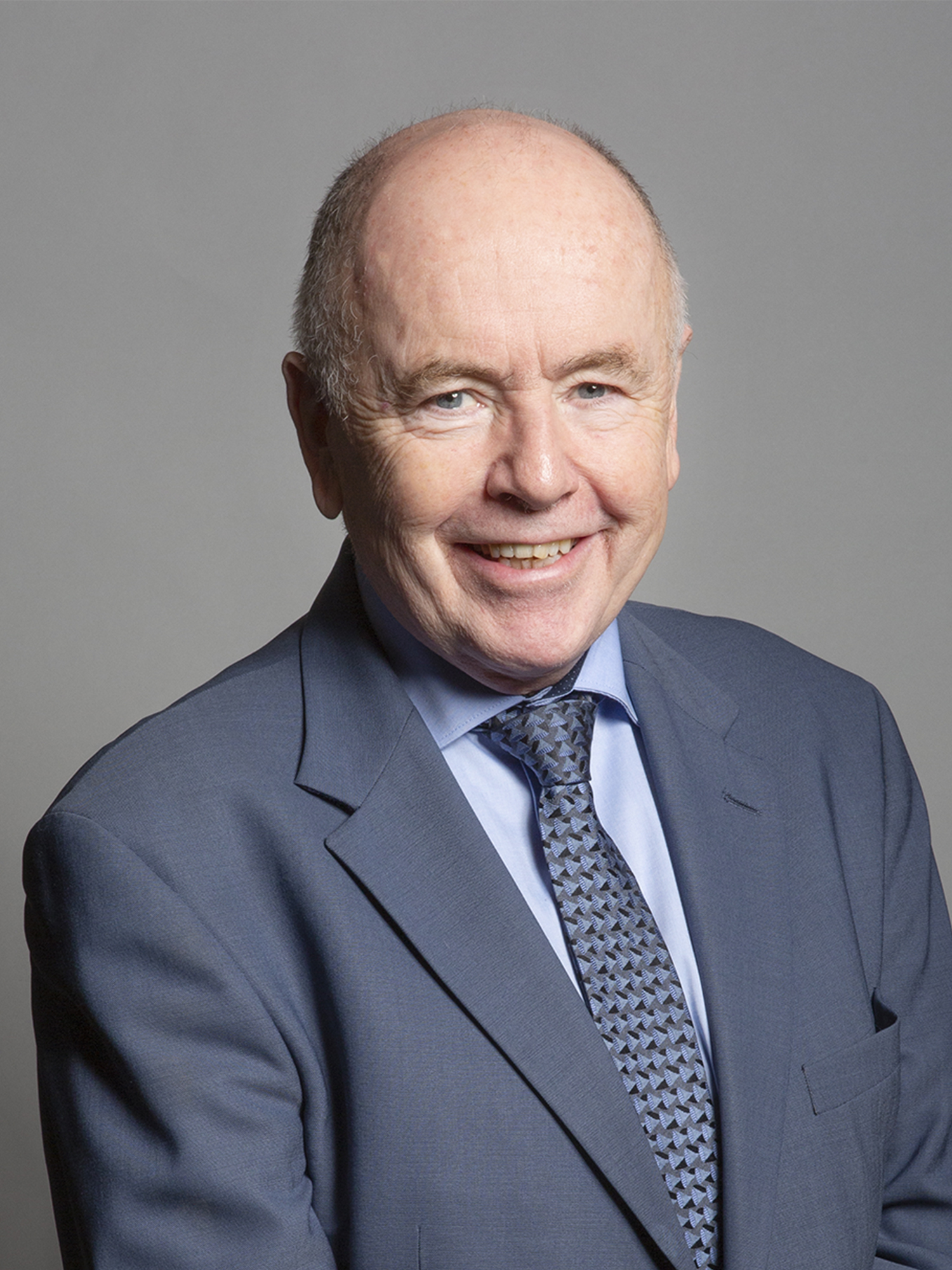
- Official portrait, 2019

Member of Parliament for Birmingham Erdington
- In office 6 May 2010 – 7 January 2022
- Preceded by: Siôn Simon
- Succeeded by: Paulette Hamilton

Treasurer of the Labour Party
- In office 30 September 2004 – 26 September 2010
- Leader: Tony Blair; Gordon Brown; Harriet Harman (acting)
- Preceded by: Jimmy Elsby
- Succeeded by: Diana Holland

Deputy General Secretary of Unite (Note: Transport and General Workers' Union (2003–2007))
- In office 2003–2010
- General Secretary: Tony Woodley; Derek Simpson
- Preceded by: Tony Woodley
- Succeeded by: Office abolished
Shadow portfolios
2010–2013	Housing
2013–2016	Policing
2016–2018	Labour
2018–2021	Pensions
2021	Paymaster General
2021–2022	Immigration

Personal details
- Born: John Eugene Joseph Dromey; 29 September 1948 Brent, Middlesex, England
- Died: 7 January 2022 (aged 73) Birmingham, England
- Party: Labour
- Spouse: Harriet Harman (m. 1982)
- Children: 3
- Education: Cardinal Vaughan Memorial School

John Eugene Joseph Dromey (29 September 1948 – 7 January 2022) was a British politician and trade unionist who served as Member of Parliament (MP) for Birmingham Erdington from 2010 to 2022. A member of the Labour Party, he served as Deputy General Secretary of the Transport and General Workers' Union and later Unite from 2003 to 2010.

== Early life and career ==
John Eugene Joseph Dromey was born on 29 September 1948 to Irish parents in Brent, Middlesex. He was raised in Kilburn and educated at the Cardinal Vaughan Memorial School, then a grammar school.

In the early 1970s, while working at the Brent Law Centre, Dromey was elected as chairman of his branch of the Transport and General Workers' Union (TGWU) and as a delegate to the Brent Trades Council. In 1973 he took a leading role in planning the occupation of Centre Point, along with prominent Housing and Direct Action campaigners Jim Radford and Ron Bailey. This high-profile event was designed to highlight and publicise the perceived injustice of London's most prominent (and tallest) building development – which included a number of luxury flats – remaining empty for consecutive years while tens of thousands of people languished on housing waiting lists across the capital. The event was postponed in 1973 but eventually carried out successfully in January the following year.

Dromey built a reputation as an effective speaker and organiser in the trade union movement and through his involvement with Brent Trades Council and the Greater London Association of Trades Councils, who sent him as a delegate to the South East Regional Council of the Trades Union Congress. Dromey attended the 1976 "Luanda Trial" a.k.a. "Mercenaries' Trial" in Luanda, Angola, as an "observer".

As secretary of the local Trades Council he also had a prominent role in supporting the strike at the Grunwick film processing laboratory which lasted from 1976 to 1978. The mostly-female Asian workforce at Grunwick went on strike to demand that company boss George Ward recognise their union; instead, Ward dismissed the strikers, leading to a two-year-long confrontation involving mass picketing and some violence. The strike was ultimately unsuccessful.

Dromey was appointed deputy general secretary of the TGWU, having lost the 2003 election for general secretary to Tony Woodley by a wide margin.

== Parliamentary career ==
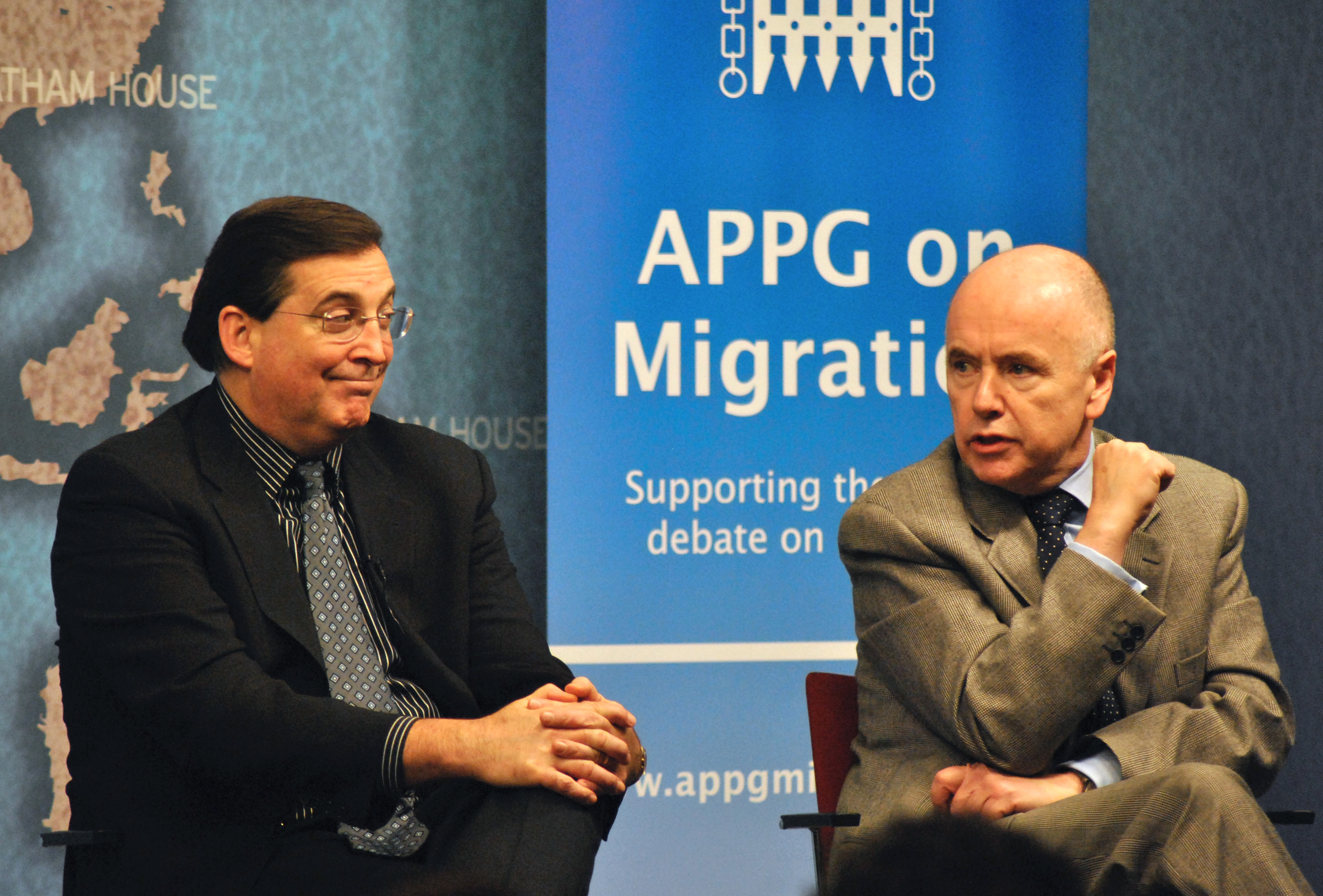
Dromey (right) with Frank Sharry at Chatham House in 2011

Dromey first sought to stand for Labour at the 1997 general election but failed to make the shortlist for the Pontefract and Castleford constituency.

Dromey again sought a safe seat in 2007, when there were plans for a general election to be called. Peter Watt, the then Labour general secretary, later revealed that Unite the Union had given £1 million in donations on the assumption of Dromey gaining nomination for the safe seat of Wolverhampton North East.

In August 2009, it was revealed that senior Labour figures thought Dromey was likely to be selected in the Leyton and Wanstead constituency for the 2010 general election. The chair of Leyton and Wanstead Constituency Labour Party said he would be "somewhat aggrieved" were Dromey selected and Dromey's wife Harriet Harman had campaigned for all-women shortlists in safe seats. The party's candidates for the constituency were due to be announced in November 2009, though this was delayed for at least two months, with The Daily Telegraph alleging that the announcement was going to be made at the last possible minute so Dromey could be imposed as the candidate using emergency rules. It was revealed in January 2010 that the seat would not be subject to an all-woman shortlist, but the Constituency Labour Party subsequently selected former Hornchurch MP John Cryer as its candidate on 27 February.

In February 2010, Siôn Simon, Labour MP for Birmingham Erdington since 2001, announced his intention to stand down at the imminent general election. The NEC of the Labour Party swiftly announced that Birmingham Erdington would have an open shortlist. Dromey was confirmed to have made that shortlist. On 27 February 2010, it was confirmed that Dromey had been selected as the Labour Party candidate for Birmingham Erdington. He was elected on 6 May 2010.

Dromey joined the Labour frontbench, under leader Ed Miliband, as Shadow Minister for Housing from 2010 until 2013 when he became Shadow Minister for Policing. He remained in post following Jeremy Corbyn's election as leader until his resignation in June 2016, but returned to the frontbench as Shadow Minister for Labour in October 2016. He was appointed Shadow Minister for Pensions in 2018, and continued to serve in the role under Keir Starmer until 2021, when he joined the shadow Cabinet Office team as Shadow Paymaster General. He was later appointed Shadow Immigration minister in the December reshuffle, serving in the role for a month before his sudden death in January 2022.

In November 2011, John Lyon, the Parliamentary Commissioner for Standards, launched an investigation into allegations that Dromey had failed to declare thousands of pounds in salary. Dromey's entry in the register of Members' interests stated he had declined his salary from Unite since entering Parliament. However, in October 2011 he changed his entry to state "Between the General Election and 30 October 2010, I received £27,867 in salary." Dromey apologised to the House of Commons on 19 January 2012, in relation to this mistake.

He supported Owen Smith in the failed attempt to replace Jeremy Corbyn in the 2016 Labour leadership election.

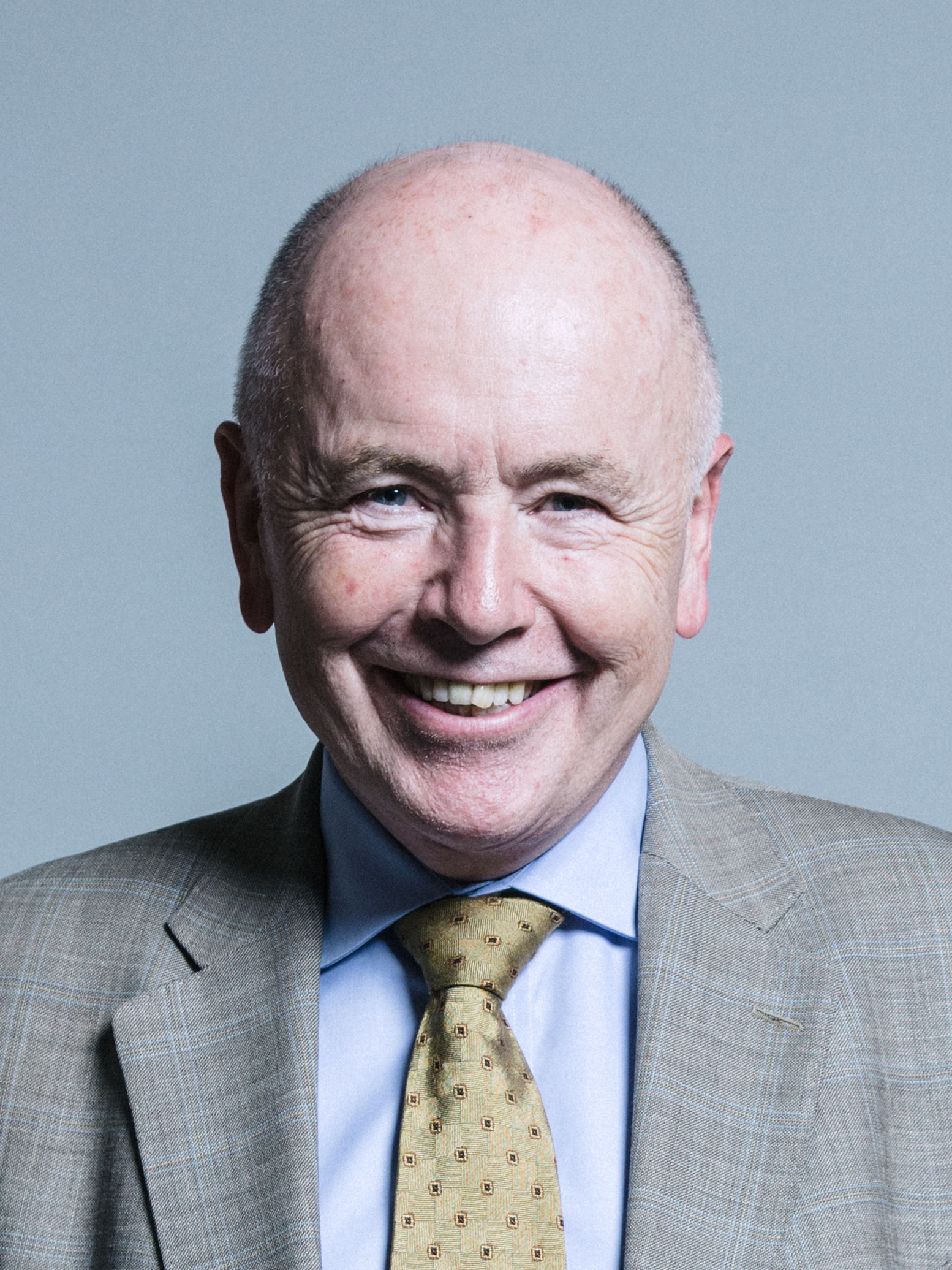
Official portrait, 2017

Dromey retained his seat in the 2019 general election; although his majority fell to ten percentage points, he won more than 50 per cent of the vote.

In January 2021, Dromey moved to the Shadow Cabinet Office team, led by Rachel Reeves, as Shadow Paymaster General. In December 2021, during the reshuffle of the shadow ministerial team, he became Shadow Minister for Immigration. However, as he died a month later, he only made one parliamentary speech in this capacity in a Westminster Hall debate on the Afghan resettlement scheme just the day before his death.

=== Controversies ===
Dromey was a member of the executive committee of the National Council for Civil Liberties (NCCL; now Liberty) in the 1970s during a period when the Paedophile Information Exchange (PIE) had taken out corporate membership of NCCL. Dromey denied supporting PIE or its aims, stating that he actively opposed the links between the two groups and voted for the expulsion of the group at the NCCL Annual General Meeting.

On 15 March 2006, during the Cash for Peerages scandal, Dromey said he was unaware – despite being the Labour Party treasurer – of £3.5 million loaned to the Labour Party in 2005 by three persons who were subsequently nominated for life peerages (Chai Patel, Sir David Garrard, and Barry Townsley). Loans made on commercial terms, as was claimed to be the case here, are not subject to reporting requirements to the Electoral Commission.

Dromey stated publicly that neither he nor Labour's elected National Executive Committee (NEC) chairman, Sir Jeremy Beecham, had knowledge of or involvement in the loans, and that he had become aware of them when he read about them in the newspapers. Dromey stated that he was regularly consulted about conventional bank loans. As well as announcing his own investigation, he called on the Electoral Commission to investigate the issue of political parties taking out loans from non-commercial sources. His report was discussed by the NEC on 21 March 2006.

Dromey was caught up in a further financial scandal in 2007, as he was responsible for party finances, which included more than £630,000 in illegal donations from David Abrahams. Dromey again claimed to know nothing of the donations, with critics wondering why he had not examined the issue more closely. Harriet Harman, Dromey's wife, was also caught up in the affair, as her staff had solicited and accepted donations totalling £5,000.

== Personal life and death ==
Dromey married Harriet Harman in 1982 in the Borough of Brent, after meeting her on the picket line of the Grunwick dispute in 1977; Harman was legal advisor to the Grunwick Strike Committee. They had three children: Harry (born February 1983), Joseph (born November 1984) and Amy (born January 1987), who has taken Harman's surname. Labour colleague Patricia Hewitt is godmother to one of their children. Their son Joe was a councillor in the London Borough of Lewisham between 2014 and 2021, and has served as General Secretary of the Fabian Society since January 2025. They had a house in Suffolk, in addition to a home in Herne Hill, south London.

The couple decided to send their children to selective schools, the subject of negative comments at the time. Dromey served for ten years on the executive of the National Council for Civil Liberties, a pressure group for which Harman worked as legal officer. Dromey, whose parents were from counties Cork and Tipperary, was a strong supporter of Irish causes in Parliament and in his Birmingham constituency, and a regular attender at the city's yearly St Patrick's Day parades.

Dromey died from heart failure at his flat in Birmingham on 7 January 2022, at the age of 73. Former prime minister Tony Blair described Dromey as a "stalwart of the Labour and trade union movement", while Gordon Brown said he had lost "a friend, colleague and great humanitarian who never stopped fighting for social justice". The flags of Parliament were lowered to half-mast, and House of Commons speaker Lindsay Hoyle said MPs were "all in disbelief that the life-force that was Jack Dromey has died".

His funeral was held on 31 January 2022 at St Margaret's Church, Westminster. Those in attendance included Hoyle, Blair, Brown, Ed Balls, Andrew Marr, and MPs Ed Miliband, Lisa Nandy and Jacob Rees-Mogg. Speaking at the service, Brown said that Dromey "made and remade history".

== Notes ==
Parliament of the United Kingdom
Preceded by Siôn Simon	Member of Parliament for Birmingham Erdington; 2010–2022	Succeeded by Paulette Hamilton
Trade union offices
Preceded by Tony Woodley	Deputy General Secretary of the Transport and General Workers' Union; 2003–2007	Position abolished
New title Position established	Deputy General Secretary of Unite; 2007–2010; Served alongside: Graham Goddard (2007–2009)	?
Party political offices
Preceded by Jimmy Elsby	Treasurer of the Labour Party; 2004–2010	Succeeded by Diana Holland
