= Tom Burlison =

English footballer and politician

The Right Honourable The Lord Burlison DL

Lord-in-Waiting Government Whip
- In office 28 January 1999 – 11 June 2000
- Monarch: Elizabeth II
- Prime Minister: Tony Blair
- Preceded by: The Lord Hoyle
- Succeeded by: The Lord Davies of Oldham

Treasurer of the Labour Party
- In office 1992–1996
- Leader: John Smith; Margaret Beckett (Acting); Tony Blair
- Preceded by: Sam McCluskie
- Succeeded by: Margaret Prosser

Member of the House of Lords
- Lord Temporal
- Life peerage 21 October 1997 – 20 May 2008

Personal details
- Born: Thomas Henry Burlison; 23 May 1936 Edmondsley, England
- Died: 20 May 2008 (aged 71) Gateshead, England
- Party: Labour
Association football career
- Position: Wing-half
Senior career*
Years	Team	Apps	(Gls)
1954–1957	Lincoln City	0	(0)
1957–1964	Hartlepool United	148	(5)
1964–1965	Darlington	26	(2)
- * Club domestic league appearances and goals as of 16:48, 4 August 2008 (UTC)

Thomas Henry Burlison, Baron Burlison, DL (23 May 1936 – 20 May 2008) was a British footballer, GMB trade unionist and Treasurer of the Labour Party. He was the first former professional footballer to take a seat in the House of Lords.

Burlison was born in Edmondsley, County Durham, the son of a miner, Robert Burlison, and his wife, Georgina. He was educated in Edmondsley and worked as a panel beater from 1951 to 1957, joining the General and Municipal Workers' Union (GMWU, later merged to form the GMB).

== Professional football ==
He was a professional footballer from 1953 to 1965 (playing for Lincoln City, Hartlepool United and Darlington). Between 1959 and 1961 he did National Service in the Royal Air Force.

== GMWU/GMB trade union ==
He became a regional officer of the GMB in Newcastle upon Tyne in 1965, and regional secretary in 1978. A polite and unassuming man with a low profile, he was an effective "fixer" behind the scenes, drawing from a base in the union's heartland in the northeast and setting many on the path to power. His staff included former Labour ministers Nick Brown and Doug Henderson, and former MEP and Labour leader in the European parliament Alan Donnelly. He was also involved in the selection of many Labour MPs, including Tony Blair and Peter Mandelson.

He was involved in the negotiations in 1982 to merge the GMWU with the Boilermakers to form the General, Municipal, Boilermakers and Allied Trades Union. He was runner-up behind John Edmonds in the election for general secretary of the GMB in 1985. The GMB merged with APEX in 1989 for form the GMB Union, and Burlison served as deputy general secretary of the merged union from 1991 to 1996.

== Labour Party ==
He was also treasurer of the Labour Party from 1992 to 1996. He was chairman of the TUC northern region for nine years. He was also a trustee of the Board of Governors of the University of Northumbria, a Deputy Lieutenant and Honorary President of Hartlepool United. He was an important moderniser on Labour's National Executive Committee in the years before the party's landslide victory at the 1997 general election.

== Baron Burlison ==
On 21 October 1997, he was created a life peer as Baron Burlison, of Rowlands Gill, in the County of Tyne and Wear. He was a working peer, and was a Lord in Waiting (a Government whip in the House of Lords) from 1999 to 2001.

Burlison married Valerie Stephenson in 1981. They had one son and one daughter.

Burlison lived in Rowlands Gill, Tyne and Wear, for at least 20 years. He died in Gateshead on 20 May 2008 at the age of 71.

Trade union offices
Preceded by Andrew Cunningham	Northern District Secretary of the GMB; 1978–1991	Succeeded by Nick Anderson
Preceded by New position	Deputy General Secretary of the GMB; 1991–1996	Succeeded by Steve Pickering
Political offices
Preceded by Sam McCluskie	Treasurer of the Labour Party; 1992–1996	Succeeded by Margaret Prosser
