= John Eales (British politician) =

British politician (1881–1936)

MP John Eales

Member of Parliament for Birmingham Erdington
- In office 27 October 1931 – 6 August 1936
- Preceded by: Charles Simmons
- Succeeded by: John Allan Cecil Wright

Personal details
- Born: John Frederick Eales; 19 January 1881 Manchester, England, United Kingdom
- Died: 6 August 1936 (aged 55) Whitby, England, United Kingdom
- Party: Conservative

John Frederick Eales (19 January 1881 – 6 August 1936) was a British lawyer and Conservative Party politician who served as a member of parliament (MP) from 1931 to 1936.

== Early life and legal career ==
He was born in Manchester, and was the son of William Eales of Luton. He served "articles" in a Luton solicitor's office, becoming a solicitor himself in 1904. He became a partner in a law firm in Coventry in the following year.

He married Emily Randall of Luton in the same year; the couple had two daughters. In 1910, he was called to the bar at the Middle Temple, and practiced on the Midland Circuit, with his Chambers in Birmingham. As his practice grew, he moved to London in 1921. In 1928, he was appointed Recorder of Coventry and in 1934 Recorder of Nottingham. In 1929, he "took silk" to become a king's counsel.

== Member of Parliament ==
Eales was an active member of the Conservative Party, and had been involved in the party's campaigns in the Coventry and Nuneaton constituencies in the 1920s. He was nominated to contest the 1931 general election at Birmingham Erdington. The seat had been lost by the Conservatives in 1929, when C J Simmons of the Labour Party had been elected. Eales benefitted from a large swing against Labour, and regained the seat with a majority of nearly 19,000 votes. At the next election four years later, he successfully defended the seat.

Eales died suddenly from a heart attack while on holiday in Whitby, Yorkshire on 6 August 1936, aged 55.

Parliament of the United Kingdom
Preceded by Charles James Simmons	Member of Parliament for Birmingham Erdington; 1931–1936	Succeeded by John Allan Cecil Wright
