= Edmondsley =

Village in County Durham, England

Coordinates: 54.835°N 1.632°W

- Location within County Durham
- Population: 543 (2011)
- OS grid reference: NZ237490
- Unitary authority: County Durham
- Ceremonial county: County Durham
- Region: North East
- Country: England
- Sovereign state: United Kingdom
- Post town: DURHAM
- Postcode district: DH7
- Dialling code: 0191
- Police: Durham
- Fire: County Durham and Darlington
- Ambulance: North East
- UK Parliament: North Durham

Edmondsley is a small village in County Durham, England. It is situated a few miles south-west of Chester-le-Street, near the villages of Craghead and Sacriston.

Coal mining once provided the village's main source of employment, but the last mines in the area had closed by the mid-1980s.

Edmondsley has one primary school and a post office. There was also a public house, the Fleece, but this closed in 2007.

== Etymology ==
The name Edmondsley is first recorded in c. 1190 in the form Edemannesleye. It appears to have come from the Old English Eadmund or *Eadmann + leah ("Edmund's clearing").

== Notable people ==
Captain Ben Clayton M.C., was an art teacher and the eldest son of the village schoolmaster John Clayton B.A., J.P. Ben Clayton lived in School House, Edmondsley and was killed at Passchendaele 16 August 1917, aged 22 years . The professional footballer and trade unionist Thomas Burlison, Baron Burlison (1936–2008) was born in Edmondsley.
