= Dick Pickering =

British trade union leader

Richard Pickering (22 September 1942 – 10 October 1996) was a British trade union leader.

Born in Manchester on 22 September 1942, Pickering became active in the local Labour Party and in the National Union of General and Municipal Workers. He began working for Manchester City Council in 1967, and soon became shop steward for the city's refuse workers, then later was elected as secretary of the union's Manchester branch. In 1982, he became the chair of the union's executive, and he was subsequently also elected to the General Council of the Trades Union Congress (TUC).

In 1987, Pickering resigned as chair of the union, by then known as the GMB, in protest at increases in membership fees and reductions in shop stewards' commission for collecting these dues. In a surprise move, he stood for the post again when a new election was held but was defeated by Olga Mean, and only won the post back in 1992. This post, which was subsequently renamed "president" of the union, brought him prominence in the trade union movement; he chaired a TUC investigation into repetitive strain injury, and he also represented the TUC to the European Economic and Social Committee.

Pickering devoted much of his spare time to supporting the Anti-Apartheid Movement, and Nelson Mandela recognized his support when the two met in 1993. Pickering also enjoyed playing and watching cricket. He died of a heart attack in 1996, shortly before he was due to become President of the TUC.

Trade union offices
Preceded by Derek Gladwin	Chair of the GMB; 1982–1987	Succeeded by James Morrell
Preceded by Olga Mean	President of the GMB; 1992–1996	Succeeded by Mary Turner
