= Birmingham Erdington =

UK Parliament constituency (since 1974)

Coordinates: 52.53°N 1.84°W

- Borough constituency for the House of Commons
- Boundaries since 2024
- Boundary of Birmingham Erdington in West Midlands region
- County: West Midlands
- Population: 97,778 (2011 census)
- Electorate: 76,856 (2023)

Current constituency
- Created: 1974
- Member of Parliament: Paulette Hamilton (Labour)
- Seats: One
- Created from: Birmingham Aston and Sutton Coldfield

1918–1955
- Seats: One
- Type of constituency: Borough constituency
- Created from: Aston Manor
- Replaced by: Birmingham Aston and Sutton Coldfield

Birmingham Erdington is a parliamentary constituency (Note: A borough constituency (for the purposes of election expenses and type of returning officer)) in Birmingham, England, represented in the House of Commons of the Parliament of the United Kingdom since 2022 by Paulette Hamilton of the Labour Party. (Note: As with all constituencies, the constituency elects one Member of Parliament (MP) by the first past the post system of election at least every five years.)

== Boundaries ==
1918–1950: The County Borough of Birmingham wards of Erdington North, Erdington South, and Washwood Heath, and part of Aston ward.

1950–1955: The County Borough of Birmingham wards of Bromford, Erdington, and Gravelly Hill.

1974–1983: The County Borough of Birmingham wards of Erdington, Gravelly Hill, and Stockland Green.

1983–1997: The City of Birmingham wards of Erdington, Kingsbury, and Stockland Green.

1997–2010: The City of Birmingham wards of Erdington, Kingsbury, Kingstanding, and Stockland Green (as they existed on 1 June 1994).

2010–2018: The City of Birmingham wards of Erdington, Kingstanding, Stockland Green, and Tyburn (as they existed on 12 April 2005).

2018–2024: Following a local government boundary review, which did not effect the parliamentary boundaries, the contents of the constituency were as follows with effect from May 2018:

- The City of Birmingham wards of Castle Vale, Erdington, Gravelly Hill, Perry Common, Pype Hayes, Stockland Green, and most of Kingstanding.

2024–present: Further to the 2023 periodic review of Westminster constituencies which came into effect for the 2024 general election, the constituency comprises:

- The City of Birmingham wards of: Castle Vale; Erdington; Gravelly Hill; Kingstanding; Oscott (polling districts OSC4, OSC5, OSC7 and OSC8); Perry Common; Pype Hayes; Stockland Green.

The remaining areas of the Kingstanding ward and the majority of the Oscott ward were transferred from Birmingham Perry Barr, bringing the electorate within the permitted range.

== Constituency profile ==
The constituency is predominantly white working class and very deprived, having a high proportion of adults of working age in a low income bracket when compared to the West Midlands as a whole. This is a mix of council estates, some of which are now private homes under the Right to Buy, the large Kingstanding estate and Castle Vale being examples, and generally more affluent suburbs which are private housing particularly towards the Sutton Coldfield border in Erdington itself, the strongest Conservative ward in the seat. Spanning to the city's green belt, the area includes for example Birmingham Spaghetti Junction motorway junction. Since the seat was recreated in 1974, only Labour MPs have been elected, although Conservative candidates reduced the majority to three figures in 1979 and 1983; both of which resulted in victories for the party as a whole nationwide. In the 2016 United Kingdom European Union membership referendum, 63% of people voted to leave the EU whilst 37% voted to remain.

== Members of Parliament ==
=== MPs 1918–1955 ===
Election	Member	Party
1918	Arthur Steel-Maitland	Conservative
1929	Charles Simmons	Labour
1931	John Eales	Conservative
1936 by-election	John Wright	Conservative
1945	Julius Silverman	Labour
1955	constituency abolished	

=== MPs since 1974 ===
Election	Member	Party
1974	Julius Silverman	Labour
1983	Robin Corbett	Labour
2001	Siôn Simon	Labour
2010	Jack Dromey	Labour
2022 by-election	Paulette Hamilton	Labour

== Elections ==
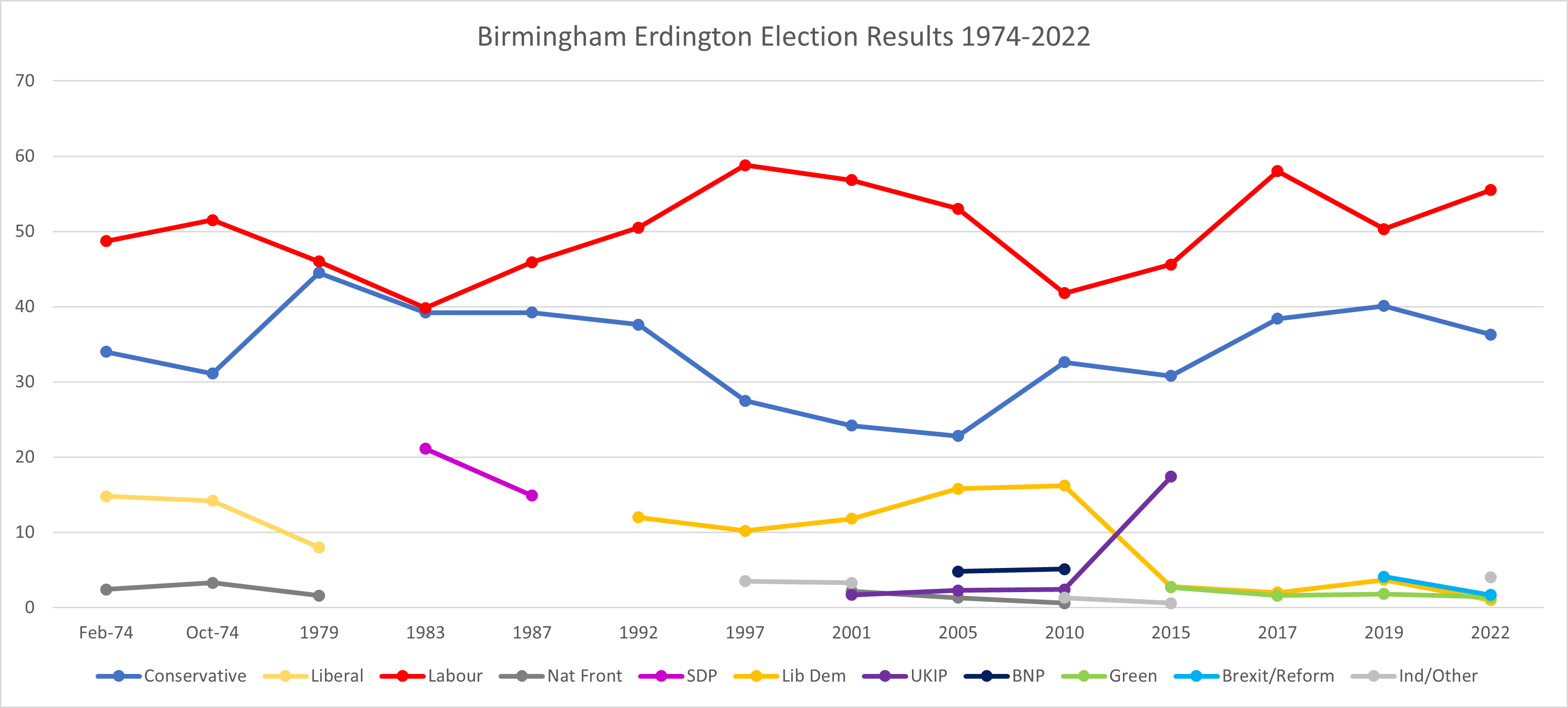

=== Elections in the 2020s ===
General election 2024: Birmingham Erdington
Party	Candidate	Votes	%	±%
Labour	Paulette Hamilton	14,774	43.3	▼6.1
Reform	Jack Brookes	7,755	22.7	▲18.7
Conservative	Steve Knee	5,402	15.8	▼25.7
Green	Karen Trench	2,452	7.2	▲5.4
Independent	Shaukat Ali	2,250	6.6	new
Liberal Democrats	Farzana Aslam	1,128	3.3	=
TUSC	Corinthia Ward	376	1.1	new
Majority		7,019	20.8	▲10.6
Turnout		34,137	44.1	▼9.9
Labour hold		Swing		

Vote share changes for the 2024 election are compared to the notional results from the 2019 election, not the 2022 by-election.

2022 Birmingham Erdington by-election
Party	Candidate	Votes	%	±%
Labour	Paulette Hamilton	9,413	55.5	+5.2
Conservative	Robert Alden	6,147	36.3	−3.8
TUSC	Dave Nellist	360	2.1	N/A
Reform	Jack Brookes	293	1.7	−2.4
Green	Siobhan Harper-Nunes	236	1.4	−0.4
Liberal Democrats	Lee Dargue	173	1.0	−2.7
Independent	Michael Lutwyche	109	0.6	N/A
CPA	Mel Mbondiah	79	0.5	N/A
Independent	Thomas O'Rourke	76	0.4	N/A
Monster Raving Loony	The Good Knight Sir NosDa	49	0.3	N/A
Independent	Clifton Holmes	14	0.1	N/A
Church of the Militant Elvis	David Bishop	8	0.0	N/A
Majority		3,266	19.2	+9.0
Turnout		17,016	27.0	−26.3
Labour hold		Swing	+4.5	

=== Elections in the 2010s ===
General election 2019: Birmingham Erdington
Party	Candidate	Votes	%	±%
Labour	Jack Dromey	17,720	50.3	−7.7
Conservative	Robert Alden	14,119	40.1	+1.7
Brexit Party	Wendy Garcarz	1,441	4.1	N/A
Liberal Democrats	Ann Holtom	1,301	3.7	+1.7
Green	Rob Grant	648	1.8	+0.2
Majority		3,601	10.2	−9.4
Turnout		35,229	53.3	−3.9
Labour hold		Swing	−4.7	

General election 2017: Birmingham Erdington
Party	Candidate	Votes	%	±%
Labour	Jack Dromey	21,571	58.0	+12.4
Conservative	Robert Alden	14,286	38.4	+7.6
Liberal Democrats	Ann Holtom	750	2.0	−0.8
Green	James Lovatt	610	1.6	−1.1
Majority		7,285	19.6	+4.8
Turnout		37,217	57.2	+3.9
Labour hold		Swing	+2.4	

General election 2015: Birmingham Erdington
Party	Candidate	Votes	%	±%
Labour	Jack Dromey	15,824	45.6	+3.8
Conservative	Robert Alden	10,695	30.8	−1.8
UKIP	Andrew Garcarz	6,040	17.4	+15.0
Liberal Democrats	Ann Holtom	965	2.8	−13.4
Green	Joe Belcher	948	2.7	N/A
TUSC	Ted Woodley	212	0.6	N/A
Majority		5,129	14.8	+5.6
Turnout		34,684	53.3	−0.2
Labour hold		Swing	+2.8	

General election 2010: Birmingham Erdington
Party	Candidate	Votes	%	±%
Labour	Jack Dromey	14,869	41.8	−11.1
Conservative	Robert Alden	11,592	32.6	+9.7
Liberal Democrats	Ann Holtom	5,742	16.2	+0.3
BNP	Kevin McHugh	1,815	5.1	+0.4
UKIP	Maria Foy	842	2.4	0.0
Independent	Tony Tomkins	240	0.7	N/A
National Front	Terry Williams	229	0.6	−0.5
Christian	Timothy Gray	217	0.6	N/A
Majority		3,277	9.2	−21.0
Turnout		35,546	53.5	+5.1
Labour hold		Swing	−10.4	

=== Elections in the 2000s ===
General election 2005: Birmingham Erdington
Party	Candidate	Votes	%	±%
Labour	Siôn Simon	16,810	53.0	−3.8
Conservative	Victoria Elvidge	7,235	22.8	−1.4
Liberal Democrats	Jerry Evans	5,027	15.8	+4.0
BNP	Sharon Ebanks	1,512	4.8	N/A
UKIP	Rannal Hepburn	746	2.3	+0.6
National Front	Terry Williams	416	1.3	−0.9
Majority		9,575	30.2	−2.4
Turnout		31,746	48.9	+2.3
Labour hold		Swing	−1.2	

General election 2001: Birmingham Erdington
Party	Candidate	Votes	%	±%
Labour	Siôn Simon	17,375	56.8	−2.0
Conservative	Oliver Lodge	7,413	24.2	−3.3
Liberal Democrats	Sandra Johnson	3,602	11.8	+1.6
National Front	Michael Shore	681	2.2	N/A
Socialist Alliance	Steven Goddard	669	2.2	N/A
UKIP	Mark Nattrass	521	1.7	N/A
Socialist Labour	Judith Sambrook-Marshall	343	1.1	N/A
Majority		9,962	32.6	+1.3
Turnout		30,604	46.6	−14.2
Labour hold		Swing		

=== Elections in the 1990s ===
General election 1997: Birmingham Erdington
Party	Candidate	Votes	%	±%
Labour	Robin Corbett	23,764	58.8	+8.4
Conservative	Anthony Tomkins	11,107	27.5	−10.0
Liberal Democrats	Ian Garrett	4,112	10.2	−1.8
Referendum	Geoff Cable	1,424	3.5	N/A
Majority		12,657	31.3	+18.4
Turnout		40,407	60.8	+1.6
Labour hold		Swing	+9.2	

General election 1992: Birmingham Erdington
Party	Candidate	Votes	%	±%
Labour	Robin Corbett	18,549	50.5	+4.6
Conservative	Stanley Hope	13,814	37.6	−1.6
Liberal Democrats	John Campbell	4,398	12.0	−2.9
Majority		4,735	12.9	+6.3
Turnout		36,761	70.1	+1.6
Labour hold		Swing	+3.1	

=== Elections in the 1980s ===
General election 1987: Birmingham Erdington
Party	Candidate	Votes	%	±%
Labour	Robin Corbett	17,037	45.9	+6.1
Conservative	Paul Johnston	14,570	39.2	0.0
SDP	Neil Biddlestone	5,530	14.9	−6.2
Majority		2,467	6.6	+6.0
Turnout		37,137	68.5	+1.5
Labour hold		Swing	+3.1	

General election 1983: Birmingham Erdington
Party	Candidate	Votes	%	±%
Labour	Robin Corbett	14,930	39.8	−6.2
Conservative	Daniel Moylan	14,699	39.2	−5.3
SDP	Christopher Barber	7,915	21.1	N/A
Majority		231	0.6	−0.9
Turnout		37,554	67.0	+1.6
Labour hold		Swing		

=== Elections in the 1970s ===
General election 1979: Birmingham Erdington
Party	Candidate	Votes	%	±%
Labour	Julius Silverman	20,105	46.0	−5.5
Conservative	John Alden	19,425	44.5	+13.4
Liberal	Hugh Duffy	3,487	8.0	−6.2
National Front	Frank Hastilow	687	1.6	−1.7
Majority		680	1.5	−18.9
Turnout		43,704	67.9	+2.4
Labour hold		Swing	−9.5	

General election October 1974: Birmingham Erdington
Party	Candidate	Votes	%	±%
Labour	Julius Silverman	22,160	51.5	+2.8
Conservative	John Alden	13,383	31.1	−2.9
Liberal	Julia Mills	6,119	14.2	−0.6
National Front	Thomas Finnegan	1,413	3.3	+0.9
Majority		8,777	20.4	+5.7
Turnout		43,075	65.5	−6.8
Labour hold		Swing	+2.9	

General election February 1974: Birmingham Erdington
Party	Candidate	Votes	%	±%
Labour	Julius Silverman	22,978	48.7	−4.4
Conservative	C. Harvey	16,050	34.0	−12.9
Liberal	Patrick Humphrey	6,991	14.8	N/A
National Front	Thomas Finnegan	1,145	2.4	N/A
Majority		6,928	14.7	
Turnout		47,164	72.3	
Labour win (new seat)				

=== Elections in the 1950s ===
General election 1951: Birmingham Erdington
Party	Candidate	Votes	%	±%
Labour	Julius Silverman	29,561	53.1	+1.3
Conservative	Derek Broome	26,153	46.9	+4.7
Majority		3,408	6.2	−3.4
Turnout		55,714	82.6	−0.8
Labour hold		Swing	−1.7	

General election 1950: Birmingham Erdington
Party	Candidate	Votes	%	±%
Labour	Julius Silverman	29,252	51.77	−9.0
Conservative	John Wright	23,842	42.2	+3.0
Liberal	Sydney Fitzgerald	3,408	6.0	N/A
Majority		5,410	9.57	−15.5
Turnout		56,502	83.4	+14.4
Labour hold		Swing	−6.0	

=== Elections in the 1940s ===
General election 1945: Birmingham Erdington
Party	Candidate	Votes	%	±%
Labour	Julius Silverman	34,786	60.8	+23.4
Conservative	John Wright	22,457	39.2	−19.1
Majority		12,329	21.6	
Turnout		57,243	69.0	+3.5
Labour gain from Conservative		Swing	+31.3	

=== Elections in the 1930s ===
1936 Birmingham Erdington by-election
Party	Candidate	Votes	%	±%
Conservative	John Wright	27,068	56.5	−1.8
Labour	Charles Simmons	20,834	43.5	+6.1
Majority		6,234	13.0	−7.9
Turnout		47,902		
Conservative hold		Swing		

General election 1935: Birmingham Erdington
Party	Candidate	Votes	%	±%
Conservative	John Eales	27,716	58.3	−2.8
Labour	Charles Simmons	17,757	37.4	+5.5
National Dividend (Note: Supported by the Social Credit secretariat.)	HC Bell	2,050	4.3	N/A
Majority		9,959	20.9	−15.3
Turnout		47,523	65.5	−1.1
Conservative hold		Swing	−4.2	

General election 1931: Birmingham Erdington
Party	Candidate	Votes	%	±%
Conservative	John Eales	35,672	68.1	+25.0
Labour	Charles Simmons	16,676	31.9	−11.6
Majority		18,996	36.2	
Turnout		52,439	77.6	−1.1
Conservative gain from Labour		Swing		

=== Elections in the 1920s ===
General election 1929: Birmingham Erdington
Party	Candidate	Votes	%	±%
Labour	Charles Simmons	20,665	43.5	+3.0
Unionist	Arthur Steel-Maitland	20,532	43.1	−16.4
Liberal	Henry Dyer	6,395	13.4	N/A
Majority		133	0.4	N/A
Turnout		47,592	78.7	+6.2
Registered electors		60,472		
Labour gain from Unionist		Swing	+9.7	

General election 1924: Birmingham Erdington
Party	Candidate	Votes	%	±%
Unionist	Arthur Steel-Maitland	16,754	59.5	−6.5
Labour	Charles Simmons	11,412	40.5	+6.5
Majority		5,342	19.0	−13.0
Turnout		28,166	72.5	+13.1
Registered electors		38,864		
Unionist hold		Swing	−6.5	

General election 1923: Birmingham Erdington
Party	Candidate	Votes	%	±%
Unionist	Arthur Steel-Maitland	14,683	66.0	N/A
Labour	Albert Eyton	7,574	34.0	N/A
Majority		7,109	32.0	N/A
Turnout		22,257	59.4	N/A
Registered electors		37,450		
Unionist hold		Swing	N/A	

General election 1922: Birmingham Erdington
Party	Candidate	Votes	%	±%
Unionist	Arthur Steel-Maitland	Unopposed		
Unionist hold				

=== Election in the 1910s ===
General election 1918: Birmingham Erdington
Party		Candidate	Votes	%	±%
C	Unionist	Arthur Steel-Maitland	12,678	66.0	
	Independent Labour	Albert Edward Eyton	5,211	27.1	
	Liberal	Raglan Somerset	1,329	6.9	
Majority			7,467	38.9	
Turnout			19,218	56.1	
Registered electors			34,239		
	Unionist win (new seat)				
C indicates candidate endorsed by the coalition government.

== See also ==
- List of parliamentary constituencies in the West Midlands (county)
- List of parliamentary constituencies in West Midlands (region)
