= Julius Silverman =

British politician (1905–1996)

Member of Parliament for Birmingham Erdington Birmingham Aston (1955–1974)
- In office 26 July 1945 – 9 June 1983
- Preceded by: John Cecil-Wright
- Succeeded by: Robin Corbett

Personal details
- Born: 8 December 1905 Leeds, West Riding of Yorkshire, UK
- Died: 21 September 1996 (aged 90) Birmingham, West Midlands, UK
- Party: Labour
- Education: Leeds Central High School
- Occupation: barrister

Julius Silverman (8 December 1905 – 21 September 1996) was a British Labour Party politician.

== Early life and career ==
Silverman, whose father escaped anti-Jewish pogroms in Minsk, Russian Empire, was born in Leeds. He attended Leeds Central High School and first worked as a warehouseman. He later became a barrister, called by Gray's Inn in 1931, and practised in Birmingham. He served as a councillor on Birmingham City Council 1934–45.

== Political career ==
Silverman contested Birmingham Moseley in 1935. He was a Member of Parliament (MP) for 38 years, for Birmingham Erdington (1945–1955 and 1974–1983) and Birmingham Aston (1955–1974).

== Personal life ==
He was granted Honorary Freedom of the City of Birmingham in 1982 and died in Birmingham aged 90.

Parliament of the United Kingdom
Preceded by John Wright	Member of Parliament for Birmingham Erdington; 1945–1955	Constituency abolished
Preceded by Woodrow Wyatt	Member of Parliament for Birmingham Aston; 1955–February 1974	Constituency abolished
New constituency	Member of Parliament for Birmingham Erdington; February 1974–1983	Succeeded by Robin Corbett
