= Mary Turner (trade unionist) =

Irish trade union and political activist (1938–2017)

Mary Josephine Turner CBE (15 June 1938 – 19 July 2017) was an Irish trade union and political activist.

== Early life ==
Turner was born in County Tipperary and studied in Thurles. When she was twelve, her family moved to northern England, and then the Kilburn area of London. She started work when she was sixteen, at Jackson's Tailors on Oxford Street, also joining the National Union of Tailors and Garment Workers. She married and took time out of work to bring up her children, returning to employment as a dinner lady in Brent in 1970. She recruited many of her colleagues into the General and Municipal Workers' Union, hoping to improve their pay and conditions. She also began campaigning for free school meals for all pupils.

== Political affiliations ==
Turner was active in the Labour Party, and engaged in a wide variety of political activism from the 1970s onwards, including opposition to the National Front and organising catering for the People's March for Jobs. In 1989, when some party members in Brent East tried to deselect Ken Livingstone, Turner was one of two candidates to stand against him, although ultimately Livingstone was comfortably reselected. She was a candidate for the Labour nomination for the seat again in 2000, after Livingstone was expelled from the party, but on that occasion lost out to Paul Daisley.

She was elected to the National Executive Committee of the party in 1996, and was the Chair of the Labour Party in 2004.

Turner was elected to the executive of the union, which became the GMB, in 1983; initially, she was the only woman on the executive. In 1997, she was elected as the union's president, and was re-elected every year thereafter. During the 2010s, she suffered from increasingly poor health, but she remained active in the union until her death in 2017.

Turner was made a Member of the Order of the British Empire in 2010, and a Commander of the Order of the British Empire in the 2016 Birthday Honours.

Trade union offices
Preceded by Dick Pickering	President of the GMB; 1997–2017	Succeeded by Barbara Plant
Party political offices
Preceded by Diana Holland	Chair of the Labour Party; 2003–2004	Succeeded by Ian McCartney
