= Paulette Hamilton =

British politician (born 1962 or 1963)

Paulette Hamilton MP
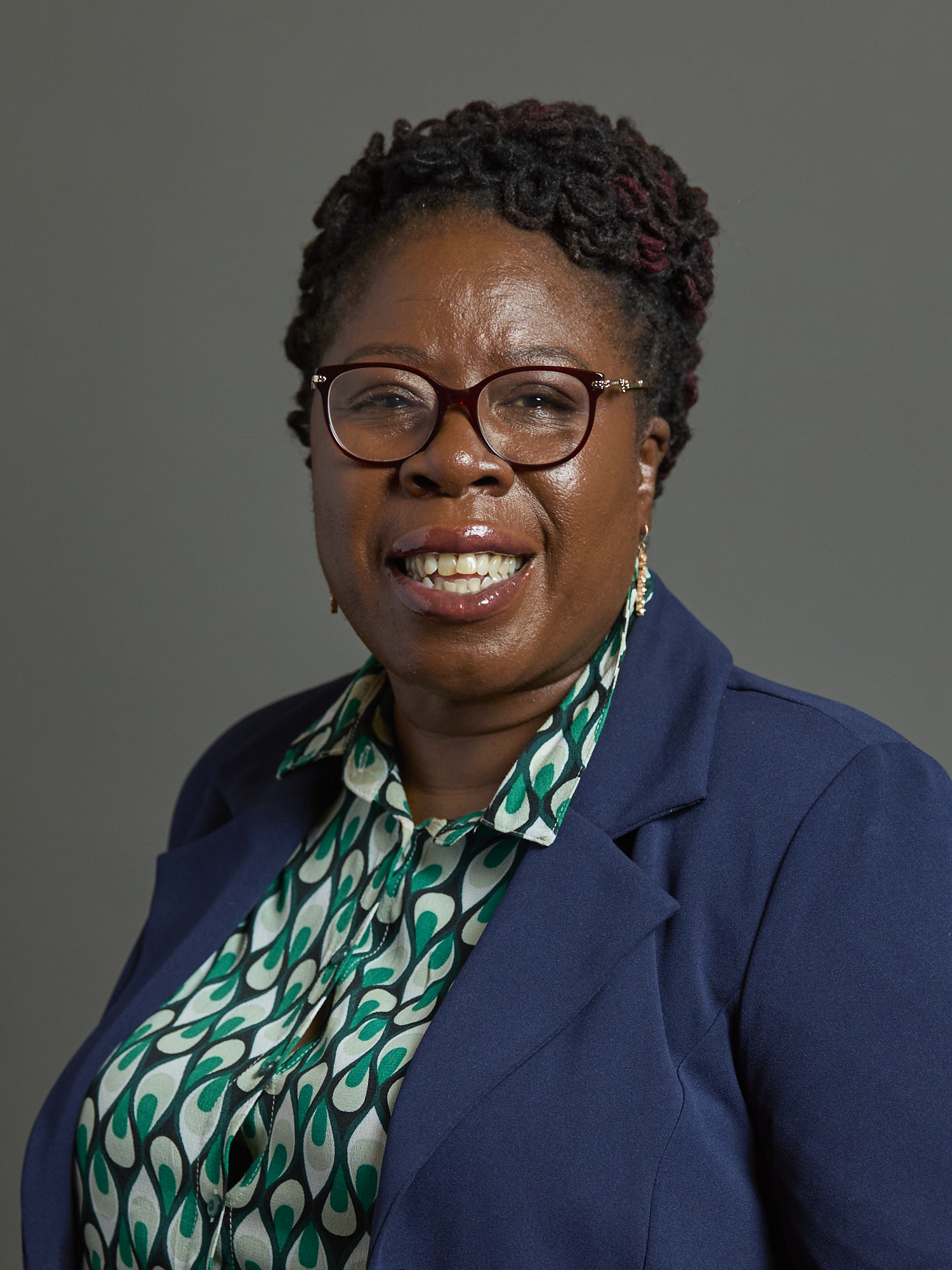
- Official portrait, 2024

Interim Chair of the Health and Social Care Select Committee
- In office 30 April 2025 – 13 October 2025
- Preceded by: Layla Moran
- Succeeded by: Layla Moran

Member of Parliament for Birmingham Erdington
- Incumbent
- Assumed office 3 March 2022
- Preceded by: Jack Dromey
- Majority: 7,019 (20.8%)

Member of Birmingham City Council
- In office 10 June 2004 – 5 May 2022
- Ward: Handsworth Wood (2004–2018); Holyhead (2018–2022)
- Preceded by: Ward established
- Succeeded by: Rinkal Shergill

Personal details
- Born: Paulette Adassa Hamilton; 1962 or 1963 (age 63–64) Handsworth, Birmingham, England
- Party: Labour

Paulette Adassa Hamilton (born 1962 or 1963) is a British Labour politician who has served as the Member of Parliament (MP) for Birmingham Erdington since 2022. She is the first Black MP to represent a constituency in Birmingham. She has been the Interim Chair of the Health and Social Care Select Committee since 2025.

Hamilton was a councillor on the Birmingham City Council between 2004 and 2022, representing the Handsworth Wood and Holyhead wards.

== Early life and career ==
Paulette Hamilton was born and grew up in Handsworth, West Midlands. Her parents emigrated to England from Jamaica in the 1960s as economic migrants and worked in factories. She has six siblings, and attended Wilkes Green Infant and Junior School (now William Murdoch Primary School). Hamilton reports that she experienced discrimination at her primary school, including teachers commenting that children like her were only destined "to have babies", as well as questioning whether she could read. She later attended King Edward VI Handsworth Wood Girls' Academy, where she was inspired by her mathematics teacher, Mr Potter, who supported her in gaining seven O Levels.

Hamilton worked as a nurse in the NHS for 25 years, including as a district nurse, sister, and later as a regional development officer for the trade union Royal College of Nursing.

Hamilton was elected as a councillor on Birmingham City Council, representing Handsworth Wood between 2004 and 2018, and Holyhead between 2018 and 2022. She served as Cabinet Member for Health and Social Care on the council from 2015 to 2022.

== Parliamentary career ==
She was selected as the Labour candidate for the 2022 Birmingham Erdington by-election on 26 January 2022. The by-election was called after the death of Labour MP Jack Dromey, who had represented the constituency since the 2010 general election.

The day before the by-election, GB News published footage from a 2015 panel discussion about increasing political representation of ethnic minorities called "The Ballot or the Bullet – Does your vote count?", which Hamilton attended. This event was named after the speech of the same name by American human rights activist Malcolm X. In the footage, Hamilton commented "I'm not sure we will get what we really deserve in this country using the vote". In response to the footage, two Conservative MPs called for her suspension. The Labour Party responded that "her comments had been misrepresented and taken out of context...". Hamilton reported that she had received "horrendous" online abuse due to the publication of the footage.

At the 2022 by-election, Hamilton was elected as MP for Birmingham Erdington with 55.5% of the vote and a majority of 3,266. She was Birmingham's first black MP.

Hamilton has been a member of the Health and Social Care Select Committee since July 2022.

In 2023 she called for licence fee payers to be consulted over proposed cuts to local BBC radio.

At the 2024 general election, Hamilton was re-elected to Parliament as MP for Birmingham Erdington with a decreased vote share of 43.7% and an increased majority of 7,019.

Since 2024, Hamilton has served as the Vice Chair of the Health and Social Care Select Committee.

== Personal life ==
Hamilton is married to a milliner, Dennis, who runs a shop in Grand Central, Birmingham. They have five children, one step-child and seven grandchildren.

Parliament of the United Kingdom
Preceded by Jack Dromey	Member of Parliament for Birmingham Erdington; 2022–present	Incumbent
