= John Cecil-Wright =

British politician

Air Commodore John Allan Cecil Cecil-Wright AFC TD AE (28 August 1886 – 14 July 1982), born John Allan Cecil Wright, was a British Royal Air Force officer and Conservative Party politician.

== Early life and military service ==
Born in Knowle, Warwickshire, he was educated at Winchester School.

In 1905 he was granted a commission in the 1st Volunteer Battalion, Royal Warwickshire Regiment. Three years later, when the Territorial Force was created, he helped form a company of the Army Service Corps. Following the outbreak of war, he accompanied his unit to France in 1915. In 1916 he transferred to the Royal Flying Corps in 1916. He rose to become squadron leader of 605 (County of Warwick) Bomber Squadron, Royal Auxiliary Air Force, from 1926 to 1936.

He was awarded the Air Force Cross (AFC) in the 1931 New Year Honours.

== Industry and local government in Birmingham ==
Cecil Wright was an industrialist, and became chairman of Warne, Wright & Rowlands Limited, screw, nut and bolt manufacturers. In 1934, he was elected to Birmingham City Council, where he was an advocate for the establishment of a municipal airport.

== Member of Parliament ==
In August 1936, John Frederick Eales, the Conservative Member of Parliament (MP) for the Birmingham constituency of Erdington died. On 18 August, the executive committee of Erdington Division Unionist Association unanimously chose Cecil Wright as their candidate to contest the resulting by-election. The other main candidate was C J Simmons of the Labour Party, who had held the seat from 1929 – 1931. The election was held on 20 October, and Cecil Wright was elected with a majority of 6,234 votes over Simmons. With the outbreak of the Second World War in 1939, elections were postponed, and Wright held the seat until the general election in 1945, when he was defeated by his Labour opponent, Julius Silverman. From 1941 to 1945, he was Commandant of Midland Command Air Training Corps.

== Later life ==
Cecil Wright and his second wife, Lilian, had an interest in the breeding and showing of dogs. He was an early enthusiast of the German Shepherd, and was one of the founding members of the Alsatian League and Club of Great Britain in 1924. After leaving parliament, he became chairman of the Kennel Club of Great Britain from 1948 to 1973, and its president from 1976 until his death. He was president of Crufts Dog Show from 1962 to 1976. He was also served as president of the Welsh Kennel Club and the Scottish Kennel Club. He was a supporter of the Birmingham Dog Show Society, and was instrumental in having it raised to championship status.

In 1957, Cecil Wright altered his surname to Cecil-Wright by deed poll, He returned to local politics as a member of Warwickshire County Council from 1958 to 1961. although he had always used the unhyphenated version as a surname.

Cecil-Wright died in Milford-on-Sea in 1982 aged 95.

Parliament of the United Kingdom
Preceded by John Frederick Eales	Member of Parliament for Birmingham Erdington; 1936–1945	Succeeded by Julius Silverman
