= Treasurer of the Labour Party =

Position in the British Labour Party

- Incumbent; Mike Payne
- Labour Party
- Member of: National Executive Committee
- Appointer: Labour Party Conference
- Inaugural holder: Arthur Henderson

The treasurer of the Labour Party is a position on the National Executive Committee of the British Labour Party.

Although a post with little power, in the past, it was often hotly contested by people who later became big names in British politics: Arthur Greenwood beat Herbert Morrison in 1943, Hugh Gaitskell beat Aneurin Bevan in 1954, who in turn beat George Brown in 1956, while James Callaghan beat Michael Foot in 1967. Since the 1990s, the post has typically been held by a senior member of one of the larger Trade Unions.

Since the Political Parties, Elections and Referendums Act 2000 (PPERA) came into force, the Labour Party has had to register a treasurer to the Electoral Commission, who becomes legally responsible for various returns to the Electoral Commission. It has been the practice of the NEC to register the full-time General Secretary as treasurer under PPERA, rather than the elected volunteer treasurer. This has created two treasurer roles within the party, so to disambiguate these roles the elected treasurer is often called Party Treasurer, and the PPERA treasurer is often called Registered Treasurer. The party accounts are signed by both treasurers using these titles, though under PPERA only the General Secretary need sign them.

In 2008 the post was contested by the incumbent Jack Dromey and by human rights lawyer Mark McDonald, with Dromey being re-elected. In 2010, former deputy prime minister John Prescott was defeated by Diana Holland.

== List of treasurers (1903–present) ==
Note: the right-hand column does not allocate height proportional to time in office.

A list of Treasurers since 1903.

Profile		Term began	Term ended	Leader(s)
1	Arthur Henderson (1863–1935) (1st time)	1903	1912	None
1	Arthur Henderson (1863–1935) (1st time)	1903	1912	Hardie
1	Arthur Henderson (1863–1935) (1st time)	1903	1912	Himself
1	Arthur Henderson (1863–1935) (1st time)	1903	1912	Barnes
1	Arthur Henderson (1863–1935) (1st time)	1903	1912	MacDonald (himself)
2	Ramsay MacDonald (1866–1937)	1912	1929	MacDonald (himself)
2	Ramsay MacDonald (1866–1937)	1912	1929	Henderson
2	Ramsay MacDonald (1866–1937)	1912	1929	Adamson
2	Ramsay MacDonald (1866–1937)	1912	1929	Clynes
2	Ramsay MacDonald (1866–1937)	1912	1929	MacDonald (himself)
(1)	Arthur Henderson (1863–1935) (2nd time)	1929	1936	MacDonald (himself)
(1)	Arthur Henderson (1863–1935) (2nd time)	1929	1936	Himself
(1)	Arthur Henderson (1863–1935) (2nd time)	1929	1936	Lansbury
(1)	Arthur Henderson (1863–1935) (2nd time)	1929	1936	Attlee
3	George Lathan	1936	1943 (died in office)	Attlee
4	Arthur Greenwood	1943	1954	Attlee
5	Hugh Gaitskell	1954	1956	Attlee
5	Hugh Gaitskell	1954	1956	Morrison (acting)
5	Hugh Gaitskell	1954	1956	Gaitskell
6	Aneurin Bevan	1956	1960	Gaitskell
7	Harry Nicholas	1960	1965	Gaitskell
7	Harry Nicholas	1960	1965	Brown (acting)
7	Harry Nicholas	1960	1965	Wilson
8	Dai Davies	1965	1967	Wilson
9	James Callaghan	1967	1976	Wilson
10	Norman Atkinson	1976	1981	Callaghan
10	Norman Atkinson	1976	1981	Foot
11	Eric Varley	1981	1983	Foot
12	Albert Booth	1983	1984	Kinnock
13	Sam McCluskie	1984	1992	Kinnock
14	Tom Burlison	1992	1996	Smith
14	Tom Burlison	1992	1996	Beckett (acting)
14	Tom Burlison	1992	1996	Blair
15	Margaret Prosser	1996	2001	Blair
16	Jimmy Elsby	2001	2004	Blair
17	Jack Dromey	2004	2010	Blair
17	Jack Dromey	2004	2010	Brown
17	Jack Dromey	2004	2010	Harman (acting: 1st time)
18	Diana Holland	2010	2022	Harman (acting: 1st time)
18	Diana Holland	2010	2022	Miliband
18	Diana Holland	2010	2022	Harman (acting: 2nd time)
18	Diana Holland	2010	2022	Corbyn
18	Diana Holland	2010	2022	Starmer
19	Mike Payne	2022	Incumbent	Starmer
19	Mike Payne	2022	Incumbent	Burnham
