= Diana Holland =

British trade unionist

Diana Holland OBE is a British trade unionist who is the former Assistant General Secretary of Unite having retired in 2023 and was the Treasurer of the Labour Party.

Holland was awarded the OBE in the 2001 New Year Honours, for "services to Equal Opportunities in Employment".

== Trade union career ==
In 2006, Holland served as Chair of the International Transport Workers' Federation women's committee, and was also national organiser for women, race and equalities for the Transport and General Workers' Union (TGWU). The TGWU subsequently merged into Unite, and Holland became its Assistant General Secretary, in which post she took a leading role in negotiations around the 2012 fuel tanker drivers' dispute.

She has also served as President of the Confederation of Shipbuilding and Engineering Unions.

== Labour Party ==
As of July 2010, Holland has been a Labour Party member for over 25 years with 16 years on the National Executive Committee, the longest continuously elected NEC member. She is a member of Islington North CLP.

Holland was elected as Labour Party Treasurer in September 2010, defeating John Prescott. Holland won 68.96% of the total vote, with 19.02% out of 50% in the individual members section of the electoral college and 49.93% out of 50% in the trade union affiliates section.

== Personal life ==
She is married to Joe Irvin, former Political Secretary (head of the No 10 Political Office) to Prime Minister Gordon Brown.

Party political offices
| Preceded by Margaret Wall | Chair of the National Executive Committee of the Labour Party; 2002–2003 | Succeeded by Mary Turner |
| Preceded by Jack Dromey | Treasurer of the Labour Party; 2010–present | Incumbent |
Trade union offices
| Preceded by John Rowse | President of the Confederation of Shipbuilding and Engineering Unions; 2003–2005 | Succeeded by Doug Collins |
