= 2022 Birmingham Erdington by-election =

UK parliamentary by-election

- 3 March 2022

Birmingham Erdington constituency
- Turnout: 27.0% (▼26.3 pp)
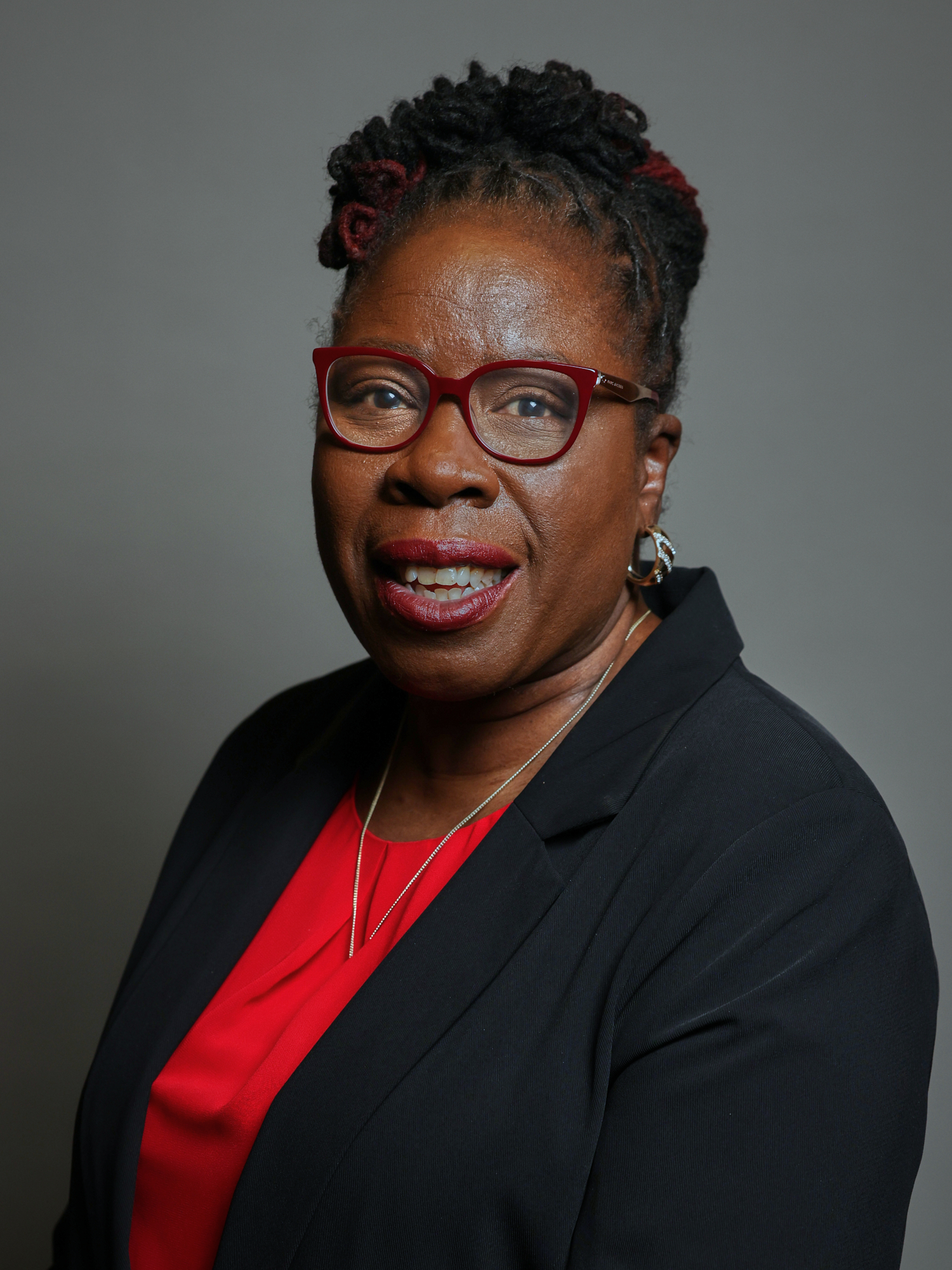
	First party	Second party
		Con
Candidate	Paulette Hamilton	Robert Alden
Party	Labour	Conservative
Last election	50.3%	40.1%
Popular vote	9,413	6,147
Percentage	55.5%	36.3%
Swing	▲5.2 pp	▼3.8 pp
MP before election
Jack Dromey
Labour
Elected MP
Paulette Hamilton
Labour

A by-election for the United Kingdom parliamentary constituency of Birmingham Erdington was held on 3 March 2022, following the death of incumbent Labour Party Member of Parliament (MP) Jack Dromey. It was won by Paulette Hamilton, who held the seat for Labour on an increased majority.

== Background and voter registration ==
Labour has held Birmingham Erdington since the seat was re-established in 1974. Dromey had been the MP for the constituency since 2010, being re-elected in 2015, 2017 and 2019. He died suddenly in his Birmingham flat on the morning of 7 January 2022, according to a family statement. He had spoken in a House of Commons afternoon debate on the UK resettlement scheme for Afghan refugees the day before.

The writ was issued on 31 January. The deadline to register to vote was 00:00 GMT on 15 February, with applications for postal votes due by 17:00 GMT on 16 February.

== Candidates ==
The Labour Party candidate was Paulette Hamilton, who was Birmingham City Council's cabinet member for Health and Social Care. She was selected in a virtual hustings against Ashley Bertie, the former West Midlands deputy police and crime commissioner, receiving 82 votes to Bertie's 32.

The Conservative Party selected Robert Alden, who had contested the seat in the previous four general elections.

Reform UK (formerly the Brexit Party) selected Birmingham postman Jack Brookes.

The Liberal Democrats selected Lee Dargue, who works in the rail sector, occupational health and safety and environmental management.

The Green Party selected local businesswoman Siobhan Harper-Nunes as its candidate.

Michael Lutwyche stood as an independent. Lutwyche is a Justice-4-the-21 campaigner, supporting the victims of the Birmingham pub bombings.

Dave Nellist stood for the Trade Unionist and Socialist Coalition (TUSC). He was the Labour MP for Coventry South East from 1983 to 1992. Nellist received support from the Breakthrough Party, the Northern Independence Party and Left Unity, who joined the TUSC on 20 January 2022 in the PAL - People's Alliance of the Left.

David Bishop was a satirical candidate. He said he was standing for serious policies, such as scrapping HS2 and saving public lavatories, as well as less serious ones, like legalising brothels with a 20% discount for pensioners. This would be the last by election contested by David Bishop before his death in December 2022.

== Campaign ==
Near the end of the campaign, remarks made by Paulette Hamilton in 2015 were uncovered by GB News where she suggested she was torn between a democratic vote and an uprising to enable black people to get what "we really deserve in this country". The comments led to calls from some Conservative MPs for her to be suspended by the Labour Party, who responded saying the remarks were taken out of context.

== Result ==
Bar chart of the election result.

2022 Birmingham Erdington by-election
Party	Candidate	Votes	%	±%
Labour	Paulette Hamilton	9,413	55.5	+5.2
Conservative	Robert Alden	6,147	36.3	–3.8
TUSC	Dave Nellist	360	2.1	N/A
Reform	Jack Brookes	293	1.7	–2.4
Green	Siobhan Harper-Nunes	236	1.4	–0.4
Liberal Democrats	Lee Dargue	173	1.0	–2.7
Independent	Michael Lutwyche	109	0.6	N/A
CPA	Mel Mbondiah	79	0.5	N/A
Independent	Thomas O'Rourke	76	0.4	N/A
Monster Raving Loony	The Good Knight Sir NosDa	49	0.3	N/A
Independent	Clifton Holmes	14	0.1	N/A
Church of the Militant Elvis	David Bishop	8	0.0	N/A
Majority		3,266	19.2	+9.0
Turnout		17,016	27.0	–26.3
Labour hold		Swing	+4.5	

== Previous result ==
General election 2019: Birmingham Erdington
Party	Candidate	Votes	%	±%
Labour	Jack Dromey	17,720	50.3	–7.7
Conservative	Robert Alden	14,119	40.1	+1.7
Brexit Party	Wendy Garcarz	1,441	4.1	N/A
Liberal Democrats	Ann Holtom	1,301	3.7	+1.7
Green	Rob Grant	648	1.8	+0.2
Majority		3,601	10.2	–9.4
Turnout		35,229	53.3	–3.9
Labour hold		Swing	–4.7	

== See also ==
- 2022 Birmingham City Council election
