= Derek Gladwin, Baron Gladwin of Clee =

The Right Honourable The Lord Gladwin of Clee CBE

Member of the House of Lords
- Lord Temporal
- Life peerage 28 September 1994 – 10 April 2003

Personal details
- Born: 6 June 1930
- Died: 10 April 2003 (aged 72)

Derek Oliver Gladwin, Baron Gladwin of Clee, CBE (6 June 1930 – 10 April 2003) was a British trade unionist.

Born in Grimsby, Gladwin was educated at Ruskin College and the London School of Economics.

Gladwin worked for the General and Municipal Workers' Union from 1956 to 1990, rising to the position of Regional Secretary (Southern Region). He was Chairman of the Conference Arrangements Committee of the Labour Party from 1974 to 1990, a position of considerable importance within the Labour Party.

Gladwin was appointed OBE in 1977 and CBE in 1979. On 28 September 1994, Gladwin was made a life peer, as Baron Gladwin of Clee, of Great Grimsby in the county of Humberside. In the House of Lords he served as a Labour whip.

Trade union offices
Preceded by Alex M. Donnet	Chair of the GMB; 1976?–1982	Succeeded by Dick Pickering
Party political offices
Preceded by Glyn Williams	Chair of the Labour Party Conference Arrangements Committee; 1974 – 1990	Succeeded by Frank Wilkinson
