= Jimmy Elsby =

British trade union leader

Jimmy Elsby is a British trade union leader. He was Treasurer of the Labour Party in Great Britain during 2001–04.

He was also an assistant general secretary of the Transport and General Workers' Union. He was a candidate for general secretary in 2003.
