= Charles Simmons (politician) =

British lecturer, journalist and politician

Charles James Simmons
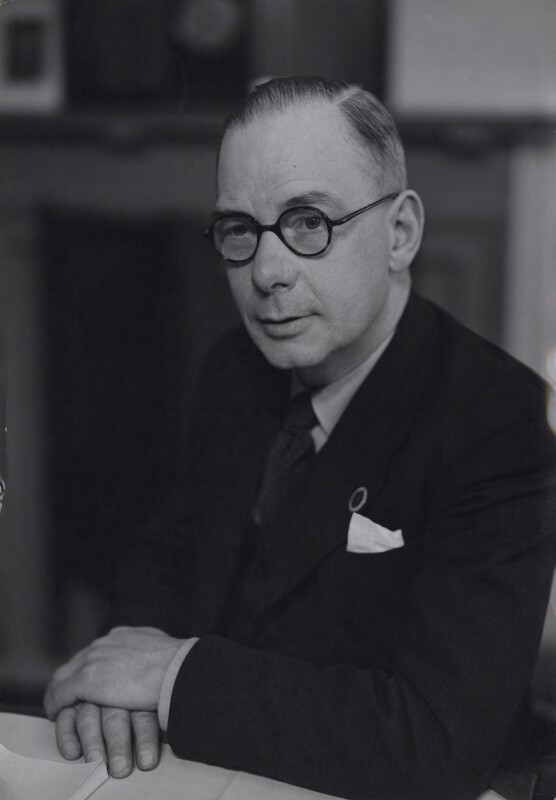
- Simmons in 1949

Member of Parliament for Brierley Hill
- In office 23 February 1950 – 18 September 1959
- Preceded by: Constituency established
- Succeeded by: John Ellis Talbot

Member of Parliament for Birmingham West
- In office 5 July 1945 – 3 February 1950
- Preceded by: Walter Higgs
- Succeeded by: Constituency abolished

Member of Parliament for Birmingham Erdington
- In office 30 May 1929 – 7 October 1931
- Preceded by: Arthur Steel-Maitland
- Succeeded by: John Eales

Personal details
- Born: 9 April 1893 Moseley, Birmingham, England
- Died: 11 August 1975 (aged 82)
- Party: Labour

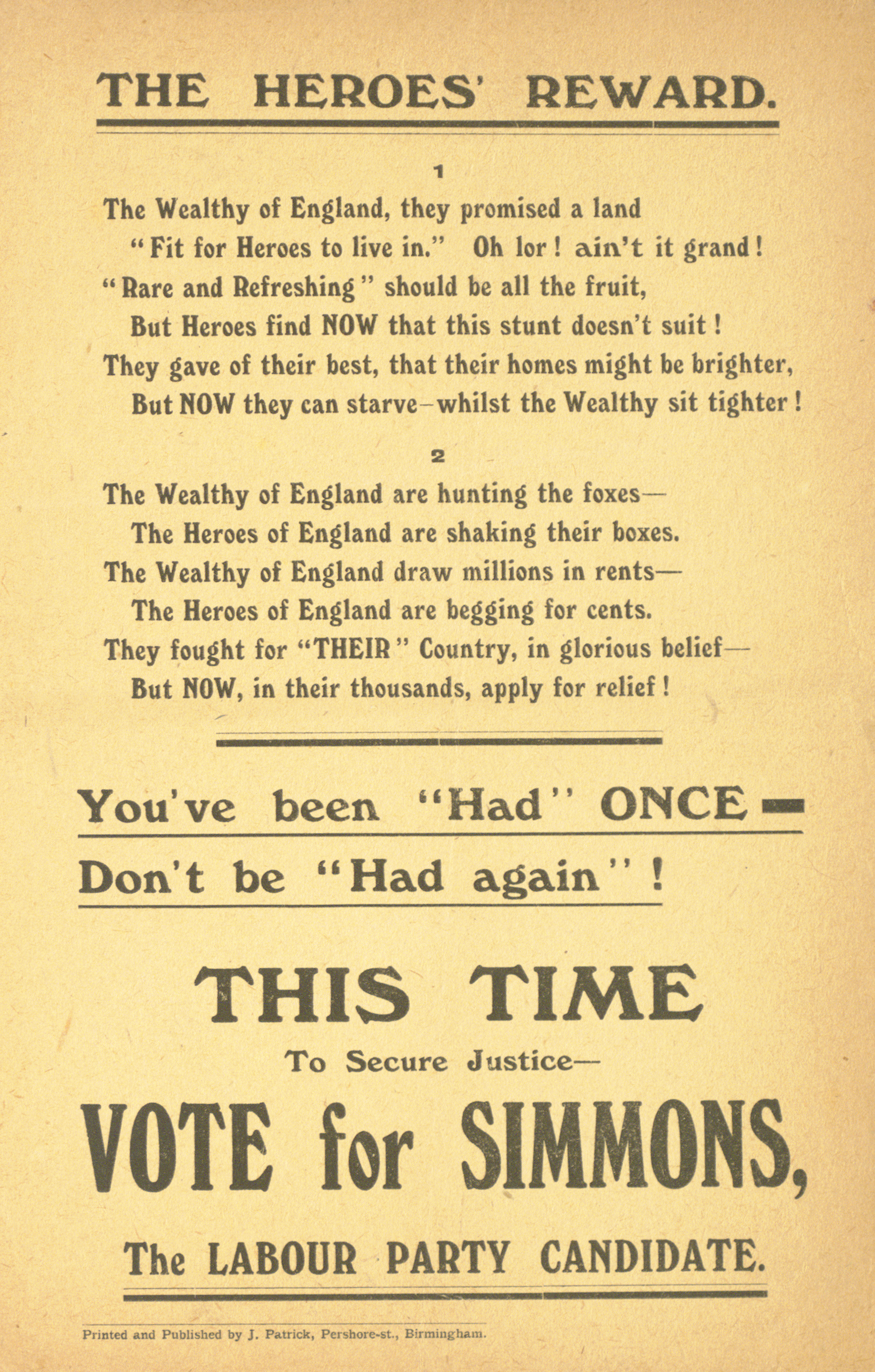
An election leaflet for Simmons, c. 1919

Charles James "Jim" Simmons (9 April 1893 – 11 August 1975) was a British lecturer, journalist and politician.

== Early life and Military Service ==
Simmons was born in Moseley, Birmingham. Following elementary education, he became a Primitive Methodist lay preacher at the age of 16. In World War I he served in the Worcestershire Regiment, seeing action in France, Egypt, and Gallipoli. He was twice imprisoned whilst in the army, once for protesting against field punishments and again for appearing in uniform at a peace rally. He was wounded three times, the last at Vimy in Spring 1916, as a result of which his lower leg was amputated. Discharged from the army in November 1917 he continued campaigning for peace but was arrested in February 1918 and sentenced to three months imprisonment in Armley Gaol.

After that war, Simmons became a leading member of the National Union of Ex-Servicemen (NUX), a socialist group which fought for the rights of those returning from the war. Following the demise of the NUX as a national body, Simmons remained active on these issues in local organisations and when later elected to Parliament lobbied persistently on behalf of the British Limbless Ex-Servicemen's Association (BLESMA). A Christian Socialist, he also played a leading role in the Labour Church movement.

He gained political office as a member of Birmingham City Council from 1921–1931 and 1942–1945.

== Member of parliament for Erdington ==
Simmons was selected as the Labour Party's candidate to contest Birmingham Erdington at the 1924 general election. He failed to unseat the sitting Conservative MP, Sir Arthur Steel-Maitland in a straight fight.

At the next general election in 1929, he was again Labour candidate at Erdington. As well as Steel-Maitland, a Liberal, H J H Dyer, was also nominated to contest the seat. Simmons defeated Steel-Maitland by the narrow margin of 133 votes, benefitting from the fact that Dyer received more than 6,300 votes. The election had been very bitter, with Simmons issuing a leaflet accusing Steel-Maitland of abusing his position as Minister for Labour and using a charitable fund to subsidise colliery owners to employ miners at less than the minimum wage. Following a threat by the defeated MP to begin libel proceedings, Simmons issued a formal apology.

Two years later another general election was called. Simmons defended his seat against a new Conservative opponent J F Eales. There was a large swing against Labour, and Eales defeated Simmons by the majority of nearly 19,000 votes.

At the next general election in 1935 Simmons attempted to regain the Erdington seat from Eales. This time it was a three-cornered contest, with an independent candidate also standing. He failed to be elected, increasingly his vote only marginally.

On the death of Eales, Simmons also unsuccessfully contested the 1936 by-election, which was to be the last contest until 1945, owing to the Second World War. Simmons found work as a political journalist, editing the Town Crier, the journal of the Birmingham Trades Council, from 1940–1945.

== Member of parliament for Birmingham West ==
Simmons was nominated as Labour candidate for Birmingham West at the 1945 general election, in opposition to the sitting Conservative MP Walter Higgs. There was a landslide to Labour, and he won the seat comfortably. He was a member of the Labour Government 1945-1951 as a Lord of the Treasury from 30 March 1946 to 1 February 1949, after which he served as Parliamentary Secretary to the Minister for Pensions.

== Member of parliament for Brierley Hill ==
Following boundary changes, Simmons became MP for the new Black Country constituency of Brierley Hill from the 1950 general election. He held the seat at the 1955 election, but was unexpectedly defeated by his Conservative opponent at the 1959 general election. Simmons was a strong advocate of the Temperance movement, and campaigned for fourteen-year-old children to be banned from the bars of clubs. His defeat in 1959 was believed to have been partly attributable to the opposition of brewery interests.

He published his autobiography Soap-Box Evangelist in 1972. He died in 1975 aged 82, survived by his four sons and second wife.

Parliament of the United Kingdom
Preceded by Arthur Steel-Maitland	Member of Parliament for Birmingham Erdington; 1929–1931	Succeeded by John Frederick Eales
Preceded by Walter Higgs	Member of Parliament for Birmingham West; 1945–1950	Constituency abolished
New constituency	Member of Parliament for Brierley Hill; 1950–1959	Succeeded by John Ellis Talbot
Party political offices
Preceded by Clement Bundock	Midlands Division representative on the National Administrative Council of the Independent Labour Party; 1922–1923	Succeeded by Clement Bundock
