= St Nicolas Park =

Area of Nuneaton, Warwickshire, England

Coordinates: 52.533°N 1.441°W

St Nicolas Park is a suburb of Nuneaton in Warwickshire, central England. It is a large housing estate, built between the 1960s and the 1990s. It is situated on the north-eastern edge of Nuneaton, close to the A5 (Watling Street) and approximately 1½ miles from the town centre.

== Administration ==
Home nation: England
Region: West Midlands
Administrative county: Warwickshire
Ceremonial county: Warwickshire
Historic county: Warwickshire
Local government district: Nuneaton & Bedworth borough
District ward(s): Milby, St Nicolas
County electoral division(s): Weddington
Postal district(s): CV11 (sector 6)
Boundaries: An imaginary line running to the north and east of Milby Drive, Pallett Drive, St Nicolas Park Drive and Buttermere Avenue (including all cul-de-sacs leading off to the north and east); The Long Shoot and Hinckley Road (A47); Glebe Lane and the grounds of North Warwickshire & South Leicestershire College (immediately south of Ambleside Way); and Higham Lane

== History ==
The estate is named after the ecclesiastical parish in which it is located, Nuneaton St Nicolas.

The main thoroughfares through the estate are:

- St Nicolas Park Drive (between Hinckley Road and Higham Lane), the estate's main road,
- Pallett Drive (between St Nicolas Park Drive and the northern end of Milby Drive),
- Milby Drive (between Higham Lane and the southern part of Pallett Drive ).

Windermere Avenue is also an important thoroughfare, and in fact was originally intended to be the main road through the estate.

The first part of the estate to be built was constructed in the 1960s, and is also known as the Glebe Estate, as it was built on land belonging to Glebe Farm (after which nearby Glebe Lane is named). It comprises those streets in the south of the estate, which are mainly named after lakes and places in the English Lake District (e.g. Kirkstone Walk, Ullswater Avenue, Coniston Way). Some streets also bear the name of local dignitaries (e.g. Knox Crescent, Raison Avenue).

The second part of the estate was built in the 1970s, based around Pallett Drive (named after the constructor that built the first part of the estate). The streets in this area are mainly named after places on the Thames (e.g. Woodcote Avenue, Reading Avenue, Chelsea Close). One street (Callendar Close) is named after a local farm, while Milby Drive takes its name from the town and parish church of Milby in George Eliot's Scenes of Clerical Life, which was based on Nuneaton (her home town) and St Nicolas parish church. Milby Drive was originally built in two (unconnected) parts (the first leading off Higham Lane, the second leading off the southern part of Pallett Drive).

The third and final part of the estate was developed in the 1990s and consisted of the central part of Milby Drive (connecting the two existing parts) and the adjoining cul-de-sacs, which, with the exception of Change Brook Close (named after a local tributary of the Anker), are named after English cathedral cities (e.g. Canterbury Way, Lichfield Close, Norwich Close).

== Education ==
St Nicolas Park is served by two primary schools: St Nicolas CE Primary School (which also serves the nearby Horeston Grange estate), on Windermere Avenue, and Milby Primary School, on Milby Drive.

At secondary level, St Nicolas Park is in the catchment area for nearby Higham Lane School.

Post-16 education is provided by King Edward VI College, in the centre of Nuneaton, and North Warwickshire and South Leicestershire College, adjacent to the estate.

== Community and leisure facilities ==
St Nicolas Park has a number of recreation grounds and play areas (the largest being the playing fields off Ambleside Way and off Buttermere Avenue). In addition, there are two sports clubs (Ambleside Sports Club and Nuneaton Bowling Club) located nearby.

There are two public houses on the estate: The Coniston Tavern, on Pallett Drive, and The Yeoman, a Harvester family restaurant (which, since the mid-1990s, has been attached to a Travelodge hotel) on the corner of St Nicolas Park Drive and Hinckley Road. Other nearby pubs include The Chase (on Higham Lane), The Acorn (on Camborne Drive in Horeston Grange), and The Longshoot Hotel.

There is one place of worship on the estate: Nuneaton Christian Fellowship on Pallett Drive. The Anglican parish church for the area is St Nicolas' church in Nuneaton town centre. The Horeston Grange Ecumenical Church is on nearby Camborne Drive.

== Shopping facilities ==
Local shops can be found around the junction of St Nicolas Park Drive and Coniston Way. The nearest post office is Higham Lane post office (on the corner of St Nicolas Park Drive and Higham Lane). Other shopping facilities can be found in nearby Horeston Grange and in Nuneaton town centre.
