= Horeston Grange =

Suburb of Nuneaton, Warwickshire, England

Coordinates: 52.527°N 1.440°W

Horeston Grange is a suburban area of Nuneaton, Warwickshire in England.

Formerly a monastic farming estate belonging to Nuneaton Priory, centred upon a moated manor house, it is now the site of a large housing estate, built mainly in the late 1980s and early 1990s (with an addition in the early 2000s). It is situated in eastern Nuneaton, approximately 1.5 miles from the town centre, not far from the border of Warwickshire with Leicestershire.

== History ==
=== Prehistory ===
The site has yielded discoveries of Palaeolithic (i.e. Old Stone Age) materials.

=== The monastic grange ===
The "Grange" of Horeston was so-called as being a managed monastic farming estate, which in medieval times (by 1291) was one of the manorial possessions of the Priory of Benedictine nuns at Nuneaton. In 1291 the Prioress of Eaton had, at the grange of Horeston in the Deanery of Arden, six carucates of land worth ten shillings a year, and had there profits of the store to the value of seven shillings a year. Dr. Berenice Kerr shows that it was one of the five larger manors, together with Eaton, Hodnell, Ratby and Wibtoft, engaged in production of wheat and other arable crops supplied to Nuneaton Priory in the late 1340s, and was managed by lay brothers together with their estate at Burton. That priory, one of the three English cells subordinate to the Abbey of Fontevrault in the County of Anjou, France, was originally founded at Kintbury in Berkshire, by Robert de Beaumont, 2nd Earl of Leicester and Gervase Paganell, c. 1153-55, but was removed to Nuneaton in c. 1155. King Henry II, of the House of Anjou, came to the throne of England in 1154 and was later buried at Fontevrault.

=== Dissolution and manorial estate ===
The grange at Horeston was among its endowments in September 1539 and was valued at £25.09s.08d. in the Valor Ecclesiasticus, shortly before the priory was dissolved under King Henry VIII; it formed part of the king's gift of the priory and its possessions to his servant Sir Marmaduke Constable (died 1560), son of Sir Robert Constable, in the spring of 1540. Constable sold the grange to Jasper Fisher, who bequeathed it to his heirs Katherine Norwood and Anne Wolrich, his cousins. However the lands called Horeston Fields and Horeston Wood remained in the hands of Robert Constable (heir of Sir Marmaduke), and in Queen Elizabeth's time were sold to Stephen Hales, Esq.

The manorial estate which, as part of the Lordship of Nuneaton, succeeded the monastic grange, preserved the name of "Grange" in its title, and became the site of a manor and moated manor house called Horeston Grange. In 1835 there were still some standing buildings surrounded by a moat containing water, with an entrance on the north side. The moat itself is likely to have been the surviving enclosure of the medieval grange buildings, so the later manor house may have occupied the same site and have contained medieval masonry. In 1947 it was noted that the site was crossed by the railway line to Leicester, and that the only trace of the manor house was a dry moat. A Report of 1994, however, refers to three moated enclosures. Nearby Oaston Road is named after the same manor of Horeston/Oaston. Prior to the construction of the housing estate, the only features in the area were manorial earthworks.

=== The railway ===
Horeston Grange took on some importance in around 1870, when it became desirable to develop the railway across this particular tract of land. The Midland Railway Company, in parliamentary notices, applied to make "an alteration and deviation of line and levels of the Whitacre and Nuneaton Railway, to be called 'The Horeston Grange Deviation', and to empower the company to abandon such parts of the line as shall become unnecessary"; and to make "a railway to be called 'The Horeston Grange Junction' at Nuneaton, between the South Leicestershire Railway and the Whitacre and Nuneaton Railway Junction, and to terminate on the Horeston Grange Deviation line." Trial excavations in the area around the medieval grange, made in 1994, show that quantities of ash dumped from steam engines overlie some of the more ancient earthworks.

== The modern estate ==
=== Construction ===
The current housing estate dates, for the most part, from the late 1980s and early 1990s. It was constructed in two sections; there is no vehicular access between the two, although there are a number of connecting pathways for pedestrians.

The northern section (off Hinckley Road, based around Tiverton Drive and Tavistock Way) comprises 12 streets named after places in Devon. The southern section (off Eastboro Way, based around the horseshoe formed by Camborne Drive) comprises 24 streets named after places in Cornwall. Two of these streets (Portreath Drive and St Buryan Close) were built in the early 2000s as the "Peppermill Green" development.

Works began to extend the area again during the 2010s. The new estate is across Eastboro Way from Camborne Drive.

=== Schools ===
The area is served by one primary school, St Nicolas CE Academy, on Windermere Avenue in nearby St Nicolas Park, and one can go to Milby Primary on Milby Drive, also in St Nicolas Park.

At secondary level, Horeston Grange is near to Higham Lane School, a Business And Enterprise College, and is in the catchment area for nearby Etone College. Post-16 education is currently provided by King Edward VI College (in Nuneaton town centre) and North Warwickshire and Hinckley College (just north of Horeston Grange).

=== Community and leisure facilities ===
Horeston Grange has 2 new play areas. The largest of these lies between Wadebridge Drive and Tiverton Drive.

The area has one public house: The Acorn on Camborne Drive, home to the infamous Corn Club crew. Nearby, there are number of other pubs, such as The Harvester (on the corner of St Nicolas Park Drive and Hinckley Road) and The Longshoot Hotel (at the junction of Watling Street and The Long Shoot).

There is one place of worship in the area: the Horeston Grange Church Centre, home to Horeston Grange Ecumenical Church on Camborne Drive.

=== Shopping facilities ===
Local shops can be found at Horeston Grange Shopping Centre at the northern junction of Camborne Drive and Eastboro Way. Additional shopping facilities can be found in nearby St Nicolas Park, as well as in Nuneaton town centre.
