= Attleborough, Warwickshire =

Area of Nuneaton, England

Coordinates: 52.51564°N 1.45748°W

Attleborough
- Location within Warwickshire
- Population: 7,564 (2001 census)
- OS grid reference: SP369909
- District: Nuneaton and Bedworth
- Shire county: Warwickshire
- Region: West Midlands
- Country: England
- Sovereign state: United Kingdom
- Post town: Nuneaton
- Postcode district: CV11
- Dialling code: 024
- Police: Warwickshire
- Fire: Warwickshire
- Ambulance: West Midlands
- UK Parliament: Nuneaton

Attleborough is an area of Nuneaton, Warwickshire. It is about a mile south-east of the town centre.

It is historically an ancient village that dates to before 1150. Owned by Robert de Beaumont, 1st Earl of Leicester and given by him to the Nuns of Chaise-Dieu. Confirmed by his son in 1168. It was sold by Chaise-Dieu in about 1293 to Nuneaton. On the 'Dissolution' the Manor passed to Sir Marmaduke Constable retaining its separate constitution. (For more history see Dugdale & ex.inf. The Rev. M Knight Nuneaton in Warwickshire in central England. It should not be confused with the larger town of Attleborough in Norfolk.

The centre of Attleborough has a village feel to it and contains a number of shops, restaurants, takeaways and pubs. The Holy Trinity Church of England was built in 1842, as a Chapel of Ease of Nuneaton St. Nicholas. Nonconformist Baptist church dates from 1821, Strict Baptist 1880 and Methodist Church in Hall End.

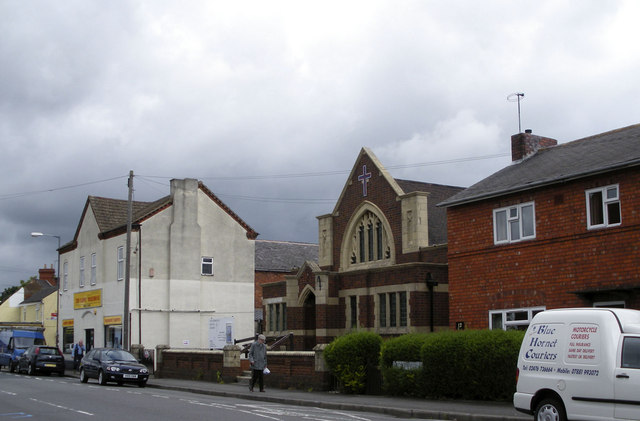
Attleborough Baptist Chapel

== History ==
A now-disappeared local stone quarry was the source of "Attleborough Sandstone" a very popular high-quality building stone that was once used in the construction of numerous up-market buildings, particularly churches, in the local area. A noted example is the parish church, St Margaret's, in Stoke Golding. The quarry operated from medieval times until the 1930s when the stone was worked-out. It was subsequently used as a rubbish tip and infilled. It is now covered by housing and a recreation ground. Quarry Lane provides a reminder of its existence.

=== Industry ===
Attleborough has a number of industrial estates: the largest of these is Attleborough Fields Industrial Estate, which, together with the adjacent Eastboro Fields/Hemdale development, is located in eastern Attleborough, immediately south of the Birmingham–Leicester railway line and the Horeston Grange housing estate. Other industrial estates in the area include Trident Business Park (on Holman Way, off Park Street) and the industrial estates off Caldwell Road (although, strictly speaking, these are in Chilvers Coton rather than Attleborough).

==== Sports ====
Nuneaton RFC (informally known as "The Nuns") and Nuneaton Town FC (formerly known as Nuneaton Borough and nicknamed "The Boro'") play their home matches at Liberty Way, just off the Attleborough Fields Industrial Estate. The stadium was rebuilt to accommodate Nuneaton Town FC for the 2007/08 season.

== Notable people ==
- William Gadsby (1773–1844), Baptist minister and hymn-writer born at Attleborough
