= Abbey Theatre (disambiguation) =

The Abbey Theatre is the Irish national theatre in Dublin.

Abbey Theatre may also refer to:

- Abbey Theatre, Nuneaton, England
- Abbey Theatre School associated with the Abbey Theatre, Dublin
- Abbey's Theatre, 1893–1896 name of the Knickerbocker Theatre (Broadway), 1396 Broadway (West 38th Street), New York City
- Abbey Theatre, former name of the Classic Stage Company Theatre, 136 East 13th Street, New York City

== See also ==
- Abbey's Park Theatre (1874–1882) 932 Broadway and 22nd Street, New York City
