= Wally Holmes =

Wally Holmes may refer to:

- Waldo Holmes (born 1928), American musician and songwriter known as Wally Holmes
- Wally Holmes (rugby union) (1925/26–2009), England international rugby union player
