= Stockingford =

Suburb of Nuneaton, Warwickshire, England

Coordinates: 52.5195°N 1.5092°W

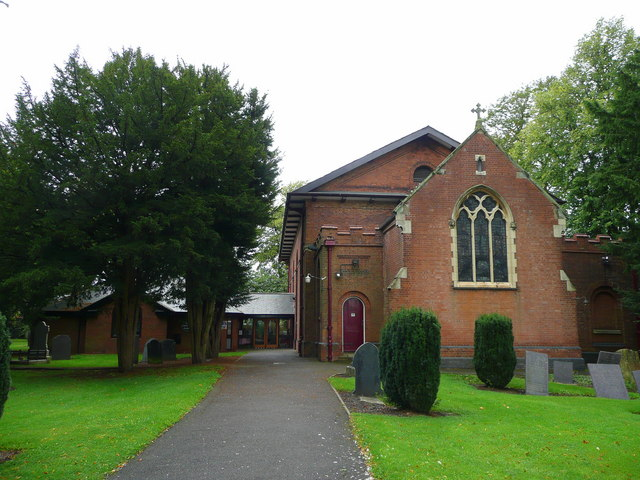
- St Paul's Church, Stockingford

- Location within Warwickshire
- District: Nuneaton and Bedworth
- Shire county: Warwickshire
- Region: West Midlands
- Country: England
- Sovereign state: United Kingdom

Stockingford is a suburb of the town of Nuneaton, in the county of Warwickshire, England, about 2 miles (3.2 km) west of Nuneaton town centre.

Stockingford first appeared in records in 1157, named Stoccingford, derived from the Old English Stocc; to root up trees. It therefore has its origin as a clearance in a wood, by a ford across a stream. It was historically a small hamlet within the old parish of Nuneaton. In the early 19th century the area became industrialised, with several collieries and brickworks, and the population expanded rapidly. In 1824, the church of St Paul's was built, originally as a chapel of ease to the main church in Nuneaton. Stockingford became a separate ecclesiastical parish in 1846, and St Paul's church became a parish church.

Stockingford was served by its own railway station on the Birmingham to Nuneaton line from 1864 until 1968. There have been proposals to reopen the station in recent years.

Stockingford was mentioned in George Eliot's novel Scenes of Clerical Life as 'Paddiford Common'.

The area is adjacent to Whittleford Park, a public park and nature reserve, reclaimed from former industrial land in the 2000s.
