= St Paul's Church, Stockingford =

Church in Nuneaton, Warwickshire, England

St Paul's, Stockingford
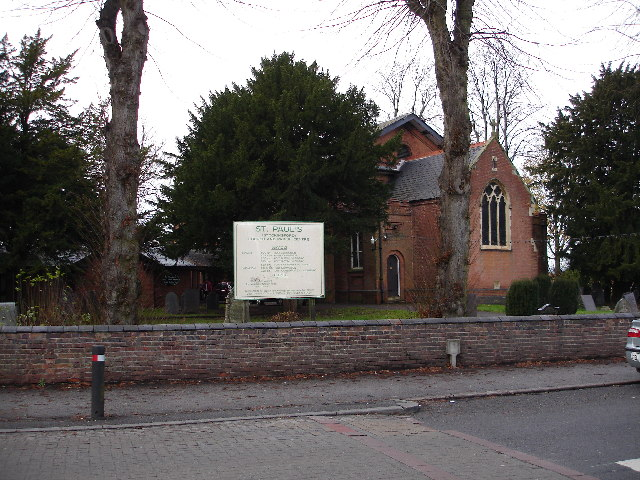
- St Paul's Church, seen from Church Road
- St Paul's, Stockingford
- 52.519404°N 1.509245°W
- OS grid reference: SP 33349 91403
- Country: England
- Denomination: Church of England
- Website: www.stpaulsstockingford.org.uk

History
- Dedication: St Paul

Administration
- Province: Canterbury
- Diocese: Coventry
- Parish: Stockingford

Clergy
- Vicar: The Revd Kate Massey

St Paul's Church, Stockingford, is a Church of England parish church in Stockingford, Nuneaton, Warwickshire, England. It is part of the Diocese of Coventry.

== Location ==
The church is on the west side of Church Road, near the junction with St Paul's Road. Its churchyard is about 1.3 acres (5,300 m^{2}).

== History ==
In about 1819 there were riots in Stockingford. Homeworkers in the local hosiery industry were told that their wages were to be reduced. They took to the streets in protest and the local militia were brought in to deal with the unrest. The Church of St Nicholas in Nuneaton decided that a chapel of ease should be built to quell the violent folk of Stockingford. In 1822 work began on the building, and in 1824 St Paul's Church in Stockingford was consecrated.

== Building ==
The church is recorded in the National Heritage List for England as a designated Grade II listed building. The original construction was begun in 1822, on designs by John Russell of Leamington Spa. The building has been added to several times since.

=== 1822 original building ===
The foundation stone was laid in 1822. The oldest part of the church consists of the nave and tower which were constructed in a neo-classical style. The roofs of the nave and tower are in slate and lead respectively. The walls are of dark red handmade brickwork, with large diamond-pattern coloured windows. The nave has a flat plaster ceiling, and originally had a suspended oak floor. The original building had an apsidal chancel which was nothing more than a semi-circular recess. At its opening, the church had 520 free seats and 88 other seats. The total cost of building was £2000.

The church was consecrated and dedicated on 22 April 1824 by the Hon. Henry Ryder, bishop of the then united Diocese of Lichfield and Coventry.

=== 1897 chancel ===
The chancel was added in 1897 by G.B. Vialls in a Gothic revival style, at a cost of £1200. The church then consisted of a chancel and nave with a west tower. There are vestries to the north and south sides of the chancel. The chancel has an open timber framed ceiling with plaster infill. The floor is of stone slabs with some wood block areas around the choir stalls. There is a decorative mosaic made from encaustic glass tiles on the altar platform. At some point since its installation, the mosaic was covered with carpet, and forgotten about until it was rediscovered in 2008.

At the same time as the construction of the chancel, the church was reordered and the seats in the nave were replaced with pews.

=== 1995 extension ===
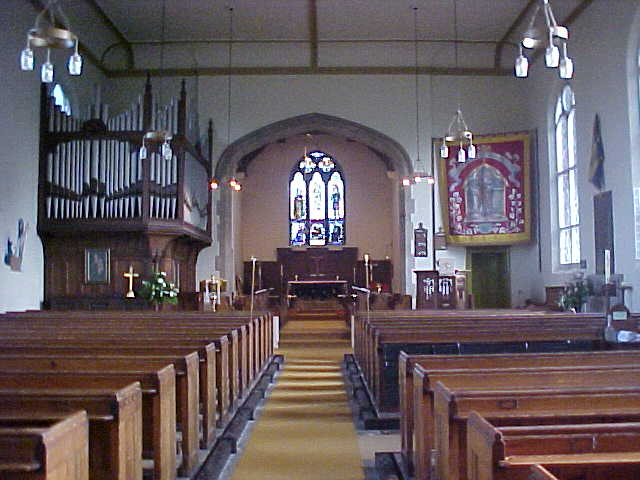
Church interior in 2002

In 1995, St. Paul's Church extended its church building with the addition of the Parish Centre. This extension was built at the south side of the Church, with funds raised by the people of Stockingford, supported by an EU grant. A new south porch was added to connect the church building to the Church Centre. Some pews were removed to provide access to the porch, which can be seen in the adjacent picture.

The centre was dedicated on 15 January 1995 by the then Bishop of Coventry, Simon Barrington-Ward and opened by the youngest and eldest members of the congregation, Thom Udall and Fred Ward.

=== 2008 re-ordering ===
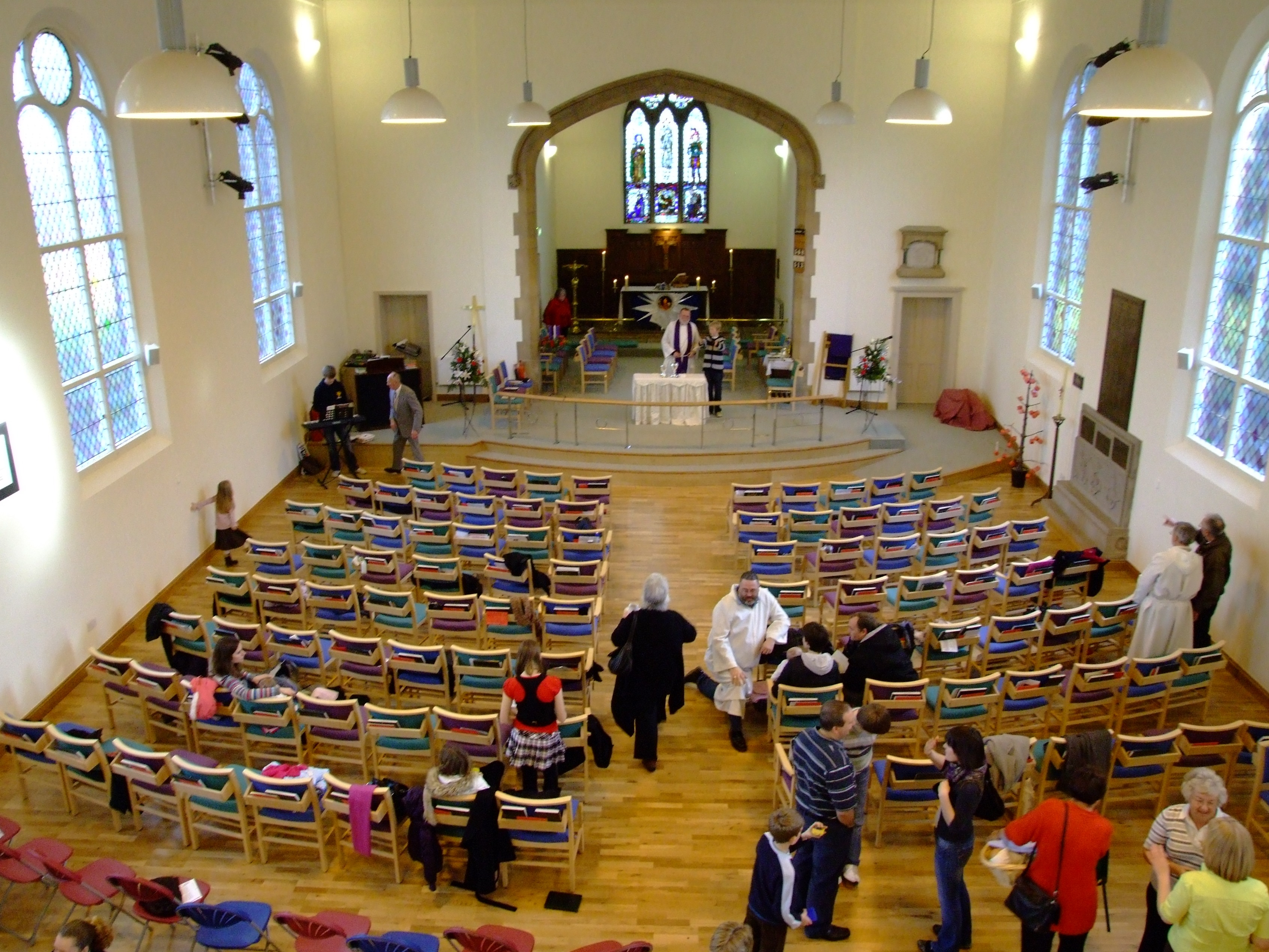
Church interior after 2008 re-ordering

Work on re-ordering the Church building began in September 2008, involving the removal of the pews, the restyling of the Church interior, and the creation of a Church Hall for use by local community groups.

The old pipe organ, installed in 1909 at a cost of £450, was labelled and dismantled, piece by piece, loaded onto a lorry and was taken to Dijon, France, where it was rebuilt in a Catholic church that reopened after 25 years. A digital organ was installed at St. Paul's in place of the old pipe organ.

The old floor was taken up and replaced, and now consists of oak boards bonded to an insulated screed with underfloor heating. There were significant settlement problems in the chancel area which were resolved by underpinning.

WREN gave a grant of £50,000 towards the fund for the re-ordering, helping to pay for the community aspects of the new build.

In total, the re-ordering work took approximately ten weeks. During this time, a glass mosaic dating from the chancel's construction in 1897 was discovered, which had been hidden under a carpet. The mosaic was cleaned, and left in place.

=== Minor renovations and alterations ===
1867	New clock installed
1870	Coal-fired hot water heating installed, with cast iron pipes laid throughout the church
1871	New windows installed in nave
1900	Churchyard extended and consecrated by the Bishop of Lichfield and Coventry
1904	Gas lighting fitted, in the form of inverted gas mantles
1909	New pipe organ installed at a cost of £450
1921	Electric lighting fitted
1939	Chancel and choir vestry repaired and a concrete raft was built beneath the East Wall
1962	Heating changed from coal to oil
1994	East Wall underpinned to prevent the chancel from slipping away from the nave due to subsidence
1999	New clock installed
2008	Re-ordering of the interior of the church

== Clergy ==
The current vicar at St Paul's is the Rev Kate Massey.

1824	Revd. T. J. Crackett
1828	Revd. J. E. Jones
1831	Revd. T. R. Docker
1832	Revd. S. Backler
1839	Revd. Revd. H. Hake
1839	Revd. J. Price
1845	Revd. J. Bickerdike
1852	Revd. J. Coling
1857	Revd. J. Thomas
1864	Revd. C. E. Baskerville
1864	Revd. G. R. Pennington
1871	Revd. A. S. Webb
1884	Revd. W. C. Macdona
1885	Revd. J. B. Pattison
1895	Revd. G. E. Warlow
1903	Revd. J. H. Ashe
1920	Revd. J. M. Philpott
1927	Revd. J. Pratt
1951	Revd. E. Taylor
1958	Revd. P. G. Croft
1965	Revd. A. R. Hooton
1990	Revd. M. F. Vincent
2015	Revd. K. Massey

== Clock ==
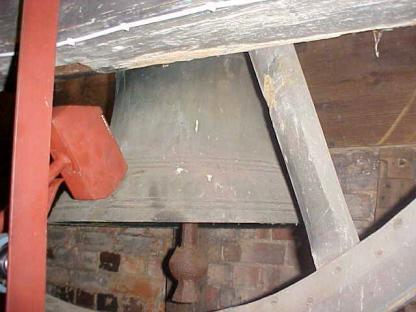
The bell in the tower, with hammer

When the tower was constructed in 1822–1823, it was fitted with a clock and bell.

In 1867 a new clock was installed by H Bright of Leamington Spa. Unfortunately, the clock stopped in the 1970s and was not repaired.

In the 1990s, the bell was deemed unsafe, fixed into position, and had its rope removed. In 1999, clockmakers Smith of Derby Group, restored the clock and bell. For the first time in 30 years, the clock chimed at midnight on 1 January 2000, to mark the new millennium.

With the bell now fixed in a rigid frame, the new clock mechanism uses a hammer to strike the bell. The new clock has three faces. The north and south faces are driven mechanically from the clock mechanism, while the west face is driven electronically.

== Memorials ==
=== First World War ===
In 1922, the stained glass east window was installed at a cost of just £500 as a memorial to the 201 people of the area who lost their lives in the First World War. It was designed and installed by Mr R Anning Bell.

To complete the memorial, oak panelling was erected underneath the window and was unveiled by Lieutenant CL Knox. A brass tablet, listing the names of the fallen soldiers, was revealed by Corporal W Beesley, and dedicated by Canon J Deed, vicar of Nuneaton.

The churchyard contains the war grave of a Royal Garrison Artillery soldier who died in 1918.

=== Second World War ===
In 1946, a memorial plaque in remembrance of the 17 men of the parish who died in the Second World War was unveiled underneath the 1914–18 memorial.

The 1st Battalion Cambridge Regiment was stationed at Arbury Hall in 1941. The soldiers worshipped at St Paul's, but 343 lost their lives between 1942 and 1945 on active duty in the Far East. A plaque in memory of the men was fastened next to the war memorial.

== Connection with George Eliot ==
George Eliot, in her book "Scenes of Clerical Life" referred to Stockingford as Paddiford Common. St Paul's church is mentioned as the 'chapel of ease'. The character Revd. Tryan is based upon the Revd. John Edmund Jones who was the vicar at St Paul's 1828–1831, and the character Mr Landor is based upon Mr Craddock, who laid the foundation stone of the church in 1822.

== See also ==
- List of Commissioners' churches in the English Midlands
