= Nuneaton =

Market town in Warwickshire, England

Coordinates: 52.523°N 1.468°W

- Town
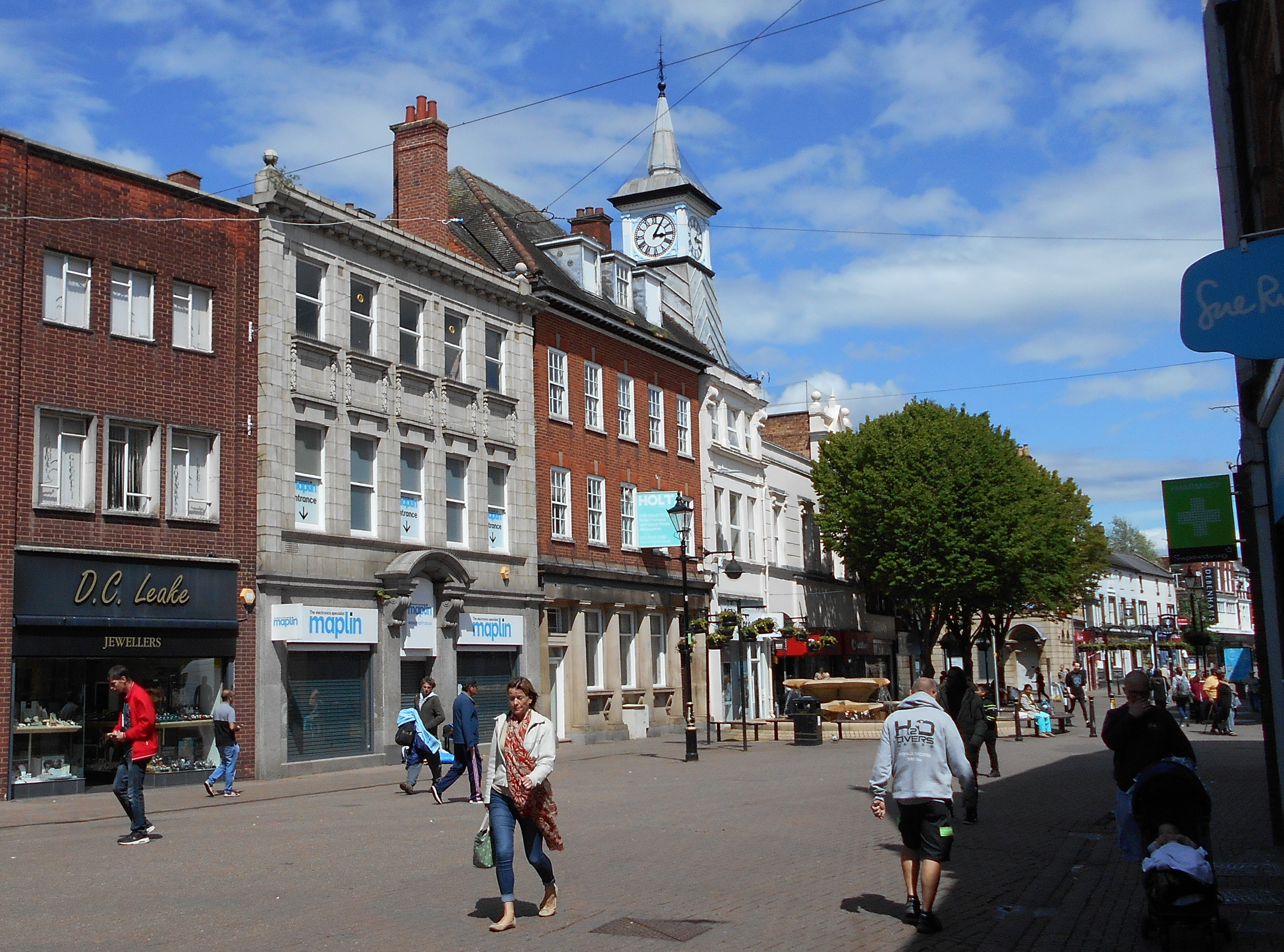
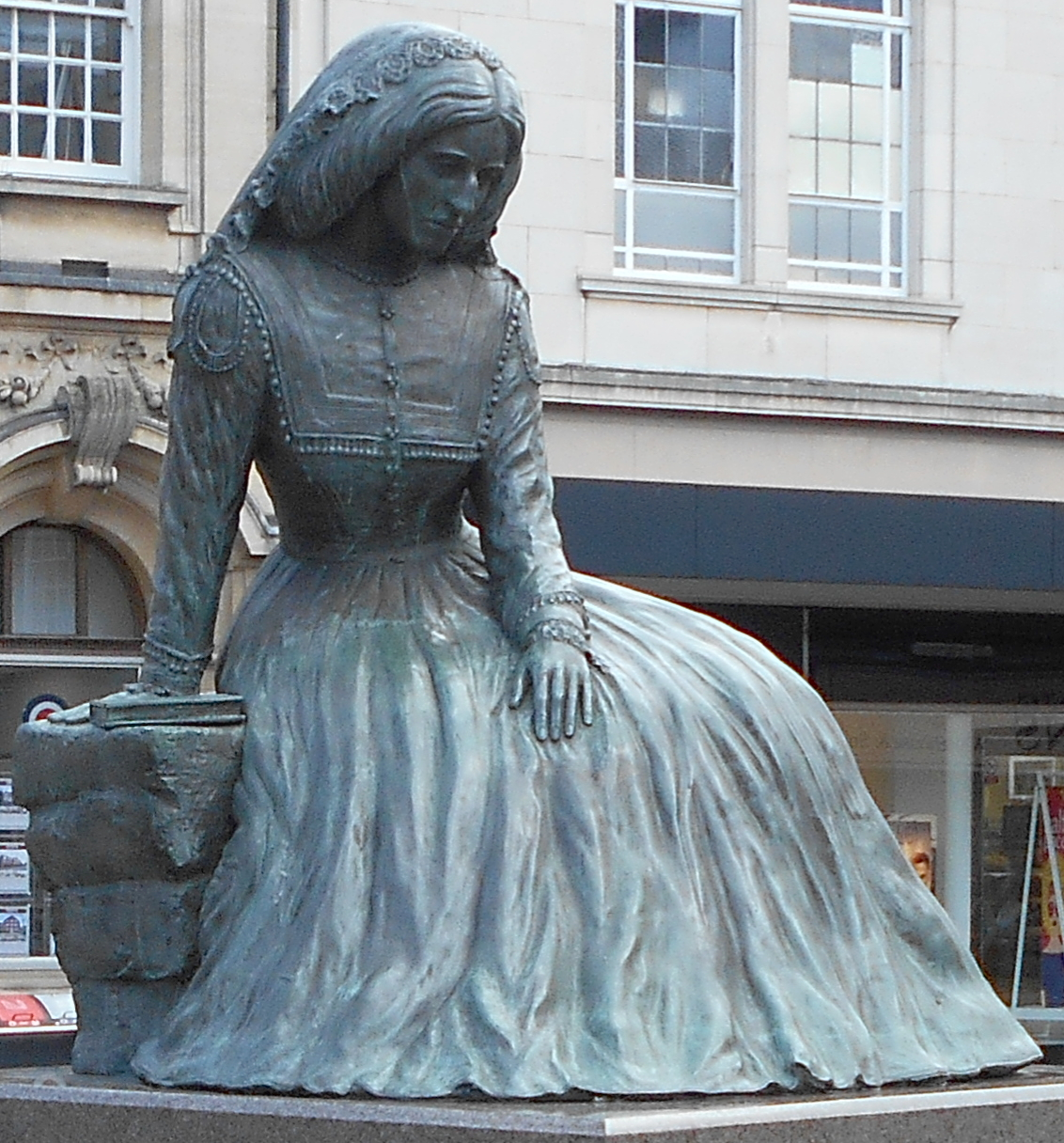
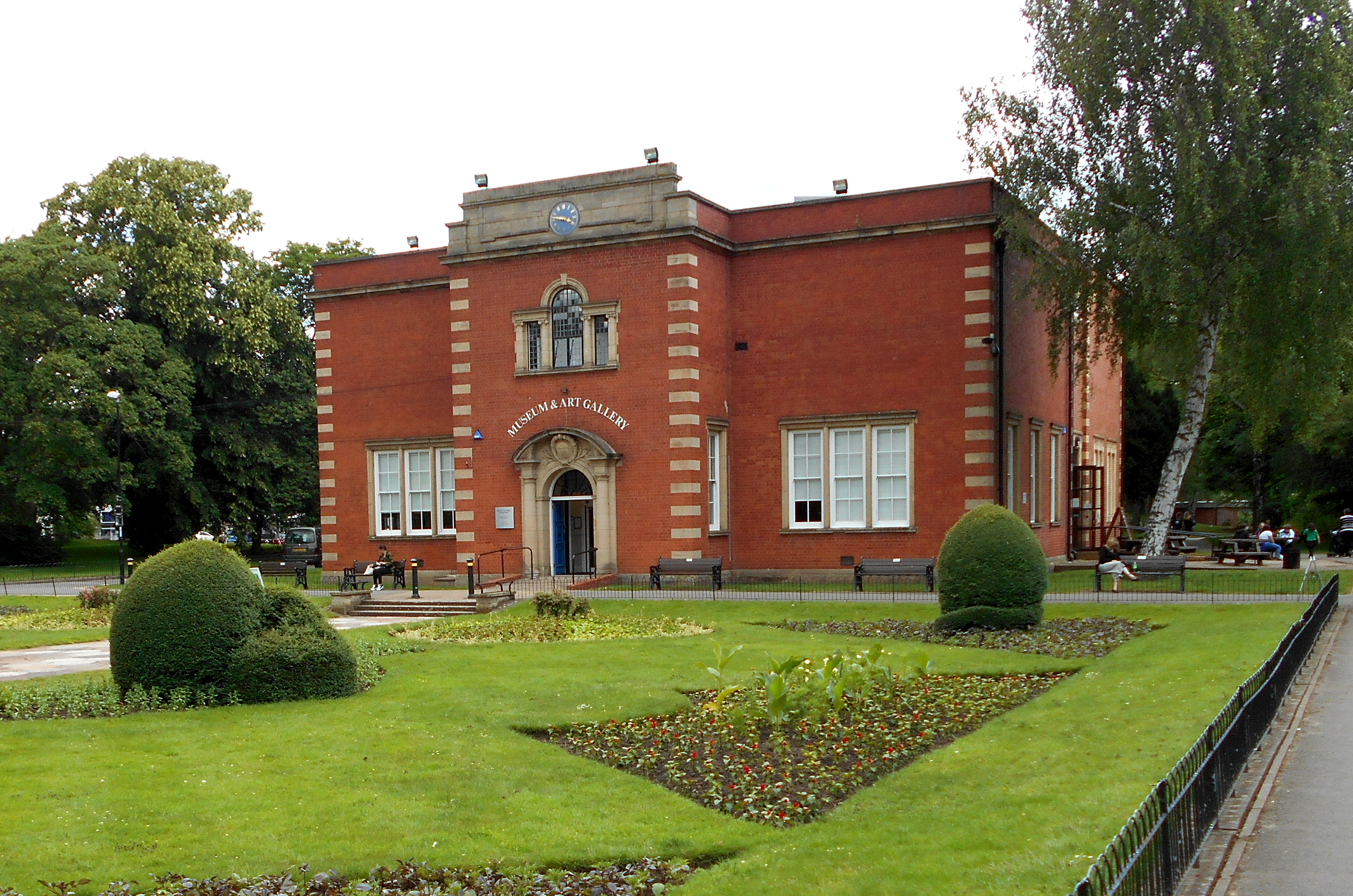
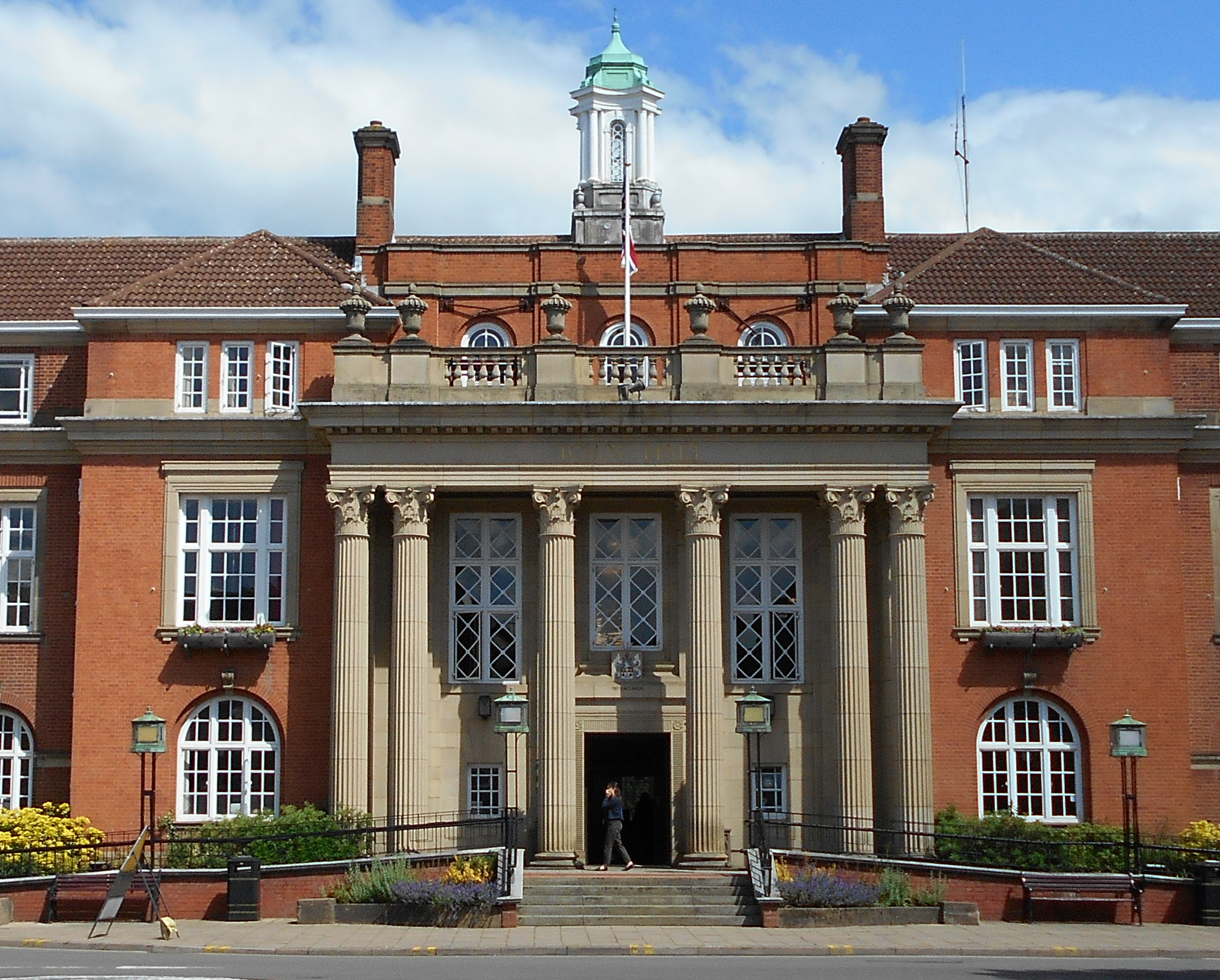
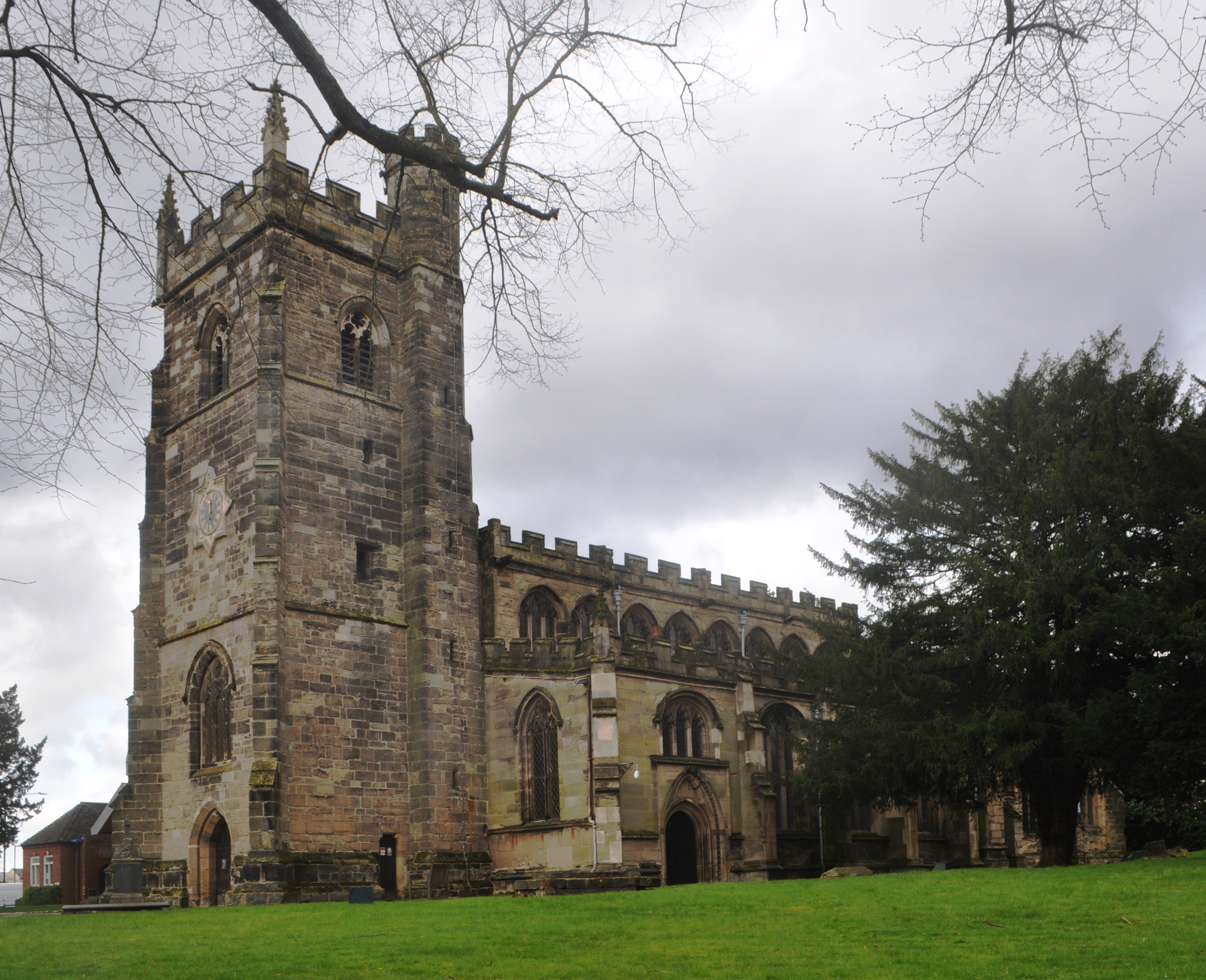
- Market Place George Eliot Statue Museum and Art Gallery Town Hall St Nicolas Church

- Location within Warwickshire
- Population: 88,813 (2021 census)
- OS grid reference: SP361918
- District: Nuneaton and Bedworth
- Shire county: Warwickshire
- Region: West Midlands
- Country: England
- Sovereign state: United Kingdom
- Post town: NUNEATON
- Postcode district: CV10, CV11
- Dialling code: 024
- Police: Warwickshire
- Fire: Warwickshire
- Ambulance: West Midlands
- UK Parliament: Nuneaton
- Website: https://www.nuneatonandbedworth.gov.uk/

Nuneaton (/nəˈniːtən/ nə-NEE-tən) is a market town in the Nuneaton and Bedworth district, in northern Warwickshire, England, close to the county border with Leicestershire to the north-east. Nuneaton's population at the 2021 census was 88,813, making it the largest town in Warwickshire. Nuneaton's urban area, which also includes the large villages of Bulkington and Hartshill, had a population of 99,372 at the 2021 census.

Nuneaton gained its name from a medieval nunnery which was established in the 12th century, when it became a small market town. It later developed into an important industrial town due to ribbon weaving and coal mining.

The author George Eliot was born on a farm on the Arbury Estate just outside Nuneaton in 1819 and lived in the town for much of her early life. Her novel Scenes of Clerical Life (1858) depicts Nuneaton. The George Eliot Hospital is named after her, and there is also a statue of her in the town centre.

== History ==
=== Early history ===
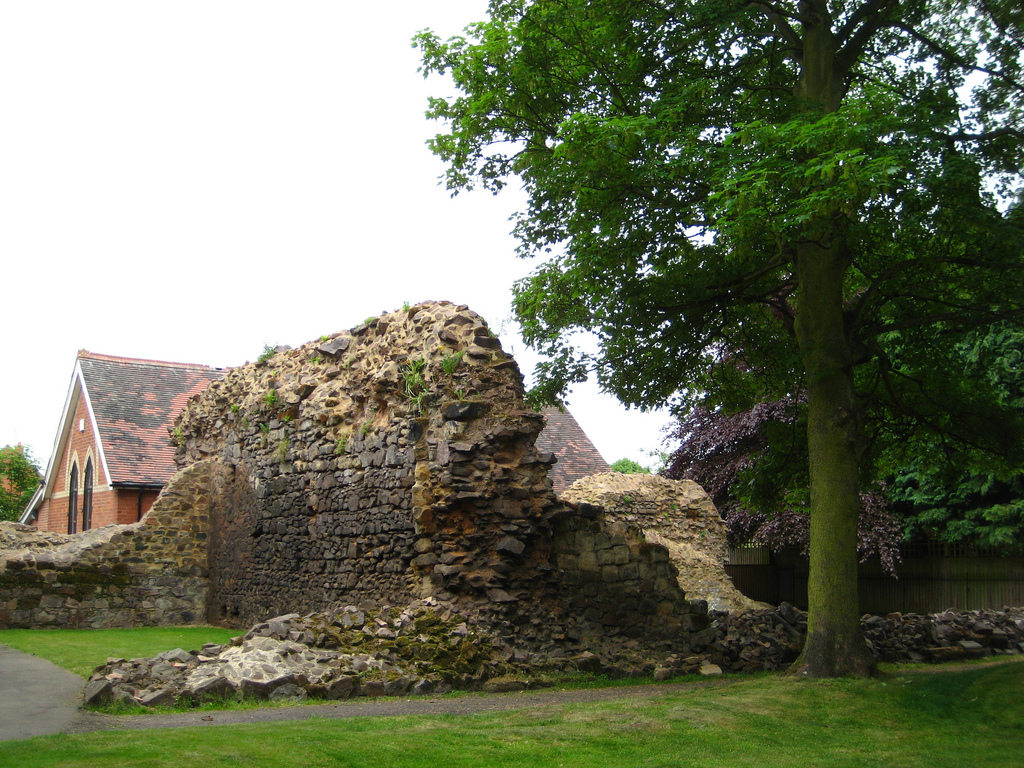
Some ruins of Nuneaton Priory from which the town gained its name. Part of the church was reconstructed in the 19th and early 20th centuries

Nuneaton was originally an Anglo-Saxon settlement known as 'Etone' or 'Eaton', which translates literally as 'settlement by water', referring to the River Anker. 'Etone' was listed in the Domesday Book as a small farming settlement with a population of around 150. In the early 12th century, the settlement came under the control of the Beaumont family, and in around 1155 Robert de Beaumont granted his manor of Etone to the French Abbey of Fontevraud, who established a Benedictine nunnery here, which became known as Nuneaton Priory. This led to Etone becoming known as Nuneaton. A document from 1272 referred to the town as Nunne Eton. The nunnery was closed in 1539 during King Henry VIII's dissolution of the monasteries, and subsequently fell into ruin. Some ruins remain, and part of the Abbey church was rebuilt in the 19th and early 20th centuries.

Nuneaton obtained a market charter in around 1160 from Henry II which was reconfirmed in 1226, causing Nuneaton to develop into a market town and become the economic focal point of the local villages.

In 1485, the Battle of Bosworth, the last significant battle of the Wars of the Roses, was fought around 5 miles (8 km) to the north-west of Nuneaton, across the Leicestershire border

King Edward VI School was established in 1552 by a royal charter by King Edward VI. The school was originally a fee-paying school, although the county council provided some scholarships, and became non-fee-paying as a result of the Education Act of 1944. The voluntary aided school had around 400 boys in the 1960s. In 1974 the grammar school closed and was re-established as a sixth form college.

In 1543, Nuneaton was recorded as containing 169 houses, with a population of around 800. By 1670 this had grown to 415 households, with a population of 1,867, and by 1740 the population had risen further to 2,480.

=== The growth of industry ===
==== Ribbon weaving ====
In the mid-17th century, a silk ribbon weaving industry became established in the local area which included Nuneaton, Bedworth, Coventry and much of North Warwickshire. This industry was enhanced by the arrival of French Huguenot immigrants in the latter part of the century, who brought with them new techniques. This industry operated as a cottage industry, with the weavers working from top-shops; a type of building which was specific to the local area, and had living space in the two lower floors, and a workshop with very large windows on the top floor. This industry flourished for nearly two centuries, albeit with periodic booms and slumps. However, by the early 19th century the industry was struggling to compete against the factory produced textiles from northern manufacturers, and the local weavers strongly resisted adopting factory production methods as they valued their independence. Nevertheless, in 1851 46% of Nuneaton's workforce was still employed by the ribbon trade. The industry was finally wiped out after 1860 by cheap imports, following the Cobden–Chevalier Treaty, which removed duties on imported French silks. This caused a slump in the local economy which lasted nearly two decades.

==== Coal mining ====
Another major industry which grew in the local area was coal mining. Nuneaton was located in the Warwickshire coalfield, and mining was recorded locally as early as 1338. However the lack of efficient transport and the primitive mining techniques kept the industry on a small scale. Mining did not start to develop on a larger scale until the 17th century, with the dawn of the Industrial Revolution, which led to greater demand for fuel and technical advancement. A major problem was the drainage of water from coal pits as they were dug deeper. The use of a waterwheel to drive drainage pumps was recorded as early as 1683. The first recorded use of an atmospheric engine; a primitive form of steam engine, to pump water from coal pits was recorded at Griff Colliery in 1714; this was the first recorded use of a steam engine in Warwickshire. Another major problem facing the industry was poor transport. Sir Roger Newdigate, who owned several local coal mines, developed a turnpike road to Coventry in the 1750s, which partially resolved this problem. Early on Newdigate recognised the potential of canals as a means for transporting bulk cargoes. He developed a system of private canals on his land on the Arbury Estate from 1764 to transport coal, and helped promote the Coventry Canal, which opened from Coventry to Nuneaton in 1769, before being finally completed to Staffordshire in 1790. He also helped promote the Oxford Canal. Ironically, the new canal system led to a decline in the Warwickshire coal industry after 1800, as it was exploited by Staffordshire coal producers to capture the local market. The local coal industry was not exploited to its maximum potential until the development of the railway network in the 19th century.

The first railway to reach Nuneaton was the Trent Valley Railway which opened in 1847, linking Nuneaton to the growing national railway network at Rugby and Stafford. This was followed by a branch line to Coventry in 1850. In 1864 a line was opened from Birmingham to Leicester via Nuneaton, and this proved to be the most important for the local economy, as it linked Nuneaton with the rapidly growing town (later city) of Birmingham. Due largely to this, the local coal industry expanded rapidly in the latter half of the 19th century, with production from the Warwickshire coalfield expanding nearly tenfold between 1860 and 1913 from around 545,000 tons to over five million tons. The industry peaked in the early 20th century; in 1911 one third of the male workforce in Nuneaton were employed as miners. The industry, however, declined rapidly in the 1950s and 1960s, with the last coal mine in Nuneaton closing in 1968, although Newdigate colliery at Bedworth lasted until 1982. The last Warwickshire coal mine at nearby Daw Mill closed in 2013.

==== Other industries ====
Nuneaton underwent a period of rapid growth from the 1880s onwards with the rapid development of an array of industries. These included brick and tile making, brewing, the production of hats and leather goods. and engineering. At the time of the first national census in 1801 Nuneaton was one of the largest towns in Warwickshire, with a population of 5,135. By 1901 this had grown to 24,996.

=== Civic history ===
Nuneaton was an ancient parish, which covered the hamlets of Attleborough and Stockingford as well as the town itself. The parish was made a local board district in 1850, which was Nuneaton's first modern form of local government; previously it had been governed by its vestry and manorial court. The local board's main responsibilities were to provide the town with infrastructure such as paved roads, clean drinking water, street lighting and sewerage. The neighbouring parish of Chilvers Coton was made a separate local board district at the same time.

The two local board districts of Nuneaton and Chilvers Cotton were merged in 1893. The following year, all such districts were converted into urban districts. The Nuneaton and Chilvers Coton Urban District was elevated to become a municipal borough in 1907 under the single name of Nuneaton. The borough was enlarged several times, notably in 1931 when it absorbed the neighbouring parish of Weddington. In 1974, the Municipal Borough of Nuneaton was merged with Bedworth Urban District to create a non-metropolitan district with borough status which was initially called Nuneaton, but changed its name to Nuneaton and Bedworth in 1980.

Nuneaton and Bedworth will be abolished in 2028 as part of the 2027–28 local government reforms, and replaced by a new unitary authority of North Warwickshire, which will combine the area of Nuneaton and Bedworth with the neighbouring Warwickshire districts of North Warwickshire and Rugby.

=== Second World War ===
Nuneaton suffered severe bomb damage during The Blitz in the Second World War between 1940 and 1942. The heaviest bombing raid on Nuneaton took place on 17 May 1941, when 130 people were killed. 380 houses were destroyed, and over 10,000 damaged during the course of the war.

=== Postwar to present ===
In 1947 the architect and town planner Frederick Gibberd was appointed to create a masterplan to redevelop the bomb damaged town centre. The redevelopment, which continued until the 1960s included the features typical of town planning from that era, including a new ringroad, indoor shopping centre, administrative centre and library.

Nuneaton continued to expand in the latter 20th century. In the early postwar years the need arose for low-cost housing, and in response to this around 2,500 council houses were built during the 1950s, the largest such development was at Camp Hill, where 1,400 new houses were built by 1956, while around 1,100 new council houses were built at new estates at Hill Top, Caldwell and Marston Lane by 1958. Following this, Nuneaton's expansion was largely driven by private developments at Weddington, St Nicolas Park, Whitestone and Stockingford.

=== Historic population ===
Year	1801	1851	1871	1881	1901	1911	1921	1931	1951	1971	2001	2011	2021
Population	5,135	13,532	12,868	13,714	24,996	37,073	41,875	46,291	54,407	66,979	70,721	86,552	88,813

== Geography ==
Nuneaton is 9 miles (14 km) north of Coventry, 18 miles (29 km) east of Birmingham and 16 miles (26 km) south west of Leicester.

The town centre lies 2 miles (3 km) south west of the Leicestershire border (which is defined by the A5 road the former Roman Watling Street), 8 miles (13 km) south east of Staffordshire, and 12 miles (19 km) south-south east from Derbyshire’s southernmost point.

Nuneaton lies very close to the geographic centre of England, which since 2002 has been recognised as being at Lindley Hall Farm, about 3 miles (5 km) north of Nuneaton, across the county border in Leicestershire.

The River Anker runs through the town. Nuneaton town centre was historically prone to regular flooding from the Anker, with especially bad floods in 1932 and 1968. This was relieved in 1976 by the construction of a flood relief channel.

Nuneaton forms the largest part of the Nuneaton built-up area which also includes the large villages of Hartshill and Bulkington. It had a population of 132,236 at the 2001 Census. In the 2011 Census it had a considerably lower population of 92,698 because Hinckley ceased to be defined as part of the urban area. In the 2021 Census the urban area was recorded as having a population of 99,372, and comprising Nuneaton, Bulkington and Hartshill.

Towns close to Nuneaton include Bedworth, Atherstone and Hinckley, with Tamworth, Rugby, Coleshill and Lutterworth a little further afield.

=== Districts and suburbs of Nuneaton ===
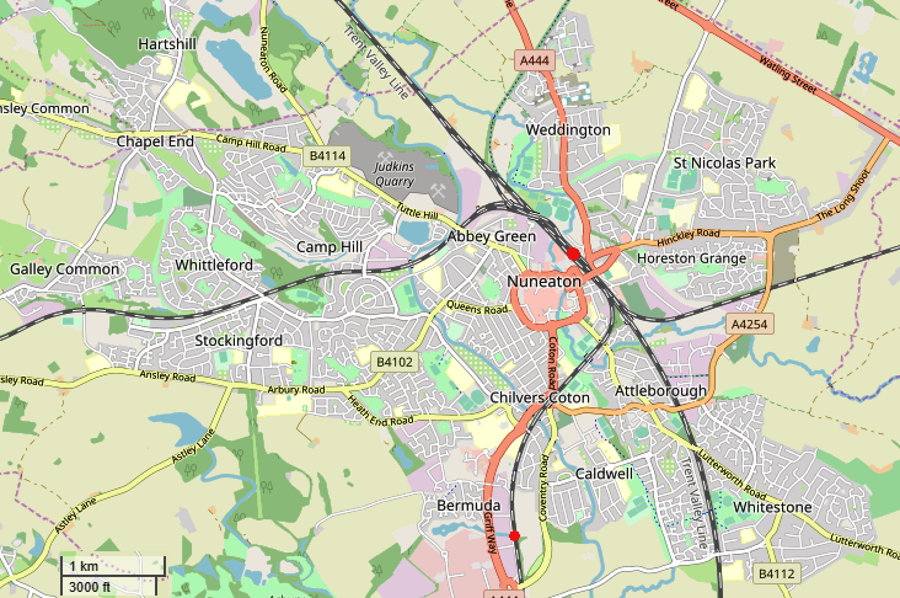
A map of Nuneaton

Within the borough boundaries:

- Abbey Green
- Arbury
- Attleborough (including Maple Park)
- Bermuda
- Caldwell
- Camp Hill
- Chapel End (including The Shires)
- Chilvers Coton
- Galley Common
- Griff
- Grove Farm
- Heath End
- Hill Top
- Horeston Grange
- Robinson's End
- St Nicolas Park
- Stockingford
- Weddington
- Whitestone
- Whittleford

Adjacent or adjoining places, some of which fall outside the borough boundaries:

- Ansley
- Bulkington
- Caldecote
- Hartshill

== Politics ==
=== National ===
Nuneaton is part of the constituency of the same name in the House of Commons. The constituency is currently represented by the Labour Party Member of Parliament (MP), Jodie Gosling who was first elected in the 2024 general election.

From 1935 to 1983, Nuneaton was a safe Labour seat, but it has become more marginal. Between 1983 and 1992, the Conservative Party held the seat, until losing it back to Labour. For the next 18 years, the Labour Party (in the form of Bill Olner) was the local representative at Parliament, until his retirement. The Conservatives won it back at the 2010 general election, with Marcus Jones holding the seat until 2024.

=== Local ===
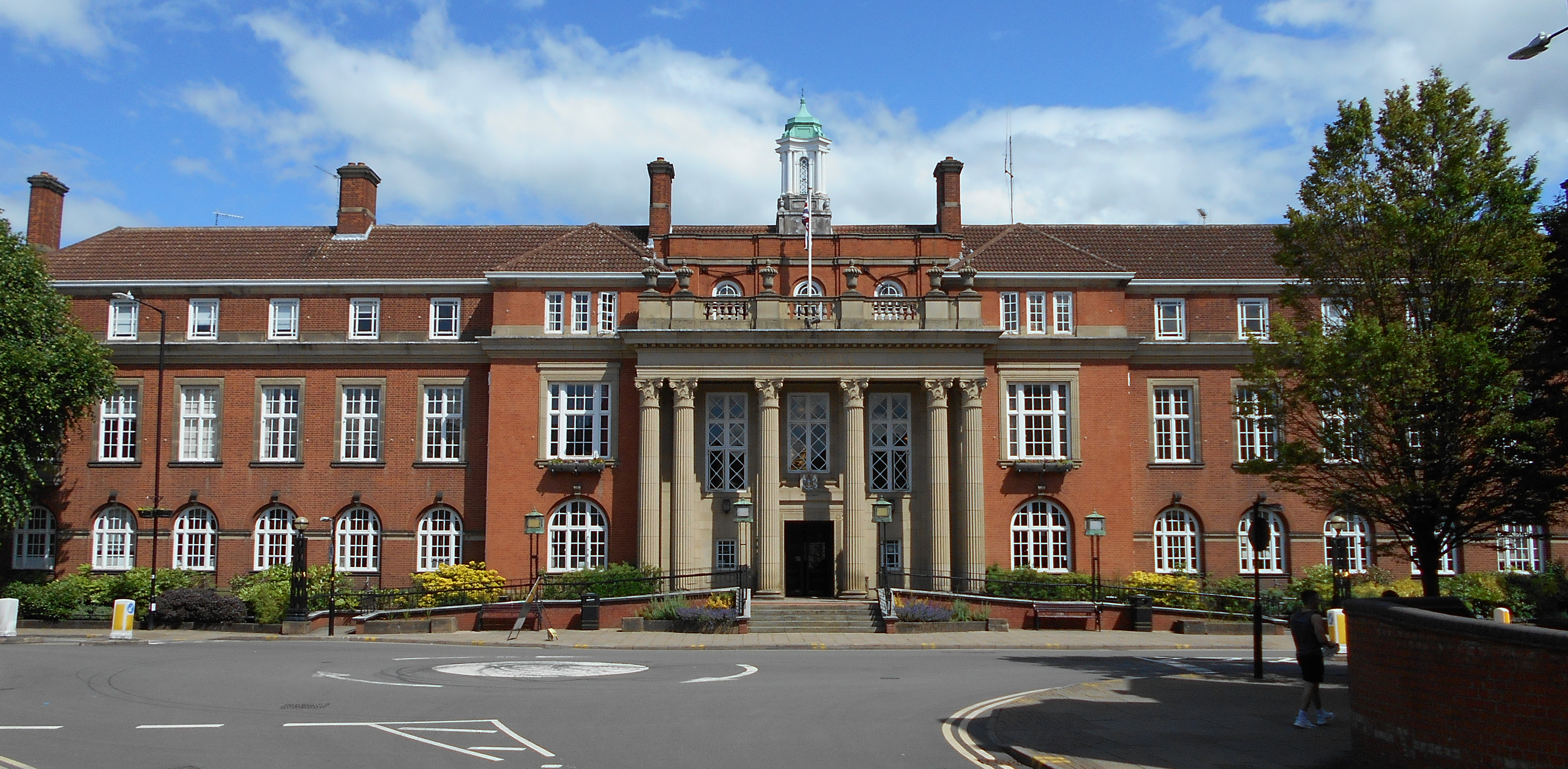
Nuneaton Town Hall (1934) the headquarters of Nuneaton and Bedworth Borough Council.

There are two tiers of local government covering Nuneaton: Nuneaton and Bedworth Borough Council as the lower tier, and Warwickshire County Council as the upper tier. Nuneaton is an unparished area and so there is no tier of administration below the Borough council. Nuneaton and Bedworth council was once solidly controlled by the Labour Party, but has in more recent years become more volatile: It was Labour controlled from its creation in 1974, until the 2008 local elections, when the Conservatives gained control, ending 34 years of Labour rule. However, the period of Conservative control was relatively short lived. The Labour Party won two seats from the Conservative Party in the 2010 local elections, giving no party overall control of the council (but leaving the Labour Party as the largest grouping). In 2012 Labour gained a further 8 seats to regain overall control which they lost again to no overall control in 2018. In the May 2021 elections, the Conservatives once more gained a majority; winning ten seats from Labour and one from an independent. However, the pendulum swung back again in the May 2024 elections, when Labour again won back control of the council, winning 15 seats. In the May 2026 elections, Reform UK became the largest party on the council, winning 15 of the 19 seats up for election.

== Economy ==
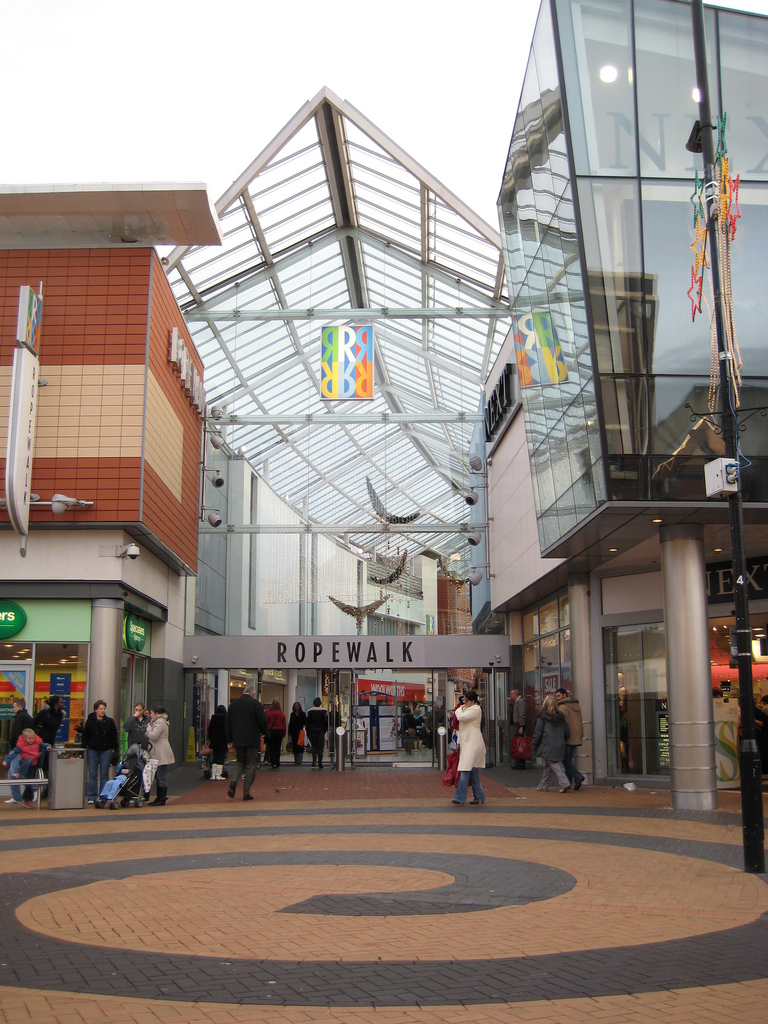
Ropewalk Shopping Centre

Nuneaton's traditional industries like textiles, mining and manufacturing have declined significantly in the post-war years. Due to its transport links, Nuneaton is to some extent a commuter town for nearby Coventry and Birmingham. However a relatively large number of businesses involved in the automotive, aerospace and engineering supply chains industries are active in the area. MIRA Limited, formerly the Motor Industry Research Association, is based on a disused wartime airfield on the A5, to the north of the town.

One of the biggest developments in the town's history, the multimillion-pound Ropewalk Shopping Centre, opened in September 2005 in the hope that it will give the town extra income from the shopping, attract more visitors and retailers, and attract shoppers as an alternative to larger retail centres such as Birmingham, Coventry, Leicester and Solihull. An older shopping centre, the Abbeygate Shopping Centre in the town centre was first opened in the 1960s, and was formerly known as Heron Way.

The European headquarters of Holland & Barrett are based in the town, as is the UK head office of FedEx. While Bermuda Park, which is south of Nuneaton, is the location of the national distribution centres of Dairy Crest and RS Components. Nuneaton is also the location of several international online marketing companies.

In 2017 the Nuneaton and Bedworth borough was less prosperous than the rest of Warwickshire, reflecting the long established north–south divide in the county. The average annual workplace wage in Nuneaton and Bedworth was £21,981, the lowest in the county and below the Warwickshire average of £28,513 (and UK £28,296) although the productivity gap had narrowed with the rest of Warwickshire since 2009.

== Religion ==
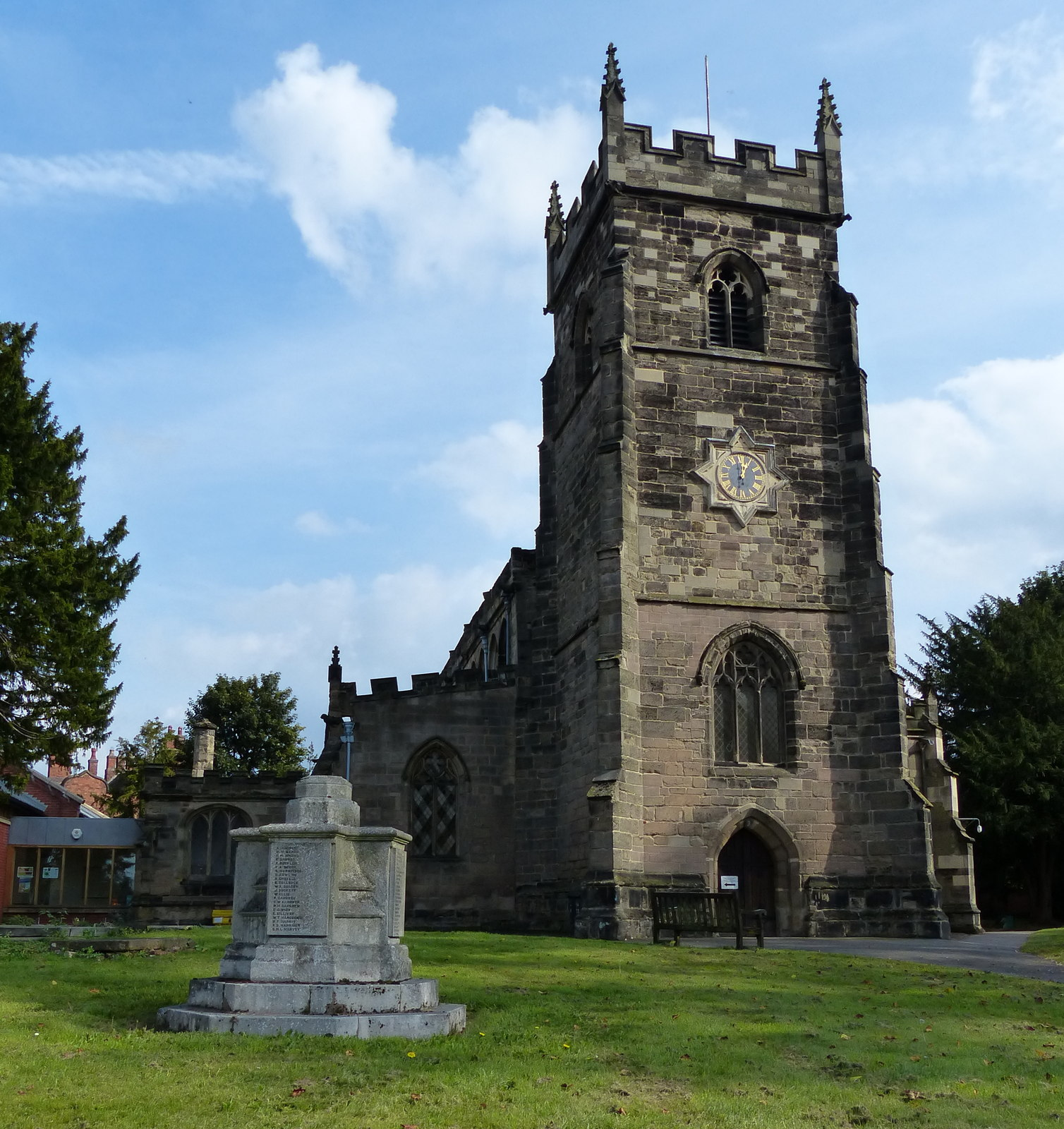
St Nicolas Parish Church

Nuneaton's name reflects the effect that Christianity has had upon the town's history. Although the Benedictine nunnery which gave the town its name was destroyed at the time of the Reformation, the remaining fragments were incorporated into the Anglican church building now known as the Abbey Church of St Mary the Virgin in Manor Court Road. This is a Victorian and early 20th century construction.

=== Church of England ===
Near the town centre, but unusually not a part of it and outside the ring road, lies the medieval church of St. Nicolas – a grade I listed building. Chilvers Coton contains All Saints' Church, where Mary Ann Evans (George Eliot) worshipped and Justin Welby, later Archbishop of Canterbury, served as a curate. This was badly damaged by bombing during the Second World War, and rebuilt largely by German prisoners of war. There are also Anglican churches in Weddington (St James's), Attleborough (Holy Trinity), Stockingford (St Paul's), Galley Common (St Peter's), Abbey Green (St Mary's), and more recently built (1954), in Camp Hill St Mary's and St John's.

=== Roman Catholic Church ===
There are two parishes in the town serving the Catholic community in Nuneaton. Our Lady of the Angels on Coton Road, was opened in 1838 (originally as St Mary's). The building, designed by Joseph Hansom, was extensively remodelled in 1936. The Parish of St Anne's, Chapel End, Nuneaton was created in 1949 out of the Parish of Our Lady of the Angels (which originally covered the whole town). The original church building was replaced with the existing church, which was opened in 2000.

=== Other Christian traditions ===
In the town, Baptist, Methodist, Wesleyan Reform Union, the Church of Jesus Christ of Latter-day Saints, Pentecostal, the Salvation Army, United Reformed and Christadelphian churches serve their respective congregations.

There is a Kingdom Hall of Jehovah's Witnesses located in the Stockingford area and Christadelphians in Whitestone.

=== Other religions ===
In addition to Christianity, there are also followers of Islam, Sikhism and Hinduism. There is a mosque on Frank Street, Chilvers Coton, and two gurdwaras (Sikh temples): the Nuneaton Guru Nanak Gurdwara in Park Avenue, Attleborough, and the Shri Guru Tegh Bahadur Gurdwara in Marlborough Road, Chilvers Coton. There are also two Hindu temples in Nuneaton: the Shree Hindu Gujrati Samaj on Upper Abbey Street, and a second Hindu temple, the Watford Kantha Swami Hindu Temple, which opened in 2021, using a converted former Methodist Chapel in Stockingford.

In addition to these, there is an active Bahá'i Faith group in Nuneaton.

== Demographics ==
At the 2021 census, there were 88,813 residents in Nuneaton. In terms of ethnicity in 2021:

- 87.3% of Nuneaton residents were White
- 8.4% were Asian
- 1.8% were Black
- 1.8% were Mixed.
- 0.9% were from another ethnic group.

In terms of religion, 50.7% of Nuneaton residents identified as Christian, 40.2% said they had no religion, 4.1% were Muslim, 1.8% were Hindu, 1.6% were Sikh, 0.7% were Buddhists, and 0.8% were from another religion.

== Transport ==
=== Road ===
The town is near the M6, the M42 and M69 motorways and the main A5 trunk road (Watling Street), which also acts as a border with Leicestershire and the neighbouring town of Hinckley. The A444 provides a high-speed dual-carriageway route into the town from the south and also acts as the often busy town centre ring road. The A47 links the town with neighbouring Hinckley and onwards to Leicester, and the A4254 – Eastern Relief Road – provides direct access from the east of Nuneaton to the south, avoiding the town centre.

=== Railway ===
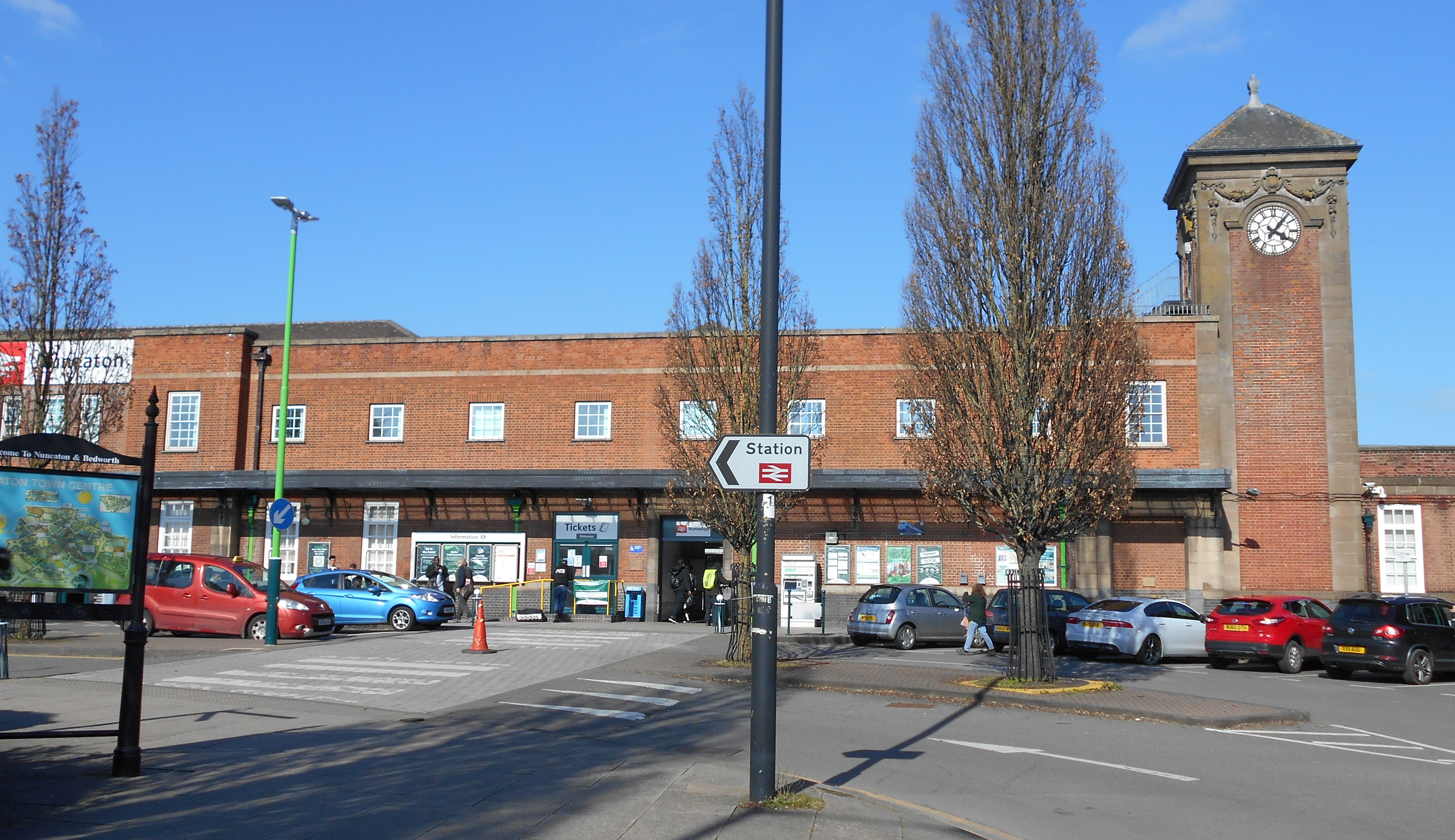
Nuneaton railway station

The town has two railway stations. The main Nuneaton railway station, located near the town centre, is an important railway junction and is served by the West Coast Main Line running from London to the North West, the cross-country Birmingham to Peterborough Line and by a line to Coventry via Bedworth. A new railway station at Bermuda Park was opened south of the town centre in 2016 on the line towards Coventry, as part of the NUCKLE (Nuneaton, Coventry, Kenilworth and Leamington) rail upgrade scheme.

Historically, Nuneaton was also served by Chilvers Coton station, Abbey Street station and Stockingford station. Chilvers Coton station was located on the Coventry line, a short distance north of the new Bermuda Park station, and was closed in 1965. Abbey Street station and Stockingford station were on the line towards Birmingham and were both closed in 1968. In January 2017, there were proposals to open a new station at Stockingford, at a different location from the former one, which could open by 2023. Warwickshire County Council have also proposed a new Nuneaton Parkway station between Nuneaton and Hinckley, which could open by 2034.

=== Bus ===
The principal operator around Nuneaton is Stagecoach in Warwickshire and the depot is located next to the fire station on Newtown Road, just west from the bus station. Arriva Midlands also operate a number of routes around Nuneaton with buses running to Tamworth, Hinckley, Barwell, Leicester, and MIRA. Stagecoach Midlands now operate to Walsgrave Hospital, on 74 and 78 former ex services operated by Travel de Courcey until the company entered administration in 2020.

In January 2020 NX Coventry announced an extension to Nuneaton on their 20 route from Coventry to Bedworth.

=== Canal ===
The Coventry Canal passes through Nuneaton, while the Ashby Canal skirts the town's south-eastern outskirts.

== Recreation and culture ==
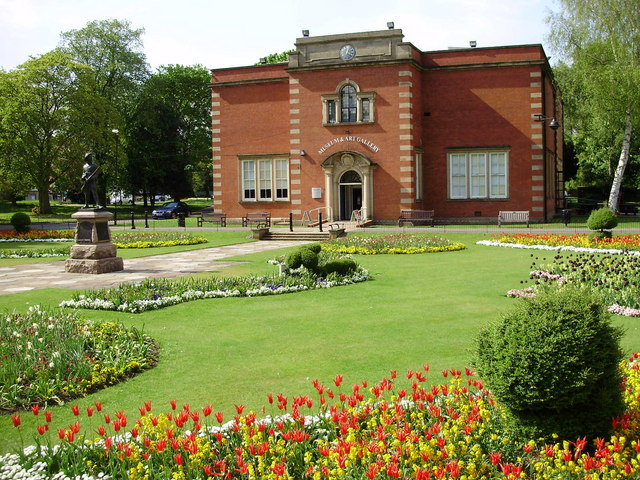
Nuneaton Museum and Art Gallery, Riversley Park, home of collection on writer George Eliot

Nuneaton has two non-league football teams: Nuneaton Borough and Nuneaton Griff who both play in the Midland Football League. Sunday League football is played in the town, with teams from Nuneaton, Bedworth and North Warwickshire competing in the Nuneaton & District Sunday Football League (NDSFL).

There are three rugby union clubs: Nuneaton R.F.C. (nicknamed "the Nuns"), who play in National 3 Midlands, Nuneaton Old Edwardians of Midlands 2 West (South) division and Manor Park of the Midlands 3 West (South) league.

The town is also the location of Nuneaton Bowling club, where flat green bowls is played.

There are three main leisure centres and one stadium in the town owned by Nuneaton and Bedworth Borough Council and managed by Everyone Active on the council's behalf (after a competitive tender process):

Pingles Leisure Centre	The town's main leisure centre in Nuneaton. Rebuilt in 2004 to replace the original Pingles built in 1965. Includes an indoor and outdoor swimming areas, dance studio and gym.
Pingles Stadium	Built in 1998. Capacity 4,000, with a 250-seater stand, athletics track, and football pitch. The stadium is home to Nuneaton Harriers Athletic Club, Nuneaton Griff Football Club and Nuneaton Triathlon Club.
Jubilee Sports Centre	This sports hall is used for various sports including badminton, five-a-side football/indoor football and basketball. There is also a scoreboard, used for major basketball and indoor football matches. The hall can be hired out for uses such as karate lessons.
Etone Sports Centre	Another sports hall. Also has astroturf football pitches which are used also for hockey. The centre is in the grounds of the school which bears the same name, Etone School, but 'Everyone Active' maintains the building.

Nuneaton has a museum and art gallery in the grounds of Riversley Park adjacent to the town centre. The museum includes a display on George Eliot. Eliot's family home Griff House is now a restaurant and hotel on the A444.

The Abbey Theatre is Nuneaton's only theatre and hosts a wide variety of performances including visiting opera and ballet companies, touring shows, musicals, pantomime and drama. Run solely by volunteers, the Abbey Theatre seats 250 plus space for wheelchair patrons.

Also located in Nuneaton on Abbey Street is the Ritz Cinema. It is Grade-II listed due to its Art Deco style.

Historically, Nuneaton used to take part in the Britain in Bloom competition and in 2000, Nuneaton and Bedworth was a national finalist. It is the location of Nuneaton Carnival, the largest carnival in Warwickshire, which takes place every June.

Nuneaton was home to the smallest independent newspaper in Britain (the Heartland Evening News) until it was purchased in 2006 by life News & Media.

Public art in Nuneaton includes a statue of George Eliot on Newdegate Square, and the Gold Belt.

=== George Eliot's inspirations ===
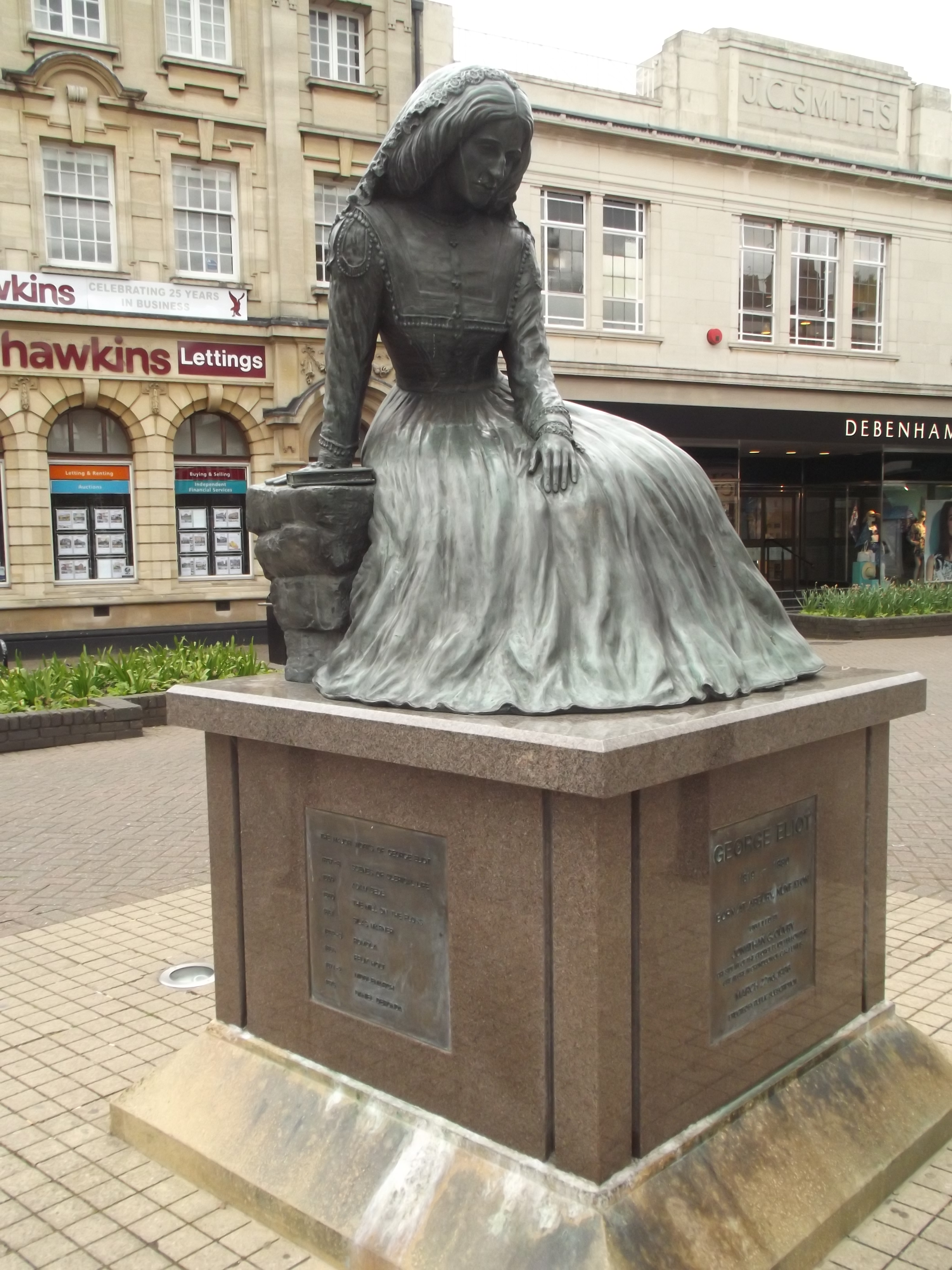
Statue of George Eliot on Newdegate Square

Many locations in George Eliot's works were based on places in or near her native Nuneaton, including:

- Milby (town and parish church, based on Nuneaton and St Nicolas parish church);
- Shepperton (based on Chilvers Coton);
- Paddiford Common (based on Stockingford, which at the time had a large area of common land, including its parish Church of St Paul's);
- Knebley (based on Astley; Knebley Church is Astley Church, while Knebley Abbey is Astley Castle);
- Red Deeps (based on Griff Hollows);
- Cheverel Manor (based on Arbury Hall);
- Dorlcote Mill (based on Griff House);
- The Red Lion (based on the Bull Hotel, now the George Eliot Hotel in Bridge Street, Nuneaton);
- Middlemarch (based on Coventry);
- Treby Magna (also thought to be based on Coventry);
- Little Treby (thought to be based on Stoneleigh);
- Transome Court (thought to be based on Stoneleigh Abbey).

=== Nuneaton Community Carnival ===
The Nuneaton Community Carnival carnival originated in 1930 as the Nuneaton Hospital Carnival, organised to raise funds for Nuneaton General Hospital and associated charitable causes. The first event was held in October 1930 and included a procession and ceremonial elements such as the crowning of a carnival queen.

The event became a recurring feature of the town’s social calendar during the 1930s but was suspended during the Second World War. In the post-war period the carnival was revived intermittently, before being more consistently re-established in the 1960s.

The 2024 carnival was cancelled. The event was subsequently revived in 2025 by the Nuneaton Community Carnival Committee.The carnival is organised by a volunteer committee and aims to promote community participation and local heritage.

The carnival traditionally includes a public procession through Nuneaton, decorated floats and themed entries, participation from schools and community groups, and live entertainment in the town centre. In recent years, annual themes have been adopted for parade entrants.

== Landmarks ==
A local landmark in Nuneaton, which can be seen for many miles is Mount Judd which is a conical shaped former spoil heap, 158 metres (518 ft) high made from spoil from the former Judkins Quarry. It is also known locally as the Nuneaton Nipple. In May 2018 it was voted the best UK landmark in an online poll for the Daily Mirror newspaper, beating competition from the likes of the Angel of the North and Big Ben.

Another well known landmark is the Roanne Fountain, also known as the Dandelion Fountain, which sits in the middle of a roundabout in the town centre, it was built in 2000, and features 385 spraying arms which spray out 50,000 gallons of water per hour. In 2016 it was voted the 'UK Roundabout of the Year' by the Roundabout Appreciation Society, who stated that the town should feel "very proud for achieving such a high roundabout accolade."

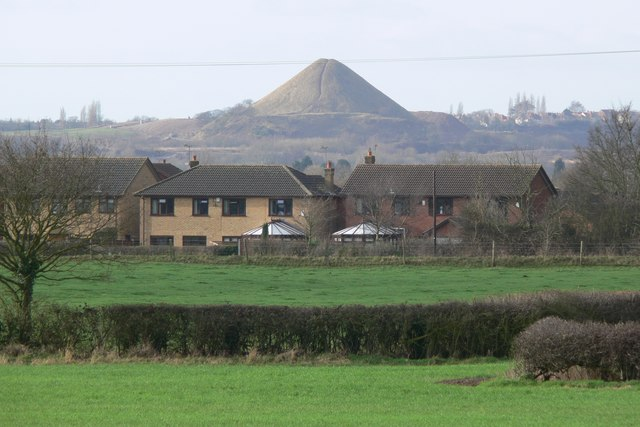
Mount Judd, viewed from the north

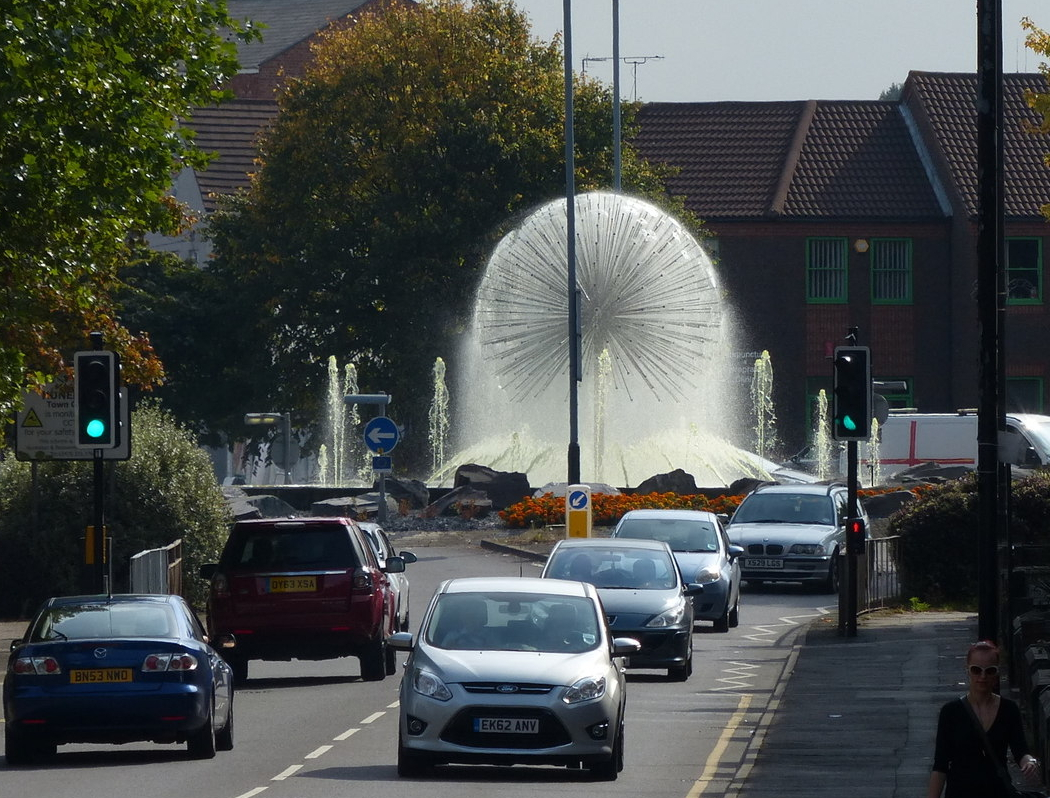
The Roanne Dandelion Fountain

== Places of interest ==
Places of interest in Nuneaton include:

- Abbey Theatre
- Arbury Hall
- Coventry Canal
- Nuneaton Museum and Art Gallery
- Riversley Park
- Whittleford Park

Places of interest near Nuneaton:

- Bosworth Battlefield Heritage Centre
- Battlefield Line Railway - Heritage railway
- Hartshill Hayes Country Park

== Education ==
=== Primary ===
- Abbey CE Infant School, Abbey Green
- All Saints' CE Primary School, Hill Top
- Camp Hill Primary School, Camp Hill
- Chetwynd Junior School, Whitestone
- Chilvers Coton Community Infant School, Chilvers Coton
- Croft Junior School, Stockingford
- Galley Common Infant School, Galley Common
- Glendale Infant School, Heath End
- Lower Farm Academy, Weddington
- Michael Drayton Junior School, Hartshill
- Middlemarch Junior School, Hill Top
- Milby Primary School, St Nicolas Park
- Milverton House School, Attleborough
- Nathaniel Newton Infant School, Hartshill
- Nursery Hill Primary School, Ansley Common
- Oak Wood Primary School (special school), Hill Top
- Our Lady & St Joseph Catholic Academy, Attleborough
- Park Lane Primary School, Grove Farm
- Queen's CE Junior School, Chilvers Coton
- St Anne's Catholic Primary School, Camp Hill
- St Nicolas' CE Primary School, St Nicolas Park
- St Paul's CE Primary School, Stockingford
- Stockingford Primary Academy, Stockingford
- Weddington Primary School, Weddington
- Wembrook Primary School, Attleborough
- Whitestone Infant School, Whitestone

=== Secondary ===
- Etone College, Horeston Grange
- George Eliot Academy, Hill Top
- Hartshill Academy Hartshill
- Higham Lane School, Weddington
- Nuneaton Academy, resulting from the merger of Alderman Smith School and Manor Park School), Stockingford
- Oak Wood Secondary School (special school), Hill Top
- St Thomas More Catholic School, Heath End

=== Further education ===
- King Edward VI College, Attleborough
- North Warwickshire and Hinckley College, St Nicolas Park
- St Thomas More R.C. Sixth Form College, Heath End
- Etone Sixth Form College, Horeston Grange
- Higham Lane Sixth Form College, Weddington

== Notable people ==
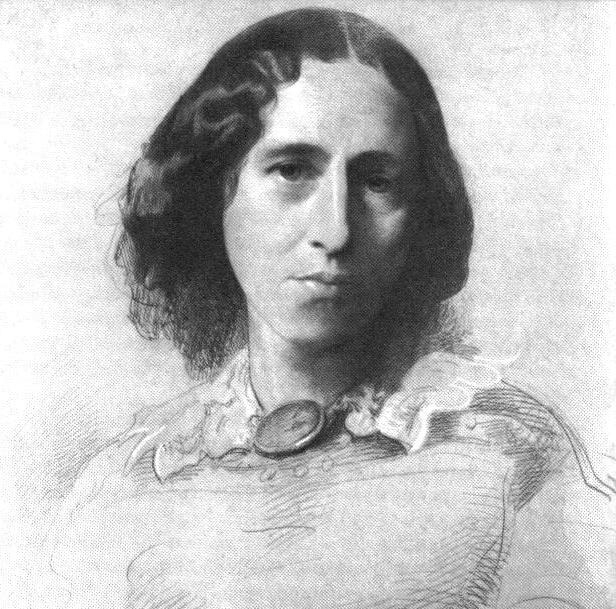
George Eliot, born in Nuneaton

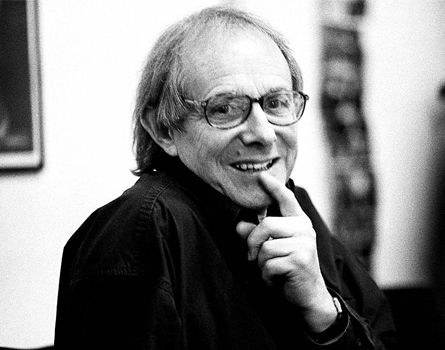
Ken Loach, film director

=== Literature ===
- George Eliot (1819–1880), Victorian novelist
- Caroline Graham (1931), English playwright, screenwriter, novelist
- A. J. Quinnell (1940–2005), English thriller novelist

=== Science and technology ===
- John Barber (1734–1793), inventor of the gas turbine in 1791
- John Birch (1867–1945), motorcycle manufacturer and designer
- Richard K. Guy (1916–2020), British mathematician and author
- Henry Beighton (1687–1743), Engineer, cartographer and engraver.
- Philip Randle (1926–2006), Biochemist

=== Media and the arts ===
- Paul Bradley, (born 1955) actor (born in Nuneaton)
- Ben Daniels, (born 1964) actor (born in Nuneaton)
- Carol Decker (born 1957), lead singer of pop group T'Pau
- Gareth Edwards, (born 1975) film director, Monsters, Godzilla and the 2016 Star Wars standalone film, Rogue One.
- Chris Emmett, (born 1938) comedian, notably appearing on 3-2-1
- Eyeless In Gaza, post-punk duo, formed 1980
- Fresh Maggots, early 1970s folk/psychedelic rock group
- Larry Grayson, (1923–1995) comedian, entertainer and television presenter, long-term resident of Nuneaton.
- Alan and Graham "Kidder" Hammonds, musicians, Incredible Kidda Band (grew up in Nuneaton and went to Alderman Smith and Manor Park Grammar School respectively)
- Jon Holmes, (born 1969) writer, comedian and broadcaster (grew up in Nuneaton)
- Conrad Keely, (born 1972) musician, born in Nuneaton
- Ken Loach, (born 1936) film and television director
- Kate Quilton (born 1983) TV presenter (Food Unwrapped – Channel 4)
- Justin Welch, (born 1972) drummer with Britpop band Elastica (1991–2001) and a drummer for Suede in their formative years
- Mary Whitehouse, (1910–2001) TV campaigner (born in Nuneaton)

=== Sports ===
- Ben Ackland, (born 1989) Irish cricketer (born in Nuneaton)
- Julian Alsop, (born 1973) footballer
- Stuart Attwell, (born 1982) Premier League referee
- Laura Bassett, (born 1983) Member of the 2015 WWC Bronze medal-winning England Women's National Football team
- Paul Best, (born 1991) retired cricketer
- John Curtis, (born 1978) footballer
- Matty Fryatt, (born 1986) footballer
- Andy Goode, (born 1980) Wasps RFC & England International Rugby Union Player
- Wally Holmes, (1925–2009) England international rugby union player
- Trevor Peake, (born 1957) footballer, 1987 FA Cup winner with Coventry City (born in Nuneaton)
- Mick Price, (born 1966) snooker player
- George Reader, (1896–1978) football referee; officiated in the final game of the 1950 FIFA World Cup
- Dean Richards, (born 1963) former England Rugby Union player and Rugby Union Coach (born in Nuneaton)
- Nicki Shaw, (born 1981) a former member of the England Women's Cricket team (born in Nuneaton)
- Andy Sullivan, (born 1987) golfer
- Ray Train, (born 1951) footballer
- Adam Whitehead, (born 1980) Olympic swimmer
- Peter Whittingham, (1984–2020) footballer (born in Whitestone, Nuneaton)
- Nigel Winterburn, (born 1963) retired footballer
- Jake Dennis, (born 1995) racing driver, 2022–23 Formula E world champion
- Jacob Blyth, (born 1992) football forward for Gateshead (born in Nuneaton)
- John Anderson (1931–2024), BBC Gladiators referee from 1992 to 2000

=== Other ===
- Andrew Copson, (born 1980) Chief Executive of Humanists UK.
- Ian Corder, (born 1960) UK Military Representative to NATO and Lieutenant Governor of Guernsey.
- William Dorsey (1813–1878), doctor and Australian pioneer
- George Finch (born 2006) Warwickshire County Council Leader from July 2025 to current, the youngest ever leader of a Council.
- Richard Freeman, (born 1970) cryptozoologist (born in Nuneaton)
- William Gadsby, (1773–1844) an English Baptist pastor born in Attleborough who wrote many hymns.
- Jeffrey Green, (born 1944) historian
- Edward Melly, (1857-1941) philanthropist, public servant and businessman
- Cecil Leonard Knox, (1889−1943) soldier, recipient of the Victoria Cross (born in Nuneaton)

== Media ==
Local radio stations include BBC CWR, Fosse 107 (formerly Oak 107),Hits Radio Coventry & Warwickshire (formally known as Mercia Sound, Mercia FM, Mercia and Free Radio Coventry & Warwickshire), and BBC Radio Leicester.

The main local newspapers are The Nuneaton Telegraph, a localised sub-edition of the Coventry Telegraph, which was launched in 1992 (when the Tribune switched from daily to weekly production); and the Nuneaton News (originally known as the Evening News upon launch and then the Heartland Evening News): Owned by Reach plc, which is a paid-for weekly newspaper, published every Wednesday.

The Nuneaton area is covered on regional TV News by BBC Midlands Today and ITV News Central

== Twin towns ==
The borough of Nuneaton and Bedworth is twinned with the following towns:

- Roanne, Loire, Auvergne-Rhône-Alpes, France
- Guadalajara, Guadalajara, Castilla-La Mancha, Spain
- Cottbus, Brandenburg, Germany
