= Galley Common =

Village in Warwickshire, England

Coordinates: 52.525044°N 1.532512°W

- Location within Warwickshire
- Population: 8,233 (2011)
- OS grid reference: SP319919
- District: Nuneaton and Bedworth
- Shire county: Warwickshire
- Region: West Midlands
- Country: England
- Sovereign state: United Kingdom
- Post town: NUNEATON
- Postcode district: CV10
- Dialling code: 024
- Police: Warwickshire
- Fire: Warwickshire
- Ambulance: West Midlands
- UK Parliament: Nuneaton
- Website: http://www.galleycommon.com

Galley Common is a suburban village on the outskirts of Nuneaton, Warwickshire, England. The community is a ward on the western fringe of the Nuneaton and Bedworth district, on the border with North Warwickshire district, with a population taken at the 2011 census of 8,233.

The village comprises a school, several small shops, riding stables, a social club, a small industrial estate and farmland. It is close to the villages of Ansley, Astley, Arley, Old Arley and Hartshill. It was previously a coal mining village separate to Nuneaton, and is still occasionally referred to as a village distinct from the town. The main social areas of the village are The Stute, St Peter's Church and the primary school.

== School ==
The Galley Common Infant School is situated on the outskirts of the village at the top of the hill and are surrounded by trees and fields. The school accommodates children aged from 4 to 7. There are five classes: two Reception classes, one straight Year 1 class; a mixed Year 1 and 2 class and a straight Year 2 class. There is a riding school for the disabled in Galley Common Village.

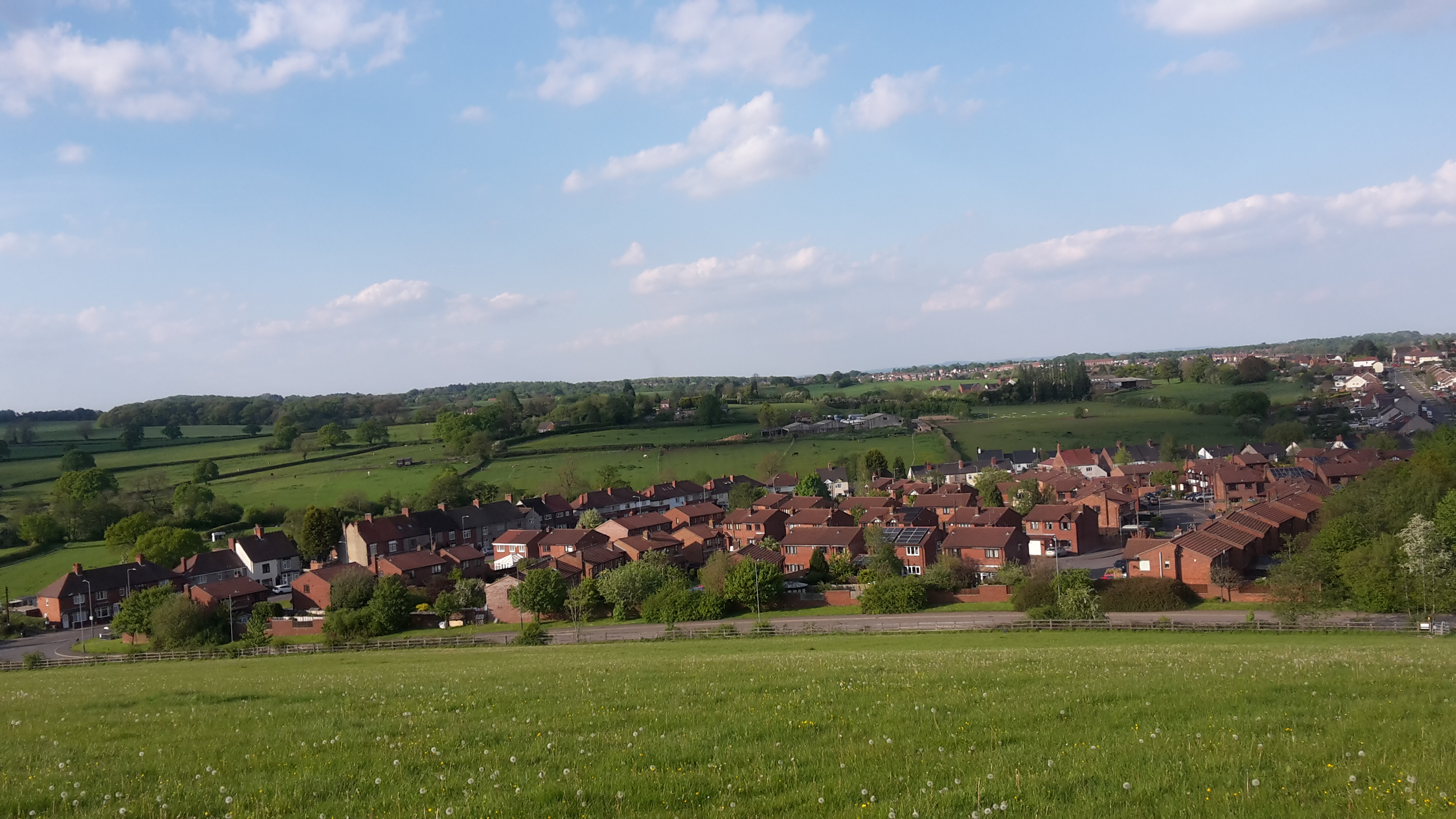
Galley Common

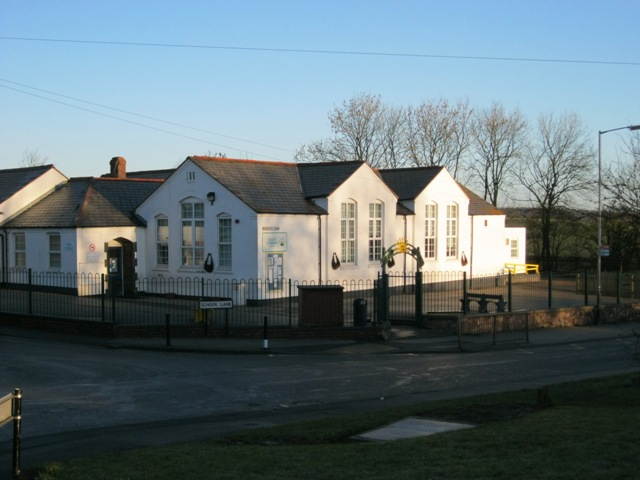
Galley Common Infant School
