= Abbeygate Shopping Centre =

Shopping centre in Nuneaton, England

Coordinates: 52.523787°N 1.467915°W

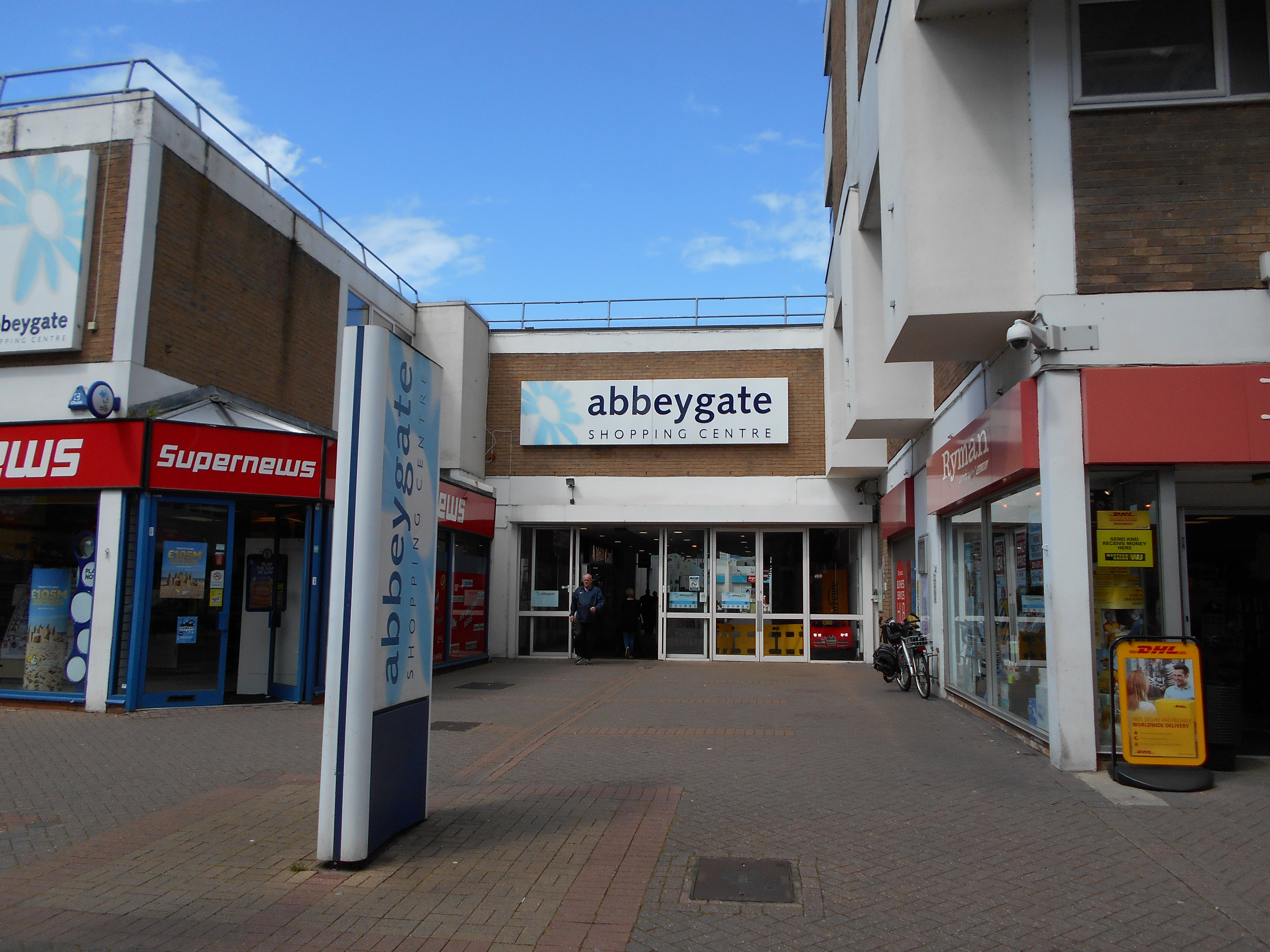
Entrance from Abbey Street

The Abbeygate Shopping Centre (sometimes mistakenly referred to as 'Abbey Gate Shopping Precinct') is a shopping centre in the town centre of Nuneaton, Warwickshire, England. It was first opened in the 1960s and was originally known as Heron Way, and was once home to an indoor market. During a refurbishment in the 1990s a glass atrium roof was fitted and it was renamed Abbeygate. It now comprises 40 retail units. The centre has a retail mix of multi-nationals and small independents.

The anchor stores were Argos and Peacocks. In 2020, Peacocks permanently closed down in the shopping centre, however it has since reopened once again in 2021 after a buyer was found. The reason for Argos' closure was due to Sainsbury's closing their standalone high-street stores as part of a "reorganisation". Argos still operate as a 'click and collect' branch inside the Vicarage Street Sainsbury's supermarket.

In October 2010 the main post office for the town relocated from the outside of the centre to an internal shop.

The centre is privately owned. In April 2018 it was sold to a mystery local property company for £4.3 million; considerably less than the £17 million the previous owners had paid for it in 2005.

from 14 January 2021, the former BrightHouse store, located inside of the Abbeygate Shopping Centre, was used as a vaccination centre during the coronavirus pandemic.
