= Whitestone, Warwickshire =

Area of Nuneaton, Warwickshire, England

Coordinates: 52.50566°N 1.43528°W

Whitestone
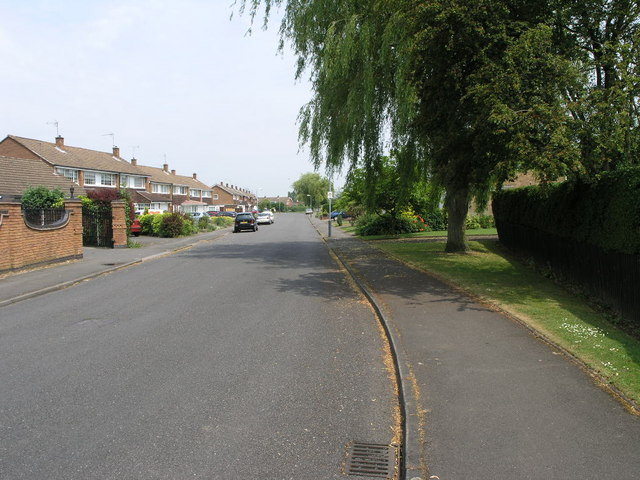
- Willow Shade

- Location within Warwickshire
- Population: 6,877 (2011 census)
- OS grid reference: SP384899
- District: Nuneaton and Bedworth
- Shire county: Warwickshire
- Region: West Midlands
- Country: England
- Sovereign state: United Kingdom
- Post town: NUNEATON
- Postcode district: CV11 (sectors 4 and 6)
- Dialling code: 024
- Police: Warwickshire
- Fire: Warwickshire
- Ambulance: West Midlands
- UK Parliament: Nuneaton

Whitestone is an area of Nuneaton in Warwickshire, England, approximately two miles south-east of Nuneaton town centre. It is also the name of a ward within the Borough of Nuneaton and Bedworth. The 2011 census gives the population of the ward as 6,877.
