= St Nicolas Church, Nuneaton =

Church in Nuneaton, Warwickshire, England

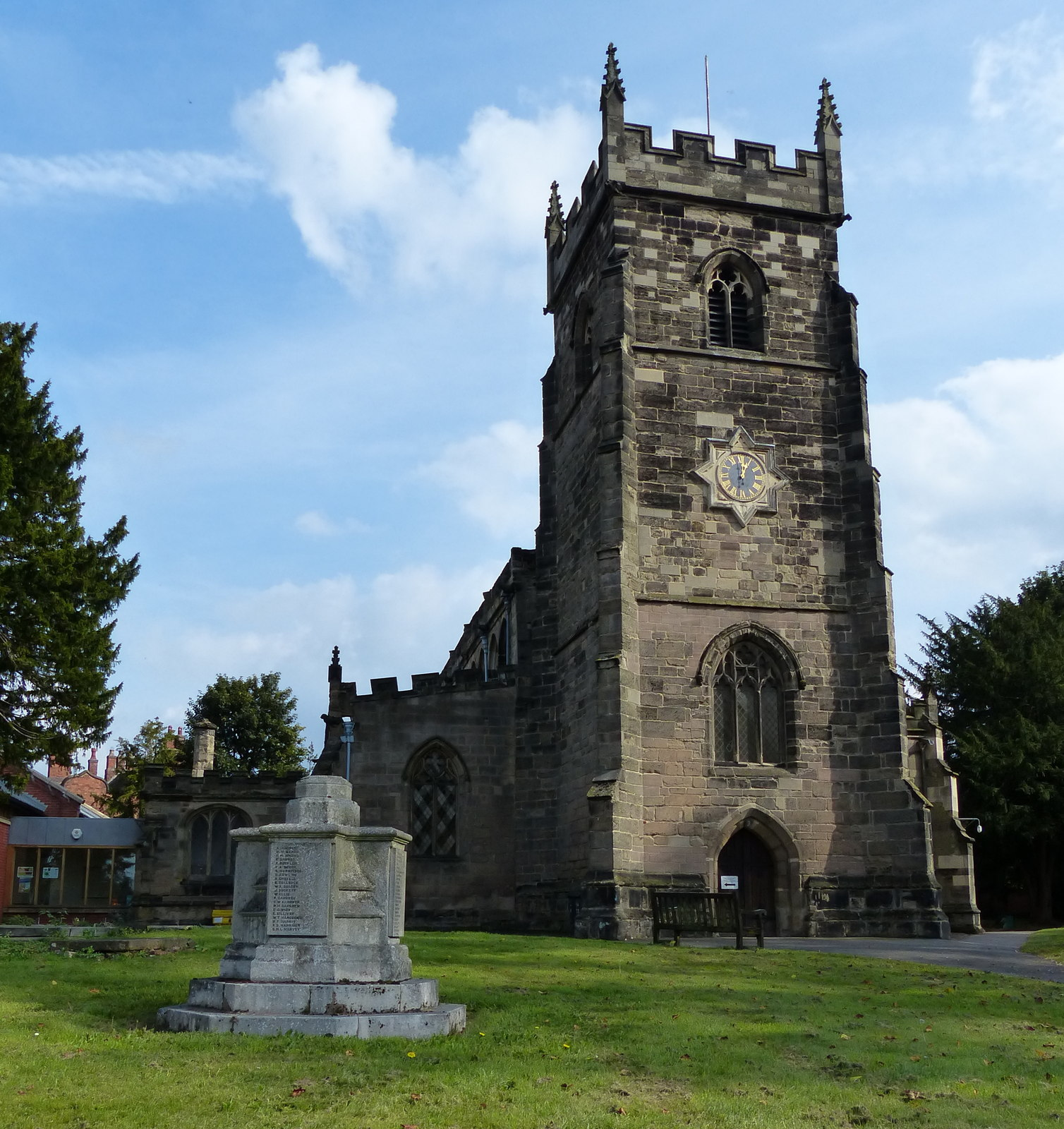
- Interactive map of St Nicolas Church, Nuneaton
- 52.5215°N 1.4627°W
- Location: Vicarage Street, Nuneaton, Warwickshire, England

Listed Building – Grade I
- Official name: Church of St Nicolas
- Designated: 6 December 1947
- Reference no.: 1299514

St Nicolas Church is the parish church of Nuneaton, Warwickshire, England owned by the Church of England. The building dates back to around 1340 and is a Grade I listed building.

== History ==
The church dates back to around 1340, but there may have been a Saxon church on the same site previously. The church's sign indicates it being there since 1155, possibly referencing the previously mentioned Saxon church. In the 15th century the roofs were replaced and the tower added. The roof has large beams, roof bosses and the emblem of the Five Wounds of Christ.

A Victorian restoration, including the extension of the chancel, was carried out in the 1850s by Ewan Christian. This included the installation of pews and the removal of the galleries. An organ was installed in 1813.

The church was used by George Eliot in Scenes of Clerical Life where it was named Milby Church.

The parish and benefice are within the Diocese of Coventry.

== Architecture ==
The sandstone building has tiled roofs. It consists of an aisled nave, three-bay chancel with chapels, a vestry to the north and a west tower. The three-stage tower is supported by diagonal buttresses. The tower contains a ring of eight bells. The oldest of these were cast in 1703 by Rudhall of Gloucester. One of the chapels is named in memory of John Leeke who gave money to the church around 1500. The other was named for St Katherine but now holds the organ.

One stained glass window, which was installed in 1923 in the Leeke Chapel remains, all the other stained glass was destroyed by bombing in 1941 during World War II. There are several memorials including one to Marmaduke Constable who was the Lord of the manor and died in 1560.
