= Nuneaton Priory =

Architectural structure in Nuneaton and Bedworth, Warwickshire, England

Coordinates: 52.525566°N 1.477010°W

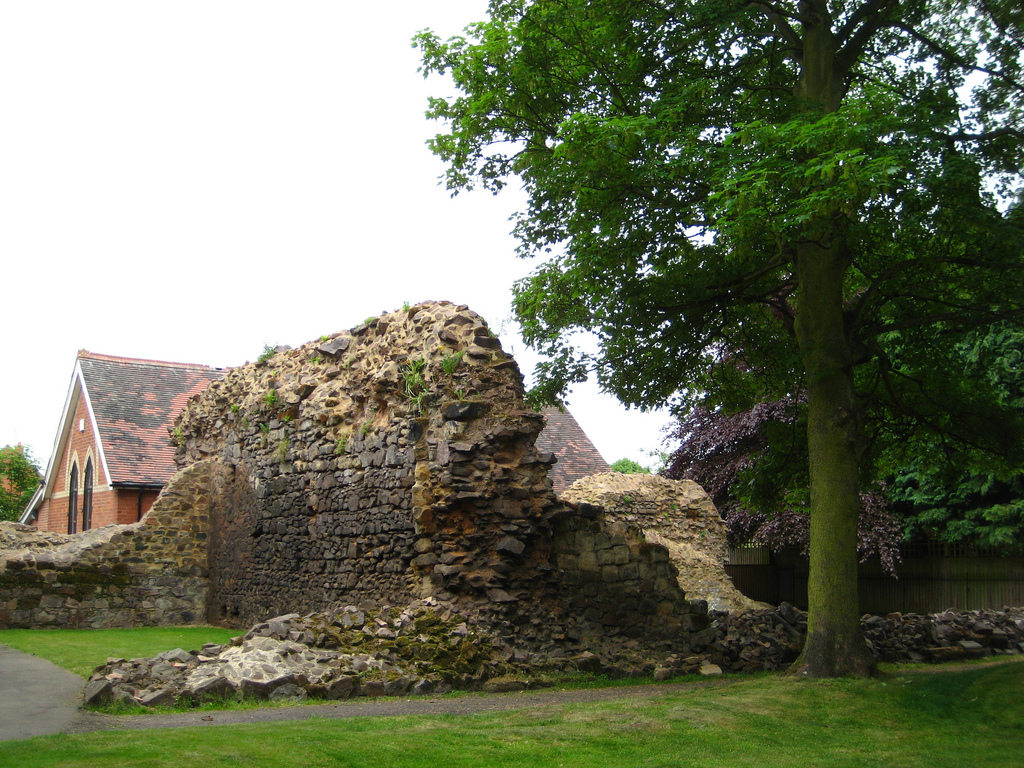
Ruins of Nuneaton Priory

Nuneaton Priory was a medieval Benedictine monastic house in Nuneaton, Warwickshire, England. It was founded as a daughter house of the Order of Fontevraud in 1153.

The priory was initially founded by Robert de Beaumont and Gervase Paganell in 1153 at Kintbury in Berkshire as a daughter house of Fontevraud Abbey in France. Soon afterwards, in around 1155 the foundation was moved to Etone (or Eaton) in Warwickshire, which subsequently became known as Nuneaton.

Nuneaton Priory must have become "denizen", that is, a naturalised English monastery, around the time of the suppression of the alien priories, since there was a prior of Nuneaton still in 1424 and other mentions are then found.

At various moments, the women's house at Nuneaton was large, containing 93 nuns in 1234 and 89 in 1328, but the Black Death will have taken its toll, and later the house numbered 46 nuns in 1370, about 40 in 1459, only 23 in 1507 and at the end, in 1539, 27 in total, of whom 25 were granted pensions. The 1535 Valor Ecclesiasticus, Henry VIII's pre-seizure survey, showed a net annual income for the priory of some 253 pounds.

The seal of Nuneaton Priory depicted the Virgin Mary in the pose of the Seat of Wisdom (Sedes sapientiae), which was a common motif for seals of nunneries in medieval England, though not the majority choice. The motif entails a depiction of the Blessed Virgin seated and facing forward, presenting or holding the Christ Child on her lap.

The nunnery was seized in 1539 during King Henry VIII's Dissolution of the Monasteries, and subsequently fell into ruin.

== Restoration ==
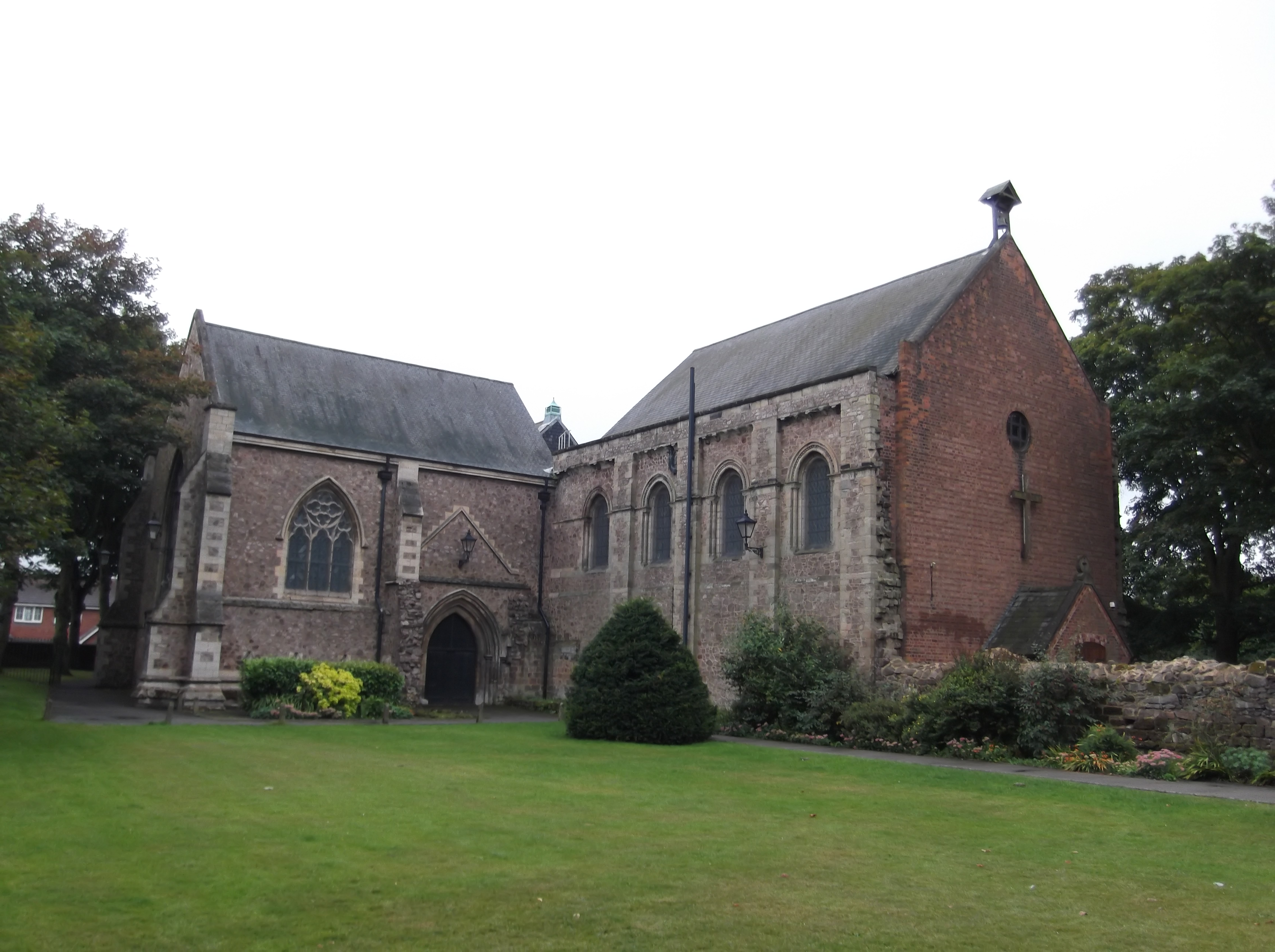
The restored Parish Church of St Mary The Virgin, incorporating a medieval wall and windows

By the 19th century, all that remained of the original church were portions of the 12th- and 13th-century piers of the tower, the south wall of the south transept, and the foundations of the north transept and nave.

The Church has been partially restored. The nave was rebuilt in 1876 on the old foundations by the Gothic Revival architect C.C. Rolfe. The chancel was rebuilt in 1906, and then the north transept in 1931 by Harold Brakspear.

The church (such as it stands) is used as the Parish Church of St. Mary The Virgin and is known locally as the Abbey Church. The recent tradition of the church is Anglo-Catholic.

Despite this building's significance in Nuneaton's past and its recent history, it is a relatively unknown place, with little promotion or signage.
