= Etone College =

Academy school in Nuneaton, Warwickshire, England

Location
- Leicester Road; Nuneaton, Warwickshire, CV11 6AA; England; 52°31′34″N 1°27′29″W

Information
- Type: Academy
- Local authority: Warwickshire
- Trust: Matrix Academy Trust
- Specialists: Applied Learning, Language and Technology
- Department for Education URN: 137771 Tables
- Ofsted: Reports
- Headteacher: Ian Smith
- Gender: Coeducational
- Age: 11 to 18
- Enrolment: 902
- Houses: Phoenix, Centaur, Dragon, Griffin
- Colours: yellow, red, blue, purple
- Website: www.etonecollege.co.uk

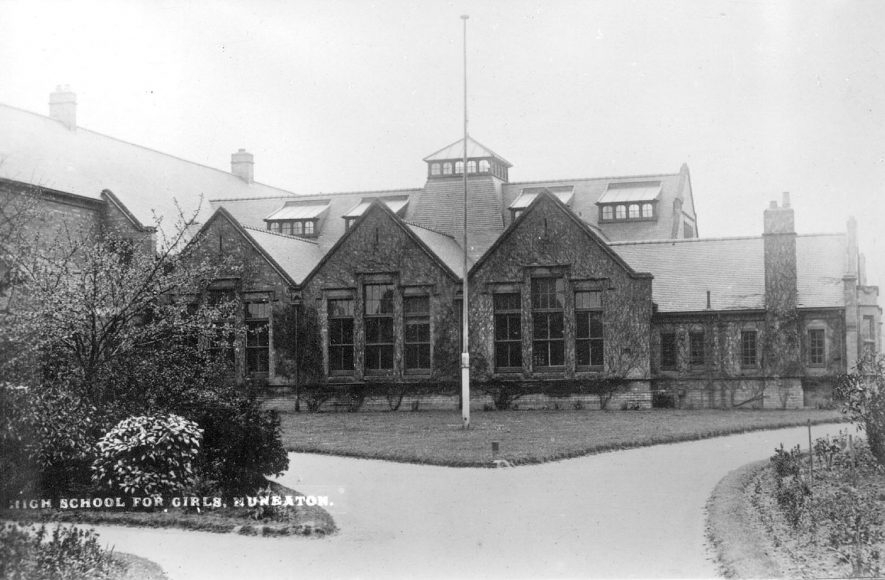
Nuneaton School for Girls in about 1915

Etone College (formerly Etone Community School and Technology College) is a secondary academy school in Nuneaton, Warwickshire, England. It was founded in 1910 as the Nuneaton High School for Girls, and is now a mixed school.

== History ==
Nuneaton High School for Girls was founded in 1910 with the strong support of the Director of Education Bolton King. The founding head was (later Dame) Emmeline Mary Tanner who would go on to shape the Education Act 1944.

The school was the grammar school for girls passing the eleven plus exam. However, after the abolition of the tripartite system, the school became mixed sex and changed its name to 'Etone Community School'. In 2002, the school was granted Technology College status under the specialist schools programme. In 2006, the school established a loose federation with another local school, Hartshill School to share resources and expertise. It also gained specialist Language and Vocational College status in 2006 and 2007 respectively. On 1 January 2012 the school officially gained academy status

In March 2015 the school came out 15 months of "special measures" after achieving a rating of "good" by Ofsted, and now is seen as one of the best schools in the Nuneaton and Warwickshire area.

In 2023 the school was nominated for the TES Wellbeing School of the Year with Mr Smith being nominated for Headteacher of the Year at the TES School Awards.

In 2025 the school won the Education Business Award for Community School of the Year, in recognition of raising over £20,000 across four years. The award was presented by Kate Bellingham from the BBC's Tomorrow's World.

SuperKind Org presented the school with the awards for Secondary School of the Year and West Midland School of the Year in July 2025.

Etone College has four houses and they have different tie colours. Griffin house have a gold tie, Phoenix house have a red tie, Dragon house have a purple tie and Centaur house have a blue tie.

== Radio 1 ==
In early 2007, the school was paid a visit by Radio 1, as part of its Star Pupil feature. Presenter Edith Bowman broadcast live from the school and introduced pop singers Paolo Nutini and Jamelia performing live in the school's main hall.

In 2025, the school was again visited by BBC Coventry Warwickshire Radio, as part of its Star School feature. This was in recognition of their awards for community engagement.

== Notable former pupils ==
=== Nuneaton High School for Girls ===
- Dame Janet Gaymer, Commissioner for Public Appointments for England, Wales and Northern ireland from 2006–10
- Caroline Graham, playwright, whose 1988 Inspector Barnaby books became ITV's Midsomer Murders in 1997
- Prof Rebecca Posner, Professor of the Romance Languages from 1978-96 at the University of Oxford (St Hugh's College), President from 1996-2000 of the Philological Society
