= Wally Holmes (rugby union) =

English rugby union player

Wally Holmes (1925 – 2009) was an English rugby union player, who represented England, and also played for the Barbarians.

Born Walter Alan Holmes on 10 September 1925 in Nuneaton, Warwickshire, he attended the town's Vicorage Street School and Higham Lane School, before working as a Bevin Boy during World War II. He would later work as an engineer for Morris Motors and Massey Ferguson. He joined Nuneaton R.F.C. (known locally as the Nuns) in 1944, and enjoyed a twenty-five year playing career with them. In 1950 he was called up to play for England, and represented them in fifteen international matches. He also played eight matches with the Barbarians, and during his career was capped sixteen times.

At the time of his death on 6 April 2009, his grandson Gary was the first team captain of Nuneaton R.F.C.

In 2010 the Coventry Telegraph reported that an England shirt worn by Holmes during his international rugby career was discovered to be for sale at a shop in Neutral Bay, Sydney, Australia for $AS5,000 (roughly £3,000).
