= Higham Lane School =

Location
- Shanklin Drive; Nuneaton, Warwickshire, CV10 0BJ; England; 52°31′58″N 1°27′24″W

Information
- Type: Academy
- Motto: "Work Hard, Be Kind, Take Responsibility"
- Established: 1939
- Local authority: Warwickshire County Council
- Department for Education URN: 137767 Tables
- Ofsted: Reports
- Head teacher: Michael Gannon
- Head of Sixth Form: Thomas Sears
- Gender: Co-educational
- Age: 11 to 18
- Enrolment: 1,470
- Classes offered: English Language, English Literature, Maths, Religion and World Views, Physical Education (PE), Science (Biology, Chemistry, Physics), French, Geography, History, Business, Business and Enterprise (Vocational), Computer Science, Drama, Engineering Design (Vocational), Fine Art, Food Preparation and Nutrition, Health and Social Care (Vocational), IT (Vocational), Music, Sport Science (Vocational), Photography, Sociology,
- Hours in school day: 6.5
- Houses: Honestas (honesty, integrity, kindness, compassion and empathy) Luctamen (hard work, effort, growth mindset, resilience, determination) Spiritus (inspiration, innovation, originality, creativity)
- Colours: Black and red
- Website: Official website

Higham Lane School is a secondary academy school in Weddington, Nuneaton, England. The school teaches students aged between eleven and eighteen, (Key Stage 3, Key Stage 4 and Key Stage 5) in preparation for their GCSEs and A-levels.

The original school building dates back to 1939, with the introduction of new laboratories, a sports hall and a new Business and Enterprise Centre arriving since. In 2003, after a successful bid, the school was granted Business and Enterprise College status, under the specialist schools programme. In January 2012, the school officially gained Academy status. In November 2021, the school and sixth form were awarded the World Class Schools WCSQM quality mark.

Appointed in 2023, the school's headteacher is Michael Gannon, taking over from Phil Kelly who had been headteacher of the school for 16 years and retired at the end of August 2022. Michael Gannon is the current head of the school with Thomas Sears as the Assistant Head and Head of the Sixth Form.

== History ==
In 2003, Higham Lane became a Business and Enterprise specialist school, under the specialist schools programme. As part of the programme, the school received an additional £500,000 in funding as well as a capital grant of £100,000 in order to fund the construction of a "Business and Enterprise Centre".

On 13 June 2017 the school made national news when a 15-year-old boy took a double-barrelled shotgun and 200 cartridges into the school with the intent of endangering life.

In 2022, Higham Lane merged with Central England Academy Trust, the Multi-Academy-Trust running the Oakwood Primary and Secondary Generic Special Schools. In 2025, Higham Lane's new 'sister-school', Higham Lane North Academy, opened to Year 7 on the new Milby Meadows development to the North of the existing school site.

On January 5th of 2026, Higham Lane was forced to close to both students and staff following a Cyber attack over the winter holidays. Students were forced to learn from home while the network was made stable after the attack affected the fire alarm systems, phone lines, door controls and much more. After two weeks, the school reopened but the school were not running at 100% with effects still being seen during the half term.

== School Farm ==
In the 1970s and 80s, the school became well known for the smallholding established by former teacher, John Terry, which he went on to write about in several books (Pigs in the Playground, Calves in the Classroom, Ducks in Detention & Rabbits on Report – published by Farming Press Books). Queen Elizabeth II visited Nuneaton for the first time in December 1994, and when visiting the school, she presented a calf to the school farm and opened the school's new science block. The school farm continued to operate until Terry's retirement in 1998.

== Sixth Form ==
In 2016, the school constructed a new £1.6 million sixth form building. The building has the potential to accommodate three hundred students. It contains seventeen teaching rooms in addition to two science labs, an art room and a common room.

== The building ==
The two main sections of the building are Coombe to the east, and Chine to the west (both of which take their names from types of geographical feature found on the Isle of Wight, continuing a theme found in the street names in the vicinity of the school). The school was originally three different schools, with no physical link between Coombe and Chine. Chine initially housed Higham Lane Infant School, whose assembly hall is now the library, and Higham Lane Junior School, whose assembly hall is now Chine Hall, while Coombe housed a secondary modern school Higham Lane High School. These three schools closed and were then combined to form one Comprehensive school, following a major re-organisation of schools in Warwickshire in the early 1970s.

Additions to these two core buildings include dedicated classrooms for subjects requiring special equipment, such as design and technology (in particular, resistant materials, graphic design and food technology, all of which are on the north side of Coombe), science (situated to the north-east of Coombe) and physical education (to the north-east and south-east of Coombe). Other major subjects, such as English, mathematics and history, are taught in classrooms in the main body of Coombe and Chine.

== Notable alumni ==
- Gareth Edwards – director of Monsters, Godzilla, and Rogue One
- George Finch – Leader of Warwickshire County Council
- Jon Holmes – BAFTA award-winning writer, comedian and broadcaster; writer of Horrible Histories
- Wally Holmes – rugby union player
- Lauren Samuels – West End actress; runner up on Over The Rainbow
