= Abbey Theatre, Nuneaton =

Theatre in Nuneaton, England

Abbey Theatre
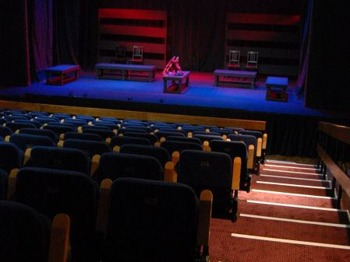
- Auditorium
- Interactive map of Abbey Theatre
- Address: Pool Bank Street; Nuneaton; England
- Coordinates: 52.52288°N 1.47513°W
- Owner: Nuneaton Arts CIO
- Capacity: 250 + wheelchair spaces
- Type: Receiving house
- Current use: Theatre

Construction
- Opened: 1974
- Renovated: 1969 to 1974

Website
- www.abbeytheatre.co.uk

The Abbey Theatre is situated on Pool Bank Street in the Abbey Ward of Nuneaton, England.

The venue hosts performances including visiting theatre companies, touring shows, musicals, pantomime and drama, dance, comedy and film screenings.

The Abbey Theatre is run by a charity, Nuneaton Arts CIO, Charity No 1193774. The charity Board of Trustees, with a maximum of 12 elected trustees (who serve a 3 year term from selection at AGM) and 2 ex-officio representatives from the local authority, Nuneaton & Bedworth Borough Council (NBBC).

With a regular annual attendance of over 30,000, the Abbey is the only public theatre in Nuneaton and one of the busiest venues in Warwickshire.

== History ==
The Nuneaton Arts Council was founded in 1969 by a group of local arts devotees who noted the continuing demise of other venues in Nuneaton. When the local Territorial Army drill hall became available, the new Arts Council began converting the building. The task was completed in 1974, and the first performance was from the Nuneaton Pantomime and Revue Society, with their production of Finian's Rainbow.

For several years in the 1980s the theatre was the town's only cinema following the closure of the last full time picture house, The Ritz. It continued semi-regular screenings until the new Odeon multi-screen complex opened in the nearby Bermuda Estate.

In 2003, the building closed with no notice after asbestos was identified in many parts of the venue, some of which had been disturbed during recent modification works to upgrade the facilities. The doors were closed for 6 months, but after agreement with the local authority (the building's landlord) a rescue package was agreed and the theatre re-opened in the early autumn.

On 22 January 2007, a performance of the Pied Piper of Hamelin went up half an hour late after contractors had inadvertently laid tarmac up to the emergency doors rendering them inoperable. Volunteers removed the new tarmac and the local authority had the contractors re-lay properly within days.

In 2008, The Masqueraders Theatrical society became the latest amateur group to move from the Bedworth Civic Hall to the Abbey Theatre, due to the costs of hiring the much larger Bedworth venue.

November 2008 saw an entire winter season at the Abbey nearly come to a halt because of the demolition of the old Co-op Hall, situated immediately behind the theatre, which was to become a Lidl supermarket. Last-minute talks narrowly avoided all shows in that month being cancelled.

In August 2012, the theatre got permission to install air conditioning in all public areas of the building.

In June 2014, the theatre took part in the UK Heritage Open Weekend and the public were invited to take a look around the theatre.

In March 2015, the theatre was the venue for what was thought to be the largest ghost hunters convention in the UK.

During March 2015 the venue was also used for a Beats project which was featured on BBC Radio One.

One of the biggest challenges to the Abbey, and to all UK theatres, was in 2020 when the coronavirus (COVID-19) pandemic prompted all UK venues to close on March 16. On July 5 the UK government announced a £1.57 billion rescue package of grants and loans for the arts industry.

2021 saw the change of charitable status, with Nuneaton Arts Council become Nuneaton Arts CIO (Charitable Incorporated Organisation). This move allows the charity more scope for funding applications and a new constitution was adopted.

== Content ==
The theatre hosts a variety of performances and events throughout 11 months of each year, with the venue traditionally closing the auditorium during August for maintenance and renovation projects.

The venue regularly hosts 5 or more amateur musical theatre shows, several dramatic works, the annual scout & guide gang show, dance school presentations, local school productions, and two pantomimes.

From the professional arena, the Abbey holds regular comedy nights from the Funhouse Comedy circuit and occasional main events from up and coming comedians such as Scott Bennett.

In the past years the stage has seen the likes of John Challis, Honor Blackman, Barry Cryer, Kiki Dee, Maddy Prior and others as part of their touring shows. Mot recently David Bradley gave an interesting insight (October 2026) on his decades in the business under the auspices of supporting local midlands health organisations - in partnership with the George Eliot Hospital Trust.

== Main User Groups ==
The Abbey Theatre has a number of regular user groups who produce on the stage and/or rehearse full time in the first floor spaces.

Abbey Players - December pantomime, June variety show and autumn play

Masqueraders Theatrical Society (MTS) - Two musicals per year.

MTS Juniors - Occasional musical or dramatic play once per year.

Nuneaton Amateur Operatic & Dramatic Society (NAODS) - Two musicals per year.

Nuneaton Gang Show (NGS) - Annual scout & guide variety show.

Rabble Youth Theatre - One musical each December for solely children's casting.

Sudden Impulse Theatre Company (SITC) - January pantomime and one or two dramatic works per year.

== Historical User Groups ==
Past amateur groups who have produced content for the town include the Milby Theatre Company (straight dramatic works) , Centre Theatre Company (Gilbert & Sullivan Operettas) and Nuneaton Hospital Pantomime (panto, obviously).

Nuneaton Pantomime and Revue Society (NPRS) moved to the Civic Hall in Bedworth and ended their tenure there when that venue was closed down.

PR Productions produced the first two-week pantomime at the Abbey between 2002 and 2017 after which they were dissolved. However following popular demand PR reformed for December 2024 at the Civic Hall taking their pantomime fare to the newly re-opened venue.

== Facilities ==
=== The main house ===
The main house seats 250 people, with space for four wheelchair users with a carer seat by the side of each. The stage is a little over 3 feet high from floor level. Seating is raked (stepped) to the back of the auditorium.

=== Bar ===
The bar has hosted smaller events such as comedy nights, small acoustic sessions, and meetings. In the bar area are chairs, sofas and various screens for showing advertising for forthcoming events.

=== Milby room ===
The Milby room can accommodate up to 60 people. It is used as a rehearsal space for various groups, for local chess club meetings every Monday evening, and by the local neighborhood watch team for local resident meetings.

=== Etone Lounge ===
This is the largest space outside of the main house and can be used to put on small productions, as this space can seat up to 100 people depending on the layout. This space is mainly used for rehearsals for the local groups as well as for meetings.

== The future ==
In February 2014 it was announced that the NAC was working in conjunction with Nuneaton and Bedworth Borough Council (NBBC) to design and build a new community arts complex within the town's ring road. Although this project has yet to be fully realised, in 2019 the NAC became associated with the Transforming Nuneaton Project (TNP).

However, despite the hopes for a new home, the collaboration with the TNP and local authorities did not realise the plans for the community arts and theatre hub.
