= Melly =

Melly, Mely or Mellie can refer to:

== Surname ==
- André Melly (1802–1851) cotton merchant and entomologist
- Andrée Melly (1932-2020), English actress
- Charles Pierre Melly (1829–1888), English philanthropist
- Edward Melly (1857-1941) English philanthropist and businessman
- Florence Melly (1856–1928) English educationist
- George Melly (1926–2007), English singer, critic, writer and lecturer
- George Melly (MP) (1830–1894), English merchant, shipowner and politician
- Julius Kibiwott Melly, elected to the National Assembly of Kenya in 2013

== Given name, nickname or stage name ==
- Melly (Brazilian singer), Brazilian singer and songwriter
- Mellie Francon (born 1982), Swiss snowboarder
- Melly Goeslaw, stage name of Indonesian singer and songwriter Mellyana Goeslaw Hoed (born 1974)
- Melly Herlina (born 1983), Indonesian singer
- Melly Lee, Indonesian singer, actress and presenter born Meli Nuryani in 2004
- Melisa Nicolau (born 1984), Spanish former footballer known as Mely or Melisa
- Melly Oitzl (born 1955), Austrian behavioral neuroscientist
- Mely Romero Celis (born 1977), Mexican politician
- Melly Still (born 1962), British director, designer and choreographer
- Mely G. Tan (1930–2024), Indonesian sociologist
- Mellie Uyldert (1908–2009), Dutch New Age writer, alternative healer, occultist and astrologer
- Meldon Mellie Wolfgang (1890-1947), American Major League Baseball pitcher
- YNW Melly (born 1999), American rapper

== Fictional characters ==
- Melanie Hamilton, called "Melly", in the film Gone with the Wind
- Melly Plinius, a survivor in the video game Identity V
- Roger Mellie, in Viz magazine
