= André Melly =

Swiss merchant and amateur entomologist

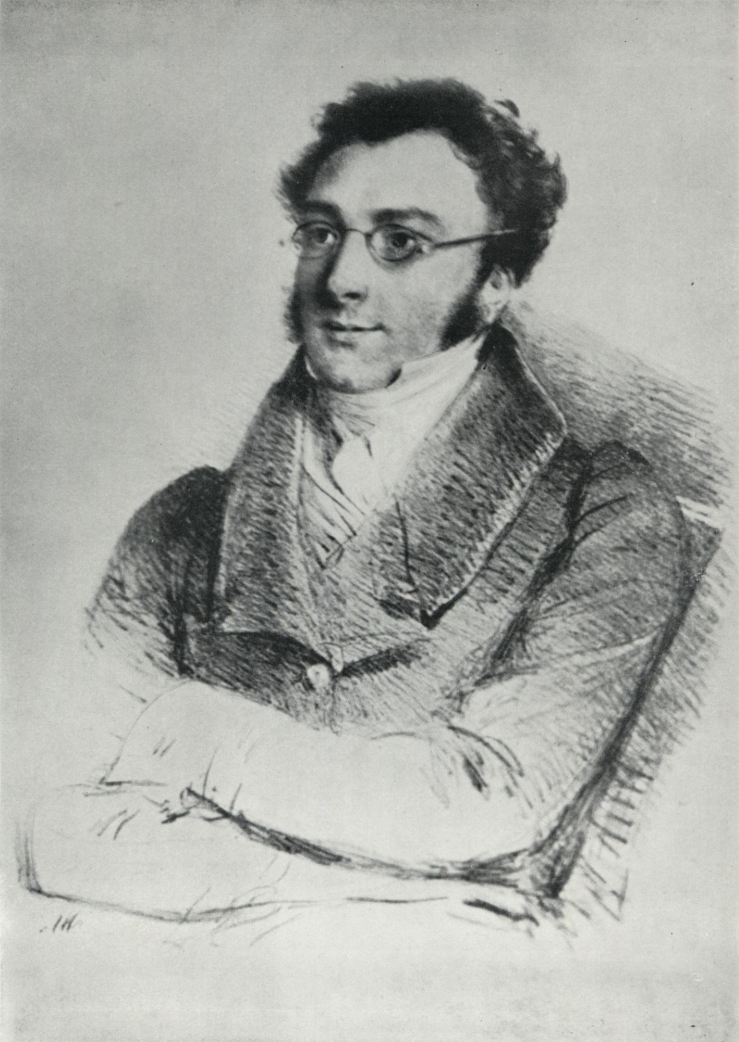
- Born: 12 May 1802; Geneva, Switzerland
- Died: 19 January 1851 (aged 48); Abu Hamad, Egypt
- Occupation: Trade merchant
- Spouse: Ellen Maria Greg
- Children: 3, including Charles and George
- Relatives: Florence Melly (granddaughter)

André Melly anglicized as Andrew Melly (12 May 1802 – 19 January 1851) was a cotton merchant of Swiss-origin who settled in England and was a keen amateur entomologist, naturalist and specimen collector. He died while on a family trip to Egypt at the edge of the Nubian desert. Many insects have been described from his collections and are named after him. His collection of nearly 35000 specimens are now in the Geneva Natural History Museum.

== Biography ==
Inscription on memorial tablet

Peregrino Rispetta la Tomba dello Straniero.
In Memory of G. [sic] MELLY, OF LIVERPOOL, ENGLAND.
Born at Geneva, 12th of May, 1802;
Died at Gagee, near this spot, 19th of January, 1851.
Returning from Khartoum, whither he was led by a love of science and
natural history, accompanied by his family,
consisting of his wife, two sons, and one daughter,
he was here attacked by fever,
and died in his tent after five days.

This tomb was erected over his grave in 1851, with unsolicited courtesy,
by Latif Pacha, then Governor of the Soudan; and
in November, 1859, this tablet was sent from Liverpool by Mr. Melly's family,
who are indebted to the kindness of Mr. John Petherick
for bringing and placing it here.

Melly was born in Geneva to Jean-Léonard Melly, a wealthy watchmaker, and Antoinette-Marguerite, née Joly. He traced his ancestry to a Jean Colombe whose son Matthieu changed his name to "Mesley ou Melly" in the 16th century. Family legends held that he was a descendant of Christopher Columbus. The family shield had a dove in a sky above a ship sailing towards the setting sun with the motto "a good name is better than a golden girdle."

Melly became interested in natural history at a young age following interactions with Louis Jurine and began to collect in the Swiss Alps. He went to learn trade in Livorno. During these years, he was influenced by the ideas of Voltaire and some of his remarks overheard at a cafe table led to the Government of the Kingdom of Naples placing a secret watch over him.

He later worked as a clerk in 1819-22 for Viollier, Grabau and Co. of Genoa which traded in cotton from Egypt. He then emigrated to England and founded Melly, Romilly and Co. merchants at Liverpool and married Ellen Maria Greg (1807-1894), daughter of his business partner Samuel Greg, cotton-merchant. John James Audubon knew the Rathbone family into which one of Greg's other daughters was married. When Audubon visited England in 1826, he dined with Melly on several occasions, and examined his insect collections, recorded as 13000 species in Audubon's diary. Audubon was provided introductions by Melly who in turn was introduced to John Bachman to whom a set of specimens was sent, which may have been lost in transit.

Melly was careful with his finances and thanks to his friends, he was able to manage even in the rough economic period of 1825-6. Melly became a naturalised British citizen in 1827 through a private Act of Parliament. He took an interest in several learned societies and was a member of the statistical societies both at Manchester and Liverpool.

His cotton business was mainly involved in imports from Egypt and was the sole English agent for Pasha Mahomet Ali. A year after the Pasha's death, in 1850 he made a trip to Egypt along with his wife, two sons and daughter with the aim also of collecting beetle and bird specimens in the region. Melly had always been politically minded and spoke in public on reforms, and supported liberal measures. He however observed slave trade in the region but did not comment on it. They visited Nicola Ulivi, an Italian naturalist and slave-trader and examined his collections. The family was together at Khartoum for Christmas. He then went out on his own for collections with a 10 day ride on camel-back. On his way back, he suffered from fever on 1 January 1851 at the edge of the desert of Korosko in Abu Hamad and some days later (some sources give the date as 15 January, but the date on the memorial tablet made by the family is 19 January) and was buried in the village of Gagee (or Geiga / Gazee). His son George wrote a two volume description of the Egypt-Sudan tour and some of the collections made on the trip are now in the Liverpool museum.

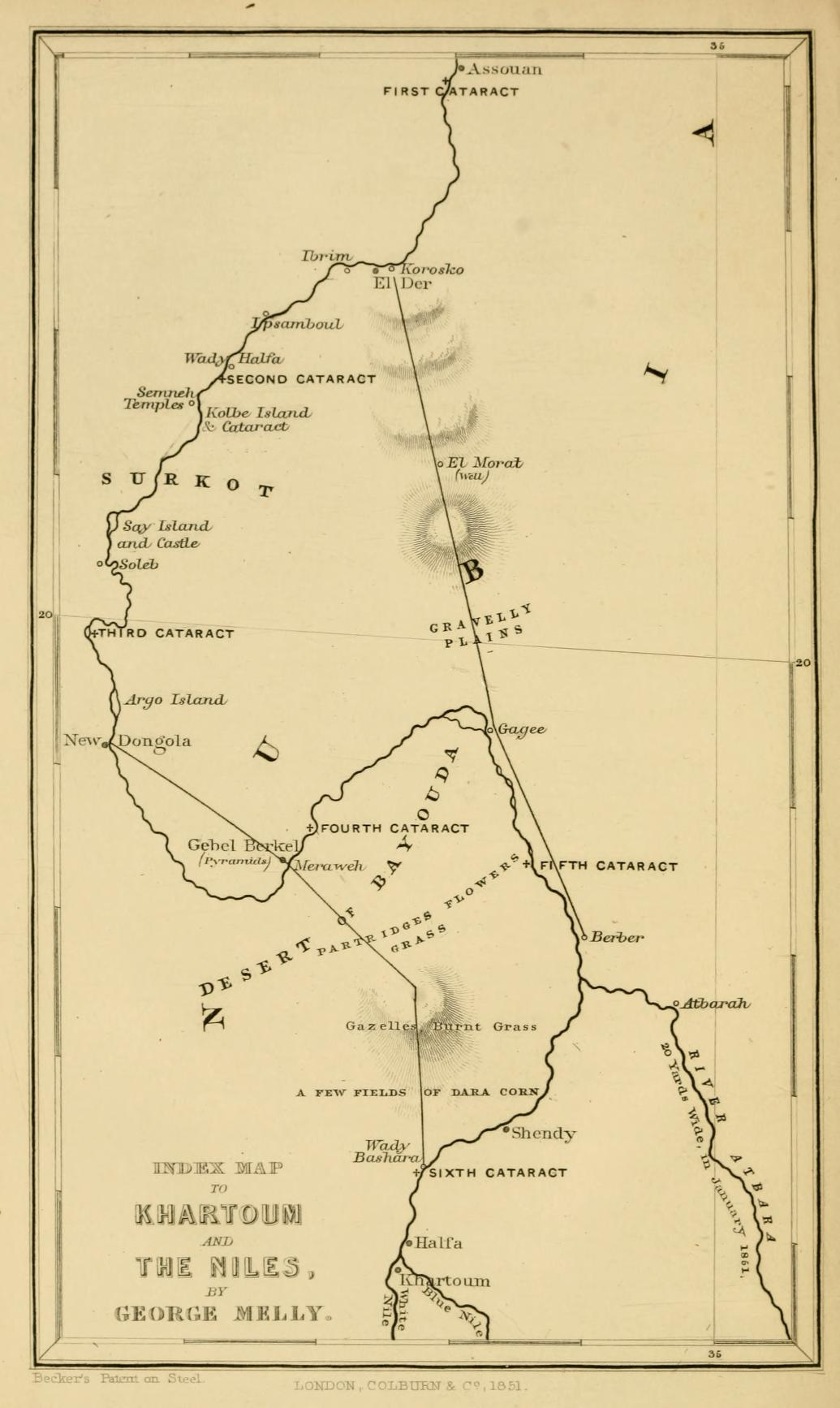
Map of the region of Melly's last travel

A memorial tablet from the family was transported later from Liverpool by John Petherick and placed at his burial site in Sudan atop an older foundation built by 'Abd al-Latif Pasha but this was destroyed during the Mahdist period.

Melly left two sons, Charles Pierre Melly, and George, who was a Liberal MP in the House of Commons for Stoke-upon-Trent. Their descendants include jazz singer George Melly and his actress sister Andrée Melly.

== Insect collections ==
Some of Melly's early collections of beetles were gifted to the Geneva Natural History Museum prior to his move to Italy. After his death, the duplicates were offered to the Geneva Museum and later the entire collection was sold off by his widow. The curator Alois Humbert made visits to England in 1857 and 1861 to transfer these. In 1843 he had made a very large collection of insects from Italy on a holiday with his family. He also purchased specimens and in 1847 his collection had been estimated to contain over 22,000 species from around the world. He owned a large collection of Cetoniinae, including the type specimens of Hippolyte Louis Gory. The only species he personally described was Passalus goryi (now Proculus goryi) in 1833. He was known to generously loan out specimens to entomologists across Europe and offered many travelling entomologists hospitality at Liverpool. Visitors included Hermann Burmeister and Étienne Mulsant. The beetle Platyrhopalopsis melleii was named by J.O. Westwood from a specimen that Melly had obtained from Malabar. Westwood, however, spelled his name as "Melley". A number of other insect taxa have been named after him by other entomologists, but not all are valid.

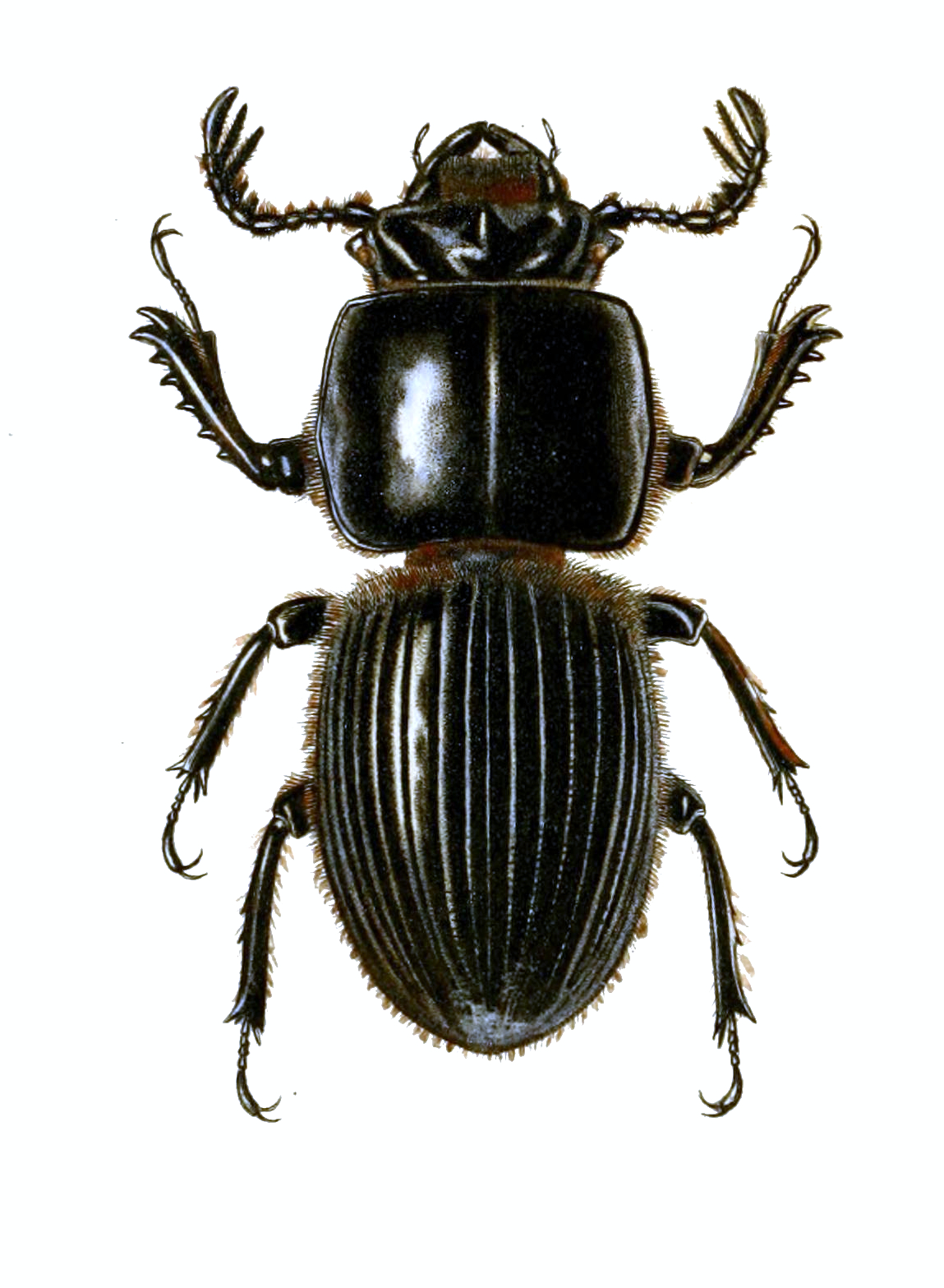
Passalus goryi, the only species that Melly described

- Pseudoblaps mellyi Mulsant & Rey, 1854 (now Pseudoblaps substriata, Tenebrionidae)
- Nebria mellyi Gebler, 1847 (Carabidae)
- Oxycara mellyi Fairmaire, 1898 (Tenebrionidae)
- Zophosis mellyi Deyrolle, 1867 (Tenebrionidae)
- Trigonurus mellyi Mulsant, 1847 (Staphylinidae)
- Tricondyla mellyi Chaudoir, 1850 (Carabidae: Cicindelinae)
- Rhomborhina mellyi (Gory & Percheron, 1833) (Scarabaeidae: Cetoniinae)
- Orthogonius mellyi Chaudoir, 1850 (Carabidae)
- Julodis mellyi Gory, 1840 (now Julodis cirrosa, Buprestidae)
- Eutypus mellyi (Kessel, 1932) (Curculionidae)
- Calodromus mellyi Guérin-Méneville & Gory, 1832 (Brentidae)
- Lepidiota mellyi (Guérin-Méneville & Gory, 1832) (Scarabaeidae: Melolonthinae)
- Cleobora mellyi (Mulsant, 1850) (Coccinellidae)
- Chrysolina mellyi (Stål, 1857) (Chrysomelidae)
- Carabus mellyi Chaudoir, 1846 (Carabidae)
- Megacyllene mellyi (Chevrolat, 1862) (Cerambycidae)
- Stereopalpus mellyi LaFerté-Sénéctaire, 1849 (Anthicidae)
- Homoderus mellyi Parry, 1862 (Lucanidae)
- Anthelephila mellyi (Pic, 1894) (synonym of A. amaena, Anthicidae)
- Anthia omoplata mellyi Brême, 1844 (synonym of A. omoplata, Carabidae)
- Mesogenus mellyi Bonvouloir, 1875 (Eucnemidae)
- Dineutus mellyi (Régimbart, 1882) (Gyrinidae)
- Parischnogaster mellyi (Saussure, 1852) (Hymenoptera: Vespidae)
- Anterhynchium mellyi (Saussure, 1852) (Hymenoptera: Vespidae)
- Catagramma mellyi Guenée, 1872 (now synonym of Callicore hesperis, Lepidoptera:Nymphalidae)
