= Nuneaton's Gold Belt =

Public sculpture in Nuneaton, England

Gold Belt
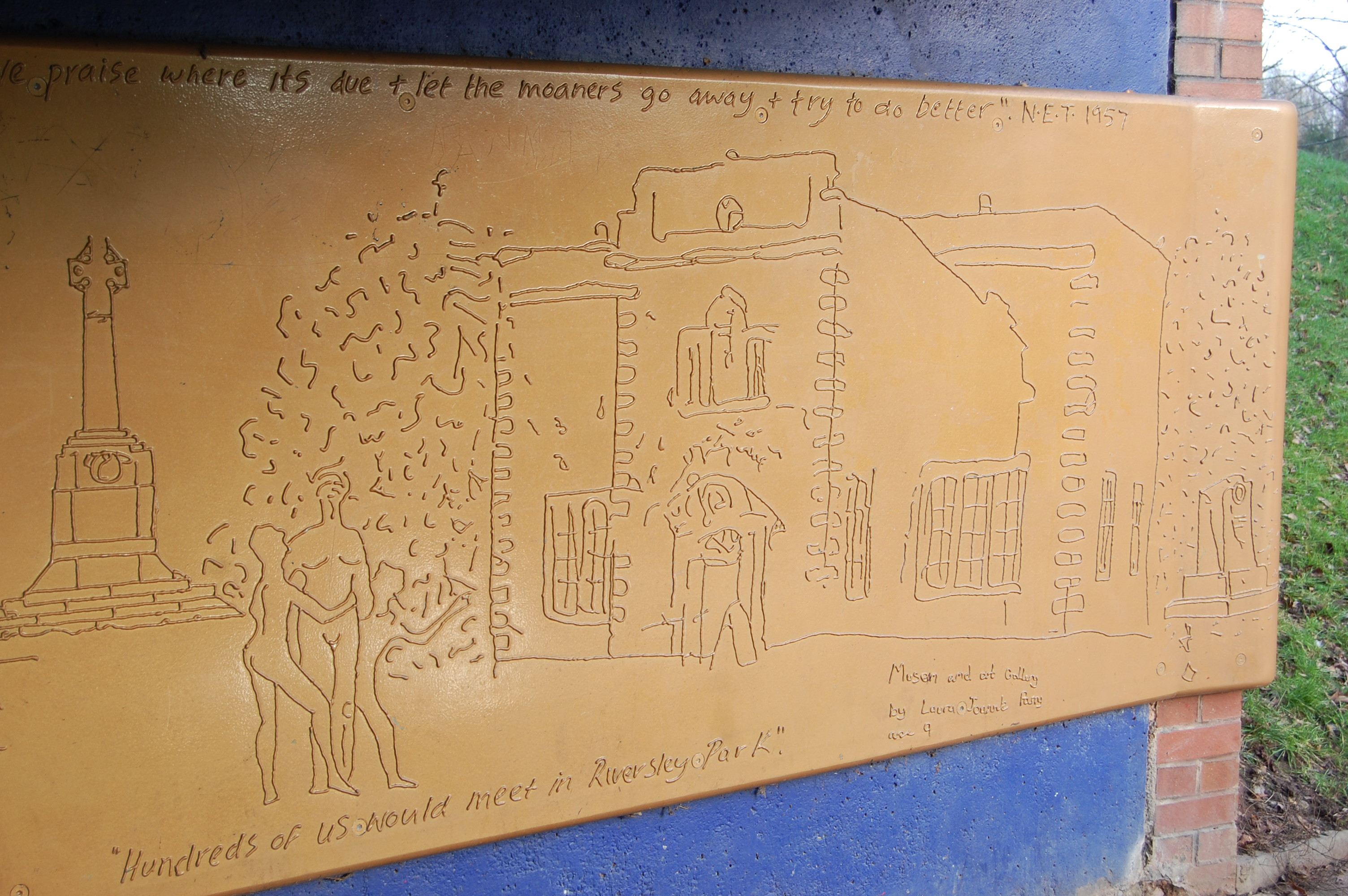
- The belt's right-hand end
- Artist: Alisha Miller
- Year: 2003
- Location: Nuneaton, England; 52°31′15″N 1°27′58″W

The 'Gold Belt' is a public sculpture located in a walkway underneath the Vicarage Road bridge, Nuneaton, England. The walkway links Riversley Park and the George Eliot Memorial Gardens.

The 'Gold Belt' was produced as a result of a project between local artist Alisha Miller, Warwickshire County Council and Nuneaton and Bedworth Borough Council in 2003.

The 'Gold Belt' represents a coal miner's leather belt. This reinforces a local connection through Nuneaton's mining heritage and also links to the Union Wool and Leather Factory that used to be located on the site of a supermarket close to Riversley Park.

The work was inspired by the motto, "a good reputation is better than a belt of gold", of Edward Melly who donated the park to the people of Nuneaton in 1907.

== The Project ==
With financial support from the Countryside Agency and the Local Authorities, a project developed allowing for research into the local area, community workshops and reminiscence activities.

The research included identifying a spot suitable and meaningful for the sculpture. The bridge was identified as a space that could be transformed through having public artwork.

The workshops involved local children and students and were held at Nuneaton Museum & Art Gallery. Historical talks were given and the participants worked with Miller to produce artwork of local scenes. Some of these local scenes are featured on the belt, along with drawings produced by Miller of other local public artwork and features.

A reminiscence session was held at Nuneaton Museum & Art Gallery, sharing photographs and memories with the older community members. These memories were collected and featured alongside the images on the belt.

The work was unveiled by the mayor of Nuneaton, Ian Lloyd, on 11 October 2003.
