= William Roden =

William Roden may refer to:

- William Thomas Roden, English artist
- William Sargeant Roden, English iron master and politician

== See also ==
- William C. Rhoden, American sports journalist and author
