= Edward Kenealy =

Irish lawyer and writer (1819–1880)

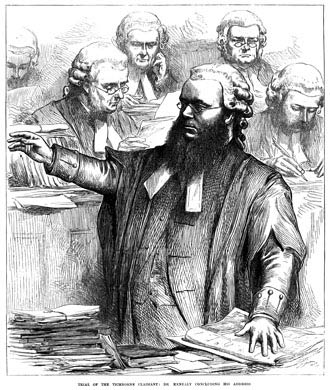
- Kenealy at the Tichborne trial, 1873

Member of Parliament for Stoke-upon-Trent
- In office 18 February 1875 – 7 April 1880 Serving with Robert Heath
- Preceded by: George Melly
- Succeeded by: William Woodall

Personal details
- Born: 2 July 1819 Cork, Ireland
- Died: 16 April 1880 (aged 60) London, England
- Resting place: St Helen's Church, Hangleton
- Spouse: Elizabeth Nicklin (m. 1851)
- Children: 11, including Arabella
- Education: Trinity College Dublin

Edward Vaughan Hyde Kenealy (2 July 1819 – 16 April 1880) was an Irish barrister and writer. He is best remembered as counsel for the Tichborne claimant and the eccentric and disturbed conduct of the trial that led to his ruin.

== Early life ==
He was born on Nile Street (now Sheares Street), Cork, the son of a local merchant. He was educated at Trinity College Dublin, and was called to the Irish Bar in 1840 and to the English Bar in 1847. He obtained a fair practice in criminal cases. In 1868 he became a QC and a bencher of Gray's Inn.

He practised on the Oxford circuit and in the Central Criminal Court and his most famous cases included:

- Defence of Francis Looney and William Dowling against charges of treason-felony, (1848);
- Junior counsel in the unsuccessful defence of poisoner William Palmer, (1856);
- Defence of Ricard O'Sullivan Burke and his accomplice Casey during the Fenian Rising, (1867). Kenealy withdrew from the case following the failed attempt to effect their escape in the Clerkenwell explosion.
- Prosecution of the directors of Overend, Gurney and Company for fraud following the company's collapse, (1869);
- Counsel for Arthur Orton, alias Roger Tichborne, taking over the brief from William Campbell Sleigh in April 1873.

== Private life ==
Kenealy suffered from diabetes and an erratic temperament has sometimes been attributed to poor control of the symptoms. In 1850 he was sentenced to one month imprisonment for punishing his six-year-old illegitimate son with undue severity. He married Elizabeth Nicklin of Tipton, Staffordshire in 1851 and they had eleven children, including novelist Arabella Kenealy (1864–1938). The Kenealy family lived in Portslade, East Sussex, from 1852 until 1874. Edward Kenealy commuted to London and Oxford for his law practice but returned at weekends and other times to be with his family.

In 1850, he published an eccentric poem inspired by Johann Wolfgang von Goethe, Goethe, a New Pantomime. He also published a large amount of poetry in journals such as Fraser's Magazine. He published translations from Latin, Greek, German, Italian, Portuguese, Russian, Irish, Persian, Arabic, Hindustani and Bengali. It is unlikely that he was fluent in all these languages.

In 1866, Kenealy wrote The Book of God: the Apocalypse of Adam-Oannes, an unorthodox theological work in which he claimed that he was the "twelfth messenger of God", descended from Jesus Christ and Genghis Khan.

He also published a more conventional biography of Edward Wortley Montagu in 1869.

== The Tichborne case ==
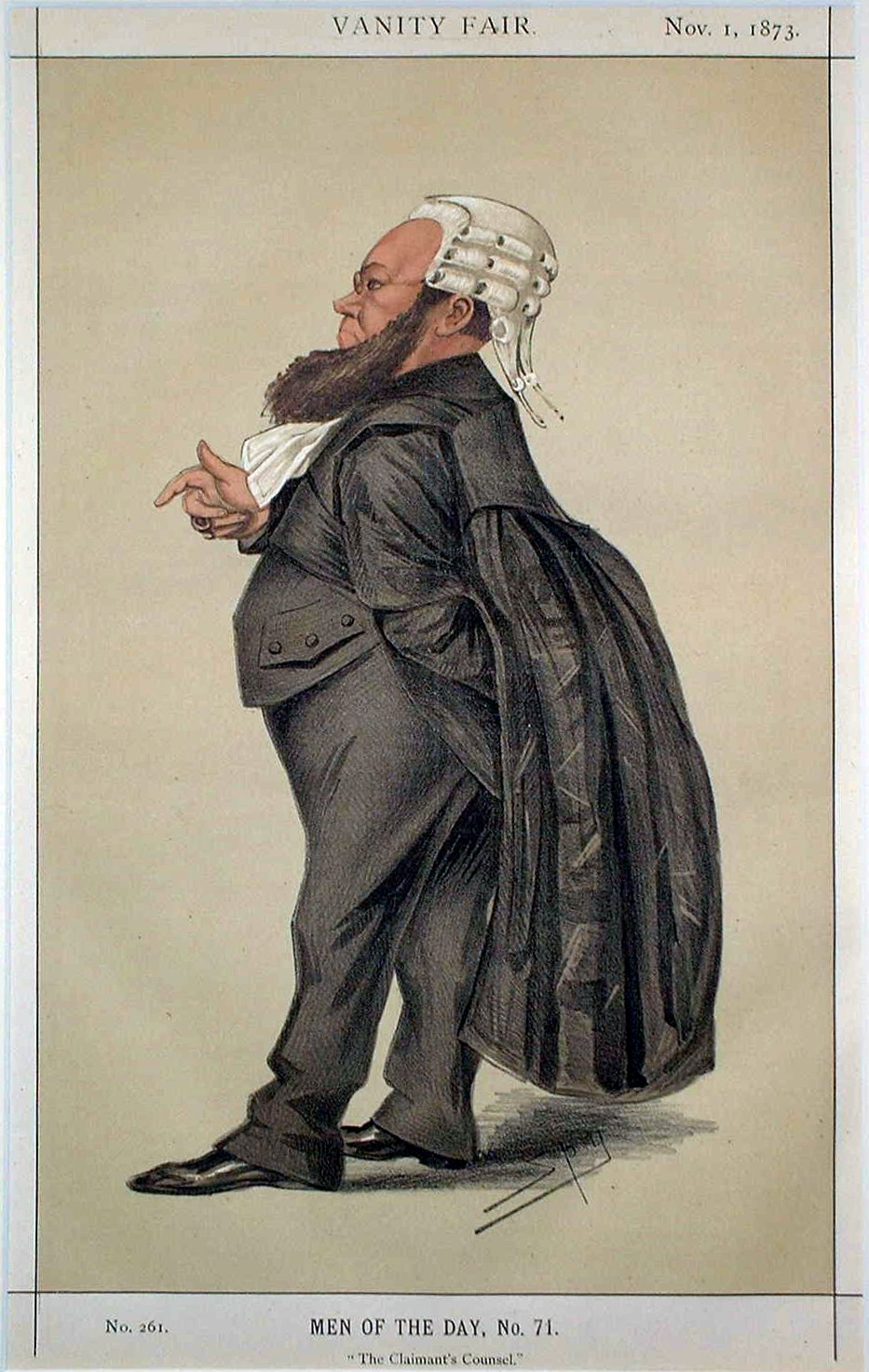

During the trial, Kenealy abused witnesses, made scurrilous allegations against various Roman Catholic institutions, treated the judges with disrespect, and protracted the trial until it became the longest in English legal history. His violent conduct of the case became a public scandal and, after rejecting his client's claim, the jury censured his behaviour.

== The aftermath ==
He started a newspaper, The Englishman, to plead his cause, and to attack the judges. His behaviour was so extreme that in 1874 he was disbenched and disbarred by his Inn. His appointment as a QC was also revoked. He formed the Magna Charta Association and went on a nationwide tour to protest his cause.

At a by-election in 1875, he was elected to Parliament for Stoke-upon-Trent with a majority of 2000 votes. However, no other Member of Parliament would introduce him when he took his seat. Benjamin Disraeli forced a motion to dispense with this convention.

In Parliament, Kenealy called for a Royal Commission into his conduct in the Tichborne case, but lost a vote on this by 433–3. One vote was Kenealy's, another that of his teller, George Hammond Whalley. The third "aye" was by Purcell O'Gorman of Waterford City. During this period, he also wrote a nine-volume account of the case.

Dr Kenealy, as he was always called, gradually ceased to attract attention, lost his seat at the 1880 general election.

On 16 April 1880, Kenealy died in London, before the close of polling, aged 60. He is buried in the churchyard of St Helen's Church, Hangleton, East Sussex.

== Bibliography ==
- Works by or about Edward Kenealy at the Internet Archive
- Hamilton, J. A., rev. R. McWilliam (2004) "Kenealy, Edward Vaughan Hyde (1819–1880)", Oxford Dictionary of National Biography, Oxford University Press, accessed 26 August 2007 (subscription, Wikipedia Library access or UK public library membership required)
- Edward Kenealy (6 February 1875). The trial at bar of Sir Roger C. D. Tichborne (PDF).
- Kenealy. A., ed. (2006) [1908]. Memoirs of Edward Vaughn Kenealy. London: Kessinger. ISBN 1-4254-8405-0.
- Roe, M. (1974). Kenealy and the Tichborne Cause: A Study in mid-Victorian Populism. Melbourne: Melbourne University Press. ISBN 0-522-84057-4.
- Waterhouse, G. (1952) "Goethe's Irish Enemy – Edward Kenealy", in Boyd, J. (ed.) German Studies presented to Leonard Ashley Willoughby – by pupils, colleagues and friends on his retirement, Oxford: Blackwell

Parliament of the United Kingdom
Preceded by George Melly	Member of Parliament for Stoke-upon-Trent; 1875–1880; With: Robert Heath	Succeeded by William Woodall
