= John Lewis Ricardo =

British businessman and politician

Member of Parliament for Stoke-upon-Trent
- In office 1841–1862 Serving with William Taylor Copeland, Hon. Frederick Leveson-Gower, William Taylor Copeland
- Preceded by: John Davenport; William Taylor Copeland
- Succeeded by: William Taylor Copeland; Henry Grenfell

Personal details
- Born: 1812 London, England
- Died: 2 August 1862 (aged 49–50) West Brompton, England
- Spouse: Catherine Duff (m. 1841; died 1862)
- Children: Alexander Ricardo
- Occupation: Businessman, politician

John Lewis Ricardo (1812 – 2 August 1862) was a British businessman and politician.

== Early life ==
Ricardo was born in London in 1812. He was the eldest son of financier Jacob Ricardo and nephew of the economist David Ricardo.

== Career ==
Following the death of his father in 1834, Ricardo abandoned his plans for a career in the British Army and, instead, took over his father's financial firm, in partnership with his uncle, Samson Ricardo. He is of Sephardic-Jewish descent.

Ricardo was Chairman of the North Staffordshire Railway from 1846 until his death. In 1846, he and William Fothergill Cooke founded the Electric Telegraph Company, the world's first public telegraph company, and Ricardo served as chairman until its merger with the International Telegraph Company in 1856. He was also a director of London and Westminster Bank.

Ricardo was a leader of a group of businessmen who, in 1845, purchased the patents for the electric telegraph designed by Cooke and Wheatstone. Ricardo was Electric Telegraph's largest shareholder, and its executive chairman, for its first 12 years. His goal was to build a network that would distribute breaking financial news to his own newsrooms adjacent to all British stock exchanges—an information monopoly that would be valuable to speculators and investors. However, when the established telegraph companies formed monopolistic cartels and raised prices to newspapers, Ricardo secretly switched sides and campaigned for their nationalization.

=== Political career ===
In 1841 he was elected Member of Parliament for Stoke-on-Trent as a Liberal, serving until his death. In the House, he was an advocate for free trade and was active in the repeal of the Navigation Acts in 1849.

== Personal life ==
In 1841, he married Catherine Duff (c. 1820–1869), the daughter of General Sir Alexander Duff and sister of James Duff, 5th Earl Fife. Together, they had one son:

- Alexander Ricardo (1843–1871), who married Florence Campbell, the eldest daughter of Robert Campbell.

Ricardo died in West Brompton on 2 August 1862.

== Publications ==
- The anatomy of the Navigation Acts, Charles Gilpin, London (1847)

Parliament of the United Kingdom
Preceded by John Davenport; William Taylor Copeland	Member of Parliament for Stoke-upon-Trent; 1841–1862; With: William Taylor Copeland 1841–1852; Hon. Frederick Leveson-Gower 1852–1857; William Taylor Copeland 1857–1862	Succeeded by William Taylor Copeland; Henry Grenfell
