= Douglas Coghill =

British politician

Coghill in 1895.

Douglas Harry Coghill (6 August 1855 – 13 December 1928) was MP for Newcastle-under-Lyme from 1886 to 1892 and then Stoke-upon-Trent from 1895 to 1906. He was elected as a Liberal Unionist in 1886 and 1895 but had joined their Conservative coalition ally in time for the 1900 General Election. Coghill was defeated in 1906 and did not stand again for political office.

Parliament of the United Kingdom
Preceded by William Shepherd Allen	Member of Parliament for Newcastle-under-Lyme; 1886 – 1892	Succeeded by William Allen
Preceded by George Leveson-Gower	Member of Parliament for Stoke-upon-Trent; 1895 – 1906	Succeeded by John Ward
