= Henry Grenfell =

British banker and Liberal Party politician

Henry Riversdale Grenfell (5 April 1824 – 11 September 1902) was a British banker and Liberal Party politician.

== Biography ==
His Cornish grandfather Pascoe Grenfell was a tin and copper manager and Member of Parliament (MP), while his father, Charles Pascoe Grenfell, was a director of the Bank of England from 1830 to 1864. His maternal grandfather was William Philip Molyneux, 2nd Earl of Sefton.

Grenfell was elected as a Liberal Member of Parliament for Stoke-upon-Trent at a by-election in September 1862, and was re-elected at the general election in 1865. At the general election three years later, in 1868, he stood in the Liberal interest for South West Lancashire, but was defeated. He came forward again at the general election of 1880, standing for Barnstaple, but was again defeated.

He was a leading member of the Bimetallic League, and Governor of the Bank of England between 1881 and 1883 following a period as its Deputy Governor. He was also a member of the Council of the Corporation of Foreign Bondholders and was on the boards of several insurance companies.

Grenfell died of pneumonia at Bacres, Henley-on-Thames, on 11 September 1902.

His son, Edward Grenfell, also became a Member of Parliament and Bank of England director, and was the partner of Junius Spencer Morgan in the firm of Morgan, Grenfell & Company.

Parliament of the United Kingdom
| Preceded by John Ricardo; William Taylor Copeland | Member of Parliament for Stoke-upon-Trent; 1862 – 1868; With: William Taylor Copeland to 1865; Alexander Beresford Hope 1865 – Feb 1868; George Melly from Feb 1868 | Succeeded by William Sargeant Roden; George Melly |
Government offices
| Preceded by John William Birch | Governor of the Bank of England; 1881–1883 | Succeeded by John Saunders Gilliat |
