= Frederick Leveson-Gower (Bodmin MP) =

British barrister and politician

The Honourable Frederick Leveson-Gower DL, JP
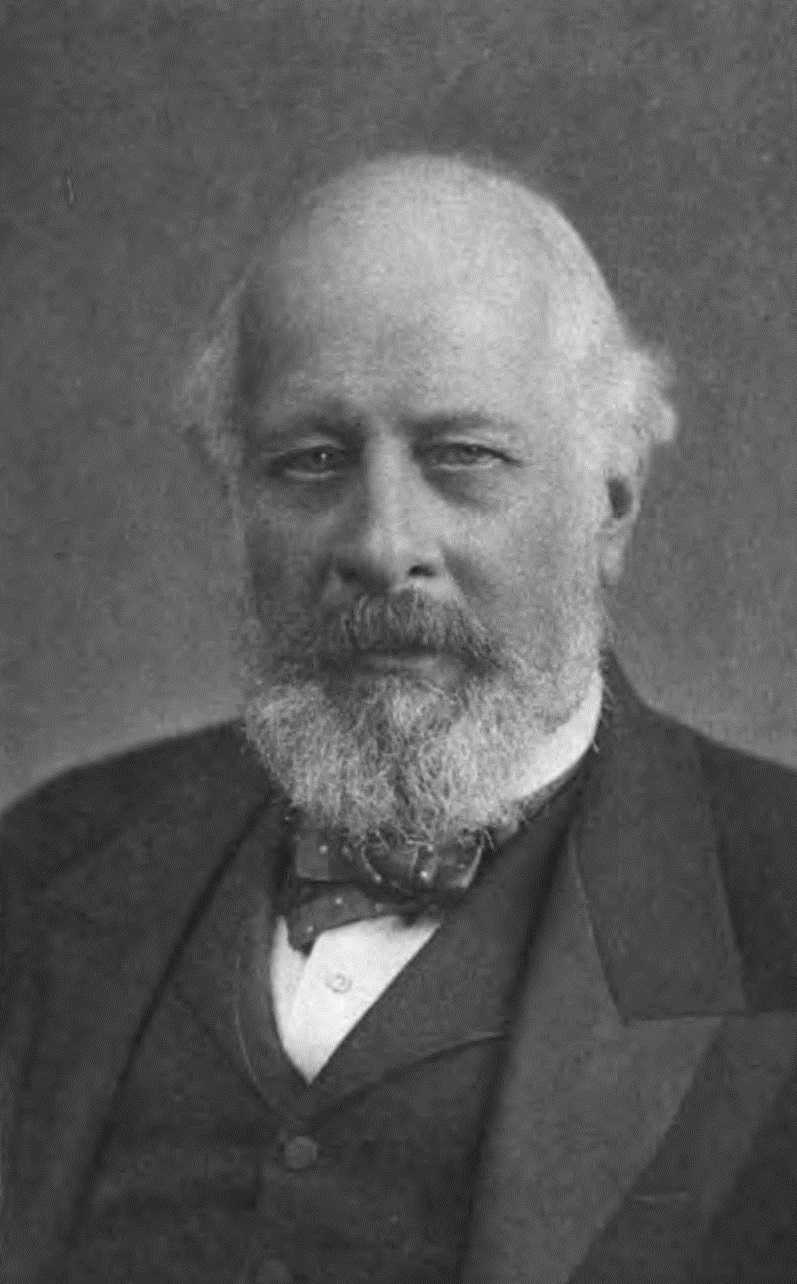

Member of Parliament for Bodmin
- In office 1859–1885 Serving with William Michell, James Wyld
- Preceded by: Hon. John Vivian; James Wyld
- Succeeded by: Leonard Henry Courtney

Member of Parliament for Stoke-upon-Trent
- In office 1852–1857 Serving with John Ricardo
- Preceded by: William Taylor Copeland; John Ricardo
- Succeeded by: William Taylor Copeland; John Ricardo

Member of Parliament for Derby
- In office 1847–1847 Serving with Edward Strutt
- Preceded by: John Ponsonby; Edward Strutt
- Succeeded by: Michael Thomas Bass; Lawrence Heyworth

Personal details
- Born: Hon. Edward Frederick Leveson-Gower; 3 May 1819 London, England
- Died: 30 May 1907 (aged 88) Marylebone, London, England
- Spouse: Lady Margaret Compton (m. 1851; died 1858)
- Relations: William Cavendish, 5th Duke of Devonshire (grandfather); Granville Leveson-Gower, 2nd Earl Granville (brother)
- Children: Sir George Leveson-Gower
- Parent(s): Granville Leveson-Gower, 1st Earl Granville; Lady Harriet Elizabeth Cavendish
- Education: Eton College
- Alma mater: Christ Church, Oxford

Hon. Edward Frederick Leveson-Gower DL, JP (3 May 1819 – 30 May 1907), commonly known as Freddy Leveson, was a British barrister, Liberal politician, and aristocrat from the Leveson-Gower family.

== Early life ==
Leveson-Gower was the third son and youngest child of Granville Leveson-Gower, 1st Earl Granville and his wife Lady Harriet Elizabeth Cavendish, second daughter of Lady Georgiana Spencer and William Cavendish, 5th Duke of Devonshire.

His eldest brother, Granville, succeeded their father as earl, while his other brother, William, died at age 16 following several years of paralysis. His sisters were the novelist Lady Georgiana Fullerton and Lady Susan, the wife of George Pitt-Rivers, 4th Baron Rivers.

He spent his early childhood, first in his father's residence at Wherstead, and when his father had become ambassador in France in 1824, at the British embassy in Paris, where he was a playmate of Henri, comte de Chambord.

Aged eight, he was sent back to England on a school in Brighton, after which he entered Eton College. Leveson-Gower left the latter in 1835 and was privately educated for the next two years, until he went on Christ Church, Oxford in 1837. He graduated with a Bachelor of Arts in 1840 and a Master of Arts four years later.

== Career ==
After his Grand Tour, he was then called to the bar by the Inner Temple in 1845, practising in the Oxford circuit.

Leveson-Gower entered the British House of Commons for Derby with the support of his uncle William Cavendish, 6th Duke of Devonshire in May 1847. However, the election was overturned on petition in July and Leveson-Gower did not stand in the by-election. From 1851, he worked as précis writer in the Foreign Office until the following year, when by the influence of his cousin George Sutherland-Leveson-Gower, 2nd Duke of Sutherland, he stood successfully as a Member of Parliament (MP) for Stoke-upon-Trent. In 1856, Leveson-Gower joined his brother Granville on a special mission to Russia. He lost his seat, however, in the general election of 1857.

Two years later, he was returned for Bodmin and represented the constituency until his retirement from politics in 1885. Leveson-Gower was a Justice of the Peace for Surrey and served as a Deputy Lieutenant for the county.

== Personal life ==
Having travelled to India in 1850, Leveson-Gower, after his return, married Lady Margaret Compton, daughter of Spencer Compton, 2nd Marquess of Northampton, on 1 June 1851. They had two children, one surviving:

- Unnamed daughter (8 February 1854), stillborn at 145 Piccadilly
- Sir George Granville Leveson-Gower (1858–1951), M.P. for North West Staffordshire and also for Stoke-upon-Trent. He married the Hon. Adelaide Violet Cicely Monson, daughter of Debonnaire John Monson, 8th Baron Monson.

Three days after the birth of their son, Lady Margaret died of measles contracted during her pregnancy, aged 28.

Leveson-Gower never remarried and died in 1907, aged 88, having been in his later life a friend of William Ewart Gladstone and his wife.

Parliament of the United Kingdom
Preceded by John Ponsonby; Edward Strutt	Member of Parliament for Derby; May–July 1847; With: Edward Strutt	Succeeded by Michael Thomas Bass; Lawrence Heyworth
Preceded by William Taylor Copeland; John Ricardo	Member of Parliament for Stoke-upon-Trent; 1852–1857; With: John Ricardo	Succeeded by William Taylor Copeland; John Ricardo
Preceded by John Vivian; James Wyld	Member of Parliament for Bodmin; 1859–1885; With: William Michell 1859; James Wyld 1859–1868	Succeeded by Leonard Courtney
