= William Leatham Bright =

English Liberal politician

William Leatham Bright (12 August 1851 – 23 September 1910) was an English Liberal politician.

Bright was the son of John Bright, M.P., of One Ash, Rochdale and his wife Margaret Elizabeth Leatham. They employed Lydia Rous to teach their children. In time, he was educated at Grove House School, Tottenham, and at the University of London. He became a colliery agent and ship broker.

In 1885 Bright, was elected as a Member of Parliament for Stoke-upon-Trent. He was in favour of Irish Home Rule and came into disagreement with his father on the matter and received a parental wigging. He is said to have left his father speechless by regretting in response that "two statesmen could not discuss politics without indulging in unnecessary personalities". Bright suffered from ill-health and resigned his seat in 1890.

Bright died at the age of 59.

Bright married Isabella McIvor Tylor at Carshalton in 1883.

Parliament of the United Kingdom
Preceded by William Woodall; Henry Broadhurst	Member of Parliament for Stoke-upon-Trent; 1885–1890	Succeeded by George Leveson-Gower
