= John Davenport (industrialist) =

English industrial potter, industrialist and MP

John Davenport (29 September 1765 – 12 December 1848) was one of the most financially successful English industrial potters, founder of the Davenport Pottery firm in Longport in The Potteries. He served as the Conservative M.P. for Stoke from 1832 to 1841.

A native of the nearby rural town of Leek, he worked for a while for a local bank. Then, in 1794, he set himself up as a pottery manufacturer in Longport, Stoke-on-Trent. His ruthless business sense combined with the technical breakthroughs of Wedgwood and Spode, made his firm a formidable force in the growing export trade from the Potteries.

He married Diana Ward in 1795 and they had two daughters and three sons. Davenport resided at Westwood Hall from 1813, and the running of his business began to pass to his son Henry in the 1820s. This left Davenport time to become involved in politics. He served in the Commons as a diligent local M.P. until 1841. He was also deputy lieutenant for Staffordshire.

A portrait of Davenport by an unknown artist is held by the Potteries Museum & Art Gallery.

Parliament of the United Kingdom
New constituency	Member of Parliament for Stoke-upon-Trent; 1832–1841; With: Josiah Wedgwood II to 1835; Richard Edensor Heathcote 1835–1836; George Anson 1836–1837; William Taylor Copeland from 1837	Succeeded by William Taylor Copeland; John Lewis Ricardo
