= Nuneaton Museum & Art Gallery =

Museum and gallery in Riversley Park, Nuneaton, England

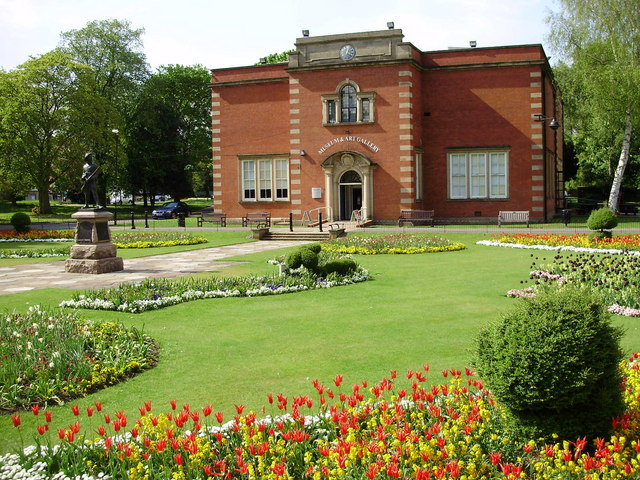
- Nuneaton Museum & Art Gallery
- Established: 1917; 109 years ago
- Location: Riversley Park, Coton Road, Nuneaton, Warwickshire, England
- Coordinates: 52.5202°N 1.4661°W
- Website: www.nuneatonandbedworth.gov.uk/museum

Nuneaton Museum & Art Gallery is set in the grounds of Riversley Park, Nuneaton, England, and has three galleries which house regularly changing temporary and touring exhibitions. There is a gallery dedicated to the writer George Eliot, together with two others focusing on local history and fine art. There is a small display of objects which belonged to the comedian Larry Grayson.

The museum was paid for as a gift to Nuneaton from Edward Ferdinand Melly. The son of Charles Pierre Melly, Edward Melly was born on 7 July 1857, at Riversley, the family's house in Mossley Hill, Liverpool. He moved to Nuneaton to work as Manager of the Griff Colliery Company. In 1913 he offered to provide the money to build a museum and gallery in Riversley Park which he had already gifted to the town and had plans drawn up. The Museum & Art Gallery opened on Sunday, 1 April 1917.

In 1941 a bombing raid resulted in Melly's death and significant damage to the building. Since many records were lost, knowledge of the origins of the museum's collection is now sometimes lacking. The gallery was not fully reopened until 1960.
