= William Woodall =

British Liberal politician, philanthropist and supporter of women's suffrage

William Woodall JP

Member of Parliament for Stoke-upon-Trent
- In office 1880–1885

Member of Parliament for Hanley
- In office 1885–1900

Personal details
- Born: 15 March 1832
- Died: 8 April 1901 (aged 69)
- Party: Liberal

William Woodall (Shrewsbury 15 March 1832 – Llandudno 8 April 1901), was a British Liberal politician, philanthropist and supporter of women's suffrage.

== Life ==
He was the elder son of William Woodall, of Shrewsbury, and his wife Martha (née Basson). He was educated at the Crescent Congregational Schools, Liverpool. He thereafter trained as a gas engineer at the works of the Liverpool Gas Company. By 1857 he had become a gasworks manager for the Burslem and Tunstall Gas Company and, since the company never actually operated in Tunstall, this works must have been in Burslem.

Woodall married Evelyn, daughter of Burslem china manufacturer James Macintyre, in 1862. They lived at Longport in the 1860s, where Woodall was a Sunday School teacher. Woodall was later taken into a business partnership by his father-in-law, who operated a china works at the Washington Works at Burslem. Woodall became a senior partner in the firm, after James Macintyre's death in December 1868. William and his wife Evelyn had no children. Evelyn died in 1870, just two years after her father's death. Woodall remained a widower until his death.

Apart from his early business career in Burslem he was also: Chairman of the Burslem School Board from 1868 to 1880; Secretary of the Wedgwood Institute Committee during the time of its building and opening; and served as Chairman of the North Staffordshire Society for Promotion of the Welfare of the Deaf and Dumb.

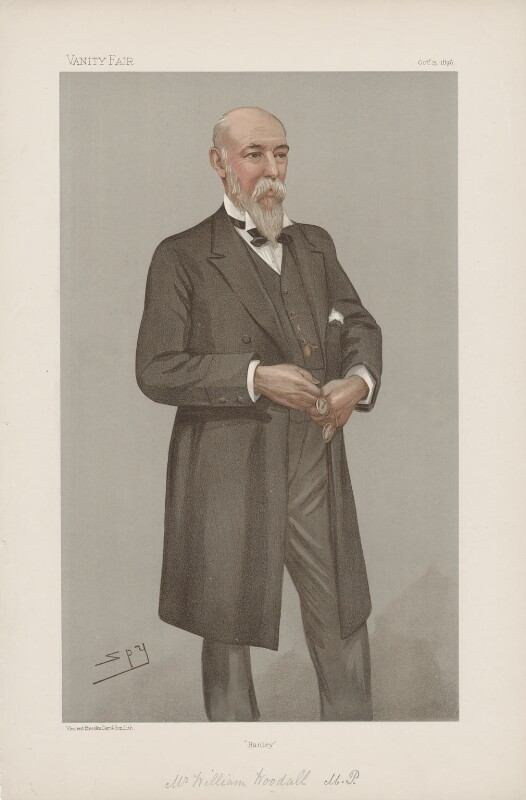
Caricature by the artist Leslie Ward, drawn for Vanity Fair, 1896

In 1880 Woodall entered Parliament as an M.P. for Stoke-upon-Trent, a seat he held until 1885. He then represented Hanley in Stoke-on-Trent, until 1900. He was a member of the Royal Commission on Technical Education from 1881 to 1884. He served as Surveyor-General of the Ordnance under William Ewart Gladstone in 1886, and as Financial Secretary to the War Office under Gladstone and later Lord Rosebery from 1892 to 1895. He was on the Care of Blind and Deaf Mutes Royal Commission from 1886 to 1889, was a member of the Royal Commission on Technical Instruction, and also authored the report of the Select Committee on Volunteer Acts (1894). However, he is best remembered as a supporter of women's suffrage in the House of Commons. Woodall became leader of the woman suffrage party in the House of Commons in 1884, and several times unsuccessfully presented bills for the introduction of women's suffrage. He was also a firm supporter of Irish Home Rule.

Obituaries also state that he acted as a Justice of the Peace for Staffordshire, and was at one time a Chief Bailiff of Burslem. Woodall became the Chairman of the Sneyd Colliery Company in North Staffordshire, one of the oldest coal mines in the UK, which he was said to own. One of his hobbies was the collecting and appreciation of oil and water-colour pictures and Continental pottery. He was also a great traveler, and was one of the first to enter Paris after the Siege of Paris (1870–1871), which is recorded in his book Paris After Two Sieges (1872). He used his influence as an M.P. to lobby prominent people of the day to lecture at the Wedgwood Memorial Institute in Burslem.

Woodall died at Llandudno, in North Wales.

== Writings ==
- Paris After Two Sieges: Notes of Visits During the Armistice, and Immediately After (Tinsley Bros., 1872).

Parliament of the United Kingdom
Preceded by Robert Heath; Edward Kenealy	Member of Parliament for Stoke-upon-Trent; 1880–1885; With: Henry Broadhurst	Succeeded by William Leatham Bright (representation reduced to one member 1885)
New constituency	Member of Parliament for Hanley; 1885–1900	Succeeded by Arthur Heath
Political offices
Preceded by Guy Dawnay	Surveyor-General of the Ordnance; 1886	Succeeded by Henry Northcote
Preceded by St John Brodrick	Financial Secretary to the War Office; 1892–1895	Succeeded by Joseph Powell Williams
