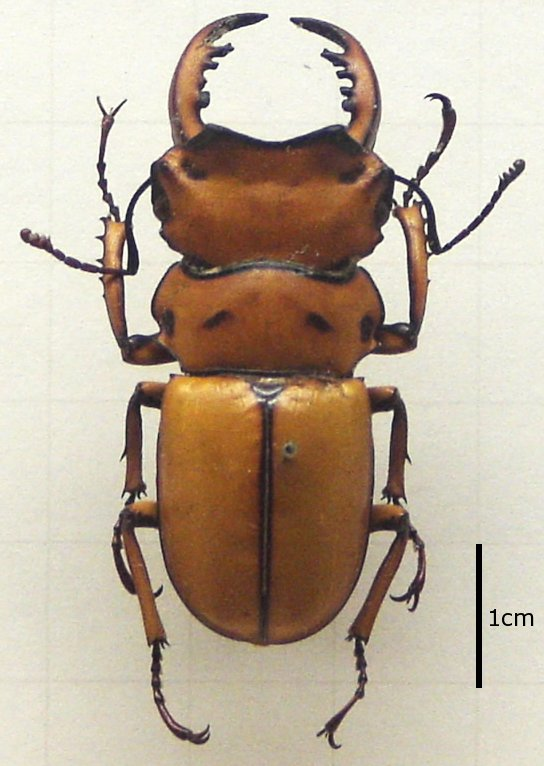

Scientific classification
- Kingdom: Animalia
- Phylum: Arthropoda
- Clade: Pancrustacea
- Class: Insecta
- Order: Coleoptera
- Suborder: Polyphaga
- Infraorder: Scarabaeiformia
- Family: Lucanidae
- Genus: Homoderus
- Species: H. mellyi

Binomial name
- Homoderus mellyi Parry, 1862

= Homoderus mellyi =

Species of beetle

Homoderus mellyi is a species of stag beetle in the family Lucanidae. The species is named after the insect collector André Melly.
