= George Leveson-Gower =

British civil servant and Liberal politician

Sir George Leveson-Gower KBE
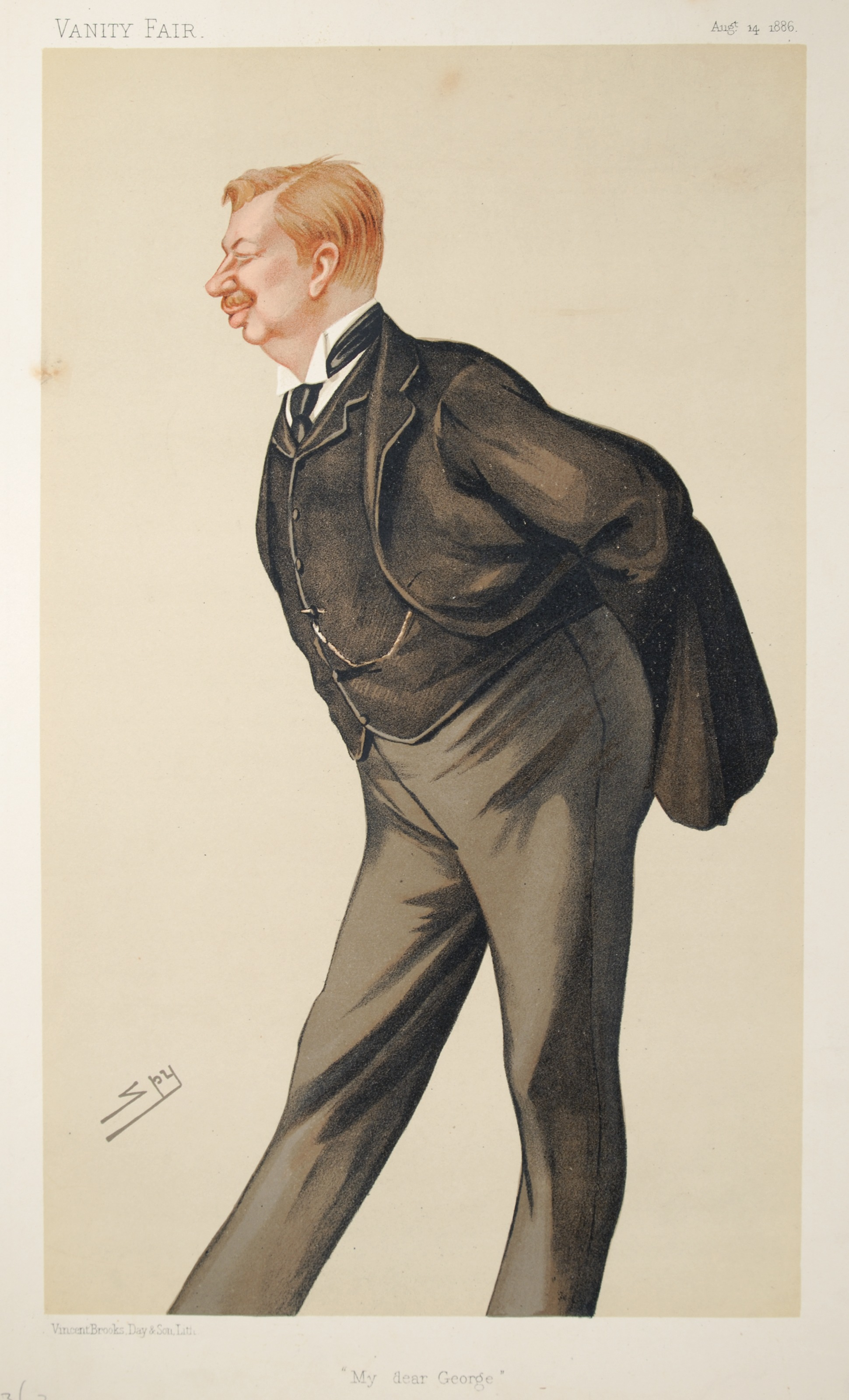
- "My dear George". Caricature of Edward Leveson-Gower by Spy published in Vanity Fair in 1886.

Comptroller of the Household
- In office 25 August 1892 – 21 June 1895
- Monarch: Victoria
- Prime Minister: William Ewart Gladstone; The Earl of Rosebery
- Preceded by: Lord Arthur Hill
- Succeeded by: Lord Arthur Hill

Personal details
- Born: 19 May 1858
- Died: 18 July 1951 (aged 93)
- Party: Liberal
- Spouse: Hon. Adelaide Monson (m. 1898)
- Children: 3
- Education: Balliol College, Oxford

Sir George Granville Leveson-Gower KBE (19 May 1858 – 18 July 1951), was a British civil servant and Liberal politician from the Leveson-Gower family. He held political office as Comptroller of the Household between 1892 and 1895 and later served as a Commissioner of Woods and Forests from 1908 to 1924. In 1921 he was knighted.

== Background and education ==
A member of the Leveson-Gower family headed by the Duke of Sutherland, Leveson-Gower was the son of the Honourable Frederick Leveson-Gower, third son of Granville Leveson-Gower, 1st Earl Granville. His mother was Lady Margaret Compton, daughter of Spencer Compton, 2nd Marquess of Northampton. She died shortly after his birth and his father never remarried. He was educated at Eton and Balliol College, Oxford.

== Career ==
Leveson-Gower was private secretary to Prime Minister William Ewart Gladstone from 1880 to 1885. He then entered Parliament for Staffordshire North-West, and served under Gladstone as a Junior Lord of the Treasury from February to July 1886. He lost his seat in the 1886 general election but returned to the House of Commons when he was elected for Stoke-upon-Trent in an 1890 by-election, a seat he held until 1895. He was Comptroller of the Household from 1892 to 1895 under Gladstone and later Lord Rosebery. Leveson-Gower later served as chairman of the Home Counties Liberal Federation from 1905 to 1908 and as a Commissioner of Woods and Forests from 1908 to 1924. He was appointed Knight Commander of the Order of the British Empire (KBE) in January 1921.

== Family ==
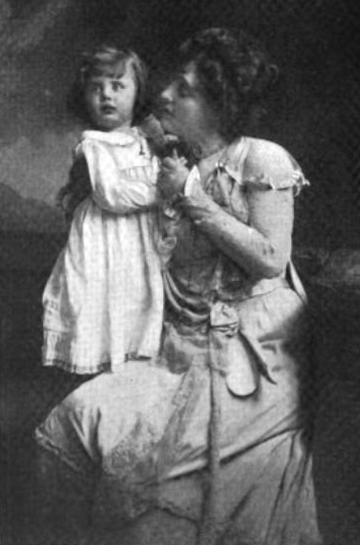
Adelaide Violet Cicely Leveson-Gower and daughter Iris in 1902

Leveson-Gower married the Honourable Adelaide Violet Cicely Monson, daughter of Debonnaire John Monson, 8th Baron Monson, in 1898. They had three daughters. He died in London on 18 July 1951, aged 93. Lady Leveson-Gower died in April 1955.

Parliament of the United Kingdom
New constituency	Member of Parliament for Staffordshire North-West; 1885–1886	Succeeded by Justinian Edwards-Heathcote
Preceded by William Leatham Bright	Member of Parliament for Stoke-upon-Trent; 1890–1895	Succeeded by Douglas Harry Coghill
Political offices
Preceded by Lord Arthur Hill	Comptroller of the Household; 1892–1895	Succeeded by Lord Arthur Hill
Church of England titles
Preceded by Charles Algernon Whitmore	Second Church Estates Commissioner; 1892–1895	Succeeded by Sir Lees Knowles
