= William Taylor Copeland =

Lord Mayor of London

Alderman, Lord Mayor William Taylor Copeland MP
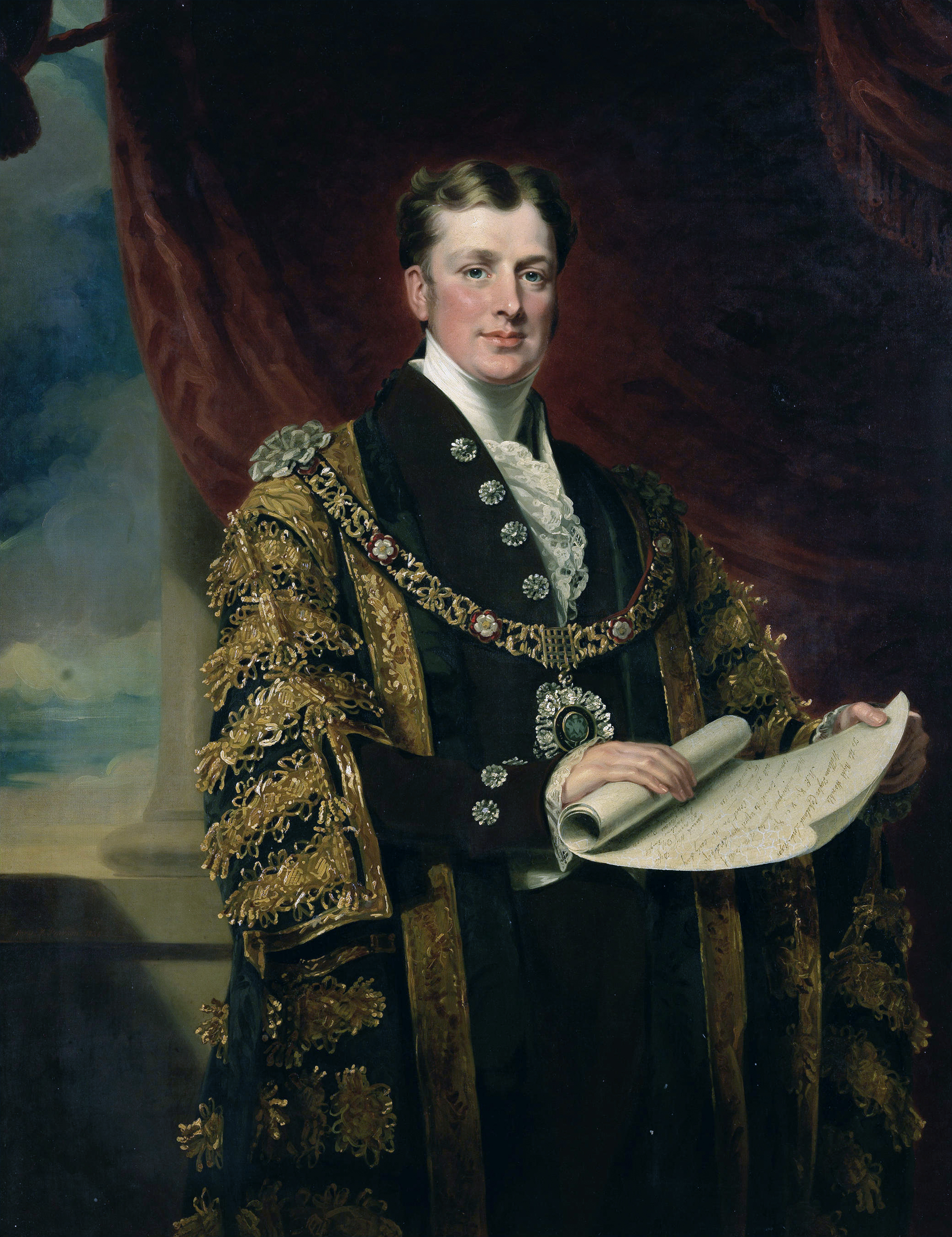
- William Taylor Copeland (Mary Martha Pearson, 1835)

Member of Parliament for Coleraine

Member of Parliament for Stoke upon Trent
- Preceded by: Hon. George Anson
- Succeeded by: John Ricardo

Personal details
- Born: 1797 London, England
- Died: 12 April 1868 (aged 70–71)
- Party: Conservative
- Other political affiliations: Whig (until 1837)

William Taylor Copeland, MP, Alderman (1797 – 12 April 1868) was a British businessman and politician who served as Lord Mayor of London and a Member of Parliament.

== Pottery business ==
William Taylor Copeland was the only son of William Copeland, partner of Josiah Spode II in the Stoke Potteries, and his wife Mary Fowler. He succeeded his father in 1827 as head of the porcelain firm in Portugal Street, London and eventually bought out the interests of the Spode family in the business in the Potteries and London. He ran the business in partnership with Thomas Garrett, formerly manager of the Spode works at Stoke-on-Trent, between 1833 and 1847. After the dissolution of the Copeland & Garrett partnership, it traded as W. T. Copeland & Sons. Art director to the company was Thomas Battam.

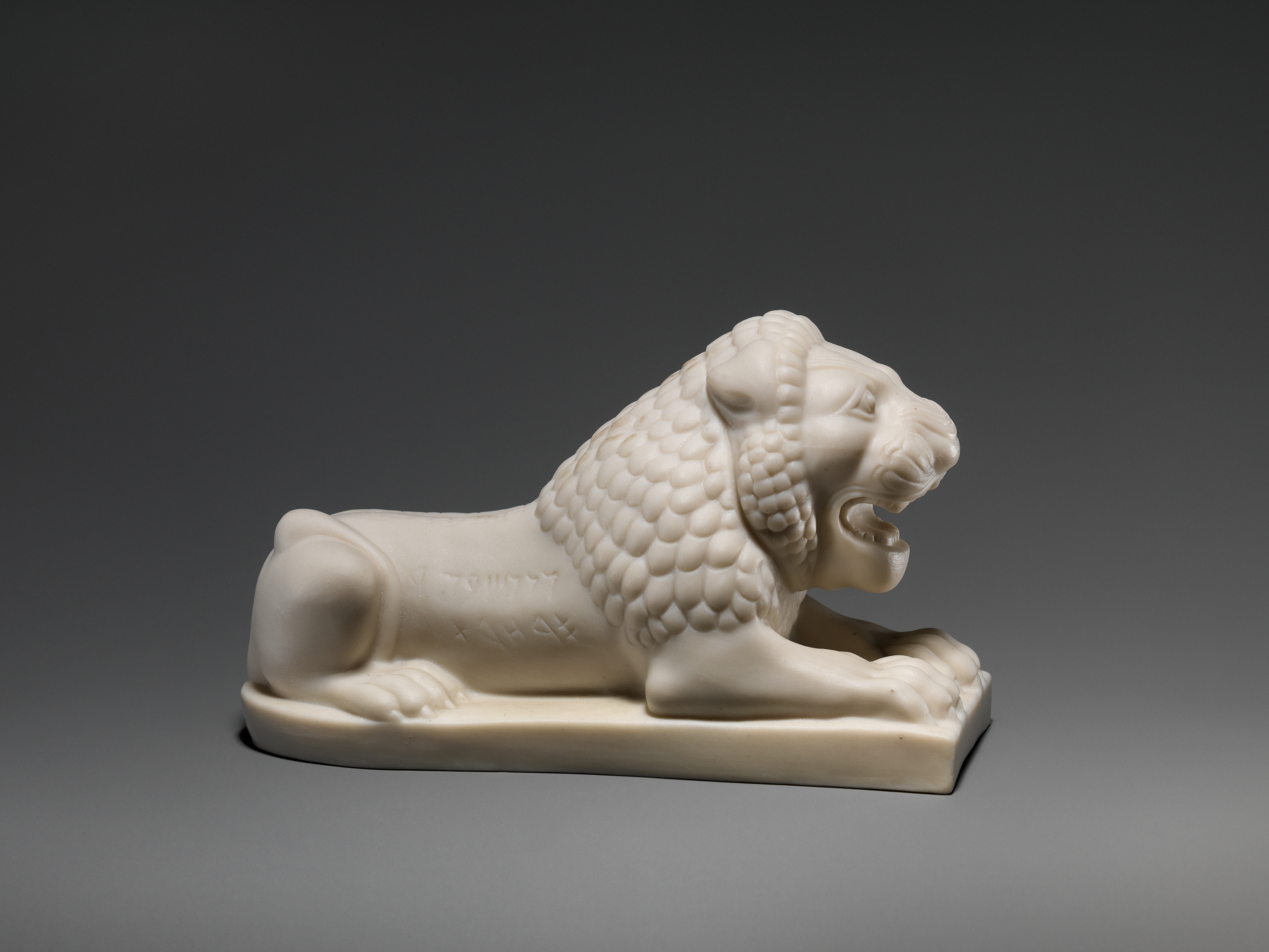
Figure of a Lion by Aaron Hays, Copeland & Garrett, now in the Metropolitan Museum of Art

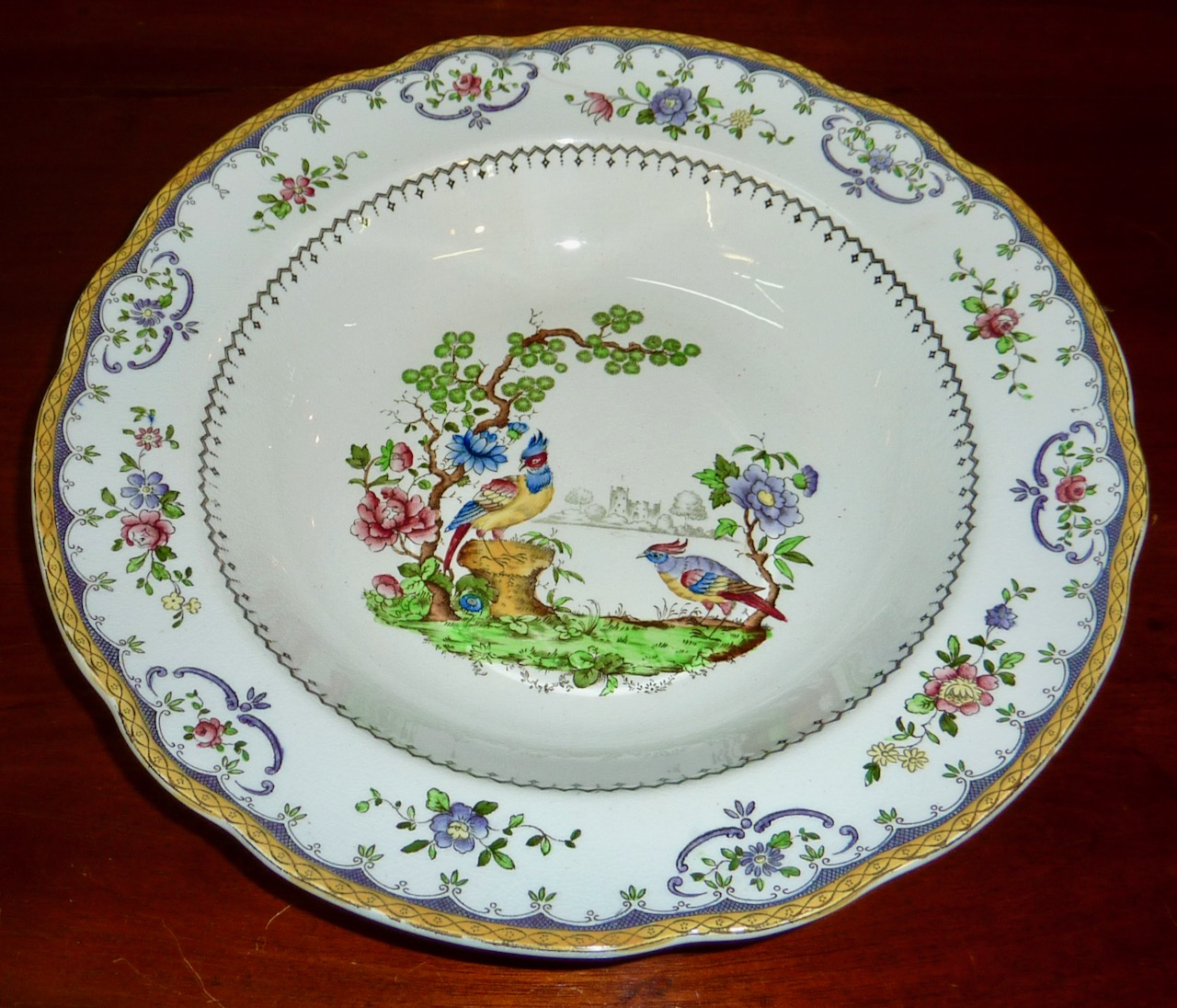
Copeland Spode "Chelsea pattern" bowl

Medea, Parian ware figure by W. T. Copeland & Sons, later 19th century, now in the Cleveland Museum of Art

The company in 1842 developed Parian ware, for statuary, with Copeland and Battam credited for its introduction. Battam claimed he was the originator. There was a priority dispute with Mintons, who introduced the "Parian" term for what the Copeland factory called "statuary porcelain"; but Robert Hunt Handbook to the Great Exhibition upheld Battam's claim.

In 1866 Copeland was appointed china and glass manufacturer to the Prince of Wales.

== Railway and coal interests ==
Copeland became a director of the London and Birmingham Railway Company. He was the first Chairman of the Provisional Directors of the Trent Valley Railway Company (TVRC), appointed on 11 April 1844 at their first meeting. He resigned his post in February 1845, his successor being Edmund Peel. He was a Director of the North Staffordshire Railway Company from 1846 to 1852.

Copeland was also a major investor in Fenton Park Colliery, Fenton being one of the six towns that became the borough of Stoke-on-Trent, where he bought into the Spode family interest, in 1833. In the 1840s he was running the Berry Hill Colliery near Botteslow, to the north of Fenton.

== Local politics and positions ==
Copeland was active in the civic life of the City of London. He served as Sheriff of London and Middlesex in 1828–29; and he was He was elected alderman for Bishopsgate ward in 1829, winning a contest with the stationer and printer John Fowler Dove, and then held the position for the rest of his life. In 1835 he was elected Lord Mayor of London (the third youngest man to hold that office) for 1835–36.

He was a member of the Goldsmiths' Company and its master in 1837–38. For seven years he was president of the royal hospitals of Bridewell and Bethlem, as well as a member of the Irish Society and President of the Honourable Artillery Company. In 1834 he was the first President of Forest School.

== National politics ==
Copeland was active in Ireland as a Whig politician. He contested the Irish UK parliament constituency of Coleraine at the 1831 and 1832 general elections.

In 1831 the sitting member was Sir John William Head Brydges, opposed to the parliamentary reform Bill; Copeland stood as a Protestant reformer, introduced by the local shopkeeper James Gribben. In 1832 Copeland, with continuing support from the Irish Society, was in a contest with Sir John Beresford, 1st Baronet. On both occasions Copeland lost the initial poll, but was declared duly elected on petition. In 1834, as a dissident Whig, he supported for a time the Derby Dilly, but ultimately gave his vote to Lord John Russell.

In the 1835 general election Copeland was re-elected MP for Coleraine, defeating Henry Richardson, by a majority of five. He sat for the borough until 1837.

Copeland then contested the Stoke-upon-Trent constituency in England, as a Conservative candidate. He sat for that seat between 1837 and 1852 (when he was defeated) and again from 1857 until he retired in 1865. He had a period as a Peelite, and voted for the repeal of the Corn Laws, but after 1850 he was a Conservative follower of Lord Stanley (from 1851 the Earl of Derby).

== Family ==
The family claimed descent from John of Copeland, also referred to as John de Coupland, who in 1346 captured King David II of Scotland at the Battle of Neville's Cross.

Copeland married in 1826 Sarah Yates. The couple had ten children, of whom a daughter and four sons survived their father. The sons were William Fowler Mountford Copeland (1828–1908), Edward Capper Copeland (1835–1875), Alfred James Copeland (1837–1921), and Richard Pirie Copeland (1841–1913).

His cousin, William Copeland Astbury, wrote about William Taylor Copeland, the family, and the Copeland Spode business in his diaries, 1831–1848.

== Legacy ==
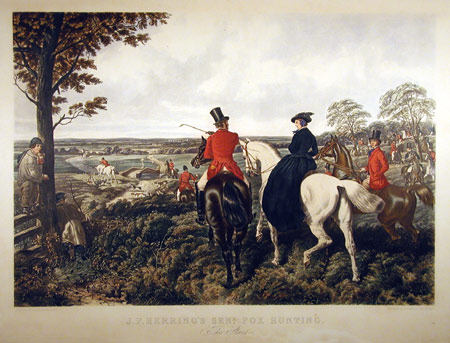
J. F. Herring. The Hunt, initial painting in a series commissioned by W. T. Copeland

During the 1830s, the noted sporting artist John Frederick Herring Sr., then living in Camberwell, was given financial support by Copeland to clear debts. Herring produced paintings for Copeland, and some were used to decorate porcelain collections.

== See also ==
- William Henry Goss
- John Frederick Herring Sr.
- Spode

Parliament of the United Kingdom
| Preceded by Sir John William Head Brydges | Member of Parliament for Coleraine; 1831–1832 | Succeeded by Sir John Poer Beresford, Bt |
| Preceded by Sir John Poo Beresford, Bt | Member of Parliament for Coleraine; 1833–1837 | Succeeded by Edward Litton |
| Preceded by John Davenport; Hon. George Anson | Member of Parliament for Stoke-upon-Trent; 1837–1852; With: John Davenport 1837–1841; John Lewis Ricardo 1841–1852 | Succeeded by John Lewis Ricardo; Hon. Frederick Leveson-Gower |
| Preceded by John Lewis Ricardo; Hon. Frederick Leveson-Gower | Member of Parliament for Stoke-upon-Trent; 1857–1865; With: John Lewis Ricardo 1857–1862; Henry Riversdale Grenfell 1862–1865 | Succeeded by Henry Riversdale Grenfell; Alexander Beresford Hope |
