= Riversley Park =

Park in Nuneaton, Warwickshire, England

Coordinates: 52.519546°N 1.465579°W

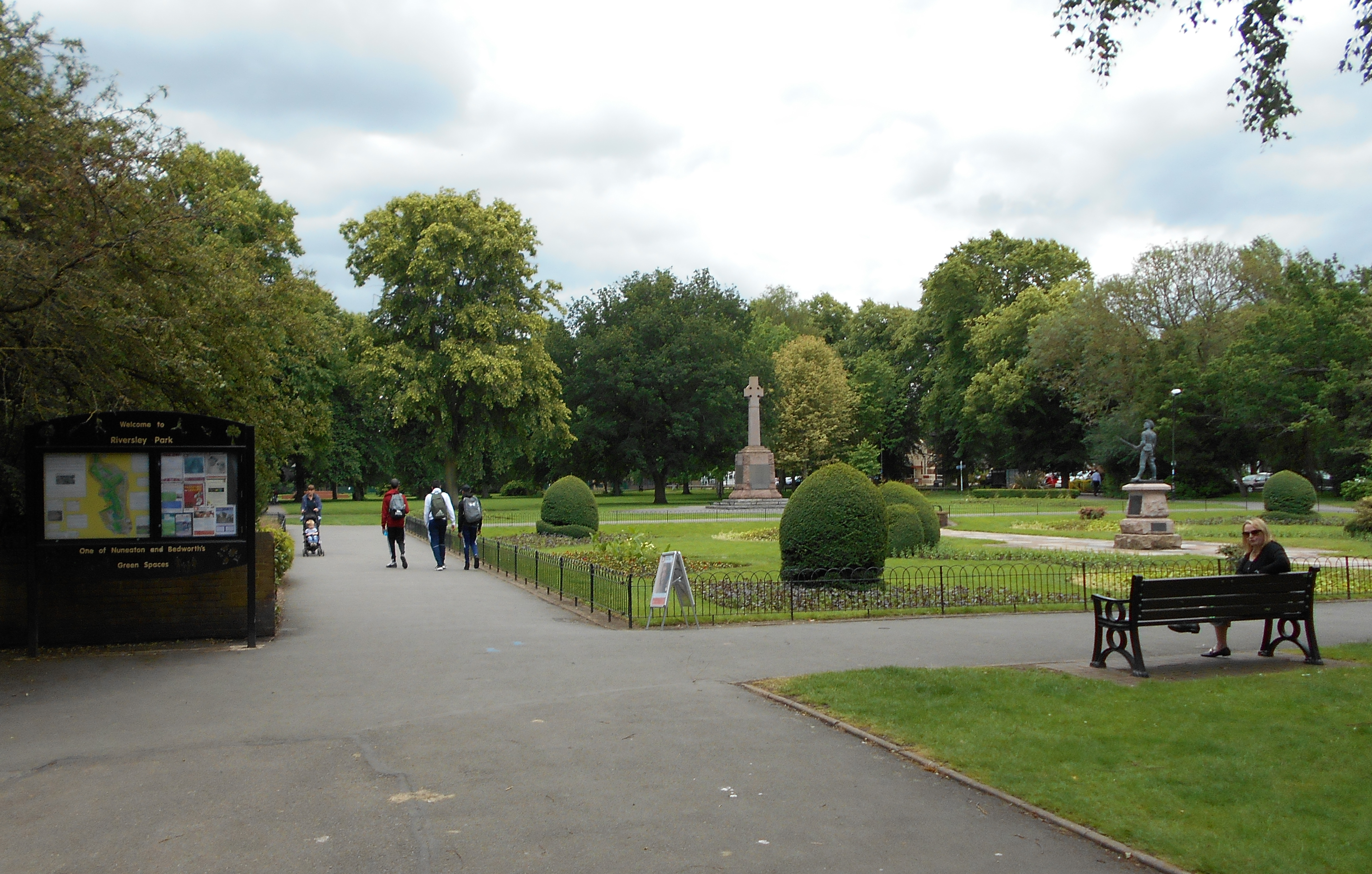
Riversley Park, looking south

Riversley Park is an urban park in Nuneaton, Warwickshire, England, which covers an area of 13 acres (5.3 hectares) and is located immediately to the south of the town centre, with the River Anker flowing through it.

== History ==
The park was opened on 6 July 1907 on land donated by a local benefactor Edward Melly (1857–1941), and was named after Melly's family home in Liverpool.

== Features ==
A 2003 artwork, Gold Belt, by Alisha Miller, is located in a walkway underneath Vicarage Road bridge, which links the park to the George Eliot Memorial Gardens.

=== Museum and art gallery ===
Edward Melly also donated £600 towards the construction of the Nuneaton Museum & Art Gallery in the park, which was begun in 1914, and was completed in 1917.

=== War memorials ===
Within the park is a memorial to soldiers killed in the Boer War (1899–1902) which consists of a bronze statue of a soldier on a granite plinth. This was first created in 1905, and was originally located in Bond Gate in the town centre, but was moved to the park in 1967. In 2006 the original statue was stolen, and it was replaced by an identical one in 2008. The memorial is grade II listed.

South of this there is also a war memorial which was first erected in 1920 to commemorate soldiers who were lost in the First World War, with a later dedication to those lost in the Second World War. The memorial consists of a granite Celtic Cross, which is also grade II listed.

=== Play area ===
The park also contains a children's play area containing a pyramid tower, climbing frames, slides and a water feature. The current play area was opened in 2010, replacing an earlier one, and was named in honour of Louis Carter, a local soldier who was killed in Afghanistan at the age of 18 in 2009.

=== Junior parkrun ===
Each Sunday morning at 9am a free, fully marshalled, timed two kilometre run/walk, open to children aged 4-14, takes place in the park, starting near the bandstand.

== Gallery ==
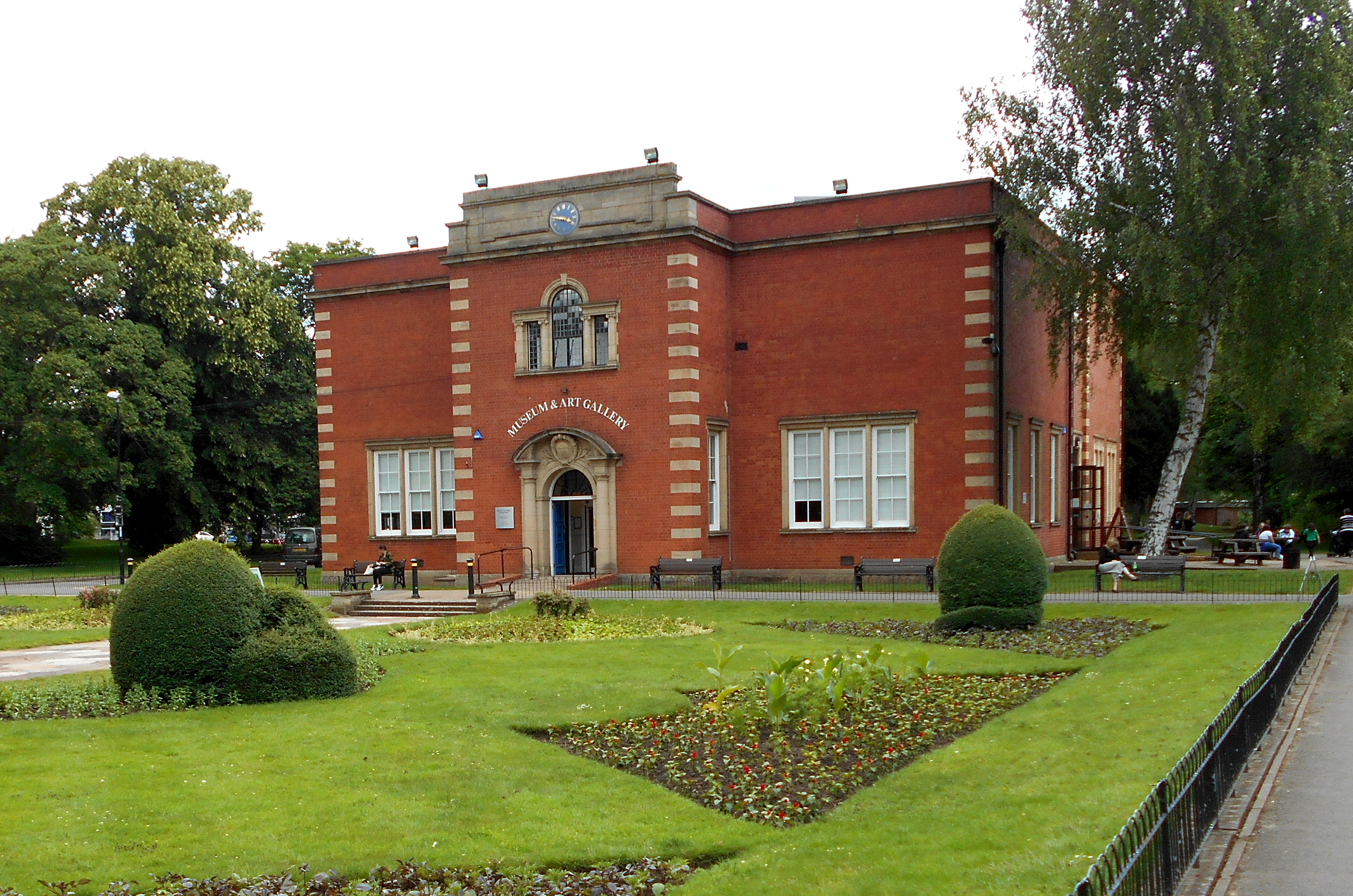
Nuneaton Museum and Art Gallery

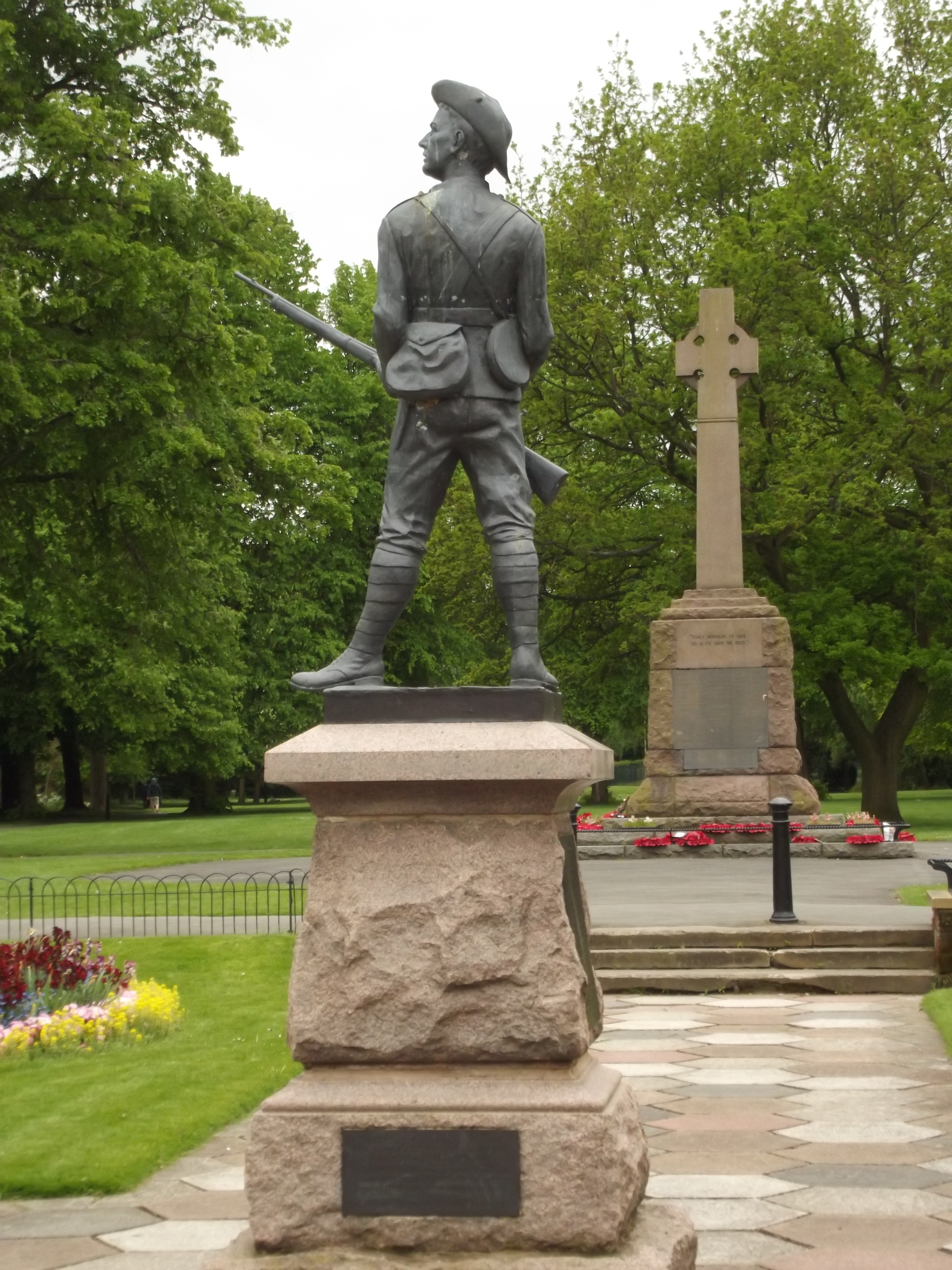
Boer War memorial statue and war memorial cross.

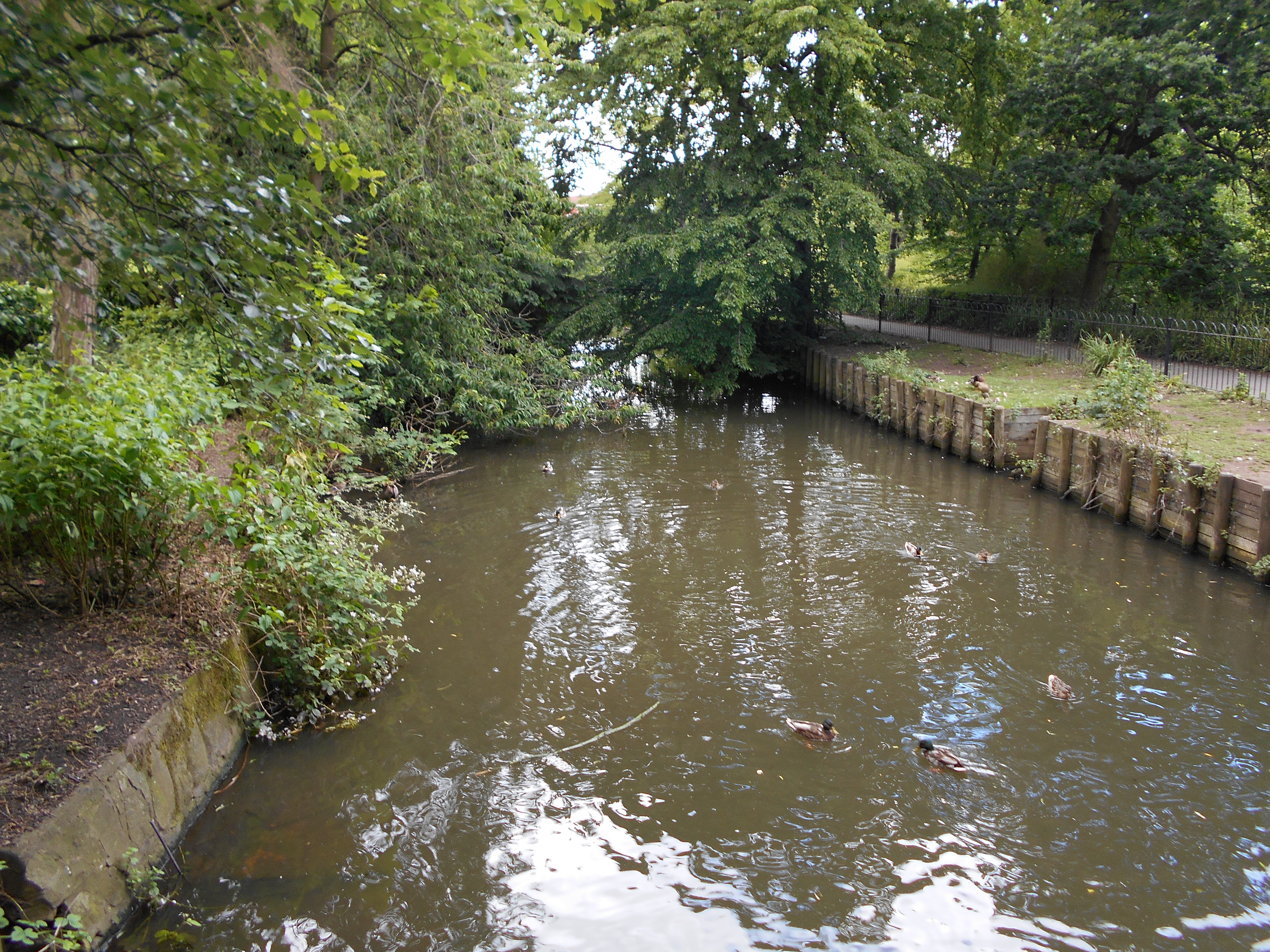
The River Anker, flowing through the park.
