= Arabella Kenealy =

British writer and physician (1859–1938)

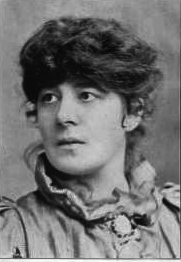
- Dr Kenealy
- Born: 11 April 1859; Portslade
- Died: 18 November 1938 (aged 79); Marylebone
- Writing career
- Subject: race improvement

Arabella Kenealy (11 April 1859 – 18 November 1938) was a British writer, physician, anti-feminist and eugenicist. Kenealy became active in the fight against early feminism, coining the term "feminism is Masculism." As a scientist, she believed sex differences were vital to the continuation of the species and that feminism would lead to abolition of sex differences and dangerous competition between men and women harmful to both women and the long-term viability of the species, an argument she advanced in her book Feminism and Sex-Extinction.

== Life ==
Kenealy was born in Portslade in 1859. She was the second of the eleven children of Elizabeth and Edward Kenealy. Her siblings included Alexander who became the editor of the Daily Mirror and her sister Annesley who was also a writer. Her father became a notorious Queen's Counsel barrister after his unusual behaviour in the Tichborne Case. She became a doctor at the London School of Medicine for Women after a home education. Kenealy started to practise medicine in 1888 but diphtheria obliged her to give up medicine in 1894.

In 1893 she wrote Dr Janet of Harley Street which was successful. Its lead character is a female physician who adopts a younger woman who is escaping from an unhappy marriage. During 1896-1897 Kenealy wrote a series of stories about Lord Syfret. Syfret was an aristocrat who becomes involved in horrifying, and sometimes supernatural, situations. One of the Syfret tales was a short Gothic story called "A Beautiful Vampire".

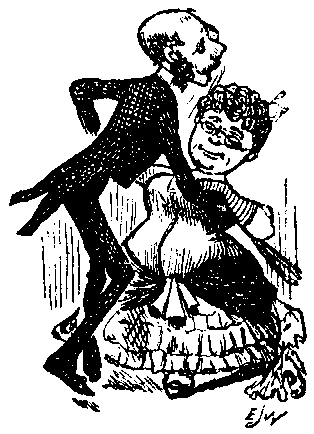
Arabella Kenealy in Punch magazine on 21 November 1891

1895 saw her letter to the British Medical Journal published. In the letter she reported that she had refused treatment to a pregnant woman with syphilis after seeing that she already had a child with congenital syphilis. Kenealy, like other doctors, found the effects of syphilis troubling. This was the first account of a woman doctor advising on the treatment of a sexually transmitted disease. Kenealy was a eugenicist and she asks BMJ readers to advise on whether failing to assist the "birth of such a child as laid its dull misshapen head against my knee that morning" was a good course of action. Her question drew mixed responses and some medical men attacked her approach.

Her book Feminism and Sex Extinction (1920) focused on what she perceived as the harmful effects of the women's rights movement.

Kenealy was intrigued by the effect that the Earth's rotation might have on evolution. Her 1934 book explained "the phenomenon of sex: its origin and development and its significance in the evolutionary process." She believed that people from the northern hemisphere were more male. Moreover, she wrote that every part of the cosmos had male and female aspects; this included people who had more maleness on the right side of their bodies. Women were told to take exercise but they were warned that too much exercise could make women's bodies to lose their natural abilities to be the "mother of men".

Men were also criticised by Kenealy for spending too much time dancing. She considered that they should spend more time thinking about marriage. This view was parodied in the magazine Punch.

Kenealy was an anti-vivisectionist.

== Death and legacy ==
She died in Marylebone in 1938 and was buried at St Helen's Church, Hangleton.

Kenealy was one of the people chosen by Martin Gardner in his book Fads and Fallacies in the Name of Science.

== Selected publications ==
- Woman and the Shadow: A Novel (1898)
- The Failure of Vivisection and the Future of Medical Research (1909)
- The Whips of Time (1909)
- Feminism and Sex-Extinction (1920)
