= Alfred Walton =

British politician (1816–1883)

Alfred Armstrong Walton (1816 – 7 May 1883) was one of the lesser-known British Radical politicians of working-class origin in the mid-Victorian era. He was a prolific author of newspaper contributions on most political and social questions of his time, with a particular interest in land and parliamentary reform.

== Early activity ==
Walton worked as a stonemason and builder, and joined the Operative Masons' Society. He became a supporter of Robert Owen, and was active in the Chartist movement in the late 1840s. He joined the National Association of United Trades, and when he started to advocate a scheme for home colonisation (1848–49).

He expanded on the latter interest in his most important work, the "History of the Landed Tenures of Great Britain and Ireland from the Norman Conquest to the present time" which was published in 1865. With this book, which was quoted by Karl Marx in vol. III of 'Capital', he emerged as one of the most vocal spokesmen for the issue of land nationalisation.

== Welsh Based protagonist ==
In the 1860s, he also became a protagonist of the reform campaign. He did so from Brecon in South Wales where he had moved at the beginning of the decade. His radical ideas made him join several important democratic societies, such as the International Working Men's Association (IWMA, First International), the Reform League and several cooperative building schemes. He also tried several times to be elected a member of Parliament, first for Brecon, then for Stoke-on-Trent in the Potteries. However, due to local political circumstances, he failed in each attempt.

== Latter Years ==
In the 1870s he moved to London, where he spent his last years less involved in radical campaigns but still writing pamphlets and contributions to newspapers.
