= Robert Heath (MP for Stoke-upon-Trent) =

British Conservative Party politician

Robert Heath MP

Member of Parliament for Stoke-upon-Trent
- In office 7 February 1874 – 7 April 1880 Serving with Edward Kenealy (1875–1880); George Melly (1874–1875)
- Preceded by: George Melly; William Sargeant Roden
- Succeeded by: William Woodall; Henry Broadhurst

Personal details
- Born: 14 August 1816
- Died: 16 April 1893 (aged 76)
- Party: Conservative

Robert Heath (14 August 1816 – 7 October 1893) was a British Conservative Party politician.

Heath was educated at Dr Magnus's School at Etruria Hall before leaving education at age 14 and joining his father's firm, Clough Hall Collieries and Ironworks. on his father's death in 1849, he became manager. However, in 1854 he resigned this role and joined the development of Silverdale and Kunthon Forges, under Stainer & Heath. He retired from active business in 1886.

Heath was elected MP for Stoke-upon-Trent in 1874, but lost the seat in 1880.

Parliament of the United Kingdom
Preceded by George Melly; William Sargeant Roden	Member of Parliament for Stoke-upon-Trent; 1874–1880; With: Edward Kenealy (1875–1880); George Melly (1874–1875)	Succeeded by William Woodall; Henry Broadhurst
