= Orthogonius mellyi =

Scientific classification
- Domain: Eukaryota
- Kingdom: Animalia
- Phylum: Arthropoda
- Class: Insecta
- Order: Coleoptera
- Suborder: Adephaga
- Family: Carabidae
- Genus: Orthogonius
- Species: O. mellyi

Binomial name
- Orthogonius mellyi (Chaudoir, 1850)

Species of beetle

Orthogonius mellyi is a species of ground beetle in the subfamily Orthogoniinae. It was described by Maximilien Chaudoir in 1850 and named after the collector Andre Melly.
