= Stoke-upon-Trent (constituency) =

Parliamentary constituency in the United Kingdom, 1885–1918

- Former borough constituency for the House of Commons

1832–1918
- Seats: two (1832–1885); one (1885–1918)
- Replaced by: Stoke-on-Trent, Stoke; Stoke-on-Trent, Hanley; Stoke-on-Trent, Burslem

Stoke-upon-Trent was a parliamentary borough in Staffordshire, which elected two Members of Parliament (MPs) to the House of Commons from 1832 until 1885, and then one member from 1885 until 1918, when the borough was enlarged, renamed Stoke-on-Trent, and split into three single-member constituencies.

== History ==
Stoke-upon-Trent was established as a borough by the Great Reform Act 1832 to represent the Staffordshire Potteries, one of the most populous urban areas in England which had previously had no separate representation. The provisional contents, confirmed by the Parliamentary Boundaries Act 1832, formed a contiguous area comprising the townships of Tunstall, Burslem, Hanley, Shelton, Penkhull with Boothen (containing the town of Stoke-upon-Trent), Lane End, Longton, Fenton Vivian, and Fenton Culvert; hamlet of Sneyd; and vill of Rushton. At the time of the Reform Act 1832 the area had a population just over 50,000 (of whom 37,220 were in Stoke parish). In 1867 the boundaries were extended somewhat, to bring in a part of Burslem which had previously been excluded.

In further boundary changes implemented at the 1885 general election, the borough was split into two single-member constituencies, the northern part becoming a separate Hanley borough while the southern part (containing Longton and Fenton as well as Stoke itself) retained the Stoke-upon-Trent name; the new constituency had a population just under 100,000 by the time of the First World War. The industrial interests predominated, with the bulk of the voters being pottery workers or miners, although Stoke was a partly middle-class town; at first an apparently safe Liberal seat, it fell narrowly to the Unionists in both 1895 and 1900, perhaps partly because of discord between miners and potters within the local Liberal party. From 1906 it was held by John Ward as a Lib-Lab MP hostile to the Labour Party, who being from the Navvies' Union could defuse the mutual jealousies of the potters and miners.

By 1918, the pottery towns had been united for municipal purposes in a single Stoke-on-Trent county borough, and the parliamentary boundary changes which came into effect at that year's general election established a parliamentary borough of the same name to replace Stoke-upon-Trent and Hanley, divided into three constituencies: Stoke-on-Trent, Stoke; Stoke-on-Trent, Hanley; and Stoke-on-Trent, Burslem.

== Members of Parliament ==
=== 1832–1885 ===
Year	First member	First party	Second member	Second party
1832	Josiah Wedgwood II	Whig	John Davenport	Tory
1834	Josiah Wedgwood II	Whig	John Davenport	Conservative
1835	Richard Edensor Heathcote	Whig	John Davenport	Conservative
1836	Hon. George Anson	Whig	John Davenport	Conservative
1837	William Taylor Copeland	Conservative	John Davenport	Conservative
1841	William Taylor Copeland	Conservative	John Lewis Ricardo	Whig
1852	Hon. Frederick Leveson-Gower	Whig	John Lewis Ricardo	Whig
1857	William Taylor Copeland	Conservative	John Lewis Ricardo	Whig
1859	William Taylor Copeland	Conservative	John Lewis Ricardo	Liberal
1862	William Taylor Copeland	Conservative	Henry Grenfell	Liberal
1865	Alexander Beresford Hope	Conservative	Henry Grenfell	Liberal
February 1868	George Melly	Liberal	Henry Grenfell	Liberal
November 1868	George Melly	Liberal	William Sargeant Roden	Liberal
1874	George Melly	Liberal	Robert Heath	Conservative
1875	Edward Kenealy	Independent	Robert Heath	Conservative
1880	William Woodall	Liberal	Henry Broadhurst	Liberal-Labour
1885	constituency divided into single-member constituencies, see also Hanley			

=== 1885–1918 ===
Year	Member	Whip
1885	William Leatham Bright	Liberal
1890	George Leveson-Gower	Liberal
1895	Douglas Coghill	Liberal Unionist
1900	Douglas Coghill	Conservative
1906	John Ward	Liberal
1918	constituency abolished	

== Election results ==
=== Elections in the 1830s ===
General election 1832: Stoke-upon-Trent (2 seats)
Party	Candidate	Votes	%
Whig	Josiah Wedgwood	822	36.0
Tory	John Davenport	625	27.4
Whig	Richard Edensor Heathcote	588	25.8
Radical	George Miles Mason	247	10.8
Turnout		1,245	92.3
Registered electors		1,349	
Majority		197	8.6
Whig win (new seat)			
Majority		37	1.6
Tory win (new seat)			

General election 1835: Stoke-upon-Trent (2 seats)
Party	Candidate	Votes	%
Conservative	John Davenport	Unopposed	
Whig	Richard Edensor Heathcote	Unopposed	
Registered electors		1,266	
Conservative hold			
Whig hold			

Heathcote resigned, causing a by-election.

By-election, 15 February 1836: Stoke-upon-Trent
Party	Candidate	Votes	%
Whig	George Anson	Unopposed	
Whig hold			

General election 1837: Stoke-upon-Trent (2 seats)
Party	Candidate	Votes	%
Conservative	William Taylor Copeland	683	29.8
Conservative	John Davenport	670	29.2
Radical	Matthew Bridges	472	20.6
Whig	Francis Brinsley Sheridan	469	20.4
Majority		198	8.6
Turnout		1,161	78.7
Registered electors		1,475	
Conservative hold			
Conservative gain from Whig			

=== Elections in the 1840s ===
General election 1841: Stoke-upon-Trent (2 seats)
Party	Candidate	Votes	%	±%
Whig	John Lewis Ricardo	870	44.3	+23.9
Conservative	William Taylor Copeland	606	30.9	+1.1
Conservative	Frederick Dudley Ryder	486	24.8	−4.4
Majority		384	19.5	N/A
Turnout		981 (est)	58.3 (est)	c. −20.4
Registered electors		1,682		
Whig gain from Conservative		Swing	+13.6	
Conservative hold		Swing	−5.4	

General election 1847: Stoke-upon-Trent (2 seats)
Party	Candidate	Votes	%	±%
Whig	John Lewis Ricardo	954	44.2	−0.1
Conservative	William Taylor Copeland	819	38.0	+7.1
Whig	Thomas Piers Healey	384	17.8	N/A
Turnout		1,079 (est)	63.6 (est)	+5.3
Registered electors		1,695		
Majority		135	6.2	−7.2
Whig hold		Swing	−3.6	
Majority		435	20.2	
Conservative hold		Swing	+3.6	

=== Elections in the 1850s ===
General election 1852: Stoke-upon-Trent (2 seats)
Party	Candidate	Votes	%	±%
Whig	John Lewis Ricardo	921	36.3	−7.9
Whig	Frederick Leveson-Gower	848	33.4	+15.6
Conservative	William Taylor Copeland	769	30.3	−7.7
Majority		79	3.1	N/A
Turnout		1,654 (est)	93.0 (est)	+29.4
Registered electors		3,189		
Whig hold		Swing	−2.0	
Whig gain from Conservative		Swing	+9.7	

General election 1857: Stoke-upon-Trent (2 seats)
Party	Candidate	Votes	%	±%
Conservative	William Taylor Copeland	1,261	44.3	+14.0
Whig	John Lewis Ricardo	822	28.9	−7.4
Whig	Frederick Leveson-Gower	764	26.8	−6.6
Majority		497	17.5	N/A
Turnout		2,054 (est)	97.1 (est)	+4.1
Registered electors		2,115		
Conservative gain from Whig		Swing	+14.0	
Whig hold		Swing	−7.2	

General election 1859: Stoke-upon-Trent (2 seats)
Party	Candidate	Votes	%	±%
Liberal	John Lewis Ricardo	1,258	43.4	+14.5
Conservative	William Taylor Copeland	1,074	37.0	−7.3
Liberal	Samuel Pope	569	19.6	−7.2
Turnout		1,988 (est)	89.5 (est)	−7.6
Registered electors		2,221		
Majority		184	6.4	
Liberal hold		Swing	+9.1	
Majority		505	17.4	−0.1
Conservative hold		Swing	−7.3	

=== Elections in the 1860s ===
Ricardo's death caused a by-election.

By-election, 23 September 1862: Stoke-upon-Trent
Party	Candidate	Votes	%	±%
Liberal	Henry Grenfell	1,089	53.4	+10.0
Conservative	Alexander Beresford Hope	918	45.0	+8.0
Liberal	George Melly	32	1.6	−18.0
Majority		171	8.4	+2.0
Turnout		2,039	82.9	−6.6
Registered electors		2,461		
Liberal hold		Swing	+3.0	

General election 1865: Stoke-upon-Trent (2 seats)
Party	Candidate	Votes	%	±%
Conservative	Alexander Beresford Hope	1,463	35.6	−1.4
Liberal	Henry Grenfell	1,373	33.4	−10.0
Liberal	George Melly	1,277	31.0	+11.4
Majority		90	2.2	−15.2
Turnout		2,788 (est)	87.4 (est)	−2.1
Registered electors		3,189		
Conservative hold		Swing	−1.4	
Liberal hold		Swing	−4.3	

Beresford Hope resigned in order to contest a by-election at Cambridge University, causing a by-election.

By-election, 20 February 1868: Stoke-upon-Trent
Party	Candidate	Votes	%	±%
Liberal	George Melly	1,489	51.2	−13.2
Conservative	Colin Minton Campbell	1,420	48.8	+13.2
Majority		69	2.4	N/A
Turnout		2,909	91.2	+3.8
Registered electors		3,189		
Liberal gain from Conservative		Swing	−13.2	

General election 1868: Stoke-upon-Trent (2 seats)
Party	Candidate	Votes	%	±%
Liberal	George Melly	Unopposed		
Liberal	William Sargeant Roden	Unopposed		
Registered electors		16,199		
Liberal hold				
Liberal gain from Conservative				

=== Elections in the 1870s ===
General election 1874: Stoke-upon-Trent (2 seats)
Party	Candidate	Votes	%	±%
Liberal	George Melly	6,700	28.6	N/A
Conservative	Robert Heath	6,180	26.4	New
Liberal	William Sargeant Roden	5,369	22.9	N/A
Lib-Lab	Alfred Walton	5,198	22.2	N/A
Turnout		17,413 (est)	91.0 (est)	N/A
Registered electors		19,129		
Majority		520	2.2	N/A
Liberal hold		Swing	N/A	
Majority		811	3.5	N/A
Conservative gain from Liberal		Swing	N/A	

Melly resigned, causing a by-election.

By-election, 18 Feb 1875: Stoke-upon-Trent (1 seat)
Party	Candidate	Votes	%	±%
Independent	Edward Kenealy	6,110	43.1	New
Lib-Lab	Alfred Walton	4,168	29.4	+7.2
Conservative	Harry Davenport	3,901	27.5	+1.1
Majority		1,942	13.7	N/A
Turnout		14,179	72.5	−18.5
Registered electors		19,548		
Independent gain from Liberal		Swing		

=== Elections in the 1880s ===
General election 1880: Stoke-upon-Trent (2 seats)
Party	Candidate	Votes	%	±%
Liberal	William Woodall	12,130	40.8	−10.7
Lib-Lab	Henry Broadhurst	11,379	38.3	+16.1
Conservative	Robert Heath	5,126	17.2	−9.2
Independent	Edward Kenealy	1,091	3.7	N/A
Majority		6,253	21.1	N/A
Turnout		14,863 (est)	74.4 (est)	−16.6
Registered electors		19,976		
Liberal hold		Swing	−7.2	
Lib-Lab gain from Conservative		Swing	+12.7	

General election 1885: Stoke-upon-Trent
Party	Candidate	Votes	%	±%
Liberal	William Leatham Bright	4,790	63.1	−16.0
Conservative	Haden Corser	2,800	36.9	+19.7
Majority		1,990	26.2	+5.1
Turnout		7,590	82.4	+8.0 (est)
Registered electors		9,213		
Liberal hold		Swing	−17.9	

General election 1886: Stoke-upon-Trent
Party	Candidate	Votes	%	±%
Liberal	William Leatham Bright	3,255	60.9	−2.2
Conservative	Haden Corser	2,093	39.1	+2.2
Majority		1,162	21.8	−4.4
Turnout		5,348	58.0	−24.4
Registered electors		9,213		
Liberal hold		Swing	-2.2	

=== Elections in the 1890s ===
By-election 14 Mar 1890: Stoke-upon-Trent
Party	Candidate	Votes	%	±%
Liberal	George Leveson-Gower	4,157	58.7	−2.2
Liberal Unionist	William Shepherd Allen	2,926	41.3	+2.2
Majority		1,231	17.4	−4.4
Turnout		7,083	73.4	+15.4
Registered electors		9,649		
Liberal hold		Swing	−2.2	

- Caused by Bright's resignation.

General election 1892: Stoke-upon-Trent
Party	Candidate	Votes	%	±%
Liberal	George Leveson-Gower	4,629	61.9	+1.0
Conservative	S Waters	2,846	38.1	−1.0
Majority		1,783	23.8	+2.0
Turnout		7,475	72.0	+14.0
Registered electors		10,380		
Liberal hold		Swing	+1.0	

Leveson-Gower was appointed Comptroller of the Household, requiring a by-election.

By-election 25 Aug 1892: Stoke-upon-Trent
Party	Candidate	Votes	%	±%
Liberal	George Leveson-Gower	Unopposed		
Liberal hold				

Coghill

General election 1895: Stoke-upon-Trent
Party	Candidate	Votes	%	±%
Liberal Unionist	Douglas Coghill	4,396	51.2	+13.1
Liberal	George Leveson-Gower	4,196	48.8	−13.1
Majority		200	2.4	N/A
Turnout		8,592	77.4	+5.4
Registered electors		11,107		
Liberal Unionist gain from Liberal		Swing	+13.1	

=== Elections in the 1900s ===
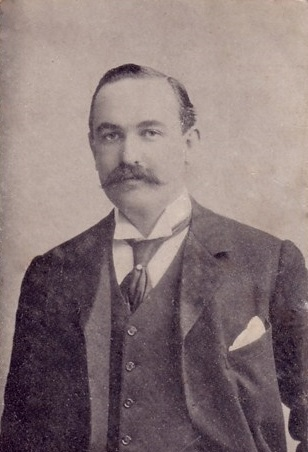
Godfrey Baring

General election 1900: Stoke-upon-Trent
Party	Candidate	Votes	%	±%
Conservative	Douglas Coghill	4,932	51.0	−0.2
Liberal	Godfrey Baring	4,732	49.0	+0.2
Majority		200	2.0	−0.4
Turnout		9,664	73.9	−3.5
Registered electors		13,074		
Conservative hold		Swing	−0.2	

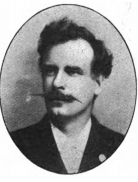
John Ward

General election 1906: Stoke-upon-Trent
Party	Candidate	Votes	%	±%
Lib-Lab	John Ward	7,660	64.1	+15.1
Conservative	Douglas Coghill	4,288	35.9	−15.1
Majority		3,372	28.2	N/A
Turnout		11,948	84.8	+10.9
Registered electors		14,091		
Lib-Lab gain from Conservative		Swing	+15.1	

=== Elections in the 1910s ===
Ward

General election January 1910: Stoke-upon-Trent
Party	Candidate	Votes	%	±%
Lib-Lab	John Ward	7,688	57.4	−6.7
Conservative	David Hope Kid	5,697	42.6	+6.7
Majority		1,991	14.8	−13.4
Turnout		13,385	88.8	+4.0
Registered electors		15,079		
Lib-Lab hold		Swing	−6.7	

General election December 1910: Stoke-upon-Trent
Party	Candidate	Votes	%	±%
Lib-Lab	John Ward	7,049	58.2	+0.8
Conservative	Samuel Joyce Thomas	5,062	41.8	−0.8
Majority		1,987	16.4	+1.6
Turnout		12,111	80.3	−8.5
Registered electors		15,079		
Lib-Lab hold		Swing	+0.8	

General Election 1914–15:

Another General Election was required to take place before the end of 1915. The political parties had been making preparations for an election to take place and by July 1914, the following candidates had been selected;

- Liberal-Labour: John Ward
- Unionist: Samuel Joyce Thomas
