= William Sargeant Roden =

William Sargeant Roden (24 November 1829 – 25 April 1882) was an English iron master and Liberal politician who was active in local government and sat in the House of Commons from 1868 to 1874.

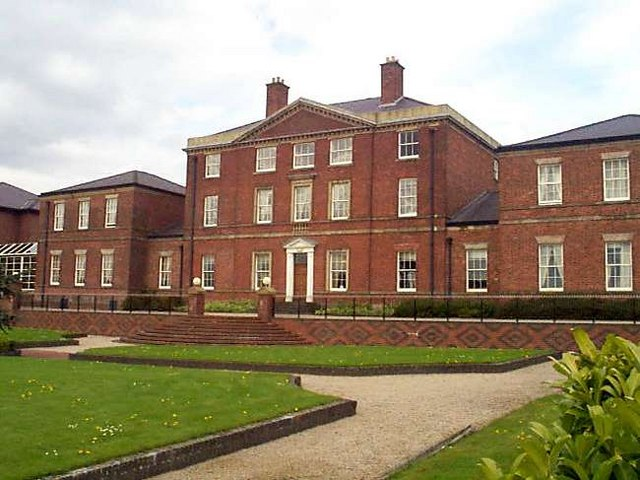
Etruria Hall

Roden was the son of William Roden of Wolverhampton, and his wife Anne Brown, daughter of Richard Brown. He was educated at Bristol, and became an iron Master in North Staffordshire, and chairman of the Manchester, Buxton, Matlock and Midlands Junction Railway. He was a J.P. and Deputy Lieutenant for Staffordshire and a J.P, for Monmouth. He was Honorary Colonel of the Shropshire Artillery Volunteers. Roden was mayor of Hanley, Staffordshire from 1866 to 1868 and was living at Etruria Hall.

At the 1868 general election Roden was elected unopposed as a Member of Parliament (MP) for Stoke-upon-Trent. He held the seat until the 1874 general election, when he was defeated by the Conservative Party candidate Robert Heath.

Roden died at the age of 52.

Roden married Theodora Butcher, daughter of Samuel Butcher of Sheffield. She died in February 1867.

Parliament of the United Kingdom
Preceded by Henry Grenfell; George Melly	Member of Parliament for Stoke-upon-Trent; 1868 – 1874; With: George Melly	Succeeded by Robert Heath; George Melly
