= Charles Pierre Melly =

British philanthropist

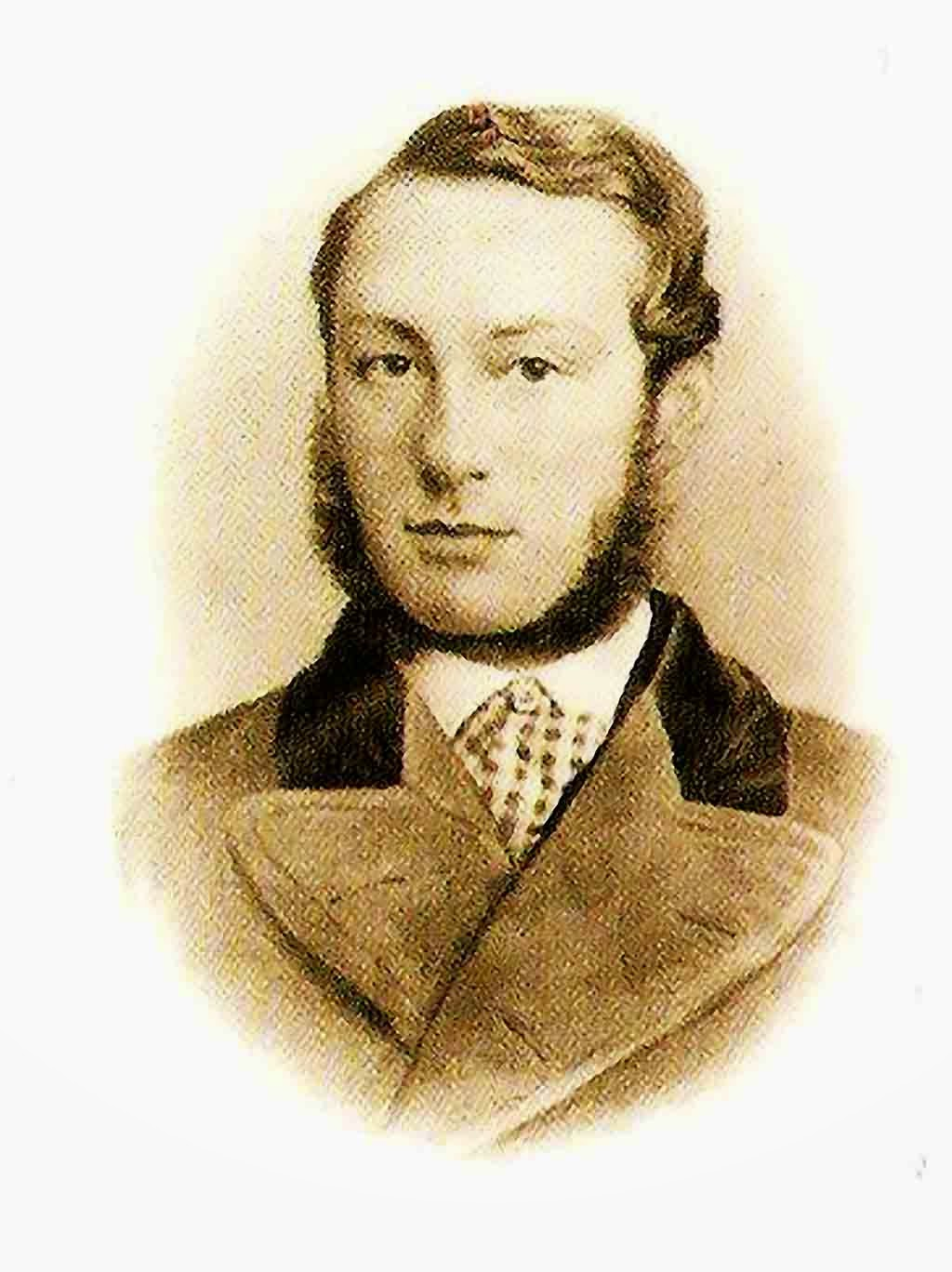
- Born: May 25, 1829; Tuebrook, now Liverpool, England
- Died: November 10, 1888 (aged 59)
- Spouse: Louise Forget

Charles Pierre Melly (born Tuebrook, now Liverpool; 25 May 1829 – 10 November 1888) was a cotton merchant in the company of Melly, Forget & Co. and philanthropist.

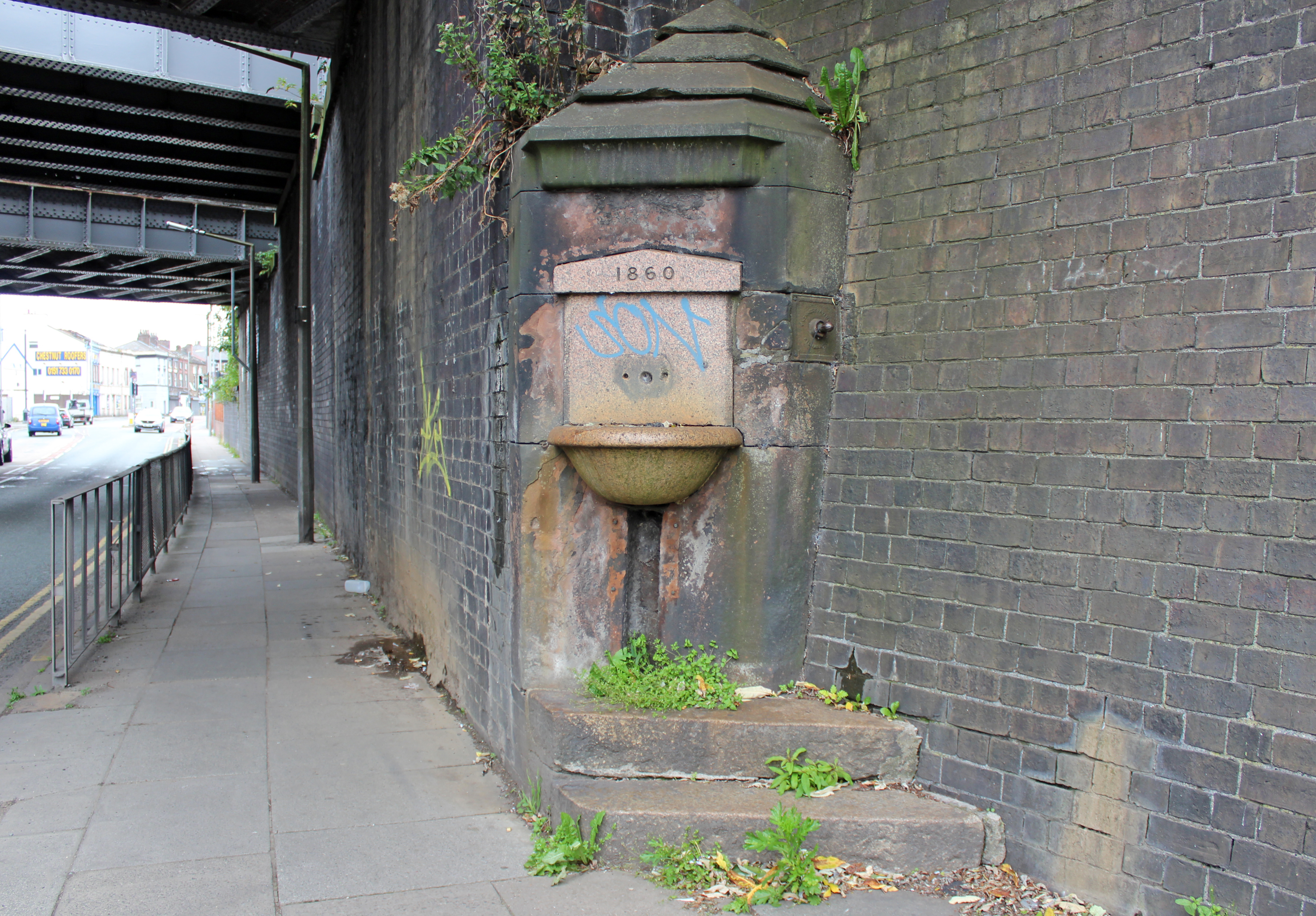
The drinking fountain on Picton Road

Melly was the son of Swiss-born cotton merchant Andre Melly and the brother of the liberal MP George Melly. He was well known for his drinking fountains, which he created to make drinking water available to the public. Most of these drinking fountains are to be found in Liverpool, but some can be found as far afield as Southampton. Some early fountains, particularly around the docks, were in cast iron. The later, and best known, were in Aberdeen pink granite, to a standard design.

In January 1858 Melly applied to purchase a piece of corporation land for the purpose of transforming it into a free recreative ground, and fitting it up with a gymnasium and other appliances for the use of the local working-class people. With John Hulley, he founded the Liverpool Athletic Club at the Rotunda Gymnasium, Bold Street, Liverpool, and was its first president.

== Personal life ==
In 1854, Melly married his cousin, Louise Forget, (1825–1899) in Geneva. They made their home at Riversley, his parents' house in Mossley Hill, Liverpool, and had seven sons and a daughter including the noted philanthropist Edward Melly. Their youngest son, Henry Greg Melly (born 1869), was a pioneer aviator and founder of the Liverpool Aviation School. Melly was suffering from depression towards the end of his life and committed suicide.
