= Abu Hamad District =

Abu Hamad
- District
- Country: Sudan
- State: River Nile

Abu Hamad is a district of River Nile state, Sudan.
