= Nebria mellyi =

Scientific classification
- Domain: Eukaryota
- Kingdom: Animalia
- Phylum: Arthropoda
- Class: Insecta
- Order: Coleoptera
- Suborder: Adephaga
- Family: Carabidae
- Genus: Nebria
- Subgenus: Nebria (Catonebria)
- Species: N. mellyi

Binomial name
- Nebria mellyi Gebler, 1847

Species of beetle

Nebria mellyi is a species of ground beetle in the Nebriinae subfamily that is endemic to Russia.
