= Florence Melly =

- Born: Florence Elizabeth Melly; 13 October 1856; Liverpool, England
- Died: 16 September 1928 (aged 71); Rosedale Abbey, England
- Occupation: politician
- Known for: improving education
- Parent: Sarah Elizabeth Bright

Florence Elizabeth Melly (13 October 1856 – 16 September 1928) was a British educationist in Liverpool. She was one of only two women elected to Liverpool's school board. She was known for her self sacrifice and a school bears her name.

== Life ==
Melly was born in Liverpool. Her parents were Ellen Maria (born Greg) and George Melly. She was "of independent means" having grandparents who were mill owners and agents for the Egyptian government. Florence inherited an interest in education from her father and she joined Liverpool's school board which was a role open to women interested in politics. She was co-opted onto the board with several abstentions as she replaced the popular Ann Jane Davies, who died of pneumonia, in 1898. She would cycle to elementary schools to fulfil the school board's role and she especially included in her bailiwick education for children with disabilities. Melly and Davies were the only women serving on the school board and both were noted for the effort they put into the role. Melly was said to serve "because" and not "despite her sex" although she showed "habitual modesty".

Melly stood for election to the board following her initial co-option and she came second in 1900 behind the male Protestant candidate who had 52,909 votes.

In 1901 she took a particular interest into an enquiry for the City Council into child labour despite not actually serving on the committee. She took an interest in the role of girls as she wanted to ensure that they were not involved in trading on the street as she worried about the "depravity", but she made no objection to girls working after school in other employments, domestic or otherwise.

== Death and legacy ==
Melly died in a lodge house in the village of Rosedale Abbey. A school known as an "open air school" was named for her. The school in Walton was called "open air" because its classrooms had large windows and verandahs facing a large internal courtyard. The name had been used again when a new school was opened in Liverpool. Melly's great nephew was the jazz musician and art historian George Melly.
