= George Melly (MP) =

English merchant, shipowner and politician

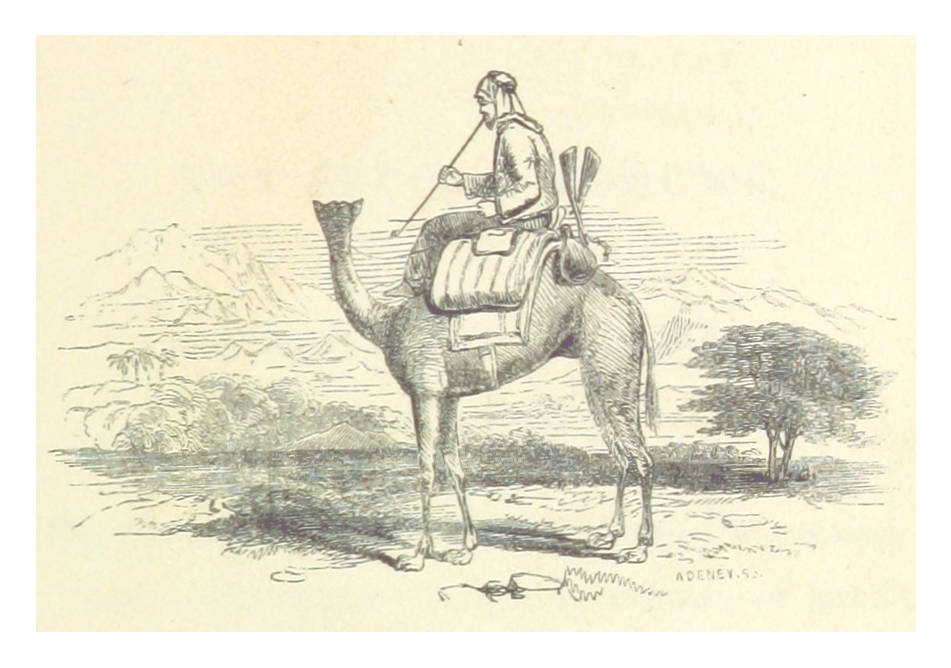
Melly in Arabian costume

George Melly (20 August 1830 – 27 February 1894) was an English merchant and shipowner and a Liberal politician who sat in the House of Commons from 1868 to 1875.

== Life ==
Melly was the son of Andre Melly and his wife Ellen Greg, daughter of Samuel Greg of Manchester. He was educated at Rugby School and became a merchant and shipowner. He was a member of the Mersey Docks and Harbour Board, and a director of the Union Marine Insurance Co. He was a J.P. for Liverpool and was major of the 4th Lancashire Artillery Volunteers from 1859 to March 1866. He authored a number of books and pamphlets.

Melly stood unsuccessfully for Parliament at a by-election in April 1862 in Preston, and in Stoke-upon-Trent at the 1865 general election. Melly was elected as a Member of Parliament (MP) for Stoke-upon-Trent at a by-election in February 1868 following the resignation of the Conservative MP Alexander Beresford Hope. He was re-elected at the general election in November 1868, and in 1874, and held the seat until his resignation on 5 February 1875 by taking the Chiltern Hundreds.

Melly died at the age of 63.

Melly married Sarah Elizabeth Mesnard Bright, daughter of Samuel Bright, of Liverpool, in 1852. They had eight children of whom seven survived. Their children included the educationalist Florence Elizabeth Melly who was born in 1856.

He was the ancestor of George Melly, the jazz singer and writer, and Andrée Melly, the actress.

== Publications ==
- Khartoum and the Blue and White Niles
- School Experiences of a Fag
- Compulsory Education
- Reformatory System
- Italy
- Future of the Working Classes

Parliament of the United Kingdom
Preceded by Alexander Beresford Hope; Henry Grenfell	Member of Parliament for Stoke-upon-Trent; 1868 – 1874; With: Henry Grenfell to Nov 1868; William Sargeant Roden Nov 1868–1874; Robert Heath from 1874	Succeeded by Edward Kenealy; Robert Heath
