= 1942 Nuneaton by-election =

UK by-election

The 1942 Nuneaton by-election was a parliamentary by-election held for the British House of Commons constituency of Nuneaton on 9 March 1942. The seat had become vacant when the Labour Member of Parliament Reginald Fletcher was raised to the peerage as Baron Winster. He had held the seat since the 1935 general election.

During World War II, the parties in the war-time coalition government had agreed not to contest by-elections where a seat held by any of their parties fell vacant, so the Labour candidate, Frank Bowles was returned unopposed. He represented the constituency until his resignation in 1965 to allow the election of the Minister of Technology Frank Cousins.

== See also ==
- Nuneaton (UK Parliament constituency)
- Nuneaton
- 1965 Nuneaton by-election
- 1967 Nuneaton by-election
- List of United Kingdom by-elections
