= John Best =

John Best may refer to:

== Politicians ==
- John Best (died 1560), MP for Westminster
- John Best (died 1574), in 1553 MP for Colchester
- John Best (British politician) (1821–1865), British barrister and politician
- John Best (Canadian politician) (1861–1923), Australian-born politician in Canada

== Sports ==
- John Best (basketball) (born 1971), American basketball player
- Johnny Best (boxer), 1940s Australian middleweight boxer
- John Best (soccer) (1940–2014), US/English soccer defender
- John Orr Best (1910–1996), American soccer referee and member of the National Soccer Hall of Fame
- Jack Best (rugby union) (1914–1994), New Zealand rugby union player
- John Best (badminton) (born 1929), English badminton player

== Others ==
- John Best (bishop) (died 1570), Bishop of Carlisle 1560–1570
- John Best (guard captain), 1592–1597 Captain of the Yeomen of the Guard
- John C. Best (1865–1902), Canadian murderer
- John William Best (1912–2000), Royal Air Force pilot
- Johnny Best (1913–2003), American jazz trumpeter
