= Christopher Herzig =

British civil servant

Christopher Herzig (24 October 1926 – 1 September 1993) was a British civil servant. He served as Principal Private Secretary to four cabinet ministers, including Lord Hailsham and Sir Edward Boyle.

Christopher was the son of Leopold Adolf Herzig.

Herzig was involved with Frank Cousins, C. P. Snow, Patrick Blackett and Maurice Dean in setting up the Ministry of Technology in 1964.

== Family life ==
He married Rachel Buxton, the daughter of P. A. Buxton on 19 July 1952. They had five children together.
