= Nuneaton (constituency) =

Parliamentary constituency in the United Kingdom, 1885 onwards

Coordinates: 52.53°N 1.52°W

- County constituency for the House of Commons
- Boundaries since 2010
- Boundary of Nuneaton in West Midlands region
- County: Warwickshire
- Electorate: 70,335 (2023)
- Major settlements: Nuneaton

Current constituency
- Created: 1885
- Member of Parliament: Jodie Gosling (Labour)
- Seats: One
- Created from: North Warwickshire

Nuneaton is a constituency (Note: A county constituency (for the purposes of election expenses and type of returning officer)) in Warwickshire represented in the House of Commons of the UK Parliament since 2024 by Jodie Gosling of the Labour Party. (Note: As with all constituencies, the constituency elects one Member of Parliament (MP) by the first past the post system of election at least every five years.)

== Constituency profile ==
Nuneaton is a constituency in Warwickshire in the West Midlands region of England, covering parts of the Nuneaton and Bedworth and North Warwickshire local government districts. It includes the town of Nuneaton, which has a population of around 94,000, and some small villages to its west.

Nuneaton is a large, historic market town. It was largely developed during the late 19th century as an important industrial centre, especially for silk ribbon weaving and coal mining. Today, many of the town's residents commute to the nearby cities of Birmingham and Coventry. Much of the town is highly-deprived, particularly in the town centre and in the southern and western neighbourhoods like Camp Hill and Hill Top which were developed in the 1950s as council estates. There are some affluent suburbs in the north and east of the town which were built more recently, like Whitestone, Horeston Grange and St Nicolas Park. House prices across the constituency are generally lower than the regional and UK averages.

Residents of Nuneaton have a similar age profile to the rest of the country. They have below-average levels of income but above-average rates of homeownership, and the child poverty rate is in line with the UK-wide figure. Residents have low levels of education and a high proportion work in the health, retail and transport sectors. The percentage claiming unemployment benefits is similar to the rest of the country. White people made up 88% of the population at the 2021 census. Asians, mostly of Indian origin, were the largest ethnic minority group at 8% and made up around a quarter of the population in the town centre.

At the local district council, the town centre is represented by Labour Party councillors whilst the outer neighbourhoods elected Reform UK and Conservative representatives, except some northern suburbs which voted for the Green Party. Most of the town elected Reform UK councillors to the county council. Voters in Nuneaton strongly supported leaving the European Union in the 2016 referendum; an estimated 65% voted in favour of Brexit compared to the UK-wide rate of 52%.

== Boundaries ==
Nuneaton 1885–1918

1885–1918: The Sessional Division of Coventry and part of the Sessional Divisions of Atherstone and Coleshill.

1918–1945: The Municipal Borough of Nuneaton, the Urban District of Bulkington, and the Rural Districts of Atherstone, Coventry, Foleshill, and Nuneaton.

1945–1955: The Municipal Borough of Nuneaton, the Urban District of Bedworth, and the Rural District of Atherstone.

1955–1974: The Municipal Borough of Nuneaton, and the Urban District of Bedworth.

1974–1983: The Municipal Borough of Nuneaton, and the Urban District of Bedworth as altered by the Coventry Order 1965.

1983–2010: The Borough of Nuneaton and Bedworth wards of Abbey, Arbury, Attleborough, Bulkington, Camp Hill, Chilvers Coton, Galley Common, St Nicolas, Stockingford, Weddington, and Whitestone, and the Borough of Rugby wards of Earl Craven, Fosse, and Wolvey.

The boundary changes which took effect for the 1983 general election removed the town of Bedworth, which was transferred to the newly created North Warwickshire constituency.

2010–2024: The Borough of Nuneaton and Bedworth wards of Abbey, Arbury, Attleborough, Bar Pool, Camp Hill, Galley Common, Kingswood, St Nicolas, Weddington, Wem Brook, and Whitestone, and the Borough of North Warwickshire wards of Arley and Whitacre, and Hartshill.

2024–present: The 2023 periodic review of Westminster constituencies, which was based on the ward structure in place on 1 December 2020, left the boundaries unchanged. However, further to a local government boundary review in Nuneaton and Bedworth which came into effect in May 2024, the constituency now comprises the following from the 2024 general election:

- The Borough of North Warwickshire wards of: Arley and Whitacre; Hartshill.
- The Borough of Nuneaton and Bedworth wards of: Arbury; Attleborough; Camp Hill; Chilvers Coton; Eastboro; Galley Common; Milby; St Mary's; St Nicolas; Stockingford East; Stockingford West; Weddington; Whitestone.

== History ==
The constituency was created as a result of the Redistribution of Seats Act 1885, in an area whose population had expanded as coal miners poured in from other parts of the country. At one time 20 collieries operated in the area and now one of three major British coal mines continued with operations in the constituency at Daw Mill atop the Warwickshire Coalfield (known as the Warwickshire Thick) in the north of the county until 2012 when it closed. The associated heavy industry and mining-centred economy coupled with the Representation of the People Act 1918 (Fourth Reform Act) led to Nuneaton being held by the Labour Party for nearly 50 years from 1935 to 1983. With a decline in coal mining and related heavy industry, and boundary changes that were more favourable towards the Conservatives for the 1983 general election, the sitting MP Les Huckfield declined to stand and unsuccessfully sought nomination in other constituencies such as Wigan and Sedgefield. The seat was duly won by Lewis Stevens, a Conservative who retained the seat in 1987.

Labour regained the constituency at the 1992 election. Bill Olner beat Stevens and retained the seat in 1997, 2001 and 2005. Olner announced in 2007 that he would not be contesting the 2010 general election and would be standing down at the end of the 2005–2010 parliament. Former Nuneaton and Bedworth Council Leader Marcus Jones was successful in taking the seat for the Conservative Party at the 2010 election and retained the seat in 2015, 2017 and 2019, but it was retaken for Labour by Jodie Gosling at the 2024 election.

=== 2015 general election significance ===
In the 2015 general election, Nuneaton was the first marginal constituency between the Conservatives and Labour to declare its results. The result proved to be significant as it saw a 3.0% swing to the Conservatives, despite the seat being Labour's 38th biggest target and Labour being predicted to win the seat. The result therefore proved to be a major indication that the Conservatives were going to win a majority of seats in the House of Commons for the first time since the 1992 general election, something which went against national opinion polls which pointed towards Labour gains in the key marginal constituencies.

It was later reported that the moment incumbent Prime Minister David Cameron knew his Conservative Party had won the general election was when Nuneaton declared its results at 1.53 am on 8 May 2015.

This has led to many pointing out the similarities between Nuneaton and the former constituency of Basildon which in 1987 and 1992, Labour unexpectedly failed to win. This is why the Nuneaton result has been seen as the 'Basildon Moment' of 2015, since the Basildon constituency similarly foreshadowed the Conservative's election victory in 1992.

Nuneaton was chosen by the Labour Party as the host of their first televised leadership debate during their 2015 leadership election.

== Members of Parliament ==
| Election | Member | Party |
|---|---|---|
| 1885 | Jasper Johns | Liberal |
| 1886 | John Dugdale | Conservative |
| 1892 | Francis Newdigate | Conservative |
| 1906 | William Johnson | Liberal |
| 1909 | William Johnson | Labour |
| 1914 | William Johnson | Liberal |
| 1918 | Sir Henry Maddocks | Coalition Conservative |
| 1923 | Herbert Willison | Liberal |
| 1924 | Arthur Hope | Conservative |
| 1929 | Francis Smith | Labour |
| 1931 | Edward North | Conservative |
| 1935 | Reginald Fletcher | Labour |
| 1942 by-election | Frank Bowles | Labour |
| 1965 by-election | Frank Cousins | Labour |
| 1967 by-election | Les Huckfield | Labour |
| 1983 | Lewis Stevens | Conservative |
| 1992 | Bill Olner | Labour |
| 2010 | Marcus Jones | Conservative |
| 2024 | Jodie Gosling | Labour |

== Elections ==
=== Elections in the 2020s ===
General election 2024: Nuneaton
| Party | Candidate | Votes | % | ±% |
|---|---|---|---|---|
| Labour | Jodie Gosling | 15,216 | 36.9 | +5.4 |
| Conservative | Marcus Jones | 11,737 | 28.5 | −32.1 |
| Reform | Rob Howard | 9,059 | 22.0 | N/A |
| Green | Keith Kondakor | 2,894 | 7.0 | +3.3 |
| Liberal Democrats | Joy Salaja | 1,340 | 3.3 | −0.8 |
| Workers Party | John Homer | 967 | 2.3 | N/A |
| Majority | | 3,479 | 8.4 | N/A |
| Turnout | | 41,213 | 58.7 | −6.3 |
| Labour gain from Conservative | | Swing | +18.7 | |

=== Elections in the 2010s ===
General election 2019: Nuneaton
| Party | Candidate | Votes | % | ±% |
|---|---|---|---|---|
| Conservative | Marcus Jones | 27,390 | 60.6 | ▲9.0 |
| Labour | Zoe Mayou | 14,246 | 31.5 | ▼9.8 |
| Liberal Democrats | Richard Brighton-Knight | 1,862 | 4.1 | ▲2.1 |
| Green | Keith Kondakor | 1,692 | 3.7 | ▲2.0 |
| Majority | | 13,144 | 29.1 | ▲18.8 |
| Turnout | | 45,190 | 64.3 | ▼2.4 |
| Conservative hold | | Swing | ▲9.4 | |

General election 2017: Nuneaton
| Party | Candidate | Votes | % | ±% |
|---|---|---|---|---|
| Conservative | Marcus Jones | 23,755 | 51.6 | ▲6.0 |
| Labour | Phil Johnson | 19,016 | 41.3 | ▲6.4 |
| UKIP | Craig Carpenter | 1,619 | 3.5 | ▼10.9 |
| Liberal Democrats | Richard Brighton-Knight | 914 | 2.0 | ▲0.2 |
| Green | Chris Brookes | 763 | 1.7 | ▼1.1 |
| Majority | | 4,739 | 10.3 | ▼0.4 |
| Turnout | | 46,067 | 66.67 | ▼0.5 |
| Conservative hold | | Swing | ▼0.2 | |

General election 2015: Nuneaton
| Party | Candidate | Votes | % | ±% |
|---|---|---|---|---|
| Conservative | Marcus Jones | 20,827 | 45.5 | ▲4.0 |
| Labour | Vicky Fowler | 15,945 | 34.9 | ▼2.0 |
| UKIP | Alwyn Waine | 6,582 | 14.4 | New |
| Green | Keith Kondakor | 1,281 | 2.8 | New |
| Liberal Democrats | Christina Jebb | 816 | 1.8 | ▼13.5 |
| TUSC | Paul Reilly | 194 | 0.4 | New |
| English Democrat | Steve Paxton | 104 | 0.2 | New |
| Majority | | 4,882 | 10.6 | ▲6.0 |
| Turnout | | 45,749 | 67.2 | ▲1.4 |
| Conservative hold | | Swing | ▲3.0 | |

General election 2010: Nuneaton
| Party | Candidate | Votes | % | ±% |
|---|---|---|---|---|
| Conservative | Marcus Jones | 18,536 | 41.5 | ▲4.6 |
| Labour | Jayne Innes | 16,467 | 36.9 | ▼9.8 |
| Liberal Democrats | Christina Jebb | 6,846 | 15.3 | ▲2.8 |
| BNP | Martyn Findley | 2,797 | 6.3 | New |
| Majority | | 2,069 | 4.6 | N/A |
| Turnout | | 44,646 | 65.8 | ▲6.9 |
| Conservative gain from Labour | | Swing | ▲7.2 | |

=== Elections in the 2000s ===
General election 2005: Nuneaton
| Party | Candidate | Votes | % | ±% |
|---|---|---|---|---|
| Labour | Bill Olner | 19,945 | 44.0 | ▼8.1 |
| Conservative | Mark Pawsey | 17,665 | 39.0 | ▲4.3 |
| Liberal Democrats | Ali Asghar | 5,884 | 13.0 | ▲1.9 |
| UKIP | Keith Tyson | 1,786 | 3.9 | ▲1.9 |
| Majority | | 2,280 | 5.0 | ▼12.4 |
| Turnout | | 45,279 | 61.7 | ▲1.6 |
| Labour hold | | Swing | ▼6.2 | |

General election 2001: Nuneaton
| Party | Candidate | Votes | % | ±% |
|---|---|---|---|---|
| Labour | Bill Olner | 22,577 | 52.1 | −4.1 |
| Conservative | Mark Lancaster | 15,042 | 34.7 | +3.8 |
| Liberal Democrats | Tony Ferguson | 4,820 | 11.1 | +2.3 |
| UKIP | Brian James | 873 | 2.0 | +1.5 |
| Majority | | 7,535 | 17.4 | −7.9 |
| Turnout | | 43,312 | 60.1 | −14.3 |
| Labour hold | | Swing | -3.95 | |

=== Elections in the 1990s ===
General election 1997: Nuneaton
| Party | Candidate | Votes | % | ±% |
|---|---|---|---|---|
| Labour | Bill Olner | 30,080 | 56.2 | +10.4 |
| Conservative | Richard Blunt | 16,540 | 30.9 | −12.1 |
| Liberal Democrats | Ron Cockings | 4,732 | 8.8 | −2.4 |
| Referendum | Roy English | 1,533 | 2.9 | New |
| Independent | David Bray | 390 | 0.7 | New |
| UKIP | Peter Everitt | 238 | 0.5 | New |
| Majority | | 13,540 | 25.3 | +22.5 |
| Turnout | | 53,513 | 74.4 | −8.6 |
| Labour hold | | Swing | +11.3 | |

General election 1992: Nuneaton
| Party | Candidate | Votes | % | ±% |
|---|---|---|---|---|
| Labour | Bill Olner | 27,157 | 45.8 | +11.2 |
| Conservative | Lewis Stevens | 25,526 | 43.0 | −1.9 |
| Liberal Democrats | Ruth Merritt | 6,671 | 11.2 | −8.0 |
| Majority | | 1,631 | 2.8 | N/A |
| Turnout | | 59,354 | 83.0 | +2.7 |
| Labour gain from Conservative | | Swing | +6.55 | |

=== Elections in the 1980s ===
General election 1987: Nuneaton
| Party | Candidate | Votes | % | ±% |
|---|---|---|---|---|
| Conservative | Lewis Stevens | 24,630 | 44.9 | +4.4 |
| Labour | Valerie Veness | 18,975 | 34.6 | +4.0 |
| Liberal | Andrew Trembath | 10,550 | 19.2 | New |
| Green | John Morrissey | 719 | 1.3 | New |
| Majority | | 5,655 | 10.3 | +0.4 |
| Turnout | | 54,874 | 80.3 | +3.0 |
| Conservative hold | | Swing | +0.2 | |

General election 1983: Nuneaton
| Party | Candidate | Votes | % | ±% |
|---|---|---|---|---|
| Conservative | Lewis Stevens | 20,666 | 40.5 | +2.8 |
| Labour | John Haynes | 15,605 | 30.6 | −19.3 |
| SDP | Ruth Levitt | 14,264 | 28.0 | New |
| Independent | GE Davies | 504 | 1.0 | 0.0 |
| Majority | | 5,061 | 9.9 | N/A |
| Turnout | | 51,039 | 77.3 | −1.2 |
| Conservative gain from Labour | | Swing | +11.05 | |

=== Elections in the 1970s ===
General election 1979: Nuneaton
| Party | Candidate | Votes | % | ±% |
|---|---|---|---|---|
| Labour | Les Huckfield | 31,403 | 49.9 | −6.2 |
| Conservative | Lewis Stevens | 23,715 | 37.7 | +12.4 |
| Liberal | Cecil Williams | 6,184 | 9.8 | −8.8 |
| National Front | RP Matthews | 1,028 | 1.6 | New |
| Independent | GE Davies | 504 | 1.0 | New |
| Majority | | 7,688 | 12.2 | −18.6 |
| Turnout | | 62,959 | 78.5 | +4.6 |
| Labour hold | | Swing | -9.35 | |

General election October 1974: Nuneaton
| Party | Candidate | Votes | % | ±% |
|---|---|---|---|---|
| Labour | Les Huckfield | 32,308 | 56.10 | +2.25 |
| Conservative | Roland JM Freeman | 14,547 | 25.30 | −1.05 |
| Liberal | N Hawkins | 10,729 | 18.60 | −1.19 |
| Majority | | 17,761 | 30.80 | +3.30 |
| Turnout | | 57,584 | 73.90 | −8.51 |
| Labour hold | | Swing | +1.65 | |

General election February 1974: Nuneaton
| Party | Candidate | Votes | % | ±% |
|---|---|---|---|---|
| Labour | Les Huckfield | 34,258 | 53.85 | −3.58 |
| Conservative | D Samuel | 16,765 | 26.35 | −6.34 |
| Liberal | D Inman | 12,491 | 19.79 | +10.00 |
| Majority | | 17,493 | 27.50 | +2.86 |
| Turnout | | 63,614 | 82.41 | +6.21 |
| Labour hold | | Swing | +1.38 | |

General election 1970: Nuneaton
| Party | Candidate | Votes | % | ±% |
|---|---|---|---|---|
| Labour | Les Huckfield | 32,877 | 57.43 | +3.45 |
| Conservative | Susan Lewis-Smith | 18,769 | 32.79 | +1.23 |
| Liberal | Alex Harrison | 5,602 | 9.79 | −4.67 |
| Majority | | 14,108 | 24.64 | +2.22 |
| Turnout | | 57,248 | 76.20 | −3.48 |
| Labour hold | | Swing | +7.65 | |

=== Elections in the 1960s ===
By Election 1967: Nuneaton
| Party | Candidate | Votes | % | ±% |
|---|---|---|---|---|
| Labour | Les Huckfield | 18,239 | 42.08 | −11.10 |
| Conservative | David Knox | 14,185 | 32.73 | +1.17 |
| Liberal | Alan Meredith | 7,644 | 17.64 | +3.18 |
| All Party Alliance | John Creasey | 2,755 | 6.36 | New |
| Independent | Don Bennett | 517 | 1.19 | New |
| Majority | | 4,054 | 9.35 | −13.07 |
| Turnout | | 43,340 | 67.90 | −11.78 |
| Labour hold | | Swing | -5.37 | |

General election 1966: Nuneaton
| Party | Candidate | Votes | % | ±% |
|---|---|---|---|---|
| Labour | Frank Cousins | 27,452 | 53.98 | +1.20 |
| Conservative | David S Marland | 16,049 | 31.56 | +2.48 |
| Liberal | Alan Meredith | 7,356 | 14.46 | −3.67 |
| Majority | | 11,403 | 22.42 | −1.26 |
| Turnout | | 50,857 | 79.68 | −0.43 |
| Labour hold | | Swing | +4.22 | |

By Election 1965: Nuneaton
| Party | Candidate | Votes | % | ±% |
|---|---|---|---|---|
| Labour | Frank Cousins | 18,325 | 48.92 | −3.86 |
| Conservative | David S Marland | 13,084 | 34.93 | +5.85 |
| Liberal | John Campbell | 6,047 | 16.14 | −1.99 |
| Majority | | 5,241 | 13.99 | −9.71 |
| Turnout | | 37,456 | 60.80 | −19.91 |
| Labour hold | | Swing | -4.86 | |

General election 1964: Nuneaton
| Party | Candidate | Votes | % | ±% |
|---|---|---|---|---|
| Labour | Frank Bowles | 26,059 | 52.78 | +0.34 |
| Conservative | David S Marland | 14,357 | 29.08 | −3.26 |
| Liberal | John Campbell | 8,953 | 18.13 | +2.91 |
| Majority | | 11,702 | 23.70 | +3.60 |
| Turnout | | 49,369 | 80.11 | −1.69 |
| Labour hold | | Swing | +1.80 | |

=== Elections in the 1950s ===
General election 1959: Nuneaton
| Party | Candidate | Votes | % | ±% |
|---|---|---|---|---|
| Labour | Frank Bowles | 24,894 | 52.44 | −3.39 |
| Conservative | Charles G Miller | 15,354 | 32.34 | −0.62 |
| Liberal | John Campbell | 7,227 | 15.22 | +4.00 |
| Majority | | 9,540 | 20.10 | −2.76 |
| Turnout | | 47,475 | 81.80 | −2.11 |
| Labour hold | | Swing | -1.39 | |

General election 1955: Nuneaton
| Party | Candidate | Votes | % | ±% |
|---|---|---|---|---|
| Labour | Frank Bowles | 25,112 | 55.83 | −5.80 |
| Conservative | Robert Dermott D Griffith | 14,828 | 32.96 | +3.74 |
| Liberal | John Beeching Frankenburg | 5,048 | 11.22 | +0.47 |
| Majority | | 10,284 | 22.87 | −7.94 |
| Turnout | | 44,988 | 79.69 | −5.33 |
| Labour hold | | Swing | -2.06 | |

General election 1951: Nuneaton
| Party | Candidate | Votes | % | ±% |
|---|---|---|---|---|
| Labour | Frank Bowles | 35,651 | 60.03 | +1.33 |
| Conservative | James E Tippett | 17,356 | 29.22 | +1.62 |
| Liberal | GC Middleton | 6,386 | 10.75 | −2.95 |
| Majority | | 18,295 | 30.81 | −0.39 |
| Turnout | | 59,393 | 85.02 | −2.28 |
| Labour hold | | Swing | -0.15 | |

General election 1950: Nuneaton
| Party | Candidate | Votes | % | ±% |
|---|---|---|---|---|
| Labour | Frank Bowles | 35,129 | 58.7 | +0.2 |
| Conservative | Phylis G Spencer | 16,488 | 27.6 | +4.2 |
| Liberal | Jack A Harris | 8,177 | 13.7 | −3.5 |
| Majority | | 18,641 | 31.1 | −4.0 |
| Turnout | | 59,794 | 87.3 | +8.6 |
| Labour hold | | Swing | | |

=== Elections in the 1940s ===
General election 1945: Nuneaton
| Party | Candidate | Votes | % | ±% |
|---|---|---|---|---|
| Labour | Frank Bowles | 30,587 | 58.5 | +10.1 |
| Conservative | John Fitzroy-Newdegate | 12,267 | 23.4 | −17.4 |
| Liberal | Peter Calvocoressi | 8,986 | 17.2 | +6.4 |
| Independent Progressive | Leonard Melling | 468 | 0.9 | New |
| Majority | | 18,320 | 35.1 | +27.5 |
| Turnout | | 52,308 | 78.7 | +2.8 |
| Labour hold | | Swing | | |

1942 Nuneaton by-election
| Party | Candidate | Votes | % | ±% |
|---|---|---|---|---|
| Labour | Frank Bowles | Unopposed | N/A | N/A |
| Labour hold | | Swing | | |

General Election 1939–40: Another general election was required to take place before the end of 1940. The political parties had been making preparations for an election to take place from 1939 and by the end of this year, the following candidates had been selected;

- Labour: Reginald Fletcher

=== Elections in the 1930s ===
General election 1935: Nuneaton
| Party | Candidate | Votes | % | ±% |
|---|---|---|---|---|
| Labour | Reginald Fletcher | 33,237 | 48.4 | +10.7 |
| Conservative | John Moores | 28,000 | 40.8 | −0.9 |
| Liberal | William Thomas Stanton | 7,384 | 10.8 | New |
| Majority | | 5,237 | 7.6 | +3.6 |
| Turnout | | 68,621 | 75.9 | −2.1 |
| Labour gain from Conservative | | Swing | | |

General election 1931: Nuneaton
| Party | Candidate | Votes | % | ±% |
|---|---|---|---|---|
| Conservative | Edward North | 25,839 | 41.7 | +17.4 |
| Labour | Frank Smith | 23,375 | 37.7 | −6.7 |
| National Liberal | Herbert Willison | 12,811 | 20.6 | −10.7 |
| Majority | | 2,464 | 4.0 | N/A |
| Turnout | | 62,025 | 78.0 | −6.1 |
| Conservative gain from Labour | | Swing | | |

=== Elections in the 1920s ===
General election 1929: Nuneaton
| Party | Candidate | Votes | % | ±% |
|---|---|---|---|---|
| Labour | Frank Smith | 27,102 | 44.4 | +13.1 |
| Liberal | Herbert Willison | 19,104 | 31.3 | +0.3 |
| Unionist | Arthur Hope | 14,819 | 24.3 | −13.4 |
| Majority | | 7,998 | 13.1 | N/A |
| Turnout | | 60,395 | 84.1 | +5.4 |
| Labour gain from Unionist | | Swing | +13.2 | |

General election 1924: Nuneaton
| Party | Candidate | Votes | % | ±% |
|---|---|---|---|---|
| Unionist | Arthur Hope | 15,242 | 37.7 | +7.2 |
| Labour | Frank Smith | 12,679 | 31.3 | +2.2 |
| Liberal | Herbert Willison | 12,550 | 31.0 | −9.4 |
| Majority | | 2,563 | 6.4 | −3.5 |
| Turnout | | 40,471 | 78.7 | +6.1 |
| Unionist gain from Liberal | | Swing | N/A | |

General election 1923: Nuneaton
| Party | Candidate | Votes | % | ±% |
|---|---|---|---|---|
| Liberal | Herbert Willison | 14,518 | 40.4 | +11.2 |
| Unionist | Henry Maddocks | 10,940 | 30.5 | −7.8 |
| Labour | Thomas Barron | 10,437 | 29.1 | −3.4 |
| Majority | | 3,578 | 9.9 | N/A |
| Turnout | | 35,895 | 72.6 | +2.8 |
| Liberal gain from Unionist | | Swing | +9.5 | |

General election 1922: Nuneaton
| Party | Candidate | Votes | % | ±% |
|---|---|---|---|---|
| Unionist | Henry Maddocks | 12,765 | 38.3 | −7.9 |
| Labour | J Stevenson | 10,842 | 32.5 | +6.7 |
| Liberal | Thomas Slack | 9,730 | 29.2 | +5.7 |
| Majority | | 1,923 | 5.8 | −14.6 |
| Turnout | | 33,337 | 69.8 | +13.9 |
| Unionist hold | | Swing | -7.3 | |

=== Elections in the 1910s ===
General election 1918: Nuneaton
| Party | Candidate | Votes | % | ±% |
|---|---|---|---|---|
| Unionist | *Henry Maddocks | 11,198 | 46.2 | −1.6 |
| Labour | Ivor Gregory | 6,269 | 25.8 | −16.4 |
| Liberal | William Henry Grant | 5,707 | 23.5 | New |
| National Democratic | William Henry Dyson | 1,101 | 4.5 | New |
| Majority | | 4,929 | 20.4 | N/A |
| Turnout | | 24,275 | 55.9 | −34.1 |
| Unionist gain from Liberal | | Swing | | |

- denotes candidate who was endorsed by the Coalition Government.

== Election results 1885–1918 ==
=== Elections in the 1880s ===
General election 1885: Nuneaton
| Party | Candidate | Votes | % | ±% |
|---|---|---|---|---|
| Liberal | Jasper Johns | 4,445 | 51.6 | |
| Conservative | John Dugdale | 4,169 | 48.4 | |
| Majority | | 276 | 3.2 | |
| Turnout | | 8,614 | 85.6 | |
| Registered electors | | 10,061 | | |
| Liberal win (new seat) | | | | |

General election 1886: Nuneaton
| Party | Candidate | Votes | % | ±% |
|---|---|---|---|---|
| Conservative | John Dugdale | 4,626 | 56.2 | +7.8 |
| Liberal | Jasper Johns | 3,608 | 43.8 | −7.8 |
| Majority | | 1,018 | 12.4 | N/A |
| Turnout | | 8,234 | 81.8 | −3.8 |
| Registered electors | | 10,061 | | |
| Conservative gain from Liberal | | Swing | +7.8 | |

=== Elections in the 1890s ===
General election 1892: Nuneaton
| Party | Candidate | Votes | % | ±% |
|---|---|---|---|---|
| Conservative | Francis Newdegate | 4,899 | 53.5 | −2.7 |
| Liberal | Charles Vero | 4,258 | 46.5 | +2.7 |
| Majority | | 641 | 7.0 | −5.4 |
| Turnout | | 9,157 | 88.6 | +6.8 |
| Registered electors | | 10,336 | | |
| Conservative hold | | Swing | −2.7 | |

Tomkinson

General election 1895: Nuneaton
| Party | Candidate | Votes | % | ±% |
|---|---|---|---|---|
| Conservative | Francis Newdegate | 5,572 | 57.2 | +3.7 |
| Liberal | James Tomkinson | 4,175 | 42.8 | −3.7 |
| Majority | | 1,397 | 14.4 | +7.4 |
| Turnout | | 9,747 | 87.7 | −0.9 |
| Registered electors | | 11,114 | | |
| Conservative hold | | Swing | +3.7 | |

=== Elections in the 1900s ===
General election 1900: Nuneaton
| Party | Candidate | Votes | % | ±% |
|---|---|---|---|---|
| Conservative | Francis Newdegate | 5,736 | 56.4 | −0.8 |
| Lib-Lab | William Johnson | 4,432 | 43.6 | +0.8 |
| Majority | | 1,304 | 12.8 | −1.6 |
| Turnout | | 10,168 | 78.9 | −8.8 |
| Registered electors | | 12,894 | | |
| Conservative hold | | Swing | −0.8 | |

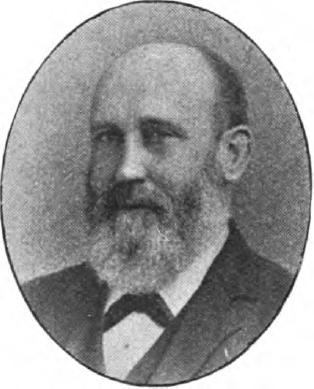
Johnson

General election 1906: Nuneaton
| Party | Candidate | Votes | % | ±% |
|---|---|---|---|---|
| Lib-Lab | William Johnson | 7,677 | 56.8 | +13.2 |
| Conservative | Francis Newdigate-Newdegate | 5,849 | 43.2 | −13.2 |
| Majority | | 1,828 | 13.6 | N/A |
| Turnout | | 13,526 | 90.0 | +11.1 |
| Registered electors | | 15,021 | | |
| Lib-Lab gain from Conservative | | Swing | +13.2 | |

=== Elections in the 1910s ===
General election January 1910: Nuneaton
| Party | Candidate | Votes | % | ±% |
|---|---|---|---|---|
| Labour | William Johnson | 8,154 | 50.8 | −6.0 |
| Conservative | Henry Maddocks | 7,891 | 49.2 | +6.0 |
| Majority | | 263 | 1.6 | −12.0 |
| Turnout | | 16,045 | 91.9 | +1.9 |
| Registered electors | | 17,451 | | |
| Labour hold | | Swing | −6.0 | |

General election December 1910: Nuneaton
| Party | Candidate | Votes | % | ±% |
|---|---|---|---|---|
| Labour | William Johnson | 8,199 | 52.2 | +1.4 |
| Conservative | Henry Maddocks | 7,501 | 47.8 | −1.4 |
| Majority | | 698 | 4.4 | +2.8 |
| Turnout | | 15,700 | 90.0 | −1.9 |
| Registered electors | | 17,451 | | |
| Labour hold | | Swing | +1.4 | |

General Election 1914–15:

Another General Election was required to take place before the end of 1915. The political parties had been making preparations for an election to take place and by July 1914, the following candidates had been selected;

- Liberal-Labour: William Johnson
- Unionist:

== See also ==
- List of parliamentary constituencies in Warwickshire
- List of parliamentary constituencies in West Midlands (region)

== Notes ==
Notes
