= Frank Bowles, Baron Bowles =

British politician (1902-1970)

The Right Honourable The Lord Bowles
- Baron Bowles in 1961

Deputy Chief Whip of the House of Lords Captain of the Yeomen of the Guard
- In office 28 December 1964 – 19 June 1970
- Monarch: Elizabeth II
- Prime Minister: Harold Wilson
- Preceded by: The Viscount Goschen
- Succeeded by: The Viscount Goschen

Deputy Chairman of Ways and Means
- In office 29 October 1948 – 7 March 1950
- Speaker: Douglas Clifton Brown
- Preceded by: Hubert Beaumont
- Succeeded by: Charles MacAndrew

Member of the House of Lords Lord Temporal
- In office 12 December 1964 – 29 December 1970; Life Peerage

Member of Parliament for Nuneaton
- In office 10 March 1942 – 12 December 1964
- Preceded by: Reginald Fletcher
- Succeeded by: Frank Cousins

Personal details
- Born: 2 May 1902
- Died: 29 December 1970 (aged 68)
- Party: Labour (1924–1970)
- Other political affiliations: Liberal (–1924)
- Occupation: Solicitor

Francis George Bowles, Baron Bowles (2 May 1902 – 29 December 1970) was a British solicitor and politician. A long-serving Member of Parliament (MP), Bowles served briefly as a Deputy Speaker of the House of Commons, but is perhaps best known for agreeing to give up his safe seat to make way for Minister of Technology Frank Cousins.

== Early life and career ==
The son of an analytical chemist, Bowles was educated at Highgate School and the University of London where he obtained the degree of Bachelor of Laws and the London School of Economics where he became a Bachelor of Economic Science. He was admitted to the roll of solicitors in 1925. He worked for Pearl Assurance Ltd as their in-house solicitor; his grandfather had been Chairman of the company.

== Political career ==
Originally a Liberal, Bowles soon shifted his allegiances to the Labour Party in 1924 while at the LSE. He fought the constituency of Hackney North in the 1929 general election, losing by 866 votes. He fought it again at the two succeeding elections of 1931 and 1935, in that case losing by 1,080.

=== Byelection candidate ===
Bowles was then chosen to fight the Preston by-election of November 1936. This was a highly marginal constituency, and the local Constituency Labour Party had wanted Bowles to fight it at the 1935 general election (Bowles refused as he had already committed to Hackney). He led an energetic campaign calling for the whole of Lancashire to be declared a Special Area for government assistance. On polling day, Bowles was defeated by 1,605 votes, while Florence White of the Spinsters' Pensions Association took 3,221.

=== Parliament ===
Finally, Bowles entered Parliament unopposed as MP for Nuneaton in March 1942, when the sitting MP was made one of the few Labour Peers. He was popular with fellow MPs, and in November 1946 was elected vice-chairman of the Parliamentary Labour Party. When Hubert Beaumont, Deputy Chairman of Committees (Second deputy Speaker) resigned due to ill health, Bowles was named to succeed him in October 1948; this recognised his mastery of Parliamentary procedure.

Following the 1950 general election, Bowles stood down as Deputy Speaker. He married Kay Musgrove later that year after a whirlwind courtship. In the 1950s he was made a Trustee of the House of Commons. Bowles tended to prefer the backseat roles which were important in Parliament but not widely known to the public. His few prominent campaigns included better pay for members of parliament, although he did also press for safer motor racing after the Le Mans disaster of 1955.

=== Giving up his seat ===
Bowles' constituency party, while holding him in reasonable regard, were inclined to complain that he neglected them and preferred to stay in London. When, following the 1964 general election, Frank Cousins was appointed as Minister of Technology, the Labour whips sought out MPs with safe seats who would accept a Peerage to make way for him. Bowles volunteered. He told the press he had initially been "shocked, tremendously worried and ill" at the thought of leaving the Commons, but decided to make the sacrifice. Cousins won the subsequent by-election.

=== Lords ===
Once he had been created a life peer on 12 December 1964 as Baron Bowles, of Nuneaton in the County of Warwick, Bowles was appointed as Captain of the Yeomen of the Guard and Government Deputy Chief Whip in the House of Lords. He held this post until the Labour government went out of office in 1970. Bowles died at the end of that year.

Parliament of the United Kingdom
Preceded by Reginald Fletcher	Member of Parliament for Nuneaton; 1942–1964	Succeeded by Frank Cousins
Political offices
Preceded by Capt. Hubert Beaumont	Deputy Chairman of Ways and Means; 1948–1950	Succeeded by Sir Charles MacAndrew
Preceded by The Viscount Goschen	Captain of the Yeomen of the Guard; 1964–1970	Succeeded by The Viscount Goschen
Party political offices
Preceded by	Labour Deputy Chief Whip in the House of Lords; 1964–1970	Succeeded by
