= Francis Taylor Piggott =

British jurist and author (1852–1925)

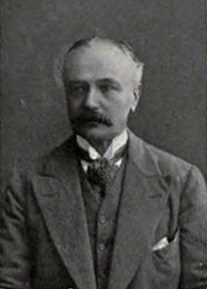
Francis Taylor Piggott

Sir Francis Taylor Piggott (25 April 1852 – 12 March 1925) was a British jurist and author. He was the Chief Justice of Hong Kong from 1905 to 1912.

== Early life ==
Piggott was born at 31 Lower Belgrave Street, London, the son of the Revd Francis Allen Piggott (d. 1871) of Worthing; his mother, Mary Frances Errebess, daughter of Dr John Hollamby Taylor, died at the time of his birth.

He was educated in Paris, at Worthing College and at Trinity College, Cambridge where he obtained a Master of Arts and Master of Laws.

== Career ==
Piggott was called to the bar in 1874 at the Middle Temple. In 1881 he married Mabel Waldron (1854-1949), the eldest daughter of Jasper Wilson Johns MP, and founder of the Colonial Nursing Association; they had two sons, Francis Stewart Gilderoy Piggott (1883-1966) and Julian Ito Piggott (1888-1965). He published Law of Torts in 1885.

In 1887, he was appointed to a three-year term as constitutional adviser to the Japanese Prime Minister Itō Hirobumi, while, in 1893, he was Secretary of Sir Charles Russell in the Bering Sea Arbitration. He was Procureur-General of Mauritius from 1893 to 1904, acting as the Chief Justice of Mauritius in 1895. In 1905 he was appointed Chief Justice of Hong Kong and was knighted in the same year. He was compulsorily retired from that post in 1912 at the age of 60.

The Times obituary referred to: "his energy, enthusiasm, and cultured mind" which "did much to stimulate the study of international law".

Piggott published two novels under the penname Hope Dawlish and a ‘musical playlet’. In addition, he wrote books and articles on Japanese arts and exhibited his paintings in London. His legal writings included more than a dozen major books and several articles. On his retirement he intended to write a series of historical and legal works on the law of the sea.

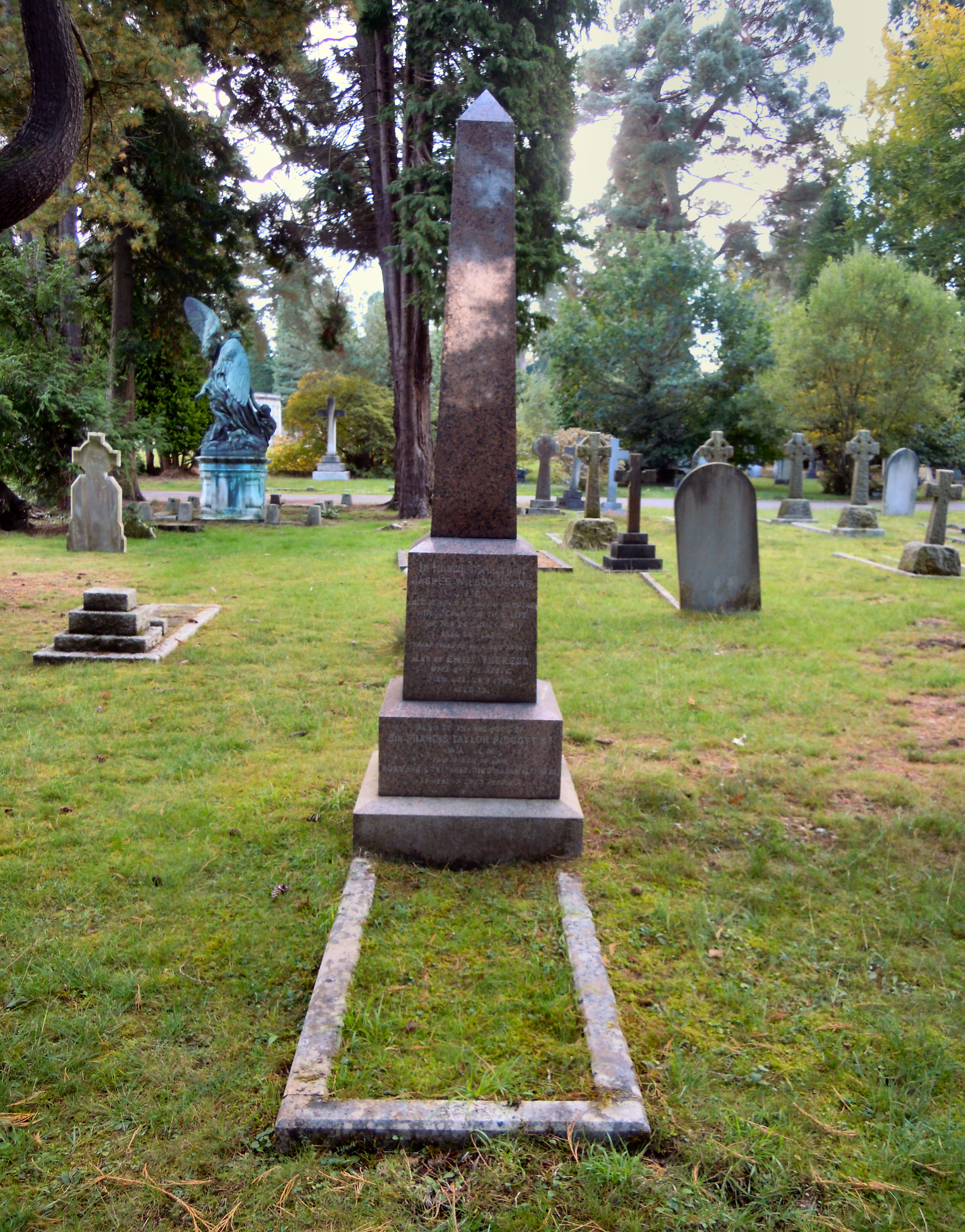
Piggott's grave in Brookwood Cemetery

Peter Wesley-Smith, writing of Piggott for the Oxford Dictionary of National Biography, said of him:

"Piggott was genial but tactless, pompous but lacking in dignity, learned but inaccurate, industrious yet impecunious, and admired by a few while reviled by many. His record as a judge is sound, though he failed as a judicial administrator and there were many allegations of his partiality on the bench. Eventually he was required to retire soon after reaching the age of sixty. This was a rude shock to him, even though an amendment, known colloquially as ‘the Piggott Relief Ordinance’, had been made to the local pensions legislation precisely to facilitate his removal. He was chronically short of money; indeed in 1922 he was adjudged bankrupt, with creditors in Hong Kong alone owed £15,000. On losing his Hong Kong post he sought employment in Peking (Beijing), but the Foreign Office advised the Chinese government not to appoint him. His return to Hong Kong to practise at the private bar was considered almost scandalous, and when he left for England in 1914 his passage was paid for out of the vote for the relief of destitutes."

Piggott died on 12 March 1925 at his home, 33 Thurloe Square, London. He is buried in Brookwood Cemetery in the grave of his wife's parents.

== Selected works ==
Piggot's writings include about 80 works

- The Music and Musical Instruments of Japan, by F. T. Piggott. (With Notes by T. L. Southgate.). Kelly and Walsh. 1909.
- with David Urquhart (1918). The Free Seas in War: a Talk to the Men and Women of Great Britain on the Freedom of the Seas. P.S. King & Son, ltd.
- The Garden of Japan: A Year's Diary of its Flowers. G. Allen. 1896.
- Piggott, Francis Taylor (1891). The Music of the Japanese: Read Jan. 14, 1891.
- Exterritoriality: The Law Relating to Consular Jurisdiction and to Residence in Oriental Countries. Kelly & Walsh, limited. 1907.

Legal offices
| Preceded by Sir W Meigh Goodman | Chief Justice of hong Kong; 1905-1912 | Succeeded by Sir William Rees-Davies |
