= Camp Hill, Nuneaton =

Suburb in Warwickshire, England

Coordinates: 52.531445°N 1.501733°W

Camp Hill
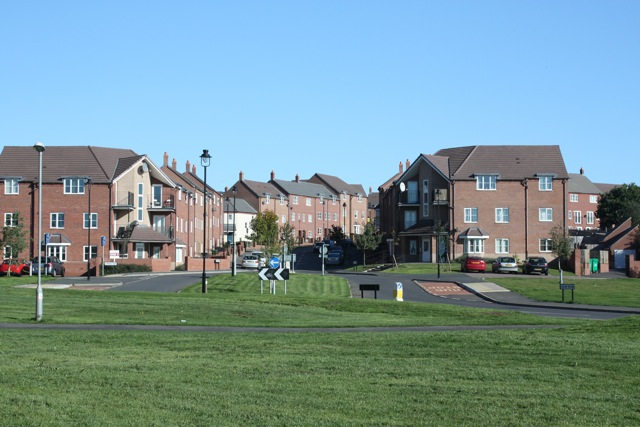
- Modern housing at Spruce Road, Camp Hill

- Location within Warwickshire
- Population: 9,599 (Ward 2021)
- District: Nuneaton and Bedworth
- Shire county: Warwickshire
- Region: West Midlands
- Country: England
- Sovereign state: United Kingdom
- Post town: NUNEATON
- Postcode district: CV10
- Dialling code: 024

Camp Hill is a suburb of the town of Nuneaton in Warwickshire located around 1.5 miles (2.4 km) north-west of the town centre. It is also a ward of Nuneaton and Bedworth borough, which had a population of 9,599 in the 2021 census.

The name of the area is said to have been derived from an old Roman camp.

== Camp Hill Hall ==
The area was once home to a Tudor style mansion house called Camp Hill Hall which was built in the 1780s by banker William Craddock. It was at one time home to John Barber, the inventor of the gas turbine. After the last owner died in 1928, the contents of the hall were sold off in an auction, and the hall stood empty. In 1932, the hall and its extensive grounds were purchased by Nuneaton Borough Council, who demolished it in either 1934 or 1939 (sources vary) to facilitate housing development in the area.

== Modern housing estate ==
A large council estate was built at Camp Hill on the grounds of the former mansion in the 1950s to alleviate a housing shortage. When completed in 1956, this development consisted of around 1,400 council houses. Many of these houses were built by the National Coal Board to house workers involved in the local coal mining industry. However this industry died out, and the Camp Hill estate gained a reputation as being one of Nuneaton's most deprived areas. In the 2000s, the estate was the subject of a £14 million urban regeneration scheme.

To the south of the area is Whittleford Park, a public park and nature reserve, reclaimed from former industrial land in the 2000s. To the north-east, and within the ward is the Mount Judd spoil heap, which overlooks the area as a local landmark.
