= Edward North (Conservative politician) =

British politician

Edward North JP

Member of Parliament for Nuneaton
- In office 1931–1935
- Preceded by: Frank Smith
- Succeeded by: Reginald Fletcher
- Majority: 2,464 (4.0%)

Personal details
- Born: January 31, 1900 Kirkby Lonsdale, Westmorland
- Died: January 1, 1942
- Resting place: St John the Baptist's Church, Tunstall
- Party: Conservative
- Spouse: Mary Scott Wilkinson (m. 1928)
- Children: 1

Major Edward Tempest Tunstall North JP (31 January 1900 – 1 January 1942) was a British Conservative Party politician. He was the Member of Parliament (MP) for Nuneaton in Warwickshire from 1931 until 1935. He died on active service in 1942, aged 41.

== Background ==
Edward North was the son of Brigadier-General Bordrigge North North, CB MVO JP DL (1862–1936) and his wife Maud Mabella North (née Coulthurst) of Carnforth. He was born at Newton Hall, Kirkby Lonsdale, Westmorland. He was educated at Eton and Trinity College, Cambridge, to which he was admitted as a Pensioner in 1919. In 1928, he married Mary Scott Wilkinson, daughter of T.W. Wilkinson of Carnforth. He had a son named Richard. In 1935, he was living at The Ridding, Bentham, Yorkshire.

== Parliamentary career ==
At the 1931 election, he was selected as the Conservative candidate for the seat of Nuneaton in Warwickshire. Following a strong swing to the Conservatives, he unseated the sitting Labour MP, Frank Smith with a majority of 2,464. He did not contest the seat in 1935 when it was lost back to the Labour candidate, Reginald Fletcher.

== Military career ==
During the Second World War, North served as a Major in the Royal Armoured Corps, Yorkshire Hussars. He died on 1 January 1942. He is buried in the churchyard of St John the Baptist church, Tunstall, Lancashire.

Parliament of the United Kingdom
Preceded by Frank Smith	Member of Parliament for Nuneaton; 1931 – 1935	Succeeded by Reginald Fletcher
