= 1965 Nuneaton by-election =

UK parliamentary by-election

A by-election for the United Kingdom House of Commons was held in the constituency of Nuneaton on 21 January 1965, following the creation of a vacancy by the granting of a life peerage to the sitting Labour Member of Parliament (MP) Frank Bowles.

== Background ==
Following the Labour victory in the 1964 general election, new Prime Minister Harold Wilson appointed the General Secretary of the powerful Transport and General Workers' Union, Frank Cousins, as Minister of Technology. Since Cousins was not a Member of Parliament, attempts were made to find him a seat. Bowles volunteered to accept a peerage to make way for him in what was considered a safe seat, with a majority of over 11,000. He told the press he had initially been "shocked, tremendously worried and ill" at the thought of leaving the Commons, but decided to make the sacrifice.

== Result ==
Nuneaton by-election, 21 January 1965
Party	Candidate	Votes	%	±%
Labour	Frank Cousins	18,325	48.92	−3.86
Conservative	David S Marland	13,084	34.93	+5.85
Liberal	John Campbell	6,047	16.14	−1.99
Majority		5,241	13.99	−9.71
Turnout		37,456	60.80	−19.91
Labour hold		Swing	-4.85	

== Previous result ==
General election 1964: Nuneaton
Party	Candidate	Votes	%	±%
Labour	Frank Bowles	26,059	52.78	+0.34
Conservative	David S Marland	14,357	29.08	−3.26
Liberal	Alan Meredith	8,953	18.13	+2.91
Majority		11,702	23.70	+3.61
Turnout		49,369	80.11	−1.69
Labour hold		Swing	+1.80	

== See also ==
- Nuneaton constituency
- Lists of United Kingdom by-elections
- List of United Kingdom by-elections (1950-1979)
