= Donald Wright (schoolmaster) =

English schoolmaster

Arthur Robert Donald Wright OBE (20 June 1923 – 10 July 2012) was an English schoolmaster who taught at several schools, including Marlborough College and Shrewsbury School, where he was head master. In 1971 he was Chairman of the Headmasters' Conference. After retiring from teaching, he worked at Lambeth Palace for the Archbishop of Canterbury.

As a young man he saw active service with the British Army during the closing stages of the Second World War.

== Early life ==
Born in Wolverhampton, Wright was the youngest son of the marriage of Charles North Wright and Beatrice May Walker. His family was "Church of England, but still touched by a Methodist past". He was educated at The Downs and Leighton Park, both Quaker schools. His teachers included W. H. Auden.

== Career ==
From school, Wright joined the British Army, received officer training, and during the Second World War rose to the rank of captain in the Royal Artillery. He took part in the Allied D-Day landings in Normandy, saw fighting across northern France and into Germany, and was later stationed near the Russian lines.

After the war, Wright joined Queens' College, Cambridge, graduating with a degree in History in 1948 and later proceeding to Master of Arts. On 26 June 1948 he married Helen Muryell Buxton, a daughter of Patrick Buxton FRS, and they had five children.

Going into schoolteaching, Wright's posts were at University College School, 1948–1950; The Hill School, Pennsylvania, 1950–1951, Leighton Park School, 1951–1953, Marlborough College, 1953–1963, where he was a housemaster, and finally at Shrewsbury School as headmaster 1963–1975. In 1971 he was Chairman of the Headmasters' Conference.

One of Wright's former schoolboys, Christopher Martin-Jenkins, recalled him in his years at Marlborough as "an imposing figure, very tall, with a slight stoop, he had a loud voice and was never dull or predictable. On one occasion he threw a book at a boy called Horsey who had offended him in some way. On another... he threw a whole desk at someone as well."

On his time at Shrewsbury, The Times has called Wright a "great reforming headmaster". While there, working with the Anglican Diocese of Liverpool, Wright took a leading role in the building of a new Shrewsbury House, the school's mission in Liverpool, which was opened in 1974 by Princess Anne. While he was head of Shrewsbury, he secured many leading churchmen to come to preach in the school chapel, including Henry Chadwick, David Jenkins, Dennis Nineham, Stuart Blanch, and Donald Coggan, Archbishop of Canterbury.

After retiring as a headmaster in 1975, Wright became the Archbishop of Canterbury's Patronage Secretary, based at Lambeth Palace, also chairing the William Temple Foundation and serving as Secretary to the Crown Appointments Commission which has the task of recommending the appointment of Church of England bishops. He was still in post when Archbishop Coggan retired in 1980 and was asked to consult on his successor.

== Later life ==
With his wife, Helen, Wright had some twenty years of retirement at Coulston, Wiltshire, where he was active in the parish church and became a campaigner on environmental causes. He was a Governor of King's College School, Wimbledon, 1981–1992, and a member of the committee of the Wiltshire Blind Association, 1985–1997. In 1984 he was appointed an Officer of the Order of the British Empire. He died in July 2012, aged 89, and his funeral service was at Edington Priory.
