= John Goschen, 3rd Viscount Goschen =

British peer, soldier and politician (1906–1977)

The Right Honourable The Viscount Goschen KBE
- Arms of the Viscounts Goschen

Deputy Chief Whip of the House of Lords Captain of the Yeomen of the Guard
- In office 24 June 1970 – 20 November 1971
- Monarch: Elizabeth II
- Prime Minister: Edward Heath
- Preceded by: The Lord Bowles
- Succeeded by: The Lord Denham
- In office 6 September 1962 – 28 December 1964
- Monarch: Elizabeth II
- Prime Minister: Alec Douglas-Home; Harold Macmillan
- Preceded by: The Lord Newton
- Succeeded by: The Lord Bowles

Member of the House of Lords
- Lord Temporal
- In office 24 July 1952 – 22 March 1977
- Preceded by: The 2nd Viscount Goschen
- Succeeded by: The 4th Viscount Goschen

Personal details
- Born: John Alexander Goschen; 7 July 1906
- Died: 22 March 1977 (aged 70)
- Party: Conservative

John Alexander Goschen, 3rd Viscount Goschen (7 July 1906 – 22 March 1977), was a British Conservative politician.

Goschen was the second son of the Hon. Sir William Henry Goschen (1870–1943), second son of George Goschen, 1st Viscount Goschen, and was educated at Eton College and Sandhurst. He was a Colonel in the Grenadier Guards and served with the British Military Mission to Greece from 1945 to 1947. He was appointed an Officer of the Order of the British Empire for his military service in 1944.

He succeeded his uncle in the viscountcy in 1952 and took his seat on the Conservative benches in the House of Lords. He served under Harold Macmillan, Sir Alec Douglas-Home and Edward Heath as Captain of the Yeomen of the Guard (Deputy Chief Whip in the House of Lords) from 1962 to 1964 and from 1970 to 1971. In 1972 he was appointed a Knight Commander of the Order of the British Empire for his political and public service.

Lord Goschen married firstly Hilda Violet Ursula Jervis, daughter of Colonel the Hon. St Leger Henry Jervis and granddaughter of the third Viscount St Vincent, in 1934. They were divorced in 1943. He married secondly Alvin Moyanna Lesley England (died 2017), daughter of Harry England, in 1955. They had one son and one daughter.

Lord Goschen died in March 1977, aged 70, and was succeeded by his only son Giles.

Political offices
Preceded by The Lord Newton	Captain of the Yeomen of the Guard; 1962–1964	Succeeded by The Lord Bowles
Preceded by The Lord Bowles	Captain of the Yeomen of the Guard; 1970–1971	Succeeded by The Lord Denham
Peerage of the United Kingdom
Preceded by George Goschen	Viscount Goschen; 1952–1977; Member of the House of Lords (1952–1977)	Succeeded by Giles Goschen
