= P. A. Buxton =

British medical entomologist

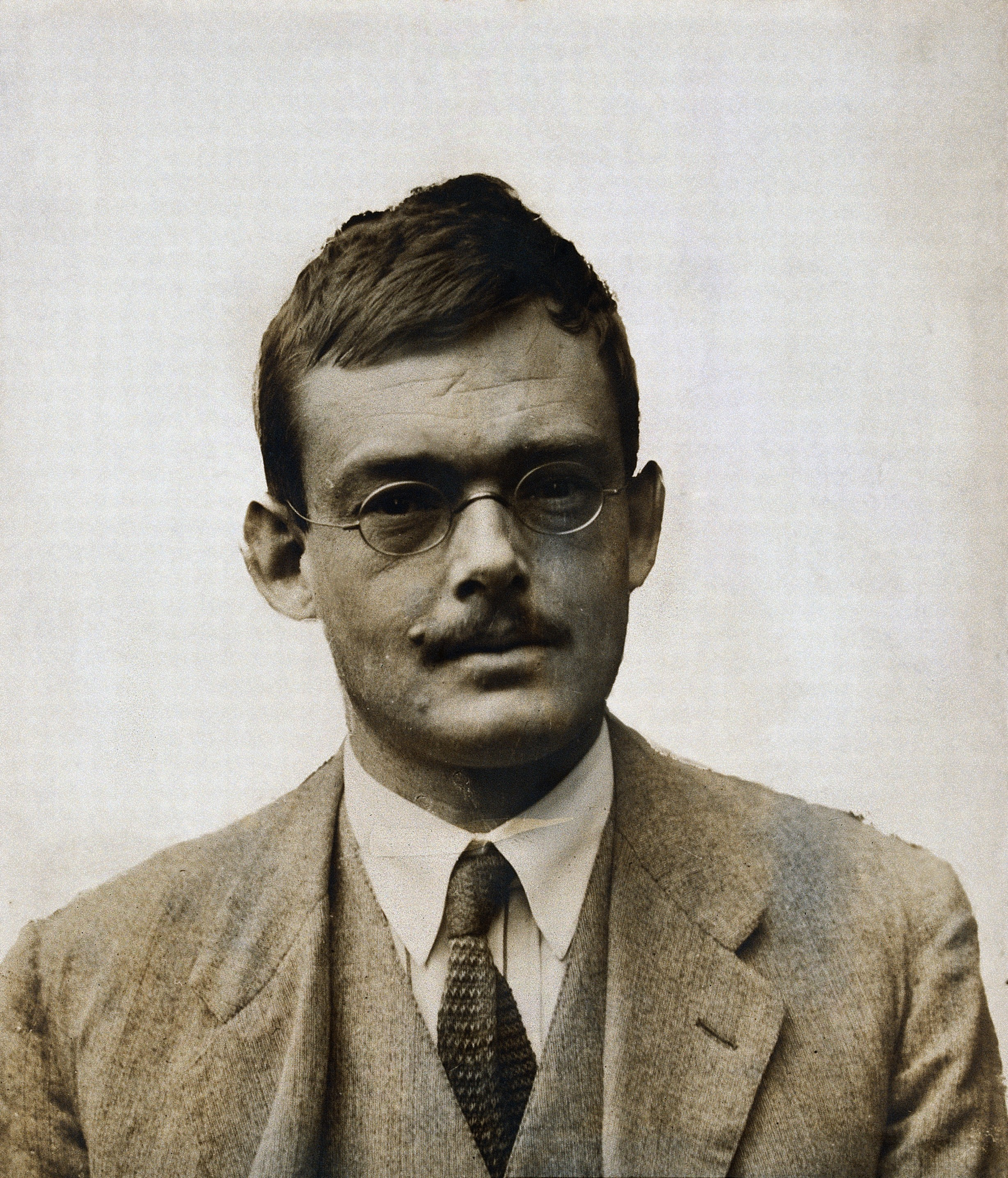
- Born: Patrick Alfred Buxton; 24 March 1892; London, England
- Died: 13 December 1955 (aged 63); Gerrards Cross, England
- Awards: FRS (1943); CMG (1947); Linnean Medal (1953)
- Scientific career
- Fields: Entomology

Patrick Alfred Buxton CMG FRS FLS (24 March 1892 – 13 December 1955) was a British medical entomologist.

== Origins ==
Patrick Buxton was born on 24 March 1892 in Hyde Park Street, Paddington, London. He is the son of banker and politician, Alfred Fowell Buxton (1854–1952) and his wife Violet Jex-Blake.

== Career ==
Buxton was educated at Rugby School and Trinity College, Cambridge, where he graduated with first class honours in Natural Sciences, in 1915. He was elected a fellow of the college in 1916. He continued his studies at St George's Hospital, London and qualified in medicine in 1917. Since it was during the First World War, he immediately took up a commission in the Royal Army Medical Corps and served in Mesopotamia and North West Persia.

While in the middle east he extensively collected and developed his interest in insects. In 1921, Buxton accepted the post of an entomologist in the Medical Department in Palestine. From 1923 to January 1926, he was on a collecting expedition in Samoa. On returning to London, he was appointed head of the Department of Entomology in the London School of Hygiene and Tropical Medicine. His work was mainly focused on understanding insects in relation to control. He was involved in the practical control of pests such as lice, mosquitoes, and flies during the Second World War. After the war in 1945–1946, he was involved in East Africa on the problem of the control of Tsetse flies.

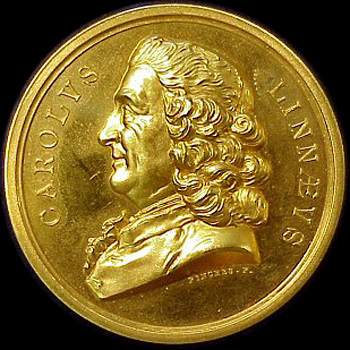
Linnean Medal. The awardee's name is shown on the reverse side

== Awards and honours ==
Buxton was awarded the Linnean Medal, elected a Fellow of the Royal Society (1943), and Companion of the Order of St Michael and St George (1947).

== Marriage and family ==
Patrick Buxton married Muryell Gladys Rice (1895–1989) in March 1917, in Swansea, Glamorgan, Wales.

Patrick and Muryell had two sons and four daughters:

- Martin Patrick (1920–1966) was a Captain in the Royal Signals and held the office of First Secretary of the Foreign Service.
- Andrew Patrick (1923–1952) was a Flight Lieutenant in the Royal Air Force and was awarded the Distinguished Flying Cross (D.F.C.) during World War II. He was a mammalogist at the Virus Research Institute in Entebbe, Uganda where he died.
- Helen Muryell (1925–2014), married Donald Wright 26 June 1948, with five children.
- Marian Elizabeth (1927–1984)
- Rachel Katharine (1930–) married Christopher Herzig on 19 July 1952.
- Lucy Bertha (1932–)

He died on 13 December 1955 at his home Grit Howe, Gerrards Cross, Buckinghamshire but his widow survived him by more than 30 years and died on 6 September 1989 in Oxford.
