= Henry Maddocks (politician) =

British politician

Sir Henry Maddocks KC

Member of Parliament for Nuneaton
- In office 1918–1923
- Preceded by: William Johnson
- Succeeded by: Herbert Willison
- Majority: 1,923 (5.8%)

Personal details
- Born: April 26, 1871
- Died: 9 June 1931 (aged 60)
- Party: Coalition Conservative
- Spouse: Elsie Mary Anslow (m. 1896)
- Children: 6 (including Henry Maddocks)

Sir Henry Maddocks KC (26 April 1871 — 9 June 1931) was an English lawyer and British Conservative Party politician.

== Early life ==
He was son of William Maddocks of Prees, Shropshire and educated at Wem Grammar School.

== Legal career ==
He was articled to a solicitor in the Staffordshire Potteries, qualifying as solicitor himself in 1893. For a time he was managing clerk at a practice in Birmingham and another in Coventry which he later took over. He also concurrently served as clerk to the magistrates of Coleshill Petty Sessions.

He continued his law studies for the bar, and became a barrister of the Inner Temple in 1904, passing his Bar final exams with first-class honours and coming first in his class in criminal law. He practiced on the Midland judicial circuit until well after taking Silk in 1920 and moving to London.

He was one of the first K.C.s to appear without fee under the Poor Persons Rules. In one case he successfully represented a poor widow in three trials against different judges, becoming praised by one, Mr Justice Horridge, as having "sacrificed himself most nobly", while another, Mr Justice McCardie, declared: "The Bar of England is the stronger for his example."

After leaving Parliament, Maddocks served as Recorder of the borough of Stamford from 1924 to 1925, then was Recorder of the City of Birmingham from 1925 until his death. He became a Bencher of the Inner Temple in 1928.

In the years following World War I, in which one of his sons was killed, Maddocks had a reputation as an advocate for disabled ex-servicemen, and was an early member of the Imperial War Graves Commission. He once proposed that convicted criminals who were subsequently killed while serving in the armed forces should have their conviction records erased.

== Political career ==
In both the general elections of 1910 he unsuccessfully stood as Conservative candidate for the Nuneaton division of Warwickshire but was elected as a Coalition Conservative, at the 1918 general election as Member of Parliament for the same seat. and re-elected in 1922. He was knighted in the 1923 Birthday Honours and among his profession he was talked of as a future Solicitor General. However, at the 1923 general election the Conservative government led by Stanley Baldwin fell and he was defeated by the Liberal Party candidate Herbert Willison, who was ironically a longstanding friend and a solicitor who had instructed Maddocks to take on cases in the latter's early years as barrister. Maddocks did not stand for Parliament again.

== Personal life ==
Maddocks married in 1895, Elsie Mary, daughter of John Anslow of Coventry, by whom he had six sons. Captain Henry Hollingdrake Maddocks was awarded the Military Cross and Lt. John Anslow Maddocks was killed in the First World War. one of which William Michael Maddocks went on to become High Sheriff of Warwickshire for 1963. Maddocks, whose last home was at "Wytheford", Sandy Lodge, Northwood, Middlesex, died in June 1931 aged 60 and was buried in nearby Pinner Cemetery.

Parliament of the United Kingdom
Preceded by William Johnson	Member of Parliament for Nuneaton; 1918 – 1923	Succeeded by Herbert Willison
