= Frank Smith (British politician) =

British newspaper editor and Christian socialist politician

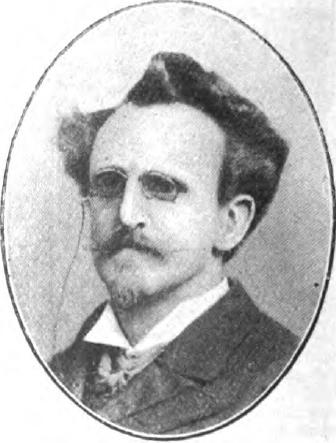
- Official portrait, 1908

Member of Parliament for Nuneaton
- In office 1929–1931
- Preceded by: Arthur Hope
- Succeeded by: Edward North
- Majority: 7,998 (13.1%)

Personal details
- Born: c. 1854 Chelsea, London
- Died: 26 December 1940
- Party: Labour

Francis Samuel Smith (1854 – 26 December 1940) was a British newspaper editor and Christian socialist politician, who contested a large number of elections before finally winning a parliamentary seat in his mid-70s.

Born in Chelsea, Smith was educated privately and ran an upholstery company in Sloane Street. He was active in the Chelsea Mission, and through that joined the Salvation Army in its early days. In 1884 he moved to the United States to quell a secessionist movement among the Salvationists there, then returned to the UK as the first leader of the Social Wing of the Salvation Army. On the voyage to America he read Henry George's book, Progress and Poverty which introduced him to Georgist ideas. In 1890, he co-wrote In Darkest England and the Way Out with William Booth. However, he left the movement later in the year, to involve himself in the labour movement, founding the Labour Army and Workers' Cry, a newspaper which he edited from two years. In 1892, he became editor of the Weekly Dispatch, holding the post for three years.

Smith stood unsuccessfully in Hammersmith at the 1892 general election, but he was elected to the London County Council, playing a key role on the body until 1913. He became a founding member of the Independent Labour Party (ILP), and was its first parliamentary candidate, at the 1894 Sheffield Attercliffe by-election. A close friend of its leader, Keir Hardie, he drew on some experience in radical journalism to assist with the relaunch of the Labour Leader. Smith also stood in Glasgow Tradeston at the 1895 general election, in the meantime involving himself in spiritualism and the Brotherhood Movement, emphasising that, for him, socialism was entirely compatible with religion. After the election, he undertook a speaking tour of the United States with Hardie. In 1901, he resigned his council seat and rejoined the Salvation Army, but continued as an active socialist, becoming Secretary of the National Right to Work Council in 1908.

The ILP was a founding element of the Labour Party, and Smith stood under this label in many elections: the 1909 Taunton by-election, 1909 Croydon by-election, in Chatham in December 1910, Balham and Tooting in 1918, Birmingham West in 1922 and 1923, and Nuneaton in 1924. He finally won Nuneaton at the 1929 general election, his twelfth attempt to get into Parliament. Despite already being 74 years old, he acted as Parliamentary Private Secretary to George Lansbury from October 1930, but lost his seat at the 1931 general election.

Parliament of the United Kingdom
Preceded by Arthur Hope	Member of Parliament for Nuneaton; 1929–1931	Succeeded by Edward North
Media offices
Preceded by William Hunter	Editor of the Weekly Dispatch; 1892–1895	Succeeded by Charles John Tibbits
