= Jasper Johns (Liberal politician) =

Member of Parliament for Nuneaton
- In office 1885–1886
- Preceded by: Constituency established
- Succeeded by: John Dugdale
- Majority: 8,614 (85.6%)

Personal details
- Born: c. 1824
- Died: July 26, 1891
- Resting place: Brookwood Cemetery
- Party: Liberal
- Spouse: Emily Theresa Bird (m. 1855)
- Children: 1
- Relatives: Francis Taylor Piggott (son-in-law)

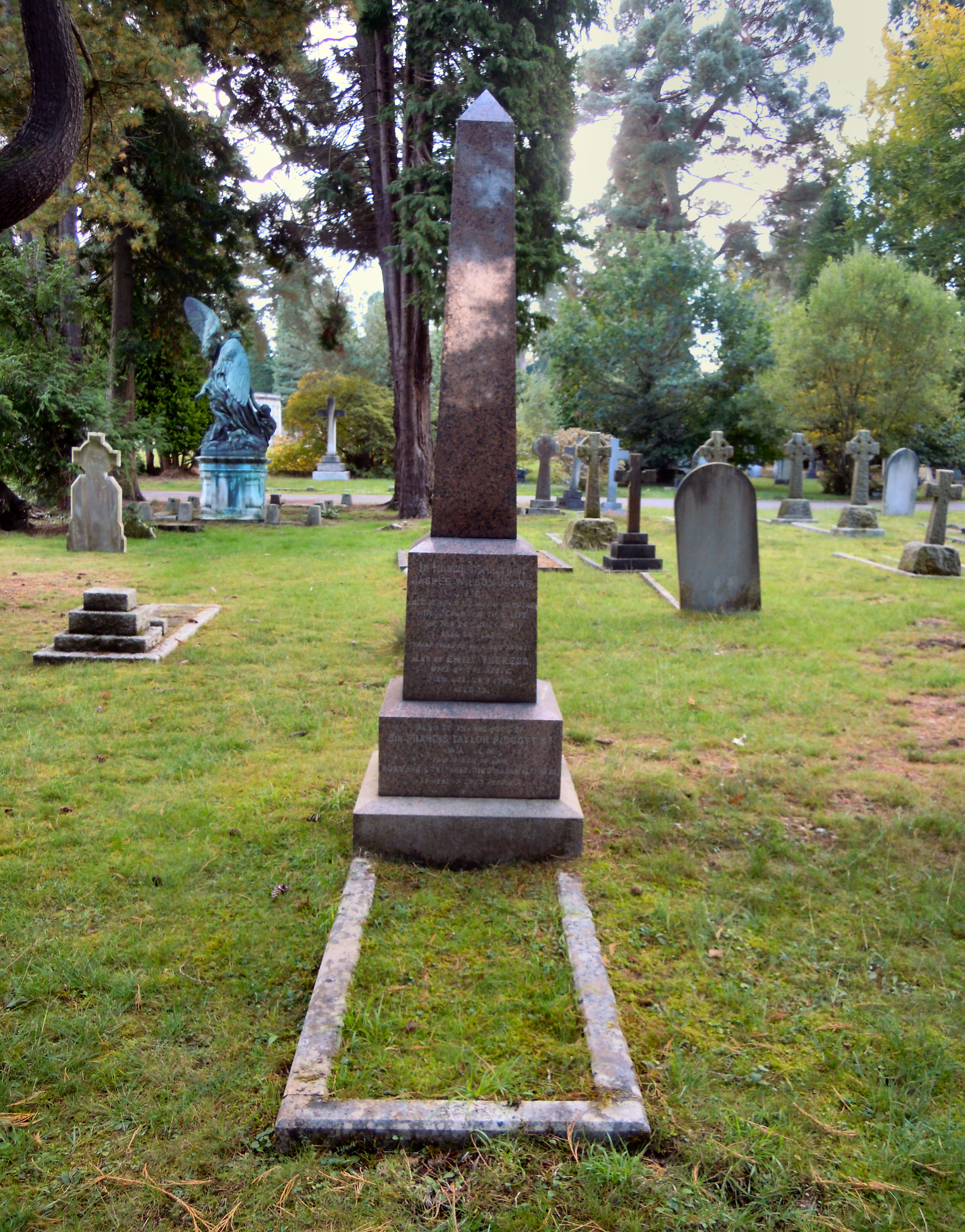
Jasper Wilson Johns' grave in Brookwood Cemetery

Jasper Wilson Johns (1824 – 26 July 1891) was a civil engineer, merchant, railway promoter and Liberal Party politician.

Johns was the son of Thomas Evans Johns of Cardiganshire and his wife Elizabeth Tudor Avis. Johns became a civil engineer and practiced until 1854. He was then involved in William Bird & Co. of London, a firm of iron merchants. He was an active promoter of railways in Wales of which he was chairman or deputy chairman for many years until they were taken over by the London and North Western Railway. He was one of the earliest Volunteer officers as captain commanding the 3rd Montgomery Rifle Volunteers. He was a J. P. for Merioneth and Montgomery, and a Deputy Lieutenant for Merioneth.

Johns stood unsuccessfully for Parliament at Northallerton in 1865 and 1868. At the 1885 general election, he was elected as Member of Parliament (MP) for Nuneaton. but was defeated at the 1886 general election and did not stand for Parliament again.

Johns married Emily Theresa Bird, in 1855. His daughter Mabel married Sir Francis Taylor Piggott, jurist and writer. He died in 1891, at the age of 67 and is buried in Brookwood Cemetery in a grave he shares with his wife and son-in-law Francis Taylor Piggott.

Parliament of the United Kingdom
New constituency	Member of Parliament for Nuneaton; 1885–1886	Succeeded by John Dugdale
