= Captain of the Yeomen of the Guard =

Position held by the Deputy Chief Whip in the House of Lords

Captain of the King's Bodyguard of the Yeomen of the Guard & Government Deputy Chief Whip in the House of Lords

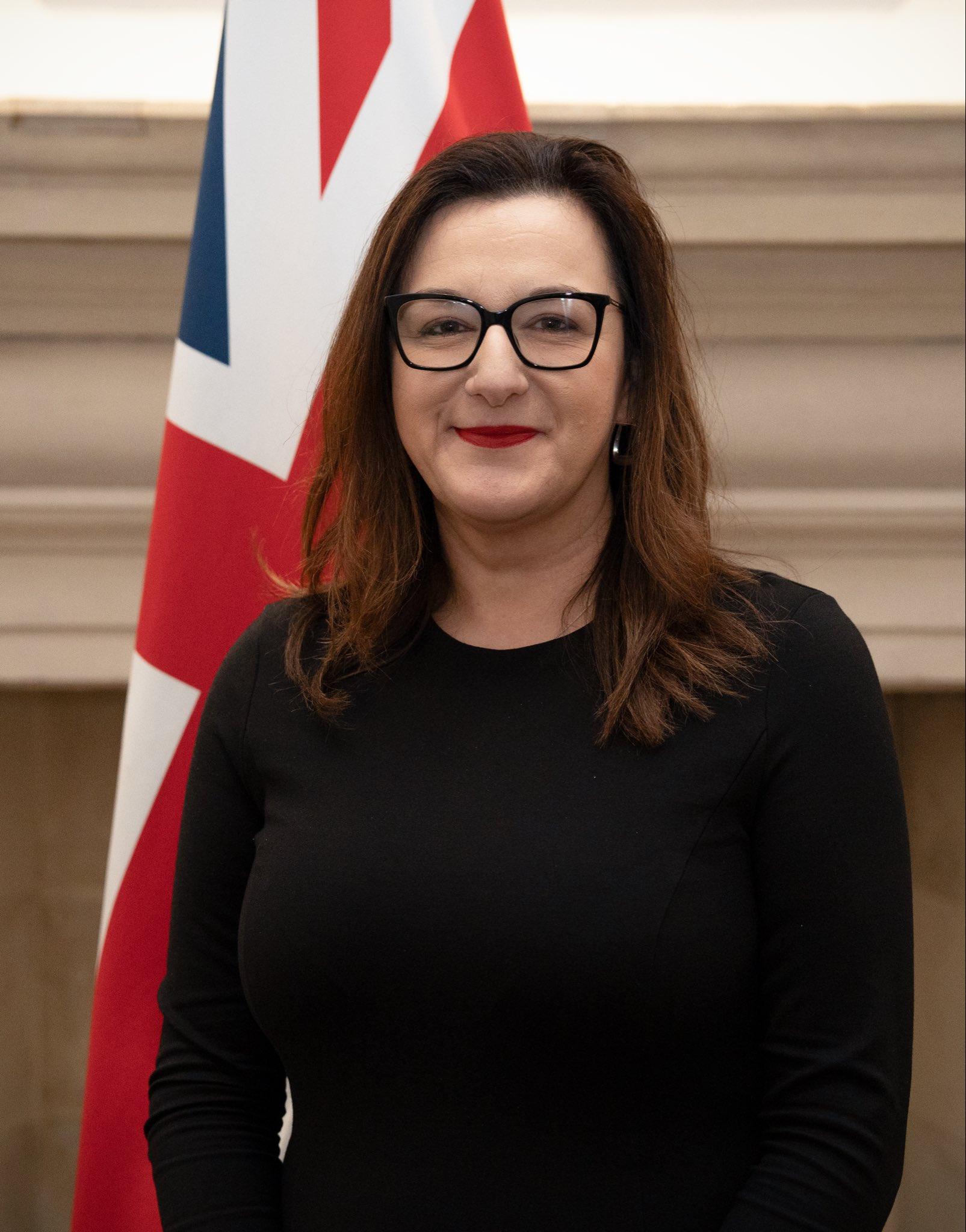
- Incumbent; Ruth Anderson, Baroness Anderson of Stoke-on-Trent since 22 July 2026
- Style: The Right Honourable
- Appointer: Prime Minister
- Formation: 1485
- First holder: John de Vere, 13th Earl of Oxford

The Captain of the King's Bodyguard of the Yeomen of the Guard is a UK Government post usually held by the Government Deputy Chief Whip in the House of Lords. The present Captain is The Baroness Anderson, who was appointed to the position in the Burnham ministry in July 2026.

== 1485–present ==
=== 15th century ===
- 1485: John de Vere, 13th Earl of Oxford
- 1486–1509: Sir Charles Somerset (created Baron Herbert 26 November 1506)

=== 16th century ===
- 1509: Sir Thomas Darcy
- 1509: Sir Henry Marney
- 1512: Sir Henry Guildford
- 1513: Sir John Gage
- 1516: Sir Henry Marney
- 1530: Sir William Kingston
- 1539: Sir Anthony Wingfield
- 1550: Sir Thomas Darcy (created Baron Darcy of Chiche 5 April 1551)
- 1551: Sir John Gates
- 1553: Sir Henry Jerningham
- 1557: Sir Henry Bedingfeld
- 1558: Sir Edward Rogers
- 1558: Sir William St Loe
- 1566: Sir Francis Knowlys
- 1572: Sir Christopher Hatton
- 1586: Sir Henry Goodier
- 1586: Sir Walter Raleigh
- 1592: John Best (During Raleigh's imprisonment in the Tower)
- 1597–1603: Sir Walter Raleigh

=== 17th century ===
- 1603: Sir Thomas Erskine (created Lord Dirletoun 8 June 1604 and Viscount Fentoun 18 March 1606)
- 1617: Henry Rich (created Baron Kensington 5 March 1623 and Earl of Holland 24 September 1624)
- 1632: George Hay
- 1635: William Douglas, 7th Earl of Morton
- 1644: George Goring, 1st Earl of Norwich
- 1649: Interregnum
- 1660: George Goring, 1st Earl of Norwich
- 1662: George Villiers, 4th Viscount Grandison
- 1689–1702: Charles Montagu, Viscount Mandeville (succeeded as 4th Earl of Manchester 16 March 1683)

=== 18th century ===
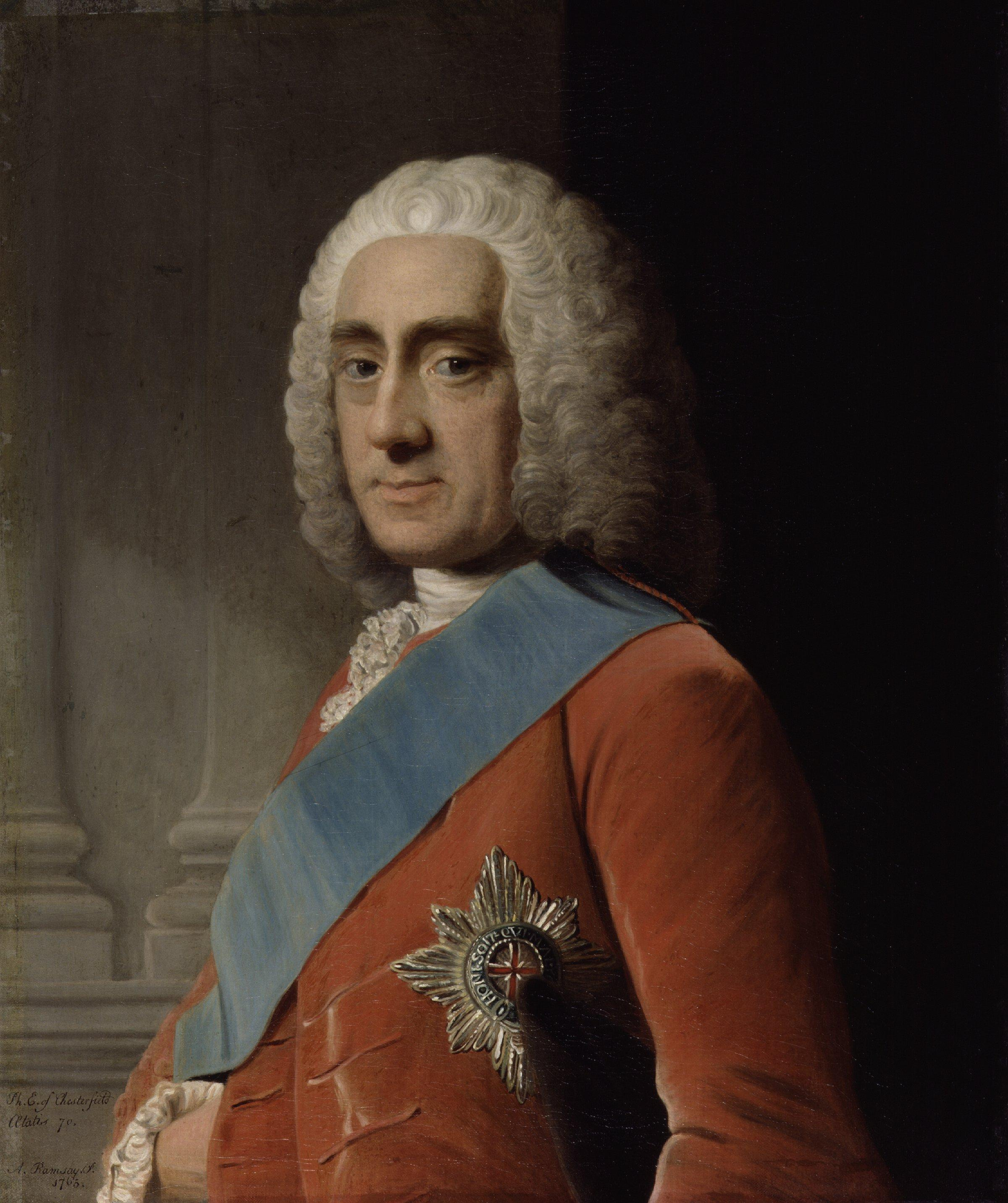
Philip Stanhope, 4th Earl of Chesterfield, who served as Captain of the Yeomen of the Guard from 1723 to 1725.

- 1702: William Cavendish, Marquess of Hartington
- 1707: Charles Townshend, 2nd Viscount Townshend
- 1711: Henry Paget, 7th Baron Paget (created Earl of Uxbridge 19 October 1714)
- 1715: James Stanley, 10th Earl of Derby
- 1723: Philip Stanhope, Baron Stanhope
- 1725: John Sidney, 6th Earl of Leicester
- 1731: John Ashburnham, 1st Earl of Ashburnham
- 1733: Charles Bennet, 2nd Earl of Tankerville
- 1737: William Montagu, 2nd Duke of Manchester
- 1739: William Capell, 3rd Earl of Essex
- 1743: John Berkeley, 5th Baron Berkeley of Stratton
- 1746: Pattee Byng, 2nd Viscount Torrington
- 1747: Hugh Boscawen, 2nd Viscount Falmouth
- 1782: John Sackville, 3rd Duke of Dorset
- April 1783: George Cholmondeley, 4th Earl of Cholmondeley
- 16 December 1783: Heneage Finch, 4th Earl of Aylesford

=== 19th century ===
- 1804: Thomas Pelham, 2nd Baron Pelham of Stanmer
- 1804: George Parker, 4th Earl of Macclesfield
- 1 December 1830: Ulick de Burgh, 1st Marquess of Clanricarde
- 16 July 1834: Archibald Acheson, 2nd Earl of Gosford
- 29 December 1834: James Stopford, 3rd Earl of Courtown
- 23 April 1835: Archibald Acheson, 2nd Earl of Gosford
- 5 August 1835: Henry Fox-Strangways, 3rd Earl of Ilchester
- 6 July 1841: Henry Fitzalan-Howard, Earl of Surrey
- 8 September 1841: John Kerr, 7th Marquess of Lothian
- 15 January 1842: George Percy, Earl of Beverley
- 24 July 1846: Lucius Cary, 10th Viscount Falkland
- 11 February 1848: George Chichester, 3rd Marquess of Donegall
- 27 February 1852: William FitzGerald-de Ros, 22nd Baron de Ros
- 30 December 1852: John Townshend 3rd Viscount Sydney
- 17 March 1858: William FitzGerald-de Ros, 22nd Baron de Ros
- 28 June 1859: Henry Moreton, 3rd Earl of Ducie
- 10 July 1866: Henry Cadogan, 4th Earl Cadogan
- 22 December 1868: William Beauclerk, 10th Duke of St Albans
- 2 March 1874: Edward Bootle-Wilbraham, 2nd Baron Skelmersdale
- 3 May 1880: William Monson, 7th Baron Monson
- 27 June 1885: George Barrington, 7th Viscount Barrington
- 10 February 1886: William Monson, 7th Baron Monson
- 5 August 1886: Algernon Keith-Falconer, 9th Earl of Kintore
- 29 January 1889: William Pery, 3rd Earl of Limerick
- 25 August 1892: William Edwardes, 4th Baron Kensington
- 16 July 1895: William Pery, 3rd Earl of Limerick
- 26 August 1896: William Waldegrave, 9th Earl Waldegrave

=== 20th century ===
- 8 December 1905: William Montagu, 9th Duke of Manchester
- 12 April 1908: Wentworth Beaumont, 1st Viscount Allendale
- 2 October 1911: William Craven, 4th Earl of Craven
- 9 June 1915: Charles Harbord, 6th Baron Suffield
- 21 May 1918: Hylton Jolliffe, 3rd Baron Hylton
- 22 January 1924: Edward Loch, 2nd Baron Loch
- 1 December 1924: William Grenfell, 1st Baron Desborough
- 4 June 1929: Edward Loch, 2nd Baron Loch

Name	Term of office		Party	Ministry	Ref.
Donald Howard; 3rd Baron Strathcona and Mount Royal	November 1931	January 1934	Conservative	National Government II (Con.–Lib–Nat Lab–Nat Lib)	
Arthur Chichester; 4th Baron Templemore	January 1934	August 1945	Conservative	National Government II (Con.–Lib–Nat Lab–Nat Lib)	
Arthur Chichester; 4th Baron Templemore	January 1934	August 1945	Conservative	National Government III (Con.–Nat Lab–Nat Lib)	
Arthur Chichester; 4th Baron Templemore	January 1934	August 1945	Conservative	National Government IV (Con.–Nat Lab–Nat Lib)	
Arthur Chichester; 4th Baron Templemore	January 1934	August 1945	Conservative	Chamberlain (War Ministry) (Con.–Nat Lab–Nat Lib)	
Arthur Chichester; 4th Baron Templemore	January 1934	August 1945	Conservative	Churchill (War Ministry) (Con.–Lib–Lab-Nat Lab–Nat Lib)	
Arthur Chichester; 4th Baron Templemore	January 1934	August 1945	Conservative	Churchill (Caretaker) (Con.–Nat Lib-Ind)	
Alexander Walkden; 1st Baron Walkden	August 1945	July 1949	Labour	Attlee I	
George Shepherd; 1st Baron Shepherd	July 1949	October 1949	Labour	Attlee I	
George Lucas; 1st Baron Lucas of Chilworth	October 1949	March 1950	Labour	Attlee I	
George Bingham; 6th Earl of Lucan	March 1950	June 1951	Labour	Attlee II	
George Archibald; 1st Baron Archibald	June 1951	November 1951	Labour	Attlee II	
William Onslow; 6th Earl of Onslow	November 1951	October 1960	Conservative	Churchill III	
William Onslow; 6th Earl of Onslow	November 1951	October 1960	Conservative	Eden	
William Onslow; 6th Earl of Onslow	November 1951	October 1960	Conservative	Macmillan I	
William Onslow; 6th Earl of Onslow	November 1951	October 1960	Conservative	Macmillan II	
Peter Legh; 4th Baron Newton	October 1960	September 1962	Conservative	Macmillan II	
John Goschen; 3rd Viscount Goschen	September 1962	December 1964	Conservative	Macmillan II	
John Goschen; 3rd Viscount Goschen	September 1962	December 1964	Conservative	Douglas-Home	
Frank Bowles; Baron Bowles	December 1964	June 1970	Labour	Wilson II	
John Goschen; 3rd Viscount Goschen	June 1970	November 1971	Conservative	Heath	
Bertram Bowyer; 2nd Baron Denham	November 1971	March 1974	Conservative	Heath	
David Kenworthy; 11th Baron Strabolgi	March 1974	May 1979	Labour	Wilson III	
David Kenworthy; 11th Baron Strabolgi	March 1974	May 1979	Labour	Wilson IV	
David Kenworthy; 11th Baron Strabolgi	March 1974	May 1979	Labour	Callaghan	
Andrew Hill; 7th Baron Sandys	May 1979	October 1982	Conservative	Thatcher I	
David Cunliffe-Lister; 2nd Earl of Swinton	October 1982	September 1986	Conservative	Thatcher I	
David Cunliffe-Lister; 2nd Earl of Swinton	October 1982	September 1986	Conservative	Thatcher II	
David Cunliffe-Lister; 2nd Earl of Swinton	October 1982	September 1986	Conservative	Thatcher III	
Andrew Davidson; 2nd Viscount Davidson	September 1986	December 1991	Conservative	Thatcher III	
Andrew Davidson; 2nd Viscount Davidson	September 1986	December 1991	Conservative	Major I	
Michael Bowes-Lyon; 18th Earl of Strathmore and Kinghorne	December 1991	July 1994	Conservative	Major I	
Michael Bowes-Lyon; 18th Earl of Strathmore and Kinghorne	December 1991	July 1994	Conservative	Major II	
Arthur Gore; 9th Earl of Arran	July 1994	January 1995	Conservative	Major II	
Richard Fletcher-Vane; 2nd Baron Inglewood	January 1995	July 1995	Conservative	Major II	
Nicholas Cavendish; 6th Baron Chesham	July 1995	May; 1997	Conservative	Major II	
Andrew McIntosh; Baron McIntosh of Haringey	May; 1997	June; 2003	Labour	Blair I	

=== 21st century ===
Portrait	Name	Term of office		Party	Ministry	Ref.
	Bryan Davies; Baron Davies of Oldham	June; 2003	May; 2010	Labour	Blair II	
	Bryan Davies; Baron Davies of Oldham	June; 2003	May; 2010	Labour	Blair III	
	Bryan Davies; Baron Davies of Oldham	June; 2003	May; 2010	Labour	Brown	
	David Shutt; Baron Shutt of Greetland	May; 2010	May; 2012	Liberal Democrat	Cameron–Clegg (Con.–L.D.)	
	Richard Newby; Baron Newby	May; 2012	May; 2015	Liberal Democrat	Cameron–Clegg (Con.–L.D.)	
	John Gardiner; Baron Gardiner of Kimble	May; 2015	July; 2016	Conservative	Cameron II	
	Patrick Stopford; 9th Earl of Courtown	July; 2016	July; 2024	Conservative	May I	
	Patrick Stopford; 9th Earl of Courtown	July; 2016	July; 2024	Conservative	May II	
	Patrick Stopford; 9th Earl of Courtown	July; 2016	July; 2024	Conservative	Johnson I	
	Patrick Stopford; 9th Earl of Courtown	July; 2016	July; 2024	Conservative	Johnson II	
	Patrick Stopford; 9th Earl of Courtown	July; 2016	July; 2024	Conservative	Truss	
	Patrick Stopford; 9th Earl of Courtown	July; 2016	July; 2024	Conservative	Sunak	
	Margaret Wheeler; Baroness Wheeler	July; 2024	July; 2026	Labour	Starmer	
	Ruth Anderson; Baroness Anderson of Stoke on Trent	July; 2026	Incumbent	Labour	Burnham	
