= John Dugdale (Conservative politician) =

British Conservative Party politician

John Dugdale KC
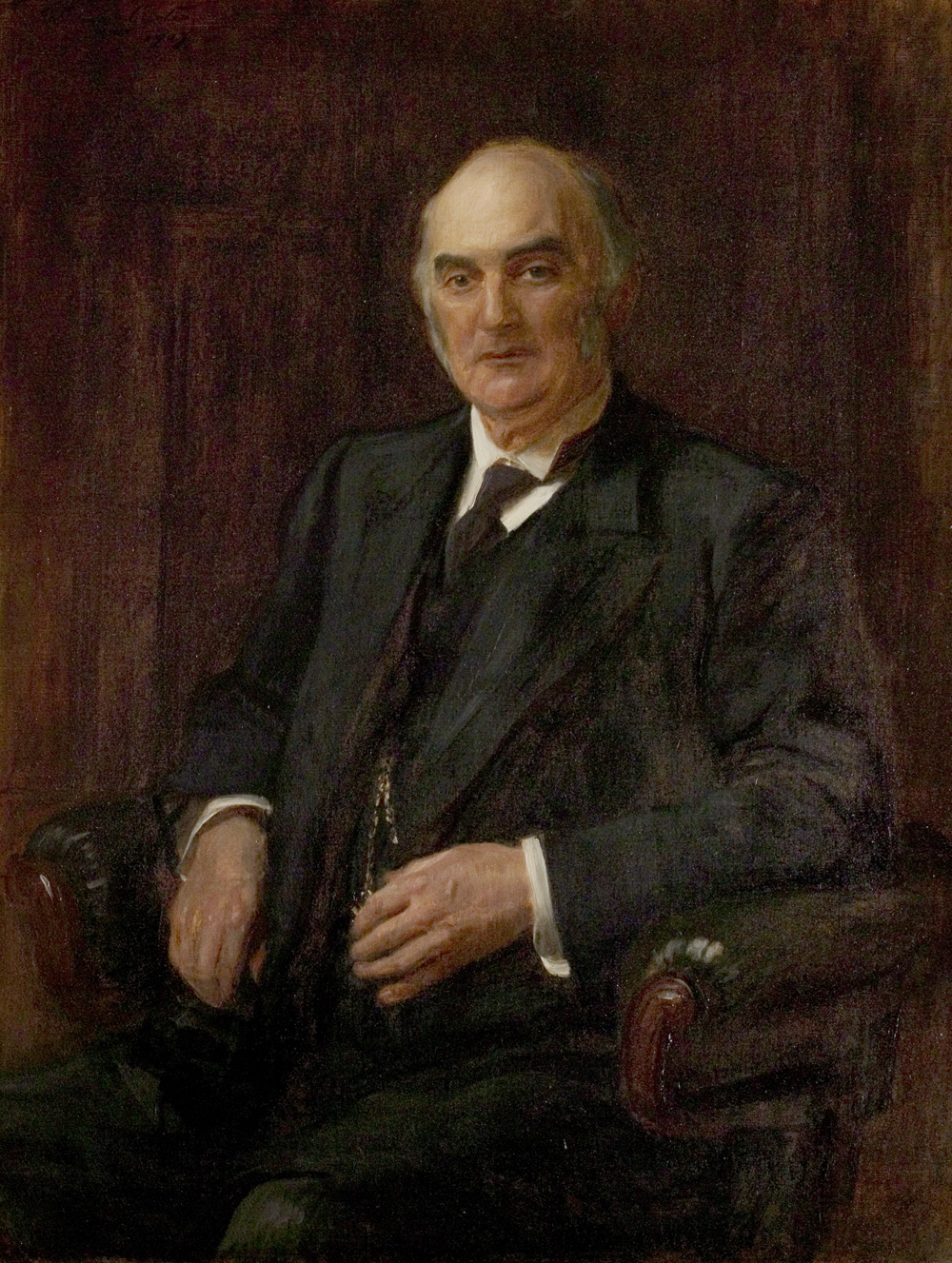

Member of Parliament for Nuneaton
- In office 1886–1892
- Preceded by: Jasper Johns
- Succeeded by: Francis Newdigate
- Majority: 1,018 (12.4%)

Personal details
- Born: July 30, 1835
- Died: October 27, 1920
- Party: Conservative
- Occupation: Politician; barrister

John Stratford Dugdale KC (30 July 1835 – 27 October 1920) was a lawyer and Conservative Party politician in the United Kingdom.

He was elected at the 1886 general election as member of parliament (MP) for Nuneaton, having stood unsuccessfully in 1885. He stood down at the 1892 general election, and did not stand again.

Shortly before his election, Dugdale was resident at Blythe Hall, Coleshill, and was Recorder for Birmingham. He was a King's Counsel.

In 1889 he was appointed the first chairman of Warwickshire County Council. An oil portrait of Dugdale, by William Carter, is in Warwick Shire Hall.

Parliament of the United Kingdom
| Preceded by Jasper Johns | Member of Parliament for Nuneaton; 1886–1892 | Succeeded by Francis Newdegate |
