= Henry Maddocks (RAF officer) =

British World War I flying ace

Henry Hollingdrake Maddocks
- Born: 7 August 1898; Coventry, Warwickshire, England
- Died: 11 July 1969 (aged 70); London, England
- Relatives: Sir Henry Maddocks (father)
- Military career
- Allegiance: United Kingdom
- Branch: British Army; Royal Air Force
- Service years: 1916–1919; 1921
- Rank: Captain
- Unit: No. 54 Squadron RFC
- Conflicts: World War I; Western Front
- Awards: Military Cross
- Other work: Barrister

Captain Henry Hollingdrake Maddocks MC (7 August 1898 – 11 July 1969) was a British World War I flying ace credited with seven aerial victories.

== Biography ==
Maddocks was the son of politician Sir Henry Maddocks. After serving as a sergeant in the Berkhamsted School Officers' Training Corps Maddocks was commissioned as a temporary second lieutenant for service in the Royal Flying Corps on 5 August 1916, and was appointed a flying officer on 26 December.

Maddocks was posted to No. 54 Squadron RFC, flying the Sopwith Pup single-seat fighter, and gained his first aerial victory on 12 August 1917, driving down an Albatros D.V out of control. On 16 September he sent an Albatros D.III down in flames east of Slype, and on the 25th did the same to another D.V north of Middelkerke. He and Second Lieutenant S. J. Schooley destroyed a D.V north of Diksmuide on 4 November.

On 17 December, Maddocks was awarded the Military Cross, which was gazetted on 19 April 1918. His citation read:

Second Lieutenant Henry Hollindrake Maddocks, General List and Royal Flying Corps.

"For conspicuous gallantry and devotion to duty. Whilst attacking two hostile aeroplanes he saw an enemy machine attacking one of his patrol. He at once attacked the enemy machine, which was seen to crash. On one occasion during a fight between seven enemy machines and a patrol of our scouts, he engaged one of the enemy machines causing it to drop from 6,000 feet to 1,000 feet, where it caught fire and dived vertically down. On two other occasions he drove down an enemy machine after a short fight. He has done consistent and continual good work."

No. 54 Squadron was then re-equipped with the Sopwith Camel, in which early on 3 January 1918 he sent down in flames a DFW C reconnaissance aircraft east of St. Quentin, and later the same day, two D.Vs over Honnecourt.

Maddocks was promoted to lieutenant on 5 February 1918, and left the Royal Air Force with the rank of captain, when transferred to the unemployed list on 28 May 1919. He was briefly restored to the active list for temporary duty in the Royal Air Force as a flight lieutenant between 10 April and 5 June 1921, being then re-transferred to the unemployed list.

His elder brother, Lt. John Anslow Maddocks, was killed in 1916.

Post-war Maddocks turned to the law as a profession, becoming a barrister, and being appointed recorder of the Borough of Burton-upon-Trent on 13 August 1938, and a member of the Royal Commission on Marriage and Divorce on 20 May 1952.
