= Whittleford Park =

Park in Warwickshire, England

Coordinates: 52.525°N 1.503°W

Whittleford Park is a 43 hectare greenspace located between Stockingford and Camp Hill in Nuneaton, Warwickshire. Although its development as a public park by Warwickshire County Council only started in 2005, it has a long industrial history, being the site of coal mining, and brick and tile making.

== History ==
Surface mining was once undertaken on the site, before large collieries such as Nuneaton Colliery, Stockingford Colliery, Ansley Hall Colliery and Haunchwood Colliery took over. Tramways connected most of the pits with the local canal wharfs and the mainline railways. The final pit closed in 1970, and the site was cleared shortly afterwards.

== Areas within Whittleford Park ==
Haunchwood includes remnants of ancient woodland that used to span Barpool Valley. It is full of silver birch, willow, coppiced hazel, oak, ash, holly and blackthorn. In spring it is carpeted with wild garlic and bluebells. The woods are home to varied wildlife such as squirrels, jays, foxes, green woodpeckers, muntjac deer and rabbits.

Vale View And Hawthorn Common, once devoted to clay holes, are now areas for sport, recreation. They are set among meadowland, abundant with butterflies and bees feeding on the wild flowers and grasses.

Gorse Valley contains one of the largest areas of original bluebell woodland in the park, and an area of gorse that has countrywide importance.

Barpool Valley Barpool and Whittleford brooks run through the centre of the park, sustaining the wetland habitats of the flood plain. The marshlands considered are one of the park's main assets.

== Development of the site ==
In 2006 Nuneaton and Bedworth Borough Council gave permission for part of the Whittleford Park site to be used for housing.

Whittleford Park is classified as a Site of Importance for Nature Conservation (SINC) in the Heart of England.

For the past 10 years the park - now owned by Nuneaton and Bedworth Borough Council - has used a small group help to look after the park. The group has both a Facebook page as well, as a blog for those interested in getting involved.
