= Giles Goschen, 4th Viscount Goschen =

British politician (born 1965)

The Right Honourable The Viscount Goschen
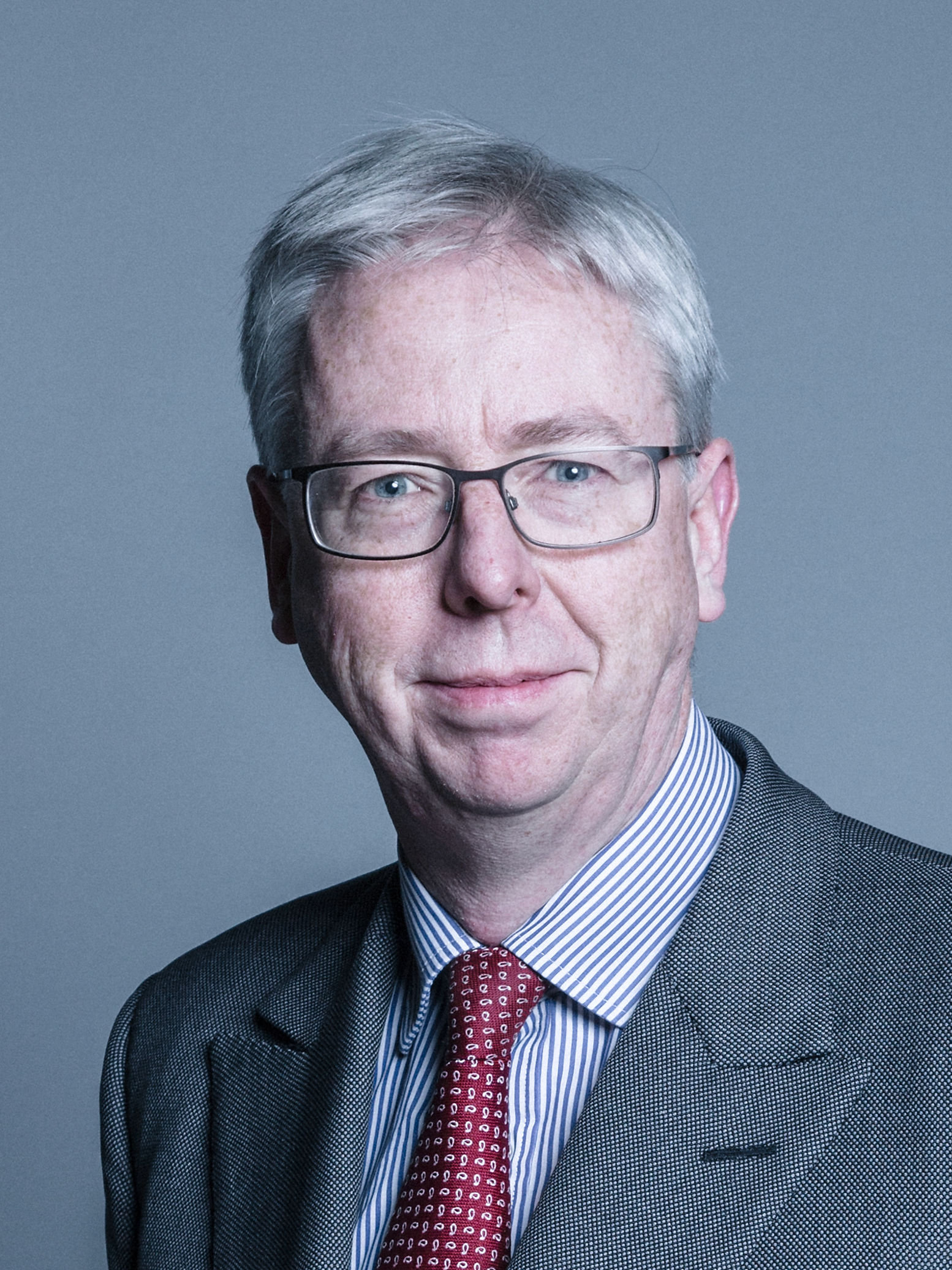

Parliamentary Under Secretary of State for Transport
- In office 20 July 1994 – 2 May 1997
- Prime Minister: John Major
- Preceded by: The Lord MacKay of Ardbrecknish
- Succeeded by: Gavin Strang (as minister of state)

Lord-in-waiting Government Whip
- In office 22 April 1992 – 20 July 1994
- Prime Minister: John Major
- Preceded by: The Earl Howe
- Succeeded by: The Lord Lucas of Crudwell

Member of the House of Lords Lord Temporal
- Incumbent
- Life peerage 5 June 2026
- Elected Hereditary Peer; 11 November 1999 – 29 April 2026
- Election: 1999
- Preceded by: Seat established
- Succeeded by: Seat abolished
- Hereditary peerage 15 July 1988 – 11 November 1999
- Preceded by: The 3rd Viscount Goschen
- Succeeded by: Seat abolished

Personal details
- Born: 16 November 1965 (age 61)
- Party: Conservative

Giles John Harry Goschen, 4th Viscount Goschen, Baron Hawkhurst (born 16 November 1965), is a British Conservative politician.

Goschen is the son of John Goschen, 3rd Viscount Goschen, by his second wife Alvin England. He was educated at Heatherdown School, near Ascot in Berkshire, and Eton. He succeeded his father in the viscountcy in 1977 at the age of eleven. After a brief stint as a city stockbroker he spent time in Zambia with his future wife Sarah Horsnail to work for a conservation agency, but returned to Britain.

Goschen served under John Major as a Lord-in-waiting from 1992 to 1994 and as Under Secretary of State for Transport from 1994 to 1997. In 1999 he was among the Conservative hereditary peers elected to remain in the House of Lords after the passing of the House of Lords Act 1999, the youngest chosen by any party group. In May 2026, it was announced that he was to be given one of 26 new life peerages, returning him to the House of Lords after the coming into force of the House of Lords (Hereditary Peers) Act 2026.

In 2010, he lived in Sussex with his wife and three children.

Coat of arms of Goschen family
Coronet A coronet of a Viscount Crest On an Arrow fesswise a Dove wings endorsed all proper Escutcheon Argent a Heart fired and transfixed with an Arrow bendwise and point upwards Gules in chief two Anchors erect Sable Supporters Dexter: A Sailor; Sinister: a Private of the Royal Marines, both proper; each holding in the exterior hand a Flagstaff of the last therefrom flowing a Banner Argent charged with a Pale Gules thereon an Anchor cabled and erect Or Motto Pacem ("For peace")

Political offices
Preceded by Steven Norris; Robert Key; The Lord MacKay of Ardbrecknish	Under-Secretary of State for Transport; 1994–1997; With: Steven Norris 1994–1996; John Bowis 1996–1997	Succeeded by ?
Peerage of the United Kingdom
Preceded by John Goschen	Viscount Goschen; 1977–present Member of the House of Lords (1988–1999)	Incumbent; Heir apparent: Hon. Alexander Goschen
Parliament of the United Kingdom
New office created by the House of Lords Act 1999	Elected hereditary peer to the House of Lords under the House of Lords Act 1999; 1999–2026	Office abolished under the House of Lords (Hereditary Peers) Act 2026
