= Herbert Willison =

Member of Parliament for Nuneaton
- In office 1923–1924
- Preceded by: Henry Maddocks
- Succeeded by: Arthur Hope
- Majority: 3,578 (9.9%)

Personal details
- Born: c. 1872 Cosgrove, Northamptonshire
- Died: November 30, 1943 Knowle, West Midlands
- Party: Liberal
- Other political affiliations: Liberal National
- Spouse: Frances Mary Pearson
- Children: 2

Herbert Willison (1872 – 30 November 1943) was an English solicitor and Liberal Party, later Liberal National politician.

== Family and education ==
Willison was born in Cosgrove, Northamptonshire. He received his education in Northamptonshire and Birmingham. He was married to Frances Mary Pearson and they had two daughters.

== Career ==
Willison was admitted as a solicitor in 1901 and practised in Birmingham. He achieved a reputation as an advocate throughout the English Midlands. He established himself with the firm of Philip Baker & Co. who were solicitors to many large enterprises and societies.

== Politics ==
=== Birmingham ===
Willison first stood for Parliament at the 1922 general election as Liberal candidate in the Birmingham Deritend division, coming third in a three-cornered contest.

=== Nuneaton ===
At the 1923 general election, Willison switched his candidacy to the Nuneaton division of Warwickshire. In a three-cornered contest, Willison defeated the sitting Conservative Member of Parliament (MP), Sir Henry Maddocks, by a majority of 3,578 votes with Labour in third place. Ironically, Willison and Maddocks were longstanding personal friends, the former having as solicitor instructed Maddocks as barrister to represent a number of legal cases before Maddocks became MP.

Willison was judged to have gained great popularity in Nuneaton during his brief time as MP but by 1924, after the first ever Labour government, the Tories were resurgent nationally and Britain was swinging back to two-party politics, with Labour replacing the Liberals as the main party of the left. At the 1924 general election the Conservatives re-captured Nuneaton with Willison pushed narrowly into third place by Labour. The combined Liberal and Labour vote amounted to 62% of the poll and it seems likely that in a straight fight Willison would have retained the seat.

=== 1929–1931 ===
Willison tried to regain Nuneaton at the 1929 general election. In a strange political turnaround, the sitting Tory MP, Arthur Hope finished bottom of the poll but this time it was Labour's Francis Smith who was elected as Nuneaton's MP, with Willison second.

In 1931 Willison was adopted as prospective Liberal candidate for Shrewsbury but he never contested the division. Instead Willison made his final effort to return to the House of Commons at Nuneaton again at the 1931 general election. At this election Willison had the advantage of calling himself the National Liberal candidate and stated publicly that he was a supporter of the National Government. It was however the Conservative, Edward North, who accrued the electoral authority of being identified with the National Government ousting Francis Smith from the seat with Willison some way back in third place. Willison did not stand for Parliament again.

=== Liberal or Liberal National ===
Willison seems to have been ambivalent about his position within the liberal family and its support for the National Government. He retained his initial connection with the Liberal National faction led by Sir John Simon. He became a member of the Liberal National Council, the body set up to support Simon's Liberal National group in Parliament and to form the core of the new party's organisation in the country. By 1932 however he seems to have been having doubts about the Simonites’ abandonment of the traditional Liberal policy of Free Trade. In September 1932 the official Liberal group, led by Sir Herbert Samuel were drifting away from supporting the National Government over the Ottawa Agreements. Willison attended the meeting of the executive committee of the National Liberal Federation held on 21 September 1932 as a representative of the official Midlands Liberals. The meeting passed a resolution attacking the government over Ottawa and this led to the formal distancing of the official Liberal group from the government, although they did not move across to the opposition side of the House of Commons until the autumn of 1933. In February 1933 he was still attending the meetings of the National Liberal Federation but by 1938 he was again attending the annual conference of the Liberal National Party and was that year the Chairman of the West Midlands Branch of the Liberal National Party.

== Death ==
Willison died on 30 November 1943 aged 71 years at his home in Chessets Wood, Knowle, Warwickshire.

Parliament of the United Kingdom
| Preceded by Sir Henry Maddocks | Member of Parliament for Nuneaton; 1923 – 1924 | Succeeded by Arthur Hope |
