= Reginald Fletcher, 1st Baron Winster =

British politician (1885–1961)

The Right Honourable The Lord Winster KCMG PC

Member of Parliament for Basingstoke
- In office 1923–1924
- Preceded by: Arthur Richard Holbrook
- Succeeded by: Arthur Richard Holbrook
- Majority: 348 (1.4%)

Member of Parliament for Nuneaton
- In office 1935–1942
- Preceded by: Edward North
- Succeeded by: Frank Bowles
- Majority: 5,237 (7.6%)

Minister of Civil Aviation
- In office 4 August 1945 – 4 October 1946
- Monarch: George VI
- Prime Minister: Clement Attlee
- Preceded by: The Viscount Swinton
- Succeeded by: The Lord Nathan

Governor of Cyprus
- In office 24 October 1946 – 4 August 1949
- Monarch: George VI
- Preceded by: Charles Campbell Woolley
- Succeeded by: Sir Andrew Barkworth Wright

Personal details
- Born: 27 March 1885
- Died: 7 June 1961 (aged 76) Uckfield, Sussex
- Party: Labour
- Other political affiliations: Liberal

Reginald Thomas Herbert Fletcher, 1st Baron Winster, KCMG, PC (27 March 1885 – 7 June 1961) was a British Liberal then Labour politician. He was Minister of Civil Aviation under Clement Attlee between 1945 and 1946 and Governor of Cyprus between 1946 and 1949.

== Political career ==
Following service during the First World War as a Royal Navy officer Fletcher was elected as Liberal Member of Parliament (MP) for Basingstoke in 1923 by 348 votes but lost the seat in 1924. In 1935 he was elected as Labour MP for Nuneaton. He was raised to the peerage as Baron Winster, of Witherslack in the County of Westmorland, in 1942 and made a Privy Counsellor in 1945. From 1945 to 1946 he was Minister of Civil Aviation in the government of Clement Attlee. The latter year he was appointed Governor of Cyprus, a position he held until 1949.

== Personal life ==
Lord Winster died in 1961 at the age of 76 in the Uckfield Rural District, Sussex. The peerage became extinct on his death.

Parliament of the United Kingdom
| Preceded by Arthur Richard Holbrook | Member of Parliament for Basingstoke; 1923–1924 | Succeeded by Arthur Richard Holbrook |
| Preceded by Edward North | Member of Parliament for Nuneaton; 1935–1942 | Succeeded by Frank Bowles |
Political offices
| Preceded by The Viscount Swinton | Minister of Civil Aviation; 1945–1946 | Succeeded by The Lord Nathan |
Government offices
| Preceded by Charles Campbell Woolley | Governor of Cyprus; 1946–1949 | Succeeded by Sir Andrew Barkworth Wright |
Peerage of the United Kingdom
| New creation | Baron Winster; 1942–1961 | Extinct |
