= 1967 Nuneaton by-election =

UK Parliamentary by-election

The 1967 Nuneaton by-election of 9 March 1967 was held after the resignation of Labour MP (MP) Frank Cousins.

The seat was safe, having been won by Labour at the 1966 United Kingdom general election by over 11,000 votes Labour held the seat.

== Candidates ==
- Les Huckfield for Labour was selected at a time when he was a lecturer at the University of Birmingham
- David Knox was selected for the Conservatives. He later became an MP for Staffordshire Moorlands
- The local Liberal Party association nominated Alan Meredith who had stood in the seat previously
- John Creasey nominated himself as candidate for the All Party Alliance, which he had founded
- Air Vice-Marshal Don Bennett, a former MP, was the nominee for the National Party

== Result of the previous general election ==
General election 1966: Nuneaton
Party	Candidate	Votes	%	±%
Labour	Frank Cousins	27,452	53.98	+1.20
Conservative	David S Marland	16,049	31.56	+2.48
Liberal	Alan Meredith	7,356	14.46	−3.67
Majority		11,403	22.42	−1.26
Turnout		50,857	79.68	−0.43
Labour hold		Swing	+4.22	

== Result of the by-election ==
Nuneaton by-election, 9 March 1967
Party	Candidate	Votes	%	±%
Labour	Les Huckfield	18,239	42.08	−11.10
Conservative	David Knox	14,185	32.73	+1.17
Liberal	Alan Meredith	7,644	17.64	+3.18
All Party Alliance	John Creasey	2,755	6.36	New
National Party	Don Bennett	517	1.19	New
Majority		4,054	9.35	−13.07
Turnout		43,340	67.90	−11.78
Labour hold		Swing	-5.37	
