= Johnny Best (boxer) =

Canadian/Australian boxer

Johnny Best (born in Canada) is an Australian former middleweight boxer who competed in the 1940s. Best was raised in Brisbane and had a career record of 6–1–0. 5 of his wins came by KO.
