= John Best (guard captain) =

John Best (fl. 1590s) was an Englishman who held the government post of Captain of the Yeomen of the Guard from 1592 until 1597, described as 'Champion of England' replacing Sir Walter Raleigh.
