= Mount Judd (Nuneaton) =

Hill in Nuneaton, England

- The Nuneaton Nipple
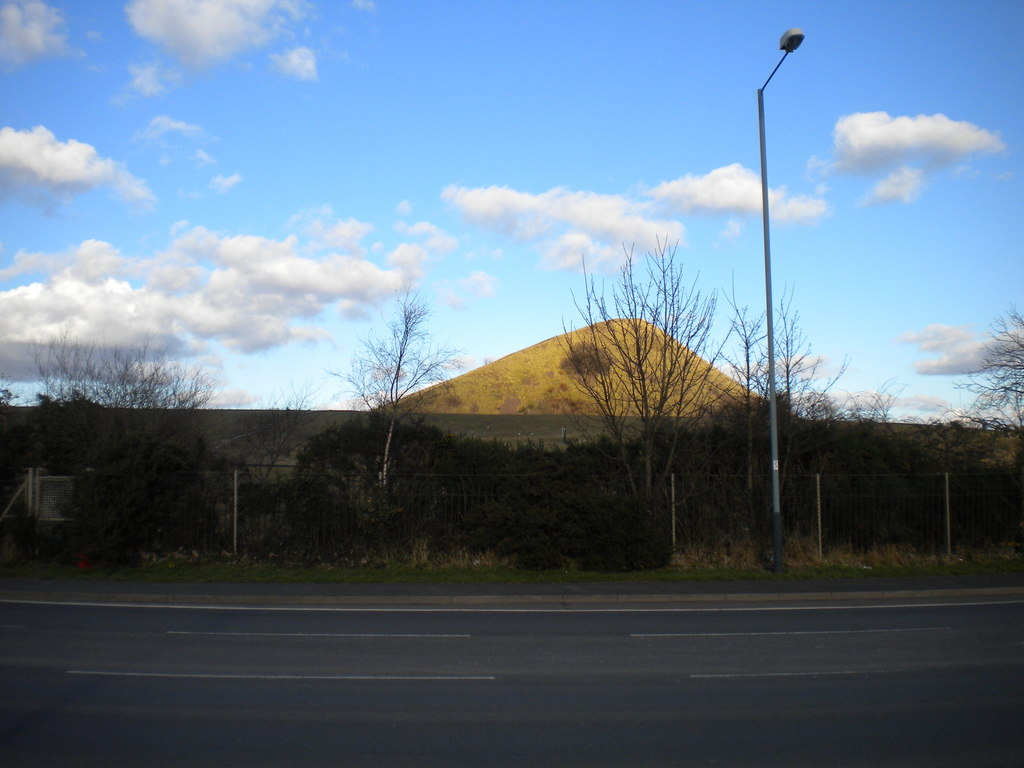
- View of Mount Judd from the south-west

Highest point
- Elevation: 158 m (518 ft)
- Coordinates: 52.5329°N 1.4873°W

Naming
- Etymology: Judkins Quarry

Geography
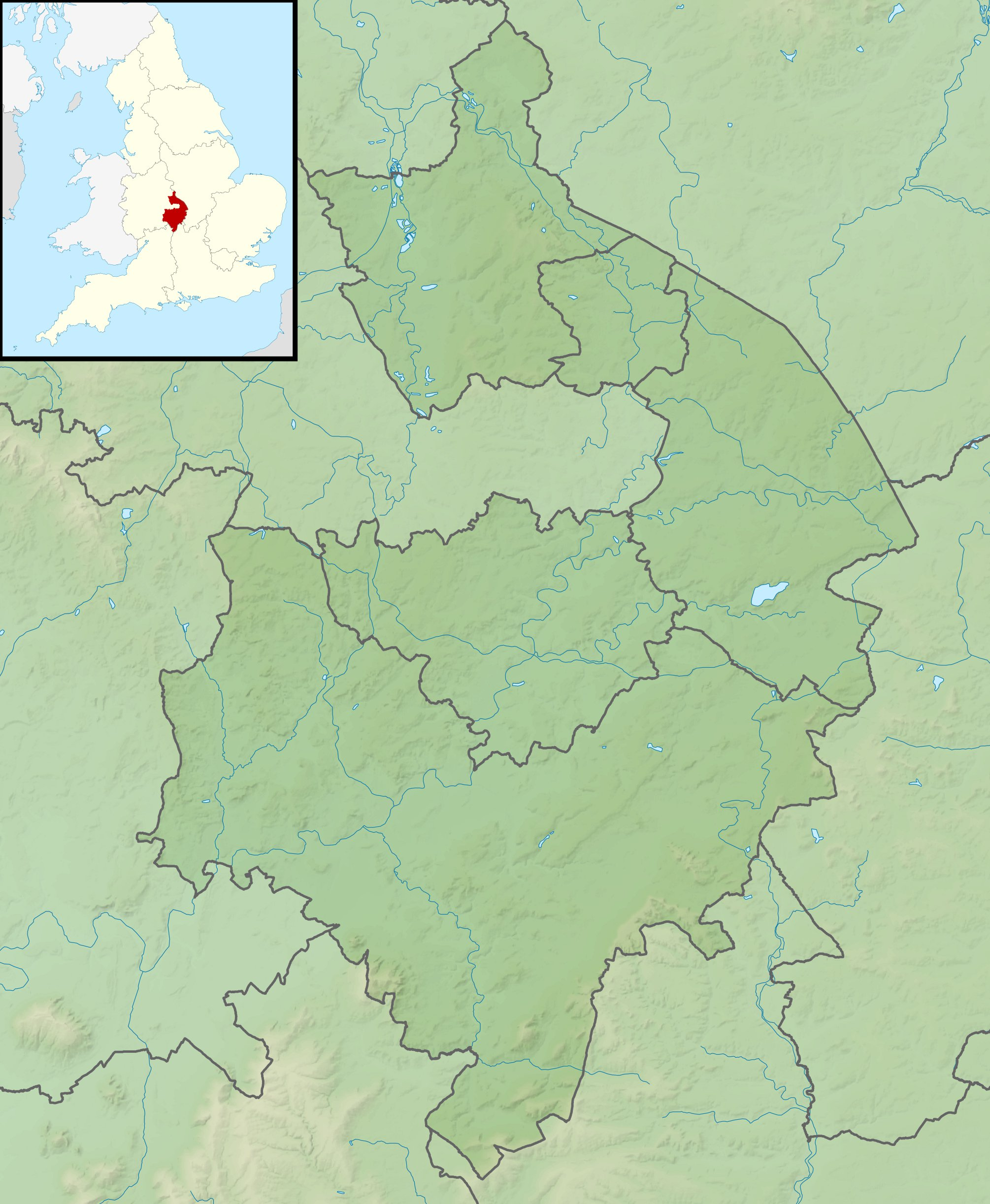
- Location within Warwickshire
- Location: Nuneaton, Warwickshire, England

Geology
- Rock age: Mid-20th century
- Mountain type: Man-made hill
- Rock type: Spoil tip

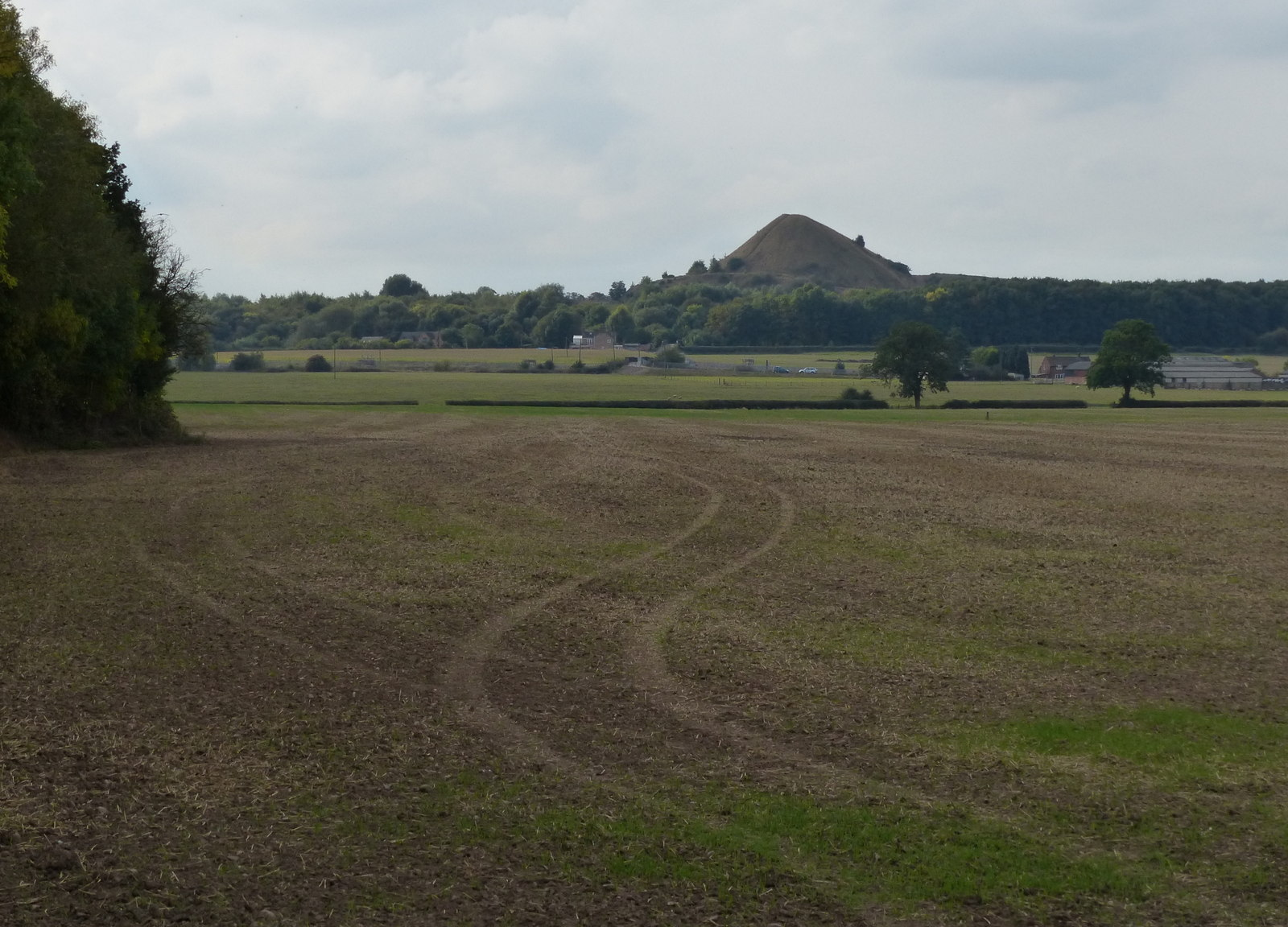
View of Mount Judd from the north-east

Mount Judd (also known colloquially as The Nuneaton Nipple) is a man made hill and landmark in Nuneaton, Warwickshire, England.

It is the former spoil tip of the Judkins Quarry, which extracted granite in the area. Mount Judd is a famous local landmark and in 2018 was voted the United Kingdom's "best landmark" in a Daily Mirror poll. At 158 metres (518 feet) altitude it is the 3,306th highest hill in England.

== History ==
There is some evidence of Paleolithic inhabitation in the surrounding area, with some worked stones being found nearby dating from 60,000 years ago. There is some evidence that the area may have been used industrially by the Romans as some potential kiln sites have been identified. From the medieval period the site was largely used for agriculture. Quarrying of granite and the extraction of clay began on the site in the mid-18th century. The site was served by the Coventry Canal and the railways which later became the Trent Valley and Birmingham–Peterborough lines. By the late 19th century brick, textiles and clothing factories occupied the site. The quarrying operation, known as Judkins Quarry, had expanded by the mid-20th century with large filter beds and a stone crushing plant in operation. Mount Judd was formed during this era as a conical-shaped spoil tip of unusable stone arising from the quarrying operation.

Mount Judd is a local landmark, visible from miles around, and is also known as the "Nuneaton Nipple". This reflects the shape of the mount and may be a derogatory term applied by residents of nearby Bedworth. After the quarry closed the heap has become grassed over and became the 16,403rd highest peak in the British Isles and the 3,306th highest in England. Warwickshire County Council purchased the former quarry for use as a landfill and it became the largest such site in Nuneaton. This use came to an end in the summer of 2009 and the site was capped off. Part of the site remains in use as a council recycling centre. In May 2018 plans were submitted to construct 400 homes on land adjacent to the site.

== Significance ==
Mount Judd is renowned locally and it was usual for youths to climb to the top, being described as a "rite of passage". The hill is privately owned and is fenced off, with access discouraged for health and safety reasons. In autumn 2017, half of a Mini car was placed on top of the hill as a prank. It was quickly removed but was noticed by many of the morning commuters on the nearby Tuttle Hill Road. In August 2018 the public were warned to stay away from the site and adjacent quarry as children as young as five had been spotted playing there near to 200-foot drops.

Mount Judd was voted the United Kingdom's best landmark in a May 2018 poll by the Daily Mirror, beating competition from the Angel of the North and Stonehenge. A few weeks afterwards the Daily Mirror reopened the poll. The poll remains live as of 2020 with Mount Judd as the top landmark.
