= Frank Cousins (British politician) =

British politician (1904–1986)

The Right Honourable Frank Cousins
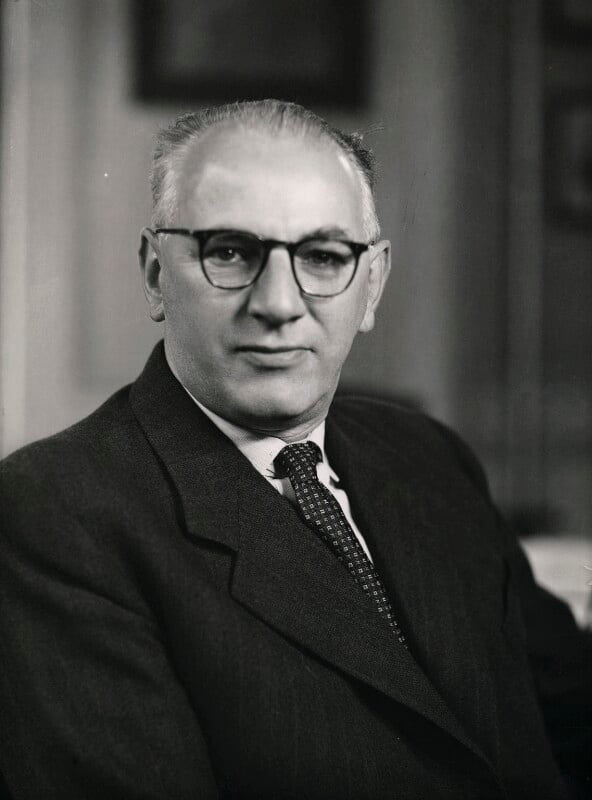
- Cousins in 1956

Minister of Technology
- In office 18 October 1964 – 4 July 1966
- Prime Minister: Harold Wilson
- Preceded by: Office established
- Succeeded by: Tony Benn

Member of Parliament for Nuneaton
- In office 21 January 1965 – 5 December 1966
- Preceded by: Frank Bowles
- Succeeded by: Les Huckfield

Personal details
- Born: 8 September 1904 Bulwell, Nottinghamshire, England
- Died: 11 June 1986 (aged 81)
- Party: Labour

Frank Cousins PC (8 September 1904 – 11 June 1986) was a British trade union leader and Labour politician.

He was born in Bulwell, Nottinghamshire. His father was a miner and Frank followed him into this industry in 1918, joining the Yorkshire Miners' Association. However, after five years he became a lorry driver, originally driving coal, and then in 1931 as a long-distance lorry driver, transporting meat between Scotland and London. He became a member of the road transport section of the Transport and General Workers' Union (TGWU), of which he became a full-time official in Doncaster in July 1938. He was appointed National Secretary of Road Transport (Commercial) Group in October 1948, contested the TGWU Assistant General Secretaryship in 1948 and 1955, securing the position on the latter attempt. He was also elected to the Labour Party's National Executive Committee in the same year, but resigned in March 1956.

Cousins was appointed acting General Secretary of the TGWU in February 1956, due to the death of Jock Tiffin. He was elected General Secretary in May 1956 and held the position until 1969. From 1956 to 1969, he was a member of the General Council of the Trades Union Congress and was President of the International Transport Workers' Federation from 1958 to 1960 and 1962 to 1964.

Cousins played a significant role in helping Harold Wilson become leader of the Labour Party and served in Wilson's cabinet as Minister of Technology after the October 1964 general election. Cousins carried little influence in Wilson's cabinet and resigned on 11 June 1966 to protest against a Government-backed law freezing incomes and prices. His appointment as a Minister is notable, for he is one of only two post–Second World War Ministers (the other being Patrick Gordon Walker) to have been appointed to the role without being either a Member of Parliament or a member of the House of Lords. He was also made a Privy Counsellor in 1964.

He was elected Member of Parliament for Nuneaton at a by-election in January 1965, was re-elected in the March 1966 general election and resigned in December 1966. During this period Harry Nicholas took over as acting general secretary of the TGWU.

== Personal life ==
He married Annie Judd in December 1930; the couple had four children: John, Brenda, Michael and Frances.

Frank Cousins sat for sculptor Alan Thornhill for a portrait in clay. The correspondence file relating to the Frank Cousins bust is held in the archive of the Henry Moore Foundation's Henry Moore Institute in Leeds and the terracotta remains in the collection of the artist.

Parliament of the United Kingdom
| Preceded by Frank Bowles | Member of Parliament for Nuneaton; 1965–1966 | Succeeded by Les Huckfield |
Trade union offices
| Preceded by Jock Tiffin | Assistant General Secretary of the Transport and General Workers' Union; 1955–1956 | Succeeded by Harry Nicholas |
| Preceded by Jock Tiffin | General Secretary of the Transport and General Workers' Union (Harry Nicholas acting 1964–1966); 1956–1969 | Succeeded by Jack Jones |
| Preceded by Wilfred Beard and Joseph O'Hagan | Trades Union Congress representative to the AFL-CIO; 1959; With: Frederick Hayday | Succeeded by Claude Bartlett and Bill Webber |
| Preceded by Hans Jahn | President of the International Transport Workers' Federation; 1958–1960 | Succeeded by Roger Dekeyzer |
| Preceded by Roger Dekeyzer | President of the International Transport Workers' Federation; 1962–1965 | Succeeded by Hans Düby |
Political offices
| Preceded by Robert Carr (Minister of Technical Co-operation) | Minister of Technology; 1964–1966 | Succeeded by Tony Benn |
