= Ministry of Technology =

UK Cabinet position

Department overview
- Formed: October 1964
- Preceding agencies: Ministry of Power; Ministry of Aviation; Department of Scientific and Industrial Research
- Dissolved: October 1970
- Superseding agencies: Department of Trade and Industry; Ministry of Aviation Supply
- Jurisdiction: United Kingdom
- Minister responsible: Various incumbents, Minister of Technology

The Ministry of Technology was a department of the government of the United Kingdom, sometimes abbreviated as "MinTech". The Ministry of Technology was established by the incoming government of Harold Wilson in October 1964 as part of Wilson's ambition to modernise the state for what he perceived to be the needs of the 1960s. The pledge was included in the Labour Party's 1964 general election manifesto: "A Labour Government will .. [set] up a Ministry of Technology to guide and stimulate a major national effort to bring advanced technology and new processes into the industry."

== History ==
=== Foundation ===
Wilson chose to appoint Frank Cousins, General Secretary of the Transport and General Workers Union, who had not previously sat in Parliament. Cousins had played a significant role in supporting Wilson's campaign to become leader of the Labour Party. C. P. Snow was created Baron Snow of Leicester so that he could play the role of parliamentary secretary in the House of Lords for the ministry, a role he carried out from October 1964 until April 1966. Professor Patrick Blackett wrote an outline, "The Case for a Ministry of Technology" in September 1964 and worked with Snow, Cousins and two senior civil servants, Sir Maurice Dean and Christopher Herzig to set up the ministry from scratch.

=== Under Tony Benn ===
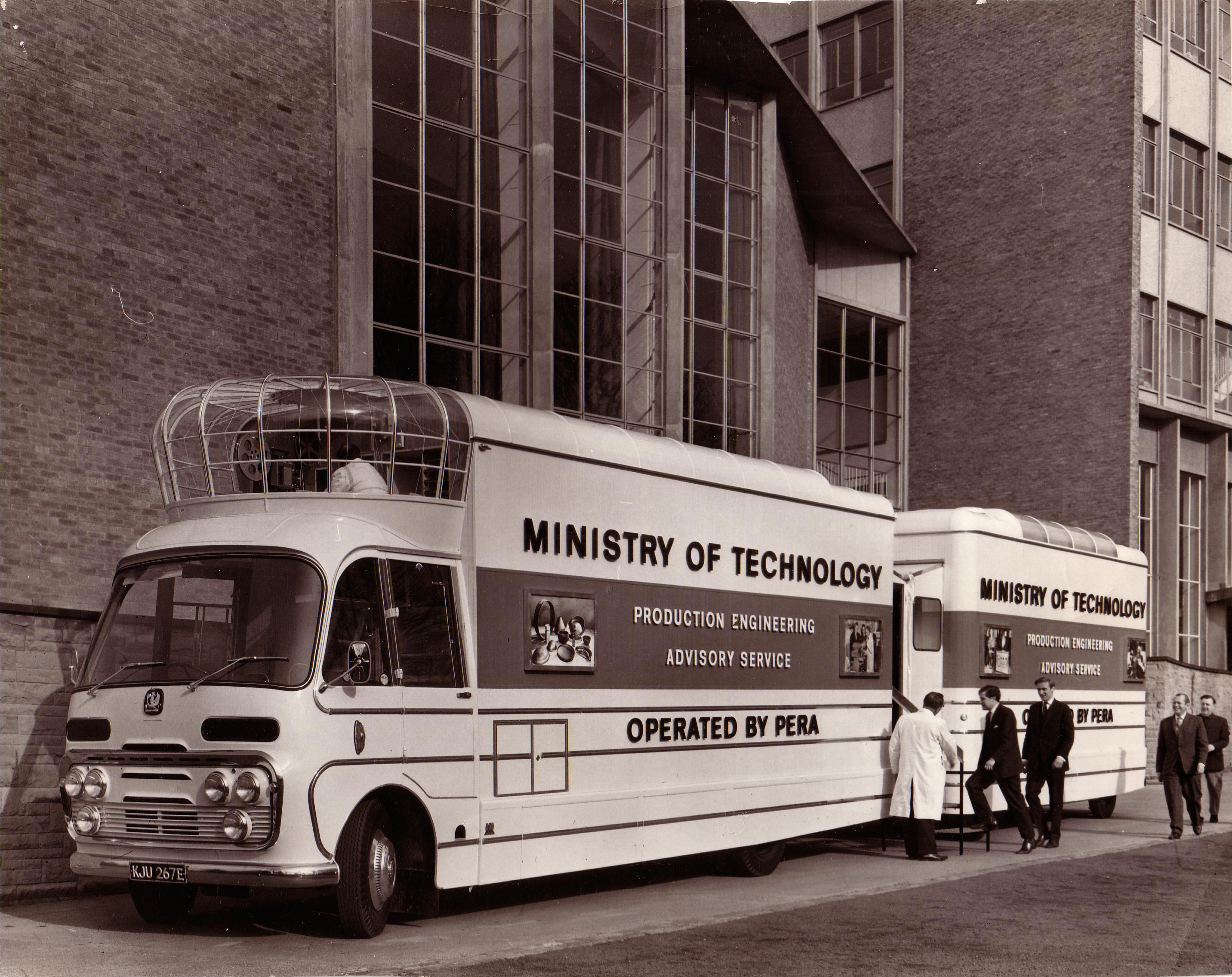
Ministry of Technology mobile cinema 1967

However, Cousins' performance in the role was disappointing, partly because Cousins was new to the political scene but also because he disagreed with Government economic policy in general. By the time of the 1966 general election, Wilson was telling Tony Benn to prepare to take over because "I can't think Frank Cousins will stay long. He's not fit anyway." In the event, Cousins resigned on 3 July 1966 when the Prices and Incomes Bill was published, and was duly replaced by Benn.

Benn was then closely associated with Wilson and worked with him to build the Ministry into a powerful voice within Whitehall. Both he and Wilson believed in government assistance to industry to adopt new technology. The Ministry gradually gained extra functions, taking over responsibility for aircraft supply from the Ministry of Aviation on 15 February 1967 and absorbing the Ministry of Power on 6 October 1969; it therefore became one of the largest and most powerful in government.

=== Demise ===
When Edward Heath took over as prime minister after the 1970 general election, he had no commitment to maintain Wilson's new Ministries. In October 1970, Heath merged the Ministry with the Board of Trade to create the Department of Trade and Industry; at the same time, the responsibilities for aerospace research, development and procurement passed to the short-lived Ministry of Aviation Supply which was disbanded in 1971 with functions passing to the Department of Trade and Industry and the Ministry of Defence.

== Ministers ==
=== Ministers of Technology ===
- 18 October 1964 – 3 July 1966: Frank Cousins (resigned)
- 4 July 1966 – 19 June 1970: Tony Benn
- 20 June 1970 – 28 July 1970: Geoffrey Rippon
- 28 July 1970 – 15 October 1970: John Davies

=== Minister of State for Technology ===
John Stonehouse	15 February 1967 – 1 July 1968
Joseph Mallalieu	1 July 1968 – 13 October 1969
Reg Prentice	6 October 1969 – 10 October 1969
Charles Delacourt-Smith	13 October 1969 – 19 June 1970
Eric Varley	13 October 1969 – 19 June 1970

=== Parliamentary Secretary, Ministry of Technology ===
Charles Snow, Baron Snow	19 October 1964 – 6 April 1966
Richard Marsh	11 October 1965 – 6 April 1966
Peter Shore	6 April 1966 – 7 January 1967
Edmund Dell	6 April 1966 – 29 August 1967
Jeremy Bray	7 January 1967 – 24 September 1969
Gerald Fowler	29 August 1967 – 13 October 1969
Alan Williams	6 October 1969 – 19 June 1970
Neil Carmichael	13 October 1969 – 19 June 1970
Ernest Davies	13 October 1969 – 19 June 1970

Nicholas Ridley was briefly a parliamentary secretary for the department in 1970 at the beginning of the Heath government.

== See also ==
- Parliamentary Under Secretary of State for Science, Research and Innovation
- National Enterprise Board
- National Research Development Corporation
