= Hampshire Field Club & Archaeological Society =

Historical and archaeological society in England

The Hampshire Field Club & Archaeological Society is a local history and archaeological society for the county of Hampshire, England, founded in 1885. It publishes an annual journal Hampshire Studies: Proceedings of the Hampshire Field Club and Archaeological Society, a biannual newsletter and occasional monographs or other longer publications.

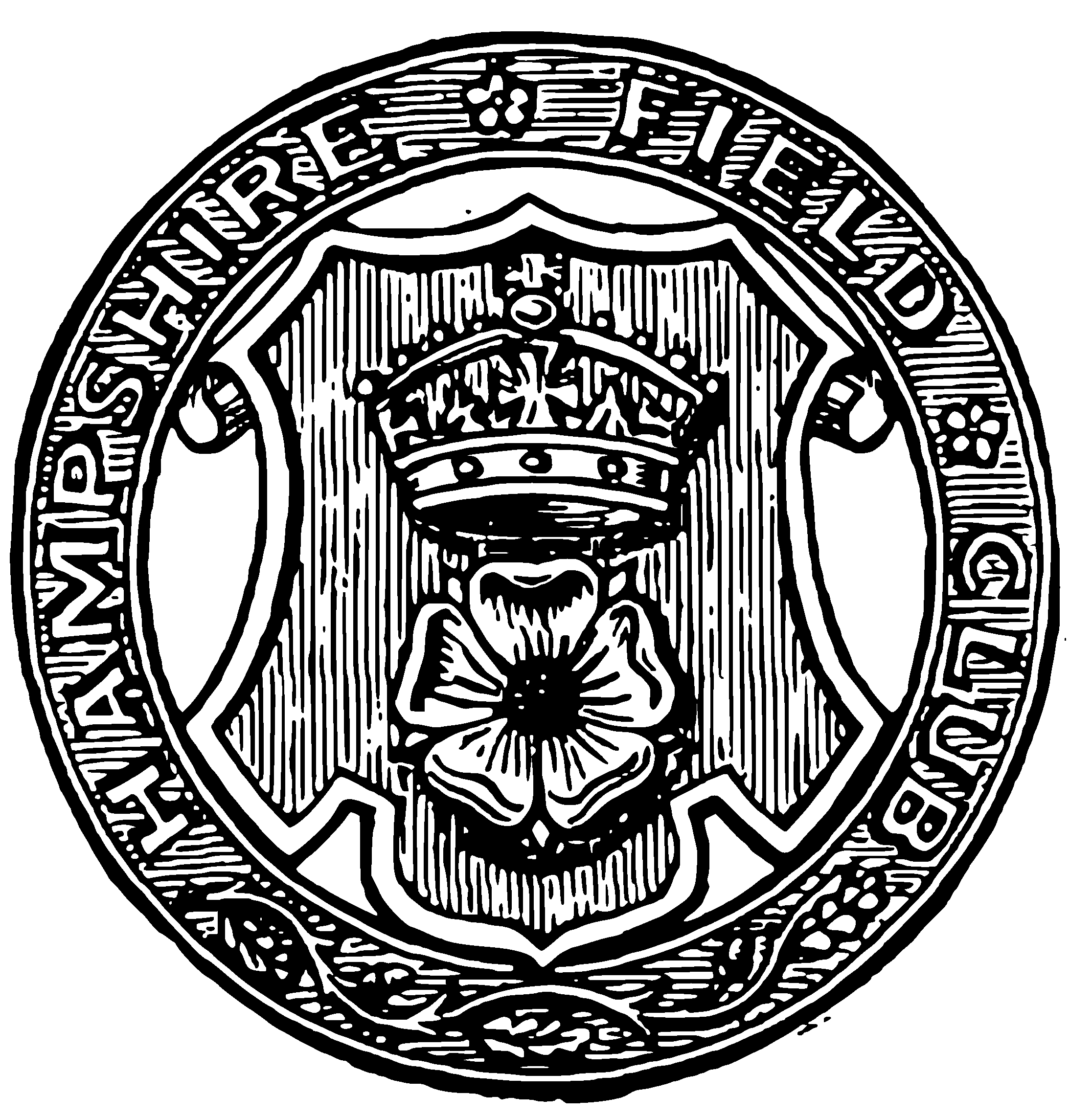
First logo of the Hampshire Field Club in use from 1885 to 1905

== History ==
The "Hampshire Field Club" was founded on the 20th of March 1885 by Thomas William Shore, William Whittaker, Thomas Woodhouse, William Eyre and Ernest Westlake during a meeting at the Hartley Institute in Southampton, forerunner of the University of Southampton. Like the other field clubs and county societies in England, the HFC was a collection of antiquarians, historians, geologists and naturalists with publications of the society consisting of variety of local topics ranging from Paleontology to modern history. More recently the society has shifted toward a focus on the county's history and archaeology with articles on geology, flora and fauna being limited, especially after the creation of separate naturalist societies. The society was one of the latest of its kind to be founded in England, with neighbouring counties having found field clubs in mid-19th century, despite this it was met with great popularity and within the first year the society's membership had grown to 110 members. In 1898 the society changed its name to "the Hampshire Field Club and Archaeological Society" which remains its official name presently.

== Publications ==
The society has produced a number of different publications, consisting of its journal, biannual newsletters, monographs and occasional papers.

=== Hampshire Studies: Proceedings of the Hampshire Field Club and Archaeological Society ===
The society has produced an annual journal since its founding in 1885 which was published in parts until 1966, after which it was replaced by single annual volumes. The name of this publication began as "Papers and Proceedings of the Hampshire Field Club" which became "Proceedings of the Hampshire Field Club" in 1958. Although its official name has remained unchanged since 1958, "Hampshire Studies" was adopted in 1996 and has since adorned every journal cover. PDF scans are available of all articles excepting those of the three years prior of present date.

=== Hampshire Papers ===
The society has published the second series of Hampshire Papers since 2015, following on from the first series which was published by the Hampshire Record Office between 1991 and 2010.

=== Monographs ===
The society has published 12 monographs since 1980 covering exclusively archaeological topics with a focus on excavations.

- The Archaeology of Hampshire, S.J. Shennan and R.T. Schadla-Hall (eds) (1980)
- The Prehistoric Settlement at Winnall Down, Winchester, P.J. Fasham (1985)
- Excavations on the Romano-British Small Town at Neatham, Hampshire, Martin Millett and David Graham (1986)
- An Anglo-Saxon Cemetery at Alton, Hampshire, V.I. Evison (1988)
- A Banjo Enclosure in Micheldever Wood, Hampshire, P.J. Fasham (1987)
- The Archaeological Site at Easton Lane, Winchester, P.J. Fasham, D.E. Farwell and R.J.B. Whinney (1989)
- Archaeology and the M3, P.J. Fasham and R.J.B. Whinney (1991)
- Romsey Abbey, Report on the Excavations, 1973-91, I.R. Scott (1997)
- Twyford Down, Hampshire: Archaeological Investigations on the M3 Motorway from Bar End to Compton, 1990-93, K.E. Walker and D.E. Farwell (2000)
- Basing House, Hampshire. Excavations 1978-1991, D. Allen and S. Anderson (1999)
- Sparsholt Roman Villa, Hampshire (Please see above.), D.E. Johnston & J. Dicks (2014)
- Selborne Priory (Please see above.) D. Baker (2015)
