= Arthur Williams (presenter) =

British television presenter

Arthur V Williams
Personal information
- Full name: Arthur Vaughan Williams
- Nationality: United Kingdom
- Born: 18 June 1986 (age 40) Cheltenham, England, United Kingdom
- Employer: Channel 4
- Website: arthur-williams.co.uk

Arthur Williams (born 18 June 1986) is a British television presenter and former Royal Marine. He uses a wheelchair as a result of a car crash.

== Early life ==
Arthur Williams was brought up in Eckington, South Worcestershire and played rugby for Prince Henry's High School in Evesham. He swam for Pershore. Williams took part in the Army Cadet National Athletics finals after winning the Midland 1,500m.

He became a Royal Marines Commando in 2004 and was awarded the King's Badge. He was posted to 42 Commando, Lima Company in Plymouth. Williams spent 18 months as a general duties Marine before specialising in signals and joining 6 Assault Squadron aboard HMS Albion.

In 2007 when returning to duty from leave in Pershore his car crashed, severing his spinal cord and paralyzing him from the waist down. Williams returned to the Marines, but left in 2009.

== Career ==
In 2013, Williams was selected by BAFTA for mentoring as a "breakthrough Brit". He presented television coverage of the 2014 Winter Olympics and 2016 Summer Olympics. He presented documentaries on aviation and military history including WWI's Forgotten Heroes, D-Day As It Happened and The Plane That Saved Britain – a documentary about the World War II de Havilland Mosquito.

Williams, Clemency Green and Adam Buxton presented The Great Escapists, a programme highlighting things to do at the weekend.

== Charity work ==
One of the original Band of Brothers after rehabilitating at Tedworth House in Wiltshire, he became a patron for Help for Heroes. He also works with the aviation charity Aerobility.

== Hobbies ==
Williams is a keen pilot, having taken up the hobby after leaving the Marines. He learned to fly through the disabled flying charity Aerobility. He holds both a National and International Private Pilot's licence.
