= Stimson Mini Bug =

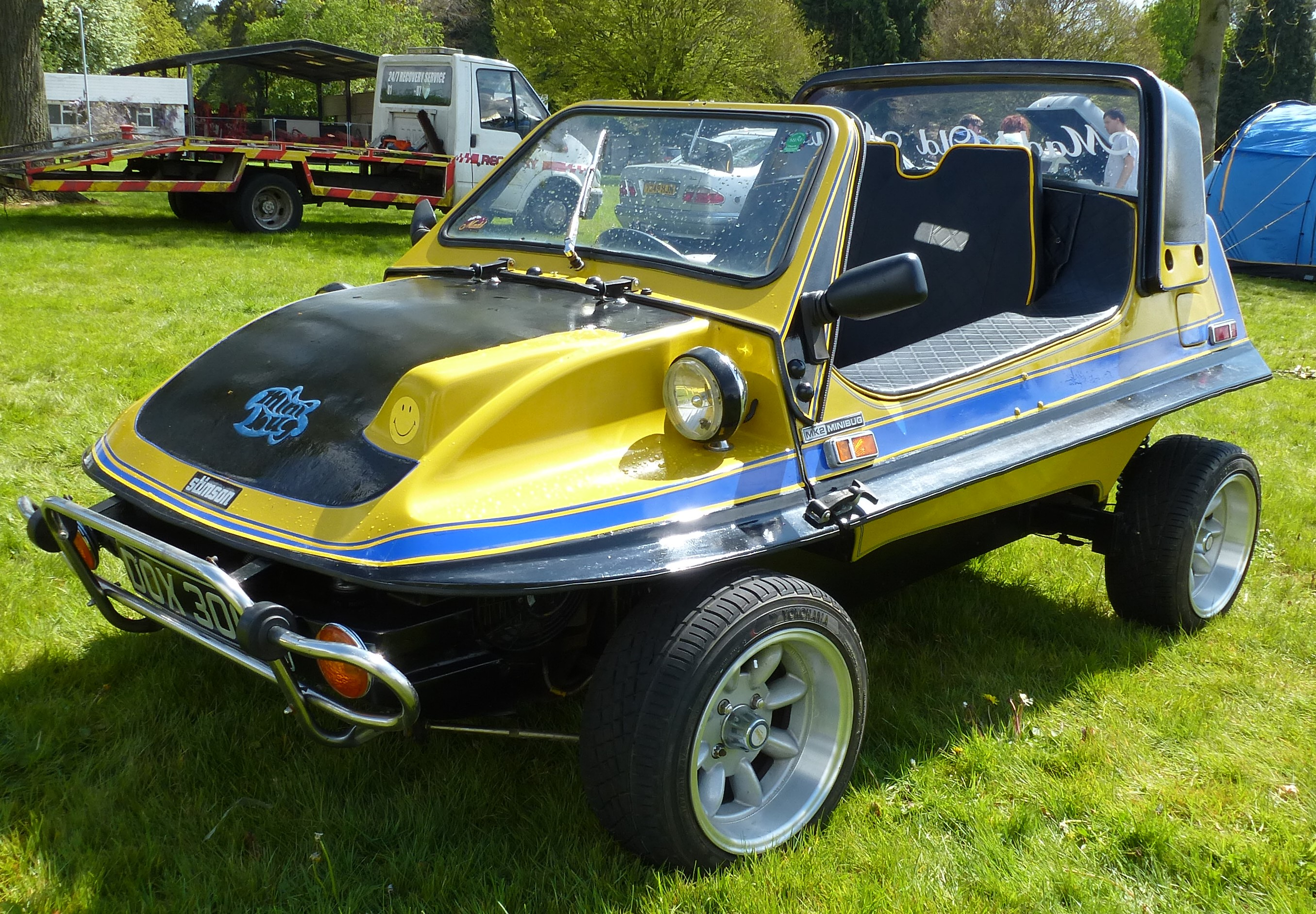
- Stimson Mini Bug Mk2

Overview
- Production: Mk1: 1970–71; Mk2: 1971–73
- Designer: Barry Stimson

Body and chassis
- Layout: Front-wheel drive

The Stimson Mini Bug is a Mini-based beach buggy-styled motor vehicle designed by Barry Stimson. The Mk1 was produced from 1970 until the following year, during which time about 20 were made. It was replaced by the Mk2 in 1971, which continued in production until 1973. About 160 Mk2s were made.

A racing version of the Mini Bug Mk2 – the CS+1 – was developed and offered for sale in 1972 by Stimson's Barrian Cars, then based in London, and later by Lainston Investment Services of Sparsholt, Hampshire. Only four were sold.
