= Prince Henry's Grammar School =

Prince Henry's Grammar School may refer to:

- Prince Henry's Grammar School, Evesham
- Prince Henry's Grammar School, Otley
