= Les Huckfield =

British politician

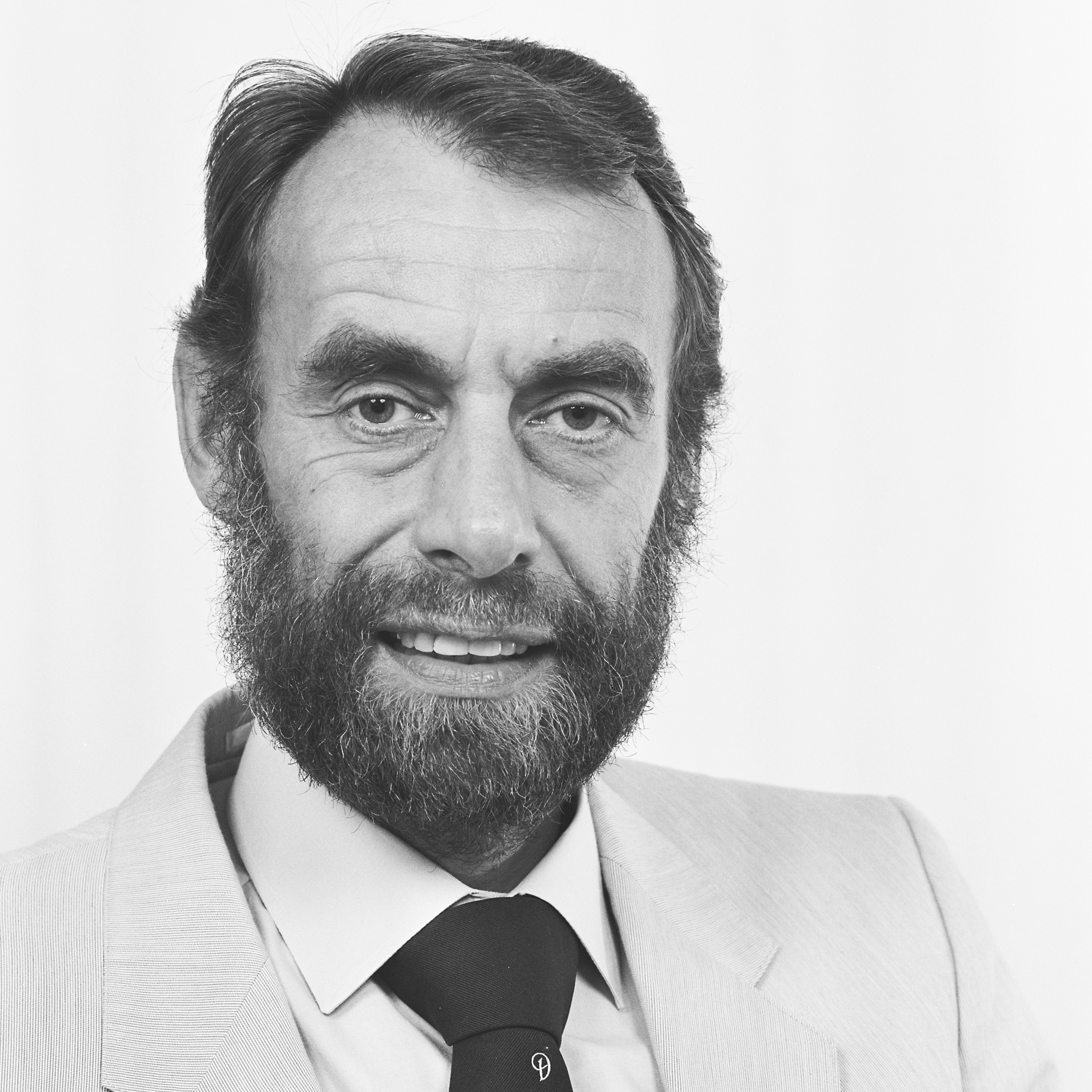
- Official MEP portrait

Member of Parliament for Nuneaton
- In office 1967–1983
- Preceded by: Frank Cousins
- Succeeded by: Lewis Stevens

Member of the European Parliament for Merseyside East
- In office 1984–1989
- Preceded by: Constituency established
- Succeeded by: Terry Wynn

Personal details
- Born: Leslie John Huckfield; 7 April 1942 (age 84)
- Party: Labour
- Education: Keble College, Oxford; Heriot Watt University; Glasgow Caledonian University
- Occupation: Academic; politician
- Website: huckfield.com

Leslie John Huckfield (born 7 April 1942) is a British Labour politician who served as member of parliament (MP) for Nuneaton from 1967 to 1983 and as a Member of the European Parliament (MEP) from 1984 to 1989.

== Early life ==
He attended Prince Henry's Grammar School in Evesham, where he won a sixth form prize, taking his A-levels in 1959. In 1960 he was given a Trevelyan Scholarship.

From 1960 to 1963, Huckfield studied at Keble College, Oxford, graduating with a degree in Philosophy, Politics and Economics, subsequently promoted to MA.

From 1963 to 1966, he worked as a lecturer in economics at Birmingham City University (then the City of Birmingham College of Commerce) whilst studying for a Master of Commerce degree, specialising in Econometrics and Statistics.

== Parliamentary career ==
Huckfield first stood for Parliament at Warwick and Leamington in 1966, but he was defeated by the Conservative incumbent John Hobson.

In 1967, at the age of 24, Huckfield was elected to parliament for the constituency of Nuneaton in a by-election following the resignation of Frank Cousins, becoming the youngest MP (the "Baby of the House"). He was Under-Secretary of State for Industry from 1976 to 1979, serving under Industry Secretary Eric Varley in the government of James Callaghan. For a time he was a member of Labour's National Executive Committee, holding the Socialist Societies seat. When Labour returned to opposition in 1979, he was opposition spokesperson on industry from 1979 to 1981. He was a founding member of the Socialist Campaign Group in 1982.

After being re-elected in four general elections, Huckfield did not stand when the constituency boundaries were changed for the 1983 general election. The Nuneaton seat was gained by the Conservative Lewis Stevens, who held it until 1992. Huckfield had been expected to contest the recreated Sedgefield seat for the 1983 general election, but instead Labour selected Tony Blair as their candidate, who was elected.

== After Parliament ==
Huckfield was then appointed as Director of the Capital Transport Campaign for the Greater London Council. In the 1984 elections for the European Parliament, he was returned as Member of the European Parliament (MEP) for the Merseyside East constituency. He was Vice Chair of Parliament's Transport Committee, and stood down in 1989.

He is now based in Auchterarder, Scotland, where he runs a funding consultancy called Leslie Huckfield Research International. He quit as a Labour member in 2003 and now supports Scottish independence.

Parliament of the United Kingdom
Preceded by Frank Cousins	Member of Parliament for Nuneaton; 1967–1983	Succeeded by Lewis Stevens
Preceded by John Ryan	Baby of the House; 1967–1969	Succeeded by Bernadette Devlin
Party political offices
Preceded by John Cartwright	Socialist societies representative on the Labour Party National Executive Committee; 1978–1982	Succeeded by John Evans
