= Peter Reynolds (archaeologist) =

British archaeologist (1939–2001)

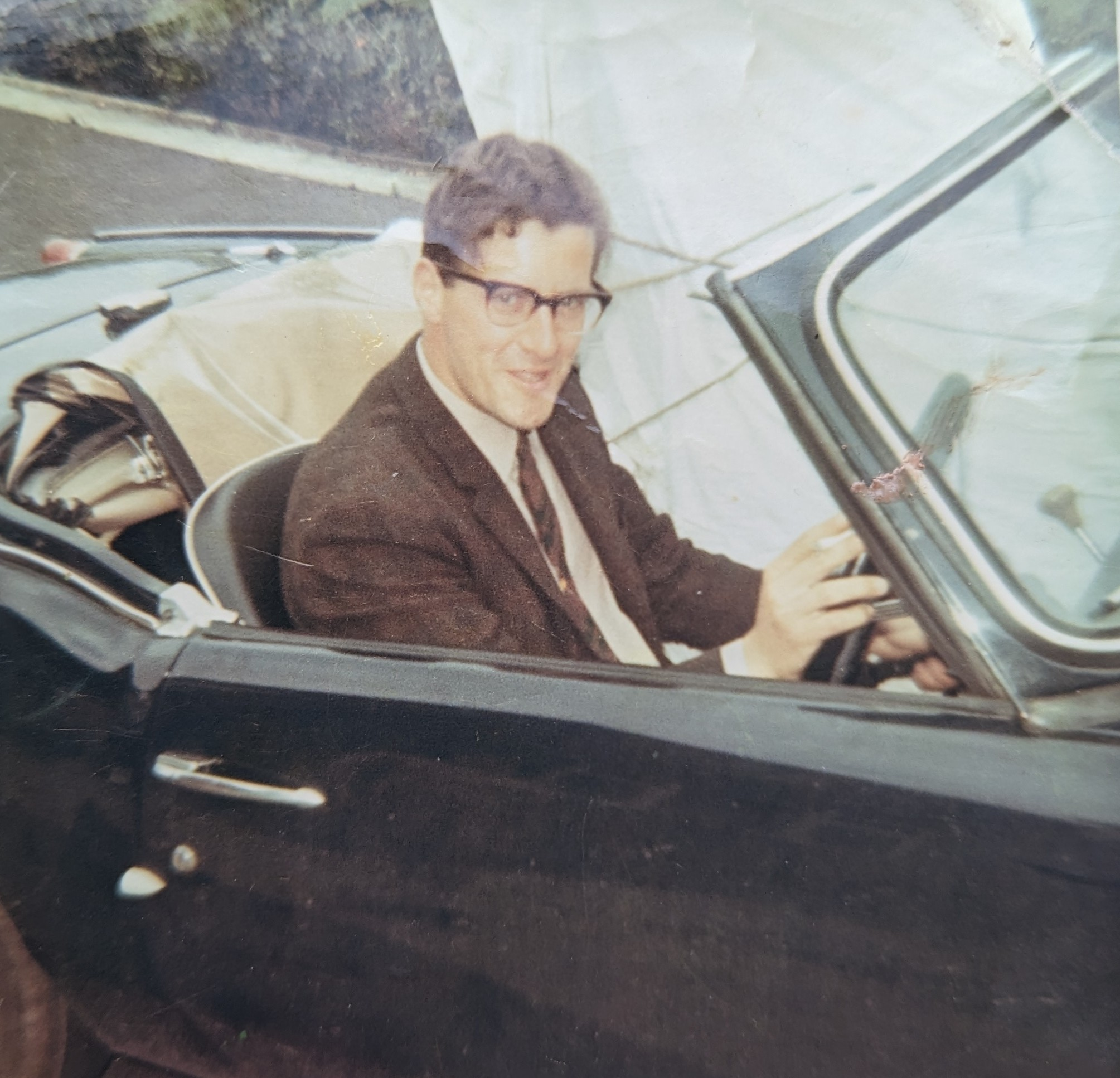
- Born: Peter John Reynolds; 11 June 1939; Shifnal, Shropshire
- Died: 26 September 2001 (aged 62)
- Education: Trinity College Dublin
- Occupation: Archaeologist
- Known for: Founder of Butser Ancient Farm

Peter John Reynolds (11 June 1939 – 26 September 2001) was a British archaeologist known for his research in experimental archaeology and the British Iron Age. His work as the first director of Butser Ancient Farm, a working replica of an Iron Age farmstead in Hampshire, made a significant contribution to our understanding of the Iron Age, and to the field of experimental archaeology.

== Early life ==
Reynolds was born on 11 June 1939 in Shifnal, Shropshire, England. He was educated at The Priory Grammar School for Boys, Shrewsbury. He read Classics at Trinity College Dublin, graduating in 1962 with a Double First. He then studied for a teaching diploma at Reading University.

== Career ==
After completing his teaching diploma, Reynolds became the classics master at Prince Henry's Grammar School, Evesham. Here, he was also a Sixth Form tutor.

=== Butser Ancient Farm ===
In 1972, Reynolds was recruited as the first director of Butser Ancient Farm, an experimental archaeology research site in Hampshire, southern England. The site began as a working Iron Age farm, reconstructing Iron Age roundhouses from UK archaeology to test current theories on Iron Age building techniques, as well as economy and culture. Reynolds' work at Butser established the current understanding of the roundhouse, showing that Iron Age roundhouses did not need a chimney or other hole for smoke to escape through, and disproving prevailing thought at the time. The projects at Butser were instrumental in establishing experimental archaeology as a legitimate archaeological discipline.

In the 50 years since its establishment, hundreds of experiments have been conducted at Butser, covering a wide range of subjects including the construction of houses, the storage of grain, the keeping of livestock, and the production and use of ancient technologies. Today, the site includes buildings from the Stone Age, Bronze Age, Iron Age, and Saxon period, including a replica Roman villa, and continues to run experiments and educate the public.

During his time at Butser, he also appeared on various episodes of the Channel 4 television series Time Team. The 6th episode of Series 9, in which he appeared, is dedicated to him, as he died after filming but before it aired.

== Personal life ==
Reynolds was twice married. He married Bridget in 1976. They had one daughter.

== Publications ==
Reynolds was an innovative researcher, who made a major contribution to our understanding of Iron Age life. A full list of his publications can be found at the Butser Archive.

=== Books ===
- Reynolds, Peter J. (1976). Farming in the Iron Age. Cambridge University Press. ISBN 0-521-21084-4. OCLC 1975198.
- Reynolds, Peter J. (1979). Iron-Age Farm: the Butser experiment. London, England: British Museum Publications. ISBN 0-7141-8014-9. OCLC 5836038.
- Reynolds, Peter J. (1980). Butser Ancient Farm: Impressions. Petersfield, Hampshire, England: Archaeological Research.
- Reynolds, Peter J. (1985). Iron Age Agriculture Reviewed. Council for British Archaeology Group 12. ISBN 0-9510621-0-7. OCLC 14251162.
