= Prince Henry's High School =

Secondary school in Worcestershire, England

Location
- Victoria Avenue; Evesham, Worcestershire, WR11 4QH; England
- Coordinates: 52°05′56″N 1°56′29″W

Information
- Type: Academy
- Motto: Parva Magna Crescunt (Great things from small things grow)
- Established: c. 1376; 650 years ago
- Local authority: Worcestershire
- Department for Education URN: 136469 Tables
- Ofsted: Reports
- Chair: Steve Butcher
- Headteacher: A A L Evans
- Gender: Mixed
- Age: 13 to 18
- Enrolment: 1,278
- Website: www.princehenrys.worcs.sch.uk

Prince Henry's High School, formerly Prince Henry's Grammar School, is an upper school with academy status in Evesham, Worcestershire, England. It is a co-educational comprehensive high school, in which there are about 1,280 students enrolled, aged between 13 and 18. It is situated in the north of Evesham off the A4184, near the junction with the B4624, adjacent to the north of the railway, and serves the town of Evesham and surrounding villages.

== History ==
The school is over 600 years old and was originally established as a school for the poor that was attached to Evesham Abbey. The original school was by the side of what is now the road from Merstow Green to the High Street in Evesham. The present site of the school was established in the late 19th century and is about one kilometre approximately north-north-east of the original site. The school is named after Henry Frederick Stuart, the elder brother of Charles I of England: Prince Henry died at the age of 18 years and predeceased his father King James I, thus never becoming king.

As Prince Henry's Grammar School, the school had around 500 boys and girls. In 1906 it merged with Deacle School, a charity school established with money left by John Deacle in 1709; this school was built in Port Street in 1729.

In 1973 it was renamed Prince Henry's High School, a comprehensive school. In 1993 it became a grant-maintained school, then in 1999 it became a foundation school. It is now a secondary school with the specialist designation of Language College. In 2010, plans were announced to change the school into an academy in a move to improve funding, and provide more opportunities for the pupils in the school.

== School inspections ==
The school's most recent inspection by Ofsted was in March 2024, with a judgement of Outstanding in all aspects.

== National Teaching School Status ==
In April 2014, Prince Henry's High School was selected by the National College for Teaching and Leadership (NCTL) to become a national teaching school. Teaching Schools take a leading role in recruiting and training new entrants to the profession, identifying leadership potential and providing support for other schools.

== Alumni ==
=== Prince Henry's High School ===
- Alex Gregory MBE, Team GB rower and Olympic gold medallist. Left the sixth form in 2002.
- Arthur Williams, TV presenter

=== Prince Henry's Grammar School ===
- Les Huckfield, former Labour MP for Nuneaton and MEP for Merseyside East
- Nigel Jones, Baron Jones of Cheltenham (1948–2022), Lib Dem MP 1992-2005 for Cheltenham
- William Valentine Mayneord CBE FRS (1902–88), radiologist, President of the British Institute of Radiology 1942-43 and of the International Organization for Medical Physics 1965-69
- Mark Beech, writer and rock critic
- Sir Henry Fowler (engineer) (29 July 1870 – 16 October 1938), a chief mechanical engineer of the Midland Railway and subsequently the London, Midland and Scottish Railway.

=== Former teachers ===
- Peter Reynolds, archaeologist (taught Classics).

== See also ==
- List of the oldest schools in the United Kingdom
