= Lewis Stevens =

British Conservative politician (1936–2023)

Member of Parliament for Nuneaton
- In office 9 June 1983 – 16 March 1992
- Preceded by: Les Huckfield
- Succeeded by: Bill Olner

Personal details
- Born: 13 April 1936
- Died: 15 January 2023 (aged 86)
- Party: Conservative

Lewis David Stevens (13 April 1936 – 15 January 2023) was a British Conservative Party politician.

== Life and career ==
Stevens was educated at Oldbury Grammar School, the University of Liverpool, and Lanchester College, Coventry. He carried out national service with the Royal Air Force, and then worked in the motor industry as an engineer.

Stevens was a member of Nuneaton Borough Council from 1966 to 1972.

On his second attempt, Stevens was elected Member of Parliament for the marginal seat of Nuneaton in 1983, after the Labour incumbent Les Huckfield stood down to seek another seat. His election was aided by recent boundary changes, and a substantial swing of Labour voters to the SDP. He served until his defeat by Labour's Bill Olner at the 1992 general election.

In Parliament, he was on the right wing of the party, supporting capital punishment, but did rebel on proposals to limit student grants. He served as a PPS to Colin Moynihan 1989-92 and David Heathcoat-Amory 1990–92.

After leaving Parliament, he returned to work as a management and industrial consultant.

Subsequently, he served as President of the Nuneaton Conservative Association.

Stevens died on 15 January 2023, at the age of 86.

Parliament of the United Kingdom
Preceded by Les Huckfield	Member of Parliament for Nuneaton; 1983–1992	Succeeded by Bill Olner
