= Sparsholt, Hampshire =

Village and parish in Hampshire, England

Coordinates: 51.078386°N 1.378251°W

Sparsholt
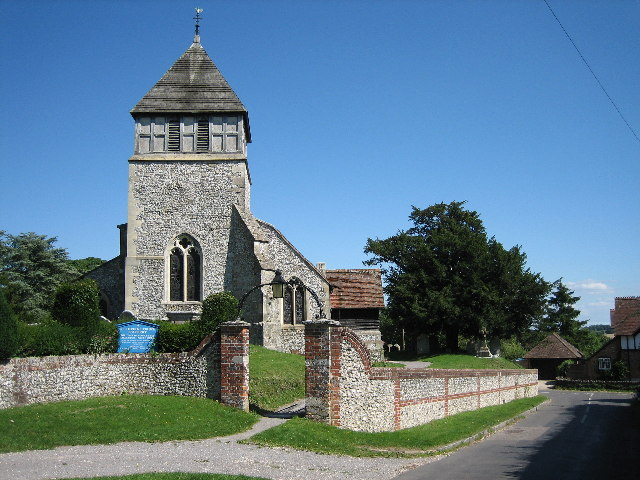
- St Stephen's parish church

- Location within Hampshire
- Population: 982 (2011 Census)
- OS grid reference: SU435312
- Civil parish: Sparsholt
- District: City of Winchester
- Shire county: Hampshire
- Region: South East
- Country: England
- Sovereign state: United Kingdom
- Post town: Winchester
- Postcode district: SO21
- Dialling code: 01962
- Police: Hampshire and Isle of Wight
- Fire: Hampshire and Isle of Wight
- Ambulance: South Central
- UK Parliament: Winchester
- Website: Sparsholt Parish Council

Sparsholt (/ˈspɑːʃəʊlt/) is a village and civil parish in Hampshire, England, 2 1/2 miles (4 km) west of Winchester. In 1908 its area was 3,672 acres (1,486 ha). The 2011 Census recorded its population as 982.

The parish also includes the hamlet of Dean, Farley Mount Country Park and Crab Wood SSSI.

== Archaeology ==
There are Bronze Age bowl and disc barrows in the parish. Just west of the village are the remains of Sparsholt Roman Villa. It was built in phases from the 2nd to the 4th century, and then abandoned. It was excavated in 1965–72. Nothing is visible at the site today, but finds from the excavations are on display in Winchester City Museum. A replica of one wing of the villa has been built at Butser Ancient Farm.

There was a village at Lainston. It is now abandoned, leaving only the ruin of its 12th-century parish church of Saint Peter, which is a Scheduled Ancient Monument.

== Toponym ==
The earliest known record of the toponym is as Speoresholt in an Anglo-Saxon charter from AD 901 now reproduced in the Cartularium Saxonicum. The name is derived from Old English and probably means "wood where spear-shafts were obtained".

A late-Saxon manuscript from about 1060–66, now reproduced in the Codex Diplomaticus Aevi Saxonici, records it as Spæresholt. A pipe roll from 1167 records it as Speresholt. Spellings from the 16th century onwards included Sparshall and Spershott.

== Parish church ==
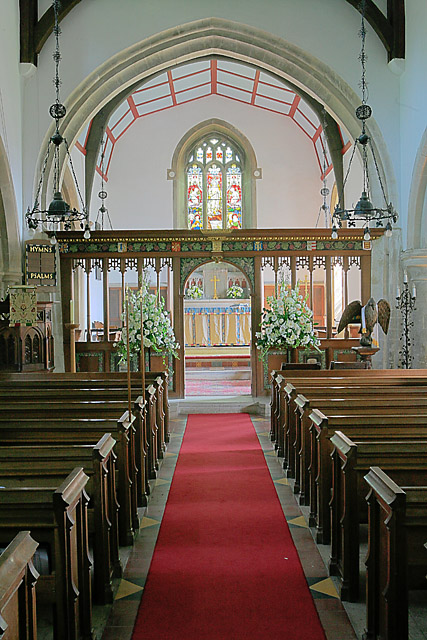
Inside the nave of St Stephen's church, looking east to the chancel

The oldest parts of the Church of England parish church of Saint Stephen in Sparsholt are also 12th-century. Early in the 13th century it was enlarged by adding a south aisle and arcade to the nave. The chancel was rebuilt in the 14th century. The chancel arch, west tower and some of the windows are 15th-century. The south doorway was added in 1631. The organ screen and lectern are also 17th-century. The church was restored in 1883 under the direction of the architect William Butterfield. It is a Grade II* listed building.

The west tower has a ring of six bells. Until the 20th century it had only four bells: a treble, third and tenor cast in 1742 by Robert Catlin of Holborn and a second cast by Thomas II Mears of the Whitechapel Bell Foundry in 1829. Mears and Stainbank of the Whitechapel Bell Foundry recast the three Catlin bells in 1905. In 1951 the same founders cast a new tenor, increasing the ring to five. In 1995 the Whitechapel Bell Foundry cast a new treble bell, increasing the ring to six.

St Stephen's parish is now one of five churches in The Downs Benefice. The others are at Chilbolton, Crawley, Littleton and Wherwell.

== Notable buildings ==
3/4 mile (1.2 km) northwest of the village is Sparsholt College, a leading land based college on the edge of the village, from which BBC Radio 4's Gardeners' Question Time series broadcasts from its "potting shed".

1/2 mile (800 m) northeast of the village is the Lainston House, a 17th-century country house that is now an hôtel.

Sparsholt Manor was the home of businessman and philanthropist, Sir Adrian Swire.

== Amenities ==
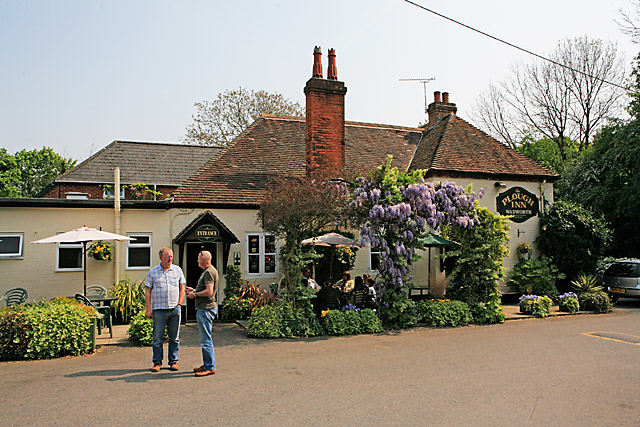
The Plough Inn

Sparsholt has a pub, the Plough Inn, which is controlled by Wadworth Brewery.

Stagecoach South bus route 7 links Sparsholt with Winchester bus station. Buses run hourly from Mondays to Saturdays. There is no Sunday or bank holiday service.

The village has a primary school, village hall, and a cricket club, whose ground is 1/4 mile (400 m) north of the village centre.

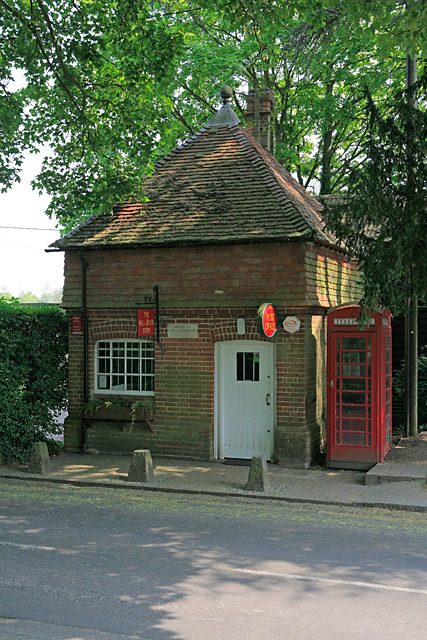
Well House store and post office

Sparsholt has a village shop with post office. This small building was built as a well house for the village, holding water drawn from the well by a wind-pump for use by the villagers. The shop retains the name. Its post office section may be one of the smallest in the United Kingdom. In 2009 villagers bought the shop under an industrial provident scheme to safeguard its future.

== Governance ==
Sparsholt is part of the Wonston and Micheldever ward which elects three councillors to Winchester City Council, as well as the Winchester Downlands ward which elects a councillor to Hampshire County Council.

== Bibliography ==
- Ekwall, Eilert (1960) [1936]. Concise Oxford Dictionary of English Place-Names (4th ed.). Oxford: Oxford University Press. Sparsholt. ISBN 0198691033.
- Johnston, David E (2002). Discovering Roman Britain. Oxford: Osprey Publishing. pp. 61–62.
- Page, William, ed. (1908). A History of Hampshire and the Isle of Wight. Victoria County History. Vol. III. London: Archibald Constable & Co. pp. 444–447. ISBN 978-0712905930.
- Pevsner, Nikolaus; Lloyd, David (1967). Hampshire and the Isle of Wight. The Buildings of England. Harmondsworth: Penguin Books. p. 609.
- Wilson, Roger (2002). A guide to the Roman remains in Britain. London: Constable. p. 113.
