= Mark Beech (writer) =

British author and journalist (1959–2020)

Mark R. Beech FRSA
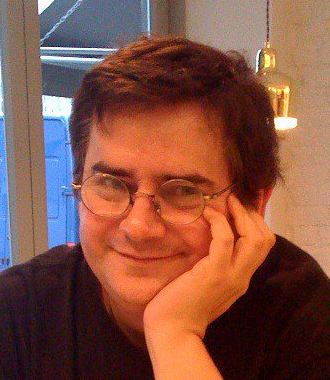
- Born: 1959
- Died: 24 April 2020 (aged 60–61)
- Education: Oxford University
- Occupations: Author, journalist, Broadcaster
- Known for: Arts & music commentary
- Website: markbeech.net

Mark R. Beech FRSA (1959 – 24 April 2020) was a British author, journalist and broadcaster. Best known for his two books on the origins of names in rock music, and for his columns about music and the arts, Beech was the editor of DANTE magazine and a fellow of the UK Royal Society of Arts. He lived in London, and died on 24 April 2020 at the age of 60.

== Early life ==
Beech was born in Birmingham, England, and attended schools in Shrewsbury and Prince Henry's Grammar School in Evesham, Worcestershire. He held a Kitchener Scholarship at St Catherine's College, Oxford, graduating with an M.A. in Philosophy, Politics and Economics in 1985.

== Journalism ==
Beech started as a newspaper reporter for Heart of England Newspapers before moving to the Birmingham Daily News. He later worked for The Sunday Times and Independent Television News (ITN) before joining Bloomberg in 1996.

As rock critic for Bloomberg Muse, the arts and culture section of Bloomberg News, Beech's weekly column appeared on the Bloomberg terminal and in BusinessWeek, and was syndicated to more than 440 newspapers and magazines worldwide. He was among the first to publish reviews from the Led Zeppelin reunion concert at the O2 in London in 2007 and from the first Rolling Stones show at the same venue in 2012. He interviewed stars as varied as Sting, Steve Miller, Adam Ant, Mary Wilson and Kevin Rowland. A decade's worth of his columns were compiled in All You Need Is Rock, published in July 2014.

In September 2015, Beech became the editor of the multilingual arts and lifestyle journal, DANTE magazine. A writer-editor for Blouin ArtInfo, he also contributed to Forbes.

=== On rock music names ===
Inspired by Beech's interviews with leading musicians, The A-Z of Names in Rock was published in 1998. The book reveals the origins of 2,400 names used by individual stars and bands. It won praise from John Peel and BBC TV called Beech "the world's leading expert on music names". Writing in The Independent, Christopher Hirst called the book "an enjoyable exploration of pop nomenclature", while Andrew Coleman reported in the Birmingham Mail that Beech's interest in names, before the age of Internet research, "stemmed from an interview with Sting, real name Gordon Sumner [who] once wore a striped black and yellow jumper which made him look like a wasp."

An illustrated companion volume, The Dictionary of Rock and Pop Names, was published in 2009.

== Other works ==
Beech wrote Passionfruit, a collection of poetry published in 1979 as part of the Outposts Modern Poetry Series edited by Howard Sergeant MBE, and two plays, Happy/Sad and Freaks Come Out at Night, performed at London's Soho Theatre in 2001 and 2005 respectively. Featuring Burn Gorman and Robert Mountford, the latter production was one of the winners of the 2005 Westminster Prize.

A regular television and radio commentator in Britain, Europe and the United States, Beech was represented by the London-based literary agent Andrew Lownie.

== Bibliography ==
- Passionfruit (1979)
- The A-Z of Names in Rock (1998)
- The Dictionary of Rock and Pop Names (2009)
- All You Need Is Rock: A Decade of Music Writing (2014)
