= Banjo enclosure =

In archaeology, a banjo enclosure is the name of a type of archaeological feature of the British Middle Iron Age. It is so named because in plan it consists of a small round area with a long entrance track leading inward from one direction. This layout gives it the appearance of a frying pan or banjo. The enclosure is defined by a low bank and ditch. The earthworks at the end of the track are sometimes turned outward, creating a funnel effect. The enclosure used to be thought of as a small farming settlement occupied around 400 BC to AD 43; however, because of the lack of finds relating to settlement it is currently thought to be a seasonal ritual centre where feasting occurred.

== Sources ==
- Winton, H. (2003). "Possible Iron Age 'banjo' enclosures on the Lambourn Downs". Oxoniensia. LXVIII.
- McOmish, Dave (July 2018) [May 2011]. Banjo Enclosures (Report). Introductions to Heritage Assets (v 1.1 ed.). Swindon, UK: English Heritage. HEAG 198.
- Hingley, R. (June 1987). Banjo Enclosure. Monuments Protection Programme (Report). Monument Class Description. English Heritage. Archived from the original on 10 April 2012.
- Fasham, P. (1987). A banjo enclosure in Micheldever Wood, Hampshire (Report). Hampshire Field Club Monograph. Vol. 5. Winchester, UK: Hampshire Field Club.
