= Chalton Windmill =

Windmill in Chalton, Hampshire, England

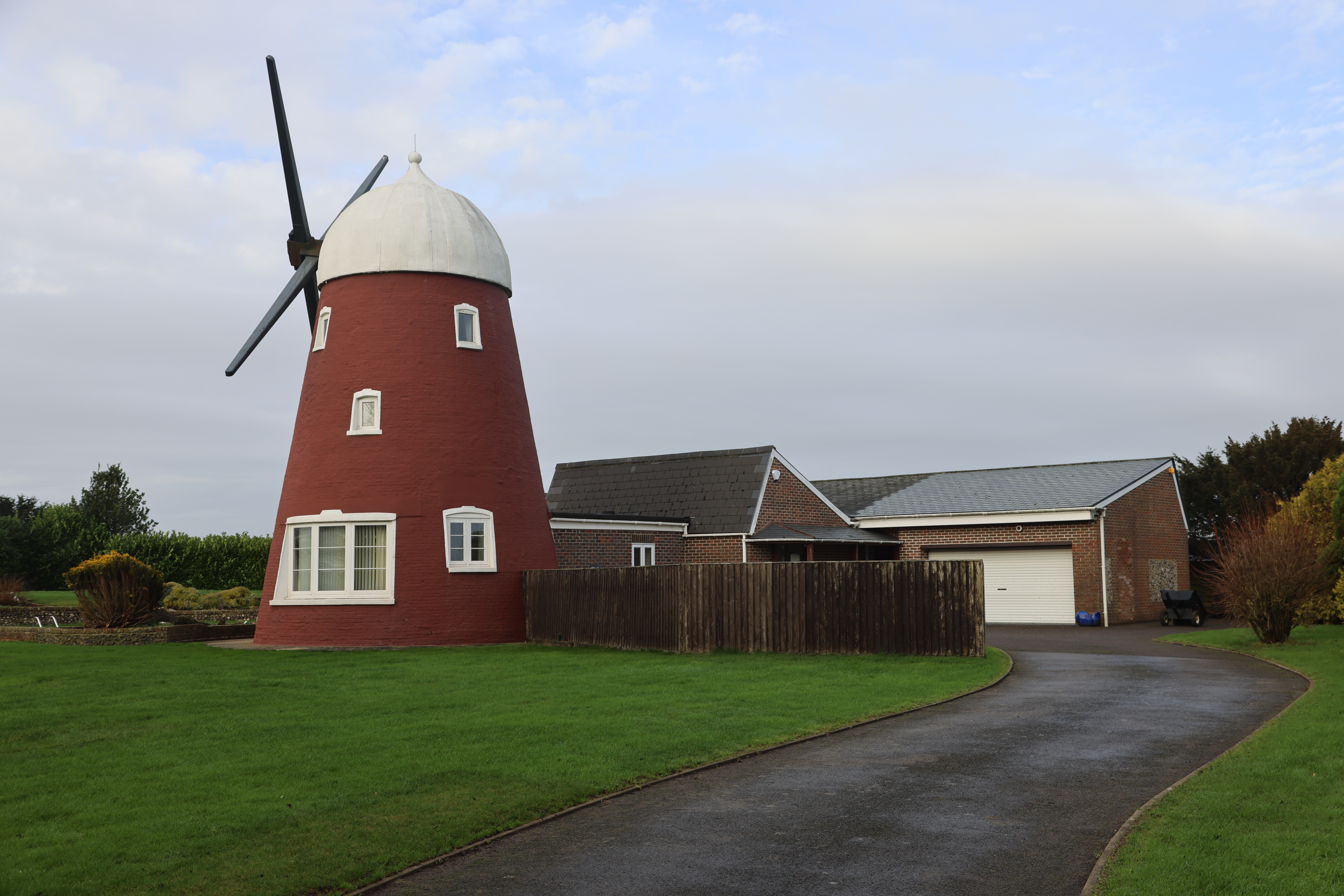
- Chalton Mill
- Interactive map of Chalton Windmill

Origin
- Mill name: Chalton mill
- Grid reference: SU 7160 1608
- Coordinates: 50.9398°N 0.9822°W
- Year built: Early 19th century

Information
- Purpose: Corn mill
- Type: Tower mill
- Storeys: Four storeys
- No. of sails: Four sails
- Type of sails: Patent sails
- Windshaft: Cast iron
- Winding: Fantail

Chalton Windmill is a Grade II listed tower mill on the top of Windmill Hill at Chalton, Hampshire, England, which has been converted to residential use.

== History ==
A mill has been recorded on the site since 1289. A windmill was marked on John Norden's map dated 1607, John Speed's map dated 1611, Joan Blaeu's map dated 1645 and John Ogilby's map dated 1675. The Chalton mill was built in the early nineteenth century. In the 1950s it was threatened with demolition but a preservation order was placed on the mill by the local council. Circa 1978 permission was given for the mill to be incorporated into a new-build house. The converted mill was awarded a Certificate of Merit by the Petersfield Society. It is currently listed among the National Heritage List for England. The building where it is situated was sold out in March 2023 for £1m.

== Description ==
Chalton windmill is a four-storey tower mill. It had four patent sails carried on a cast-iron windshaft and the cap was winded by a fantail. The millstones were driven overdrift.
