= South Leicestershire College =

College of further education in Leicester, England

- Type: Public FE
- Active: 1970–2017; merged with North Warwickshire and Hinckley College
- Administrative staff: 500+
- Students: 9,495
- Undergraduates: 80
- Location: Blaby Road, South Wigston, Leicestershire. LE18 4PH, Leicester, Leics., England; 52°34′58″N 1°07′00″W
- Website: https://www.nwslc.ac.uk/

South Leicestershire College was a general college of further education, which opened in 1970. Situated on the southern outskirts of Leicester, it drew students from across Leicestershire, but particularly from the south of the county. The college operated with a budget of around £30 million.

At the start of the academic year of 2017, South Leicestershire College merged with North Warwickshire and Hinckley College to form North Warwickshire and South Leicestershire College.

== Location ==
SLC operated predominantly out of five campuses. Wigston campus is a new multi-million pound campus in South Wigston.

=== South Wigston ===
SLC first opened its doors to learners in September 2010. The Wigston Campus was situated next to Blaby Road Park, South Wigston. The Wigston Campus featured classrooms and learning spaces, sauna, steam room, therapies suites and a boxing ring. This new campus also featured a gym, with equipment supplied by the Leicester Tigers, a café, a library, an eating area named 'The Eating Place' and an area for learners in their free-time, named 'The Lounge'.

=== King Power Stadium ===
South Leicestershire College operated its business arm, Engage, from Leicester City F.C.'s King Power Stadium. Engage predominantly offered training to businesses as well as apprenticeships. Engage's King Power Stadium Campus also featured a recruitment service aimed at finding employment for young people seeking apprenticeships.

=== Belgrave Campus ===
In 2008, the college launched its Belgrave Campus (Media Centre), located on Ross Walk. This centre hosted many of the college's media courses as well as studios for ITV Central and EAVA FM.

=== City Campus ===
South Leicestershire College's business arm, Engage, ran many of its engineering courses from its City Campus, located on Freeman's Common, Leicester.

== Academy of Sport ==
The Academy of Sport was launched by South Leicestershire College to give opportunities to young people wanting to study and play professional sport at the same time. The college was partnered with some of the sporting clubs and players in the city and delivers several development centres with them. The Football Development Centre was run with Leicester City F.C. and is led by head coach, Matt Elliott. The Rugby Development Centre is run by coaches from the Leicester Tigers. The Boxing Development Centre is run with former boxer Barry McGuigan with its training sessions held in South Leicestershire College's Boxing gym, The Weigh In. The college also runs a Mixed Martial Arts Development Centre and a Basketball Development Centre ran by Leicester Riders.
