= Bill Olner =

British politician (1942–2020)

- Olner as an MP

Member of Parliament for Nuneaton
- In office 9 April 1992 – 12 April 2010
- Preceded by: Lewis Stevens
- Succeeded by: Marcus Jones

Personal details
- Born: William John Olner; 9 May 1942 Atherstone, Warwickshire, England
- Died: 18 May 2020 (aged 78) Nuneaton, Warwickshire, England
- Party: Labour and Co-operative
- Spouse: Gill
- Education: Nuneaton Technical College
- Occupation: Councillor; engineer; politician

William John Olner (9 May 1942 – 18 May 2020) was a British Labour Co-operative politician who served as Member of Parliament (MP) for Nuneaton from 1992 until 2010. Previously, he led Nuneaton Borough Council (which later merged with Bedworth to form Nuneaton and Bedworth Borough Council).

== Education and early life ==
Olner was educated at Nuneaton Technical College and trained as an engineer. He became a shop steward, and later area secretary for the AEEU (now Unite trade union).

== Political career ==
Olner served as a Labour councillor in local government for over two decades and was council leader during the mid-1980s. He served as Mayor of Nuneaton and Bedworth in 1986–87, serving a 1-year term.

Olner was first elected to the House of Commons in 1992 as the Member of Parliament for Nuneaton. He was re-elected in the 1997 general election (majority 13,540), 2001 general election (majority 7,535) and 2005 general election (majority 2,280).

He most frequently asked questions about: mercury, the European Union (public information), funerals, satellite dishes, and skills councils. He most frequently asked questions to, and received answers to questions from, the Department for Environment, Food and Rural Affairs, the Foreign and Commonwealth Office, the Office of the Deputy Prime Minister, the Department of Health, and the Department for Work and Pensions.

Olner declared his retirement as MP for Nuneaton on 25 March 2007; he served until the 2010 general election, where Labour's new candidate, Jayne Innes, was defeated by Conservative Marcus Jones.

== Return to local politics ==
Olner decided three years after leaving Parliament to stand in the 2013 Warwickshire County Council Elections for the Arbury and Stockingford constituency in Nuneaton. Olner won the seat with 2092 votes, keeping him in office until May 2017.

Following County Council boundary changes, Olner decided to stand in the new Nuneaton Abbey County Division in May 2017 and won the seat until his death in 2020. The division is currently the safest Labour seat in Warwickshire.

== Personal life ==
Olner lived with his wife Gill, who has been a school governor in the past.

Olner died from complications of COVID-19, amid the pandemic in England, at George Eliot Hospital in Nuneaton on 18 May 2020, at age 78.

Parliament of the United Kingdom
Preceded by Lewis Stevens	Member of Parliament for Nuneaton; 1992–2010	Succeeded by Marcus Jones
