= Merseyside East and Wigan (European Parliament constituency) =

Former European Parliament constituency

- European Parliament constituency
- Boundary within North West England (1994-1999)
- Member state: United Kingdom
- Created: 1994
- Dissolved: 1999
- MEPs: 1

Prior to its uniform adoption of proportional representation in 1999, the United Kingdom used first-past-the-post for the European elections in England, Scotland and Wales. The European Parliament constituencies used under that system were smaller than the later regional constituencies and only had one Member of the European Parliament each.

The constituency of Merseyside East and Wigan was one of them.

It consisted of the Westminster Parliament constituencies of Knowsley North, Knowsley South, Leigh, Liverpool Garston, Makerfield, St Helens North, St Helens South, and Wigan.

== MEPs ==
Elected	Member	Party
1994	Terry Wynn	Labour
1999	Constituency abolished: see North West England	

== Election results ==
European Parliament election, 1994: Merseyside East and Wigan
Party	Candidate	Votes	%	±%
Labour	Terry Wynn	91,986	72.0	
Conservative	Cole Manson	17,899	14.0	
Liberal Democrats	Flo Clucas	8,874	6.9	
Liberal	Joseph Melia	4,765	3.7	
Green	Lawrence Brown	3,280	2.6	
Natural Law	Guy Hatchard	1,009	0.8	
Majority		74,087	58.0	
Turnout		127,813	24.7	
Labour win (new seat)				
