= North Warwickshire and South Leicestershire College =

- Warwickshire and Leicestershire; England

Information
- Type: Further Education College
- Established: 2017
- Principal & Chief Executive: Marion Plant OBE
- Gender: Coeducational
- Age: 16+
- Enrolment: c.26,000
- Website: www.nwslc.ac.uk

North Warwickshire and South Leicestershire College is a Further Education College with main campuses in Nuneaton, Hinckley, Harrowbrook and Wigston. The college offers apprenticeships, full-time, and part-time further and higher education courses. It was formed at the start of the academic year in 2017, when North Warwickshire and Hinckley College merged with South Leicestershire College.

== Campus locations ==
The college has five campuses and a Digital Skills academy located at Coventry University Technology Park:

- Nuneaton Campus – located on Hinckley Road, Nuneaton
- Hinckley Campus – located on Lower Bond Street, Hinckley,
- MIRA Technology Institute (MTI) – located on MIRA Technology Park, Nuneaton
- Harrowbrook Campus – located on Harrowbrook Industrial Estate, Hinckley
- Wigston Campus – located on Blaby Road, South Wigston
- Digital Skills Academy (DSA) – located at Coventry University Technology Park, Coventry

== Midland Academies Trust ==
The Midland Academies Trust (MAT) is an independent charitable organisation established by one the institution's predecessors, North Warwickshire & Hinckley College, a Department for Education approved academy sponsor, to support local schools.
