= Windmill Hill, Hampshire =

Hill in Hampshire, England

Coordinates: 50.9400°N 0.9825°W

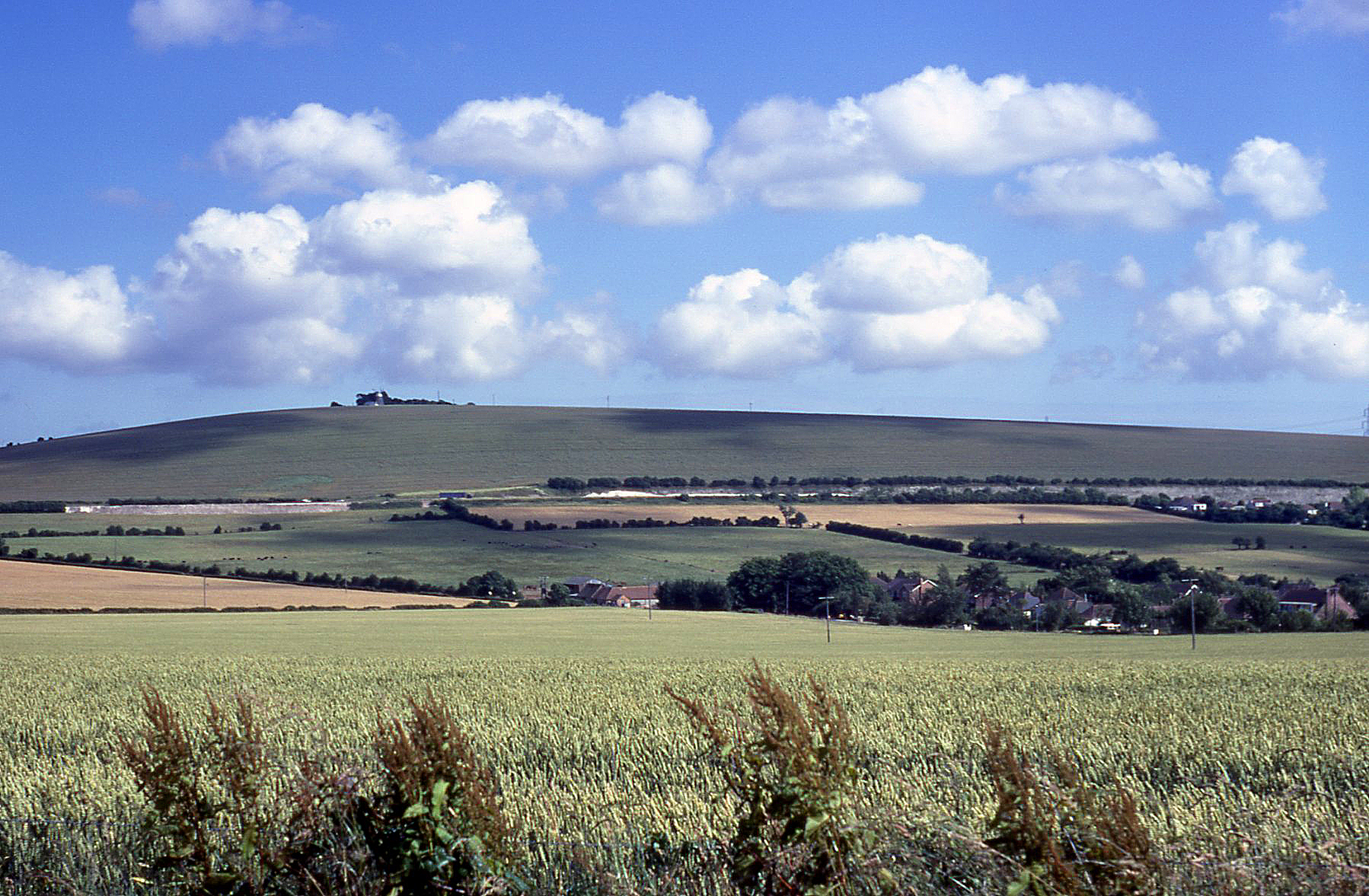
Windmill Hill viewed from the northwest

Windmill Hill is a chalk hill running alongside the A3(M) in the East Hampshire district of Hampshire, England, overlooking Chalton to the east, and Clanfield to the west. It measures 193 metres above sea level and is named so because of Chalton Windmill which sits upon its summit. This windmill is a Grade II listed building which lay derelict until the late 1970s, when it was restored and converted into a private residence.

On its northern slopes at Bascomb Copse sits Butser Ancient Farm, which moved there in 1991. The hill has numerous footpaths some of which lead to the small village of Blendworth and then to Horndean to the south, and Queen Elizabeth Country Park and Butser Hill, which is well within walking distance to the north.
