= North Warwickshire and Hinckley College =

Location
- Hinckley Road (Nuneaton) Lower Bond Street (Hinckley); Nuneaton Hinckley, Warwickshire Leicestershire, CV11 6BH (Nuneaton) LE10 1QU (Hinckley); England; 52°31′49″N 1°26′55″W

Information
- Type: Further Education College
- Established: 1996
- Closed: 2017; merged with South Leicestershire College
- Local authority: Warwickshire
- Department for Education URN: 130836 Tables
- Ofsted: Reports
- Gender: Coeducational
- Age: 16+
- Enrolment: c.26,000
- Website: www.nwslc.ac.uk

North Warwickshire and Hinckley College was a Further Education College with main campuses in Nuneaton and Hinckley. The college offers apprenticeships, full-time, and part-time further and higher education courses.

== History ==
The college began in 1910 as the Nuneaton Technical College and the Nuneaton School of Art, with the technical college catering mainly to mining students. In 1913, the college moved to a larger building containing a laboratory, lecture room, drawing room, and handicraft room, only for the college to close between 1914 and 1919 due to the First World War. When the college reopened after the war, it changed its structure to include general education courses. The college relocated again in 1923, becoming the County Mining and Technical School in 1932. The size and scope of the education offered progressed in the next two decades. In 1952 the art school was amalgamated with the college to form the Nuneaton Technical College and School of Art, and in 1958 the main campus was relocated to Hinckley Road, where it remains.

The college was subsequently renamed North Warwickshire College of Technology and Art until the merger with Hinckley College to become North Warwickshire and Hinckley College in 1996.

At the start of the academic year in 2017, North Warwickshire and Hinckley Colleges merged with South Leicestershire College to form North Warwickshire and South Leicestershire College.

== Campus developments ==
- New Hinckley Campus: In September 2011, the College opened a new Hinckley Campus located on Lower Bond Street in the town centre. The £13m campus housed the college's Creative Arts provision.
- Engineering Centre: In September 2011, a £1.5 million investment from Warwickshire County Council funded the development of a new engineering facility at the college's Nuneaton Campus. The Advanced Engineering Centre had workshop space, conference facilities, and classrooms, as well as specialist equipment.
- Harrowbrook Construction Centre: The Construction Center was home to the college's brickwork, carpentry, environmental technologies, painting and decorating, and forklift truck engineering departments.
- MIRA Technology Institute

== Campus locations ==
The college had three campuses:

- Nuneaton Campus – located on Hinckley Road, Nuneaton
- Hinckley Campus – located on Lower Bond Street, Hinckley,
- Harrowbrook Campus – located on Harrowbrook Industrial Estate, Hinckley

== Higher education ==
The college ran over 30 Higher Education and professional courses working with several universities.

== Midland Academies Trust ==
The Midland Academies Trust (MAT) is an independent charitable organisation established by North Warwickshire & Hinckley College, a Department for Education approved academy sponsor, to support local schools.

== Notable alumni ==
- Bill Olner, Member of Parliament for Nuneaton (1992–2010)
- Gareth Edwards, Film Director (Godzilla)
- Cold War Steve, artist
