= Terry Wynn =

British politician (born 1946)

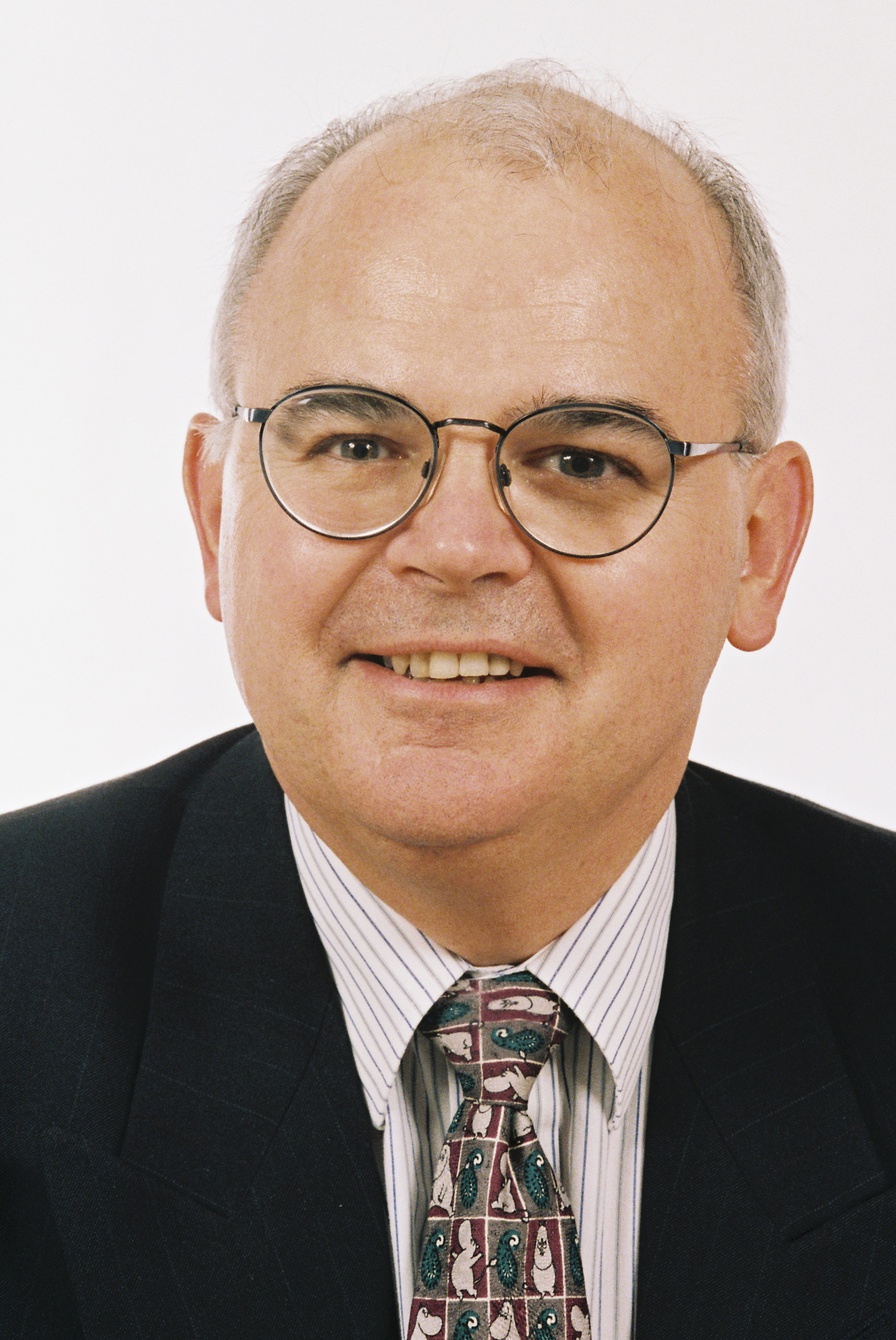

Terence Wynn (born 27 June 1946) is a former British politician who served in the European Parliament.

== Early life and education ==
Born in Wigan, Wynn was educated at Leigh College, Riversdale College, Liverpool Polytechnic and Salford University. He became a marine engineer, with a Combined Chief Engineer's Certificate and later obtained a Master of Science Degree.

== Career ==
He was a Member of the European Parliament; he held the European Constituency of Merseyside East from 1989 to 1994, Merseyside East and Wigan from 1994 to 1999, and from 1999 until 2006 represented the North West counties of England with a 7 million population, one of the 3 Labour Party Members out of a total of 9 MEPs for the region under a proportional voting system.

From 1999 to 2004 he held the position of President of the Budget Committee in the European Parliament, which oversaw the, then, €110bn budget of the EU. In this role he was Head of Parliament delegations when negotiating the budget with the Finance Ministers of the 25 Member States which occurred several times each financial year. Responsible also for Parliamentary reports on the future financing of the EU.

He was vice-chairman to the president of the European Parliament (therefore de facto chairman) of the Parliament's temporary committee on "Policy Challenges and Budgetary Means of the Enlarged Union from 2007-2013".

He also co-chaired the committee of inquiry into allegations of misuse of EU funds by the Palestinian Authority.

Prior to being president of the committee, he was the majority leader (i.e. co-ordinator) for his political group for 5 years. Before that he had been general Budget Rapporteur (i.e. the immember responsible for setting out Parliament's position on the budget – the lead player) for two consecutive budgets.

His special interests included reform of the Common Agricultural Policy, (he was chairman of an all-party, cross nationality grouping of MEPs which campaigned for agriculture reform), Development Aid, where he had a specific interest in South Africa and has written a Parliamentary Report on the funding of the EU Special Programme during the apartheid years.

He strongly advocated the case for nuclear power and chaired the Forum for the Future of Nuclear Energy within the European Parliament. On this subject he was invited to speak at various European gatherings, visited nuclear installations in the Czech Republic, Lithuania and Sweden, and has been a keynote speaker at a conference in Tokyo and given public lectures in Dunedin and Christchurch, New Zealand on "Nuclear Energy for a Green Future".

He also led a delegation to Bulgaria and was instrumental in raising the issue of the Kozloduy nuclear power plant in the EU.

Since Australia and New Zealand are part of the Cairns Group, campaigning for agriculture reform within the WTO, he was a vice-president of the Parliamentary delegation to these countries. He was the inaugural speaker at the Jean Monet lecture at the university in Christchurch, (followed the next year by Prime Minister Helen Clarke). He has addressed civil servants and politicians in Canberra and Wellington as well as Pretoria and Cape Town on European matters. In November 2006 he gave a public seminar at the Australian National University in Canberra. In March/April 2007 he was "European in Residence" for the EU Centres Network of New Zealand, visiting and speaking at the universities of Auckland, Waikato, Victoria University Wellington, Canterbury and Otago. He was also a keynote speaker at events to celebrate the 50th anniversary of the signing of the Treaty of Rome in Auckland, Wellington and Christchurch. Following this he was appointed Adjunct Senior Fellow at the National Centre for Research on Europe at the University of Canterbury.

In 1994 he co-authored a booklet "A guide to the Community Budget" published by the UK Local Government International Bureau and also published "The EU Budget – Public Perception and Fact".

Prior to being elected as an MEP, he joined the Merchant Navy in 1962 as an engineer apprentice, working for T & J Brocklebank, ACL, Esso and Canadian Pacific and left 12 years later with a Combined Chief Engineers Certificate.

Academically he holds a Master of Science degree in industrial relations and manpower studies, from the University of Salford. He is also a Methodist local preacher, author of two books, Onward Christian Socialist and Where Are The Prophets?. both about faith and politics.

He was deputy chairman of the board of the trustees for Methodist Church Purposes and was also a trustee for Action for Children, at the time the largest children's charity in the UK. He also chaired the trustees of The Rock Bus Community Project. He served as a board member of the European Parliament's Voluntary pension Scheme and as a member of the European Commission's ethics committee.

He has also served on the central finance board of the Methodist Church and the Joint Advisory Committee for Ethical Investment.

== Personal life ==
Wynn has been married to his wife Doris since 1967. He has two adult children and four grandchildren.
