= Sparsholt Roman Villa =

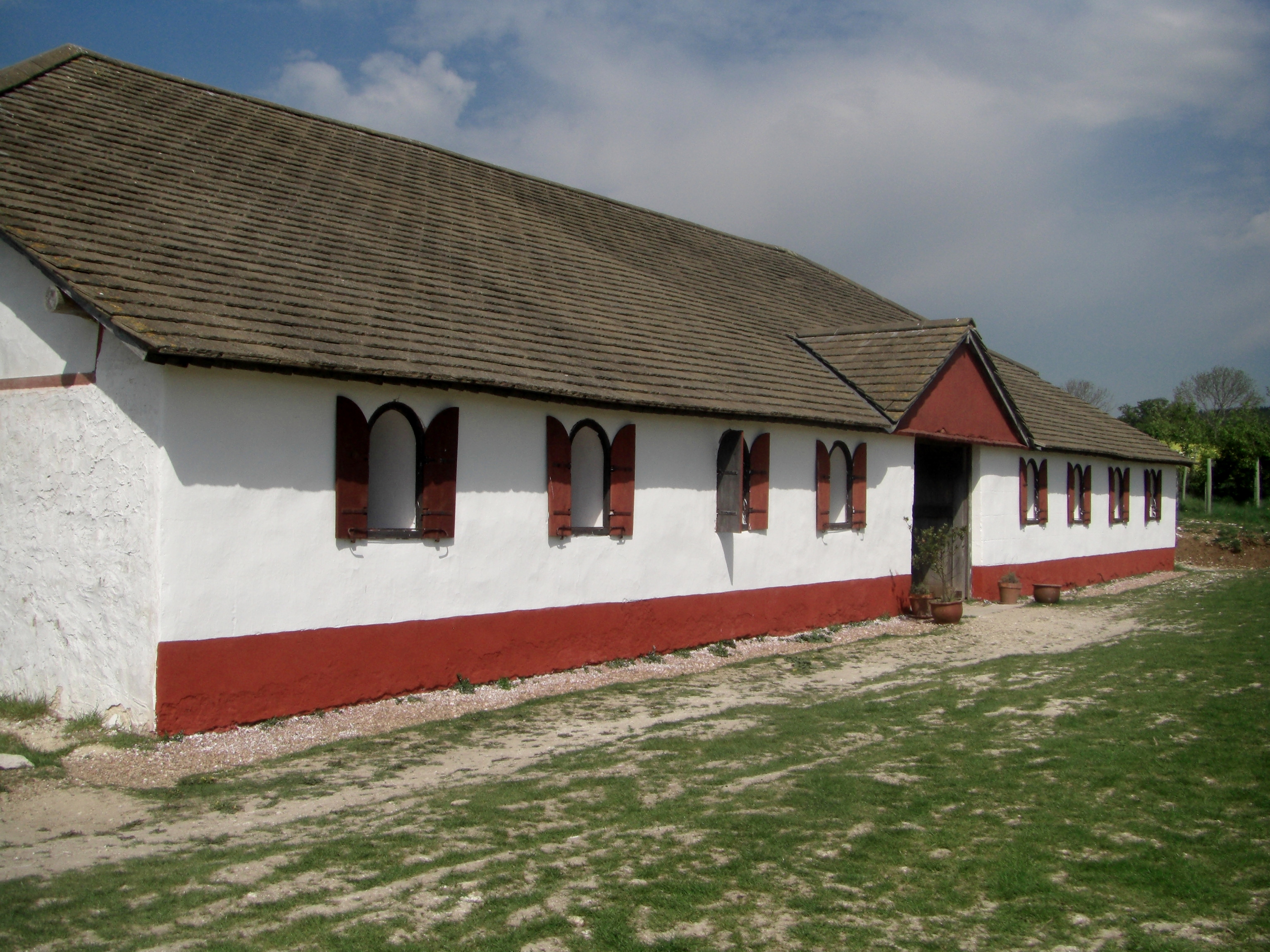
- Reconstruction of Sparsholt Roman Villa at Butser Ancient Farm

- Location within Hampshire

General information
- Location: Sparsholt, Hampshire grid reference SU415301, United Kingdom
- Coordinates: 51.0691°N 1.4095°W
- Construction started: 2nd century
- Demolished: 5th century

Sparsholt Roman Villa was a Roman villa near the village of Sparsholt, Hampshire, England. It was constructed in phases from the 2nd to the 5th century, and then abandoned. It was excavated in 1965–72. Nothing is visible at the site today, but finds from the excavations are on display in Winchester City Museum, and one wing of the villa has been reconstructed at Butser Ancient Farm.

== History ==
The earliest known house uncovered at Sparsholt was a single-aisled farmhouse probably built in the 2nd century. It may initially have been undivided internally, but by 200 AD it had been replaced by an aisled house with living rooms and a bath suite at one end. In the early 4th century a separate winged-corridor house was constructed at right-angles to the aisled house, and both buildings formed two sides of a rectangular enclosure. A barn-like structure was added on the third side of the enclosure. The fourth side contained the entrance to the enclosure which was opposite the winged-corridor house. Tessellated pavements and mosaics were added to both houses.

The last structure to be built, perhaps during the post-Roman period, was a timbered hall, outside the courtyard. This incorporated material plundered from the earlier buildings, but nothing distinctively post-Roman or early Saxon has been found on the site.

== Excavation and display ==
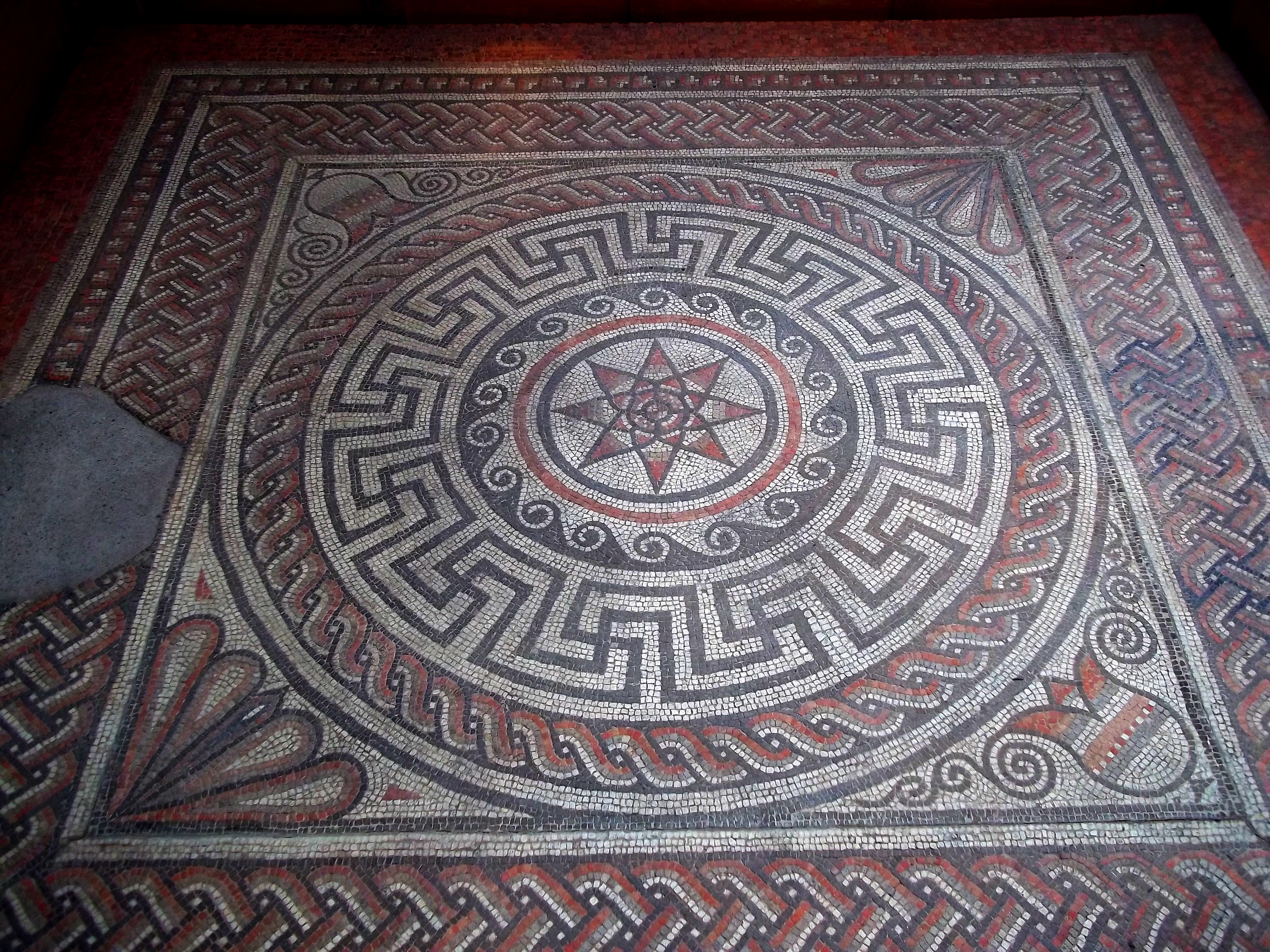
Sparsholt Villa mosaic in Winchester City Museum

The villa is located in West Wood, just west of the village of Sparsholt, Hampshire. Trial excavations were conducted in 1890 and 1895 which revealed part of the plan of the villa. Excavations, which were led by David E. Johnston, were conducted from 1965–72. Nothing is visible on the ground today.

On display in Winchester City Museum is a near-intact 4th-century geometric mosaic taken from the aisled building. Also on display in the museum is a fresco containing a female portrait within a tondo, which may show the mistress of the house. Another fresco is a painted version of a guilloché – a type of pattern common in mosaics but extremely rare in Roman frescos.

At Butser Ancient Farm near Petersfield is a reconstruction of the aisled villa building. The building was constructed by volunteers and includes a functioning hypocaust system.
