= Butser Ancient Farm =

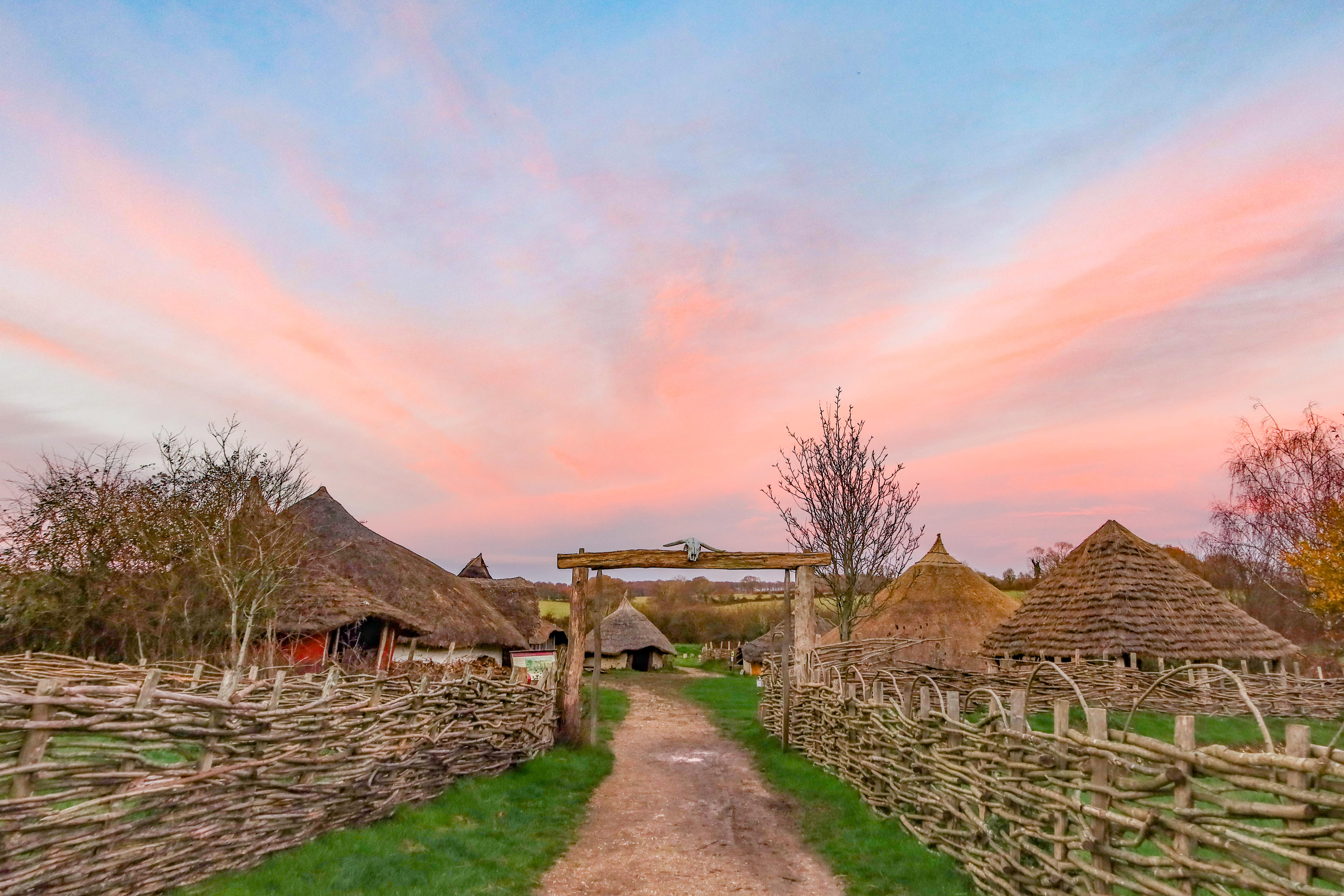
- Butser Ancient Farm's reconstructed Iron Age village

- Location within Hampshire
- Established: 1970
- Location: Windmill Hill, Hampshire
- Coordinates: 50°56′35″N 0°58′37″W
- Type: Archaeological open-air museum
- Website: www.butserancientfarm.co.uk

Butser Ancient Farm is an archaeological open-air museum and experimental archaeology site located near Petersfield in Hampshire, southern England. Butser features experimental reconstructions of prehistoric, Romano-British and Anglo-Saxon buildings. Examples of Neolithic dwellings, Iron Age roundhouses, a Romano-British villa and an early Saxon house are on display. The site is used as both a tourist attraction and a site for the undertaking of experimental archaeology. In this latter capacity, it was designed so that archaeologists could learn more about the agricultural and domestic economy in Britain during the millennium that lasted from circa 400 BCE to 400 CE, in what was the Late British Iron Age and Romano-British periods.

Founded in 1970 by the Council for British Archaeology, in 1972 they recruited experimental archaeologist Peter J. Reynolds to run the site as project director. It was initially located on the site of a Bronze and Iron Age farmstead on Butser Hill, but in 1989 relocated to Hillscombe Down, and in 1991 to Bascombe Copse on the slopes of Windmill Hill.

The farm is open to the public and runs various events throughout the year, including workshops, reenactments, as well as a regular Beltain festival. Archaeologist Mick Aston commented that "Virtually all the reconstruction drawings of Iron Age settlements now to be seen in books are based" on the work at Butser Farm, and that it "revolutionised the way in which the pre-Roman Iron Age economy was perceived".

== History ==
Butser Ancient Farm was founded in 1970 by the Council for British Archaeology: the driving force behind its foundation was the RCHME archaeologist Collin Bowen. In 1972, they recruited experimental archaeologist Peter J. Reynolds (1939–2001) as director. The farm was named after its original site at Little Butser, a northerly spur of Butser Hill, a few kilometres from Petersfield in Hampshire. In the original Bronze and Iron Ages, a farmstead had been found on Little Butser, whose occupants had farmed the valley to the north and east.

In 1976 a second site, known as the Ancient Farm Demonstration Area (AFDA), was opened at Hillscombe Down on the southern slopes of Butser Hill, about a kilometre away from the main Farm. This was primarily designed to be a public site which could act as an educational resource for schoolchildren, and it was intended that this would take away the visitor pressure from the original site, where the large numbers of visitors (at times over a thousand people turned up to open days) were getting in the way of the experimental archaeology. The first Butser Farm site at Little Butser was subsequently closed down in 1989.

In 1991 the project moved to Bascomb Copse on the slopes of Windmill Hill, Hampshire between Chalton and Clanfield, about 5 km from the original site.

Buildings at the farm include simulated pre-Roman roundhouses and a simulated Roman villa. The 'Longbridge Deverell House' was the first full-sized roundhouse to be built at the latest site, and at the time one of the largest in Europe.

After Peter's death in 2001, the site was run by his partner, Christine Shaw, for a number of years. Under her guidance, one of Peter's projects, a Roman building, was completed, resulting in the first full scale construction simulation of the wing of a Romano-British villa from Sparsholt, near Winchester. It was financed with the support of the Discovery Channel, and was filmed for a ten-part series for television.

In 2006/7, a management team was assembled, and with Christine's guidance, took over the running of the Butser Project. The management team consists of Simon Jay and Maureen Page, running the farm under the business "Butser Education CIC".

It was also in 2006 that the 'Longbridge Deverell House' started to collapse, and prompted a programme of redevelopment of the constructions across the farm. A major re-assessment of the techniques of building was undertaken. It was decided to use the opportunity to examine the accumulated information of a further 20 years of excavation evidence.

Following the dismantling of the 'Longbridge Deverell House', the replacement is based on the excavations of the roundhouse at Little Woodbury in Wiltshire. Under the leadership of David Freeman, construction started in February 2007 and finished in December, having gone through one of the wettest summers on record. A visitor centre was added in 2013.

== Buildings ==
=== Stone Age houses ===
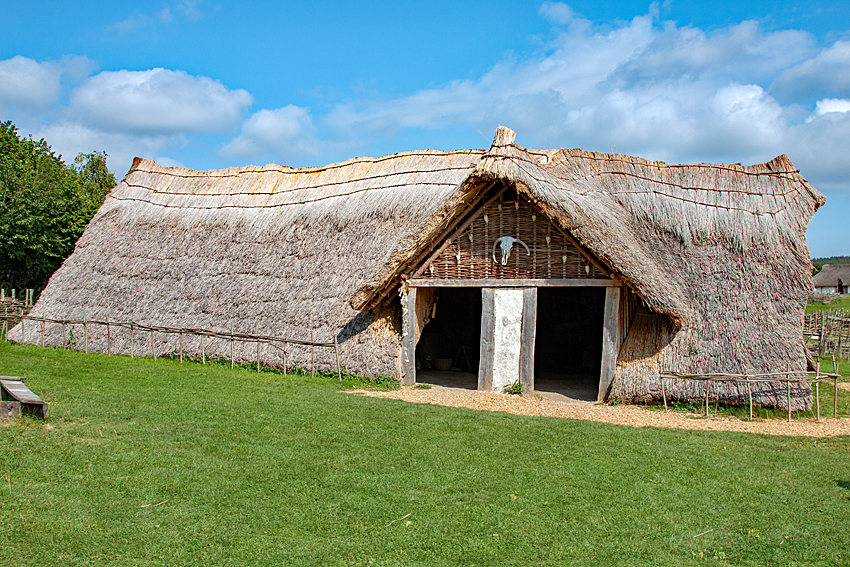
The neolithic Horton House

In 2019 the construction of the early Neolithic Horton House began, as a replacement to the previous Llandygai house. This house is based on excavations from Kingsmead Quarry, Horton, Berkshire and the house has been built in collaboration with the original excavation team; Wessex Archaeology. As this building showed minimal evidence for internal posts it has been constructed so that the roof rafters are ground fast, in order to provide additional strength to the large structure. Scots Pine, widely available in the Neolithic landscape, has been utilized in the main framework. Ash and hazel make up the mainstay of the roof timbers over which reed thatch has been laid. Noticeable features of the building are the gable ends, with one representing a typical wattle and daub feature, and the other being made with split oak planks.

In 2025, a house was constructed based on a 1996 excavation at Wyke Down, Dorset. The construction of the walls was based on an actual sample of original plaster.

=== Bronze Age house ===
In 2021 the construction of Butser Ancient Farm's first Bronze Age house began, based on excavations from Dunch Hill on Salisbury Plain. This project is working in collaboration with Operation Nightingale, an initiative to assist the recovery of wounded, injured and sick military personnel and veterans by getting them involved in archaeological investigations. The Operation Nightingale team excavated the structure in 2020 and were then involved in its experimental reconstruction at Butser. The house was completed in October 2021.

=== Iron Age roundhouses ===
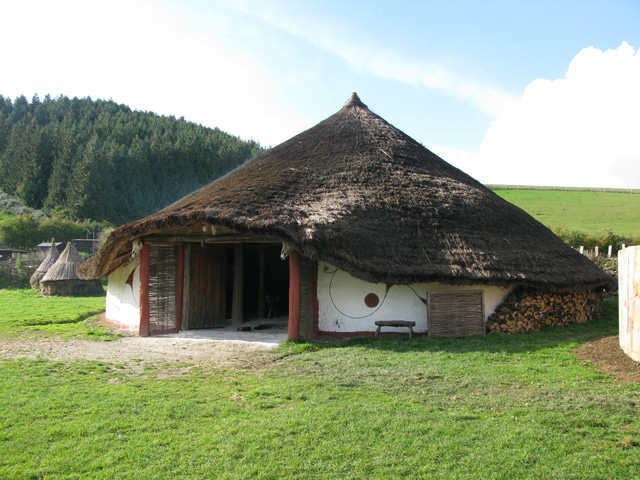
The Little Woodbury roundhouse

Situated within the Iron Age enclosure are six Iron Age roundhouse constructions.

The largest of these is the Little Woodbury roundhouse with a diameter of 14.5 m (48 ft) and a 2 ring posthole construction. Estimated material quantities to build this house include 12 t (12 long tons; 13 short tons) of oak for the frame and posts, 4 t (3.9 long tons; 4.4 short tons) of ash and elder for the rafters, 7 t (6.9 long tons; 7.7 short tons) of thatch, 1.5 t (1.5 long tons; 1.7 short tons) of hazel for the wattle walls and 20 t (20 long tons; 22 short tons) of daub.

Three houses are based on excavations from Danebury Iron Age Hillfort near Andover. These include CS14, a stake built construction with willow woven between the hazel wall stakes. CS14 has become unstable and is now being allowed to deteriorate to see the process and remains. The second Danebury house is CS1, constructed with oak plank walls in line with the evidence of a slot trench discovered in the excavations. This house is furnished with Iron Age style furnishings. Roundhouse CS20 was constructed with tightly packaged upright staves that formed part of the walls.

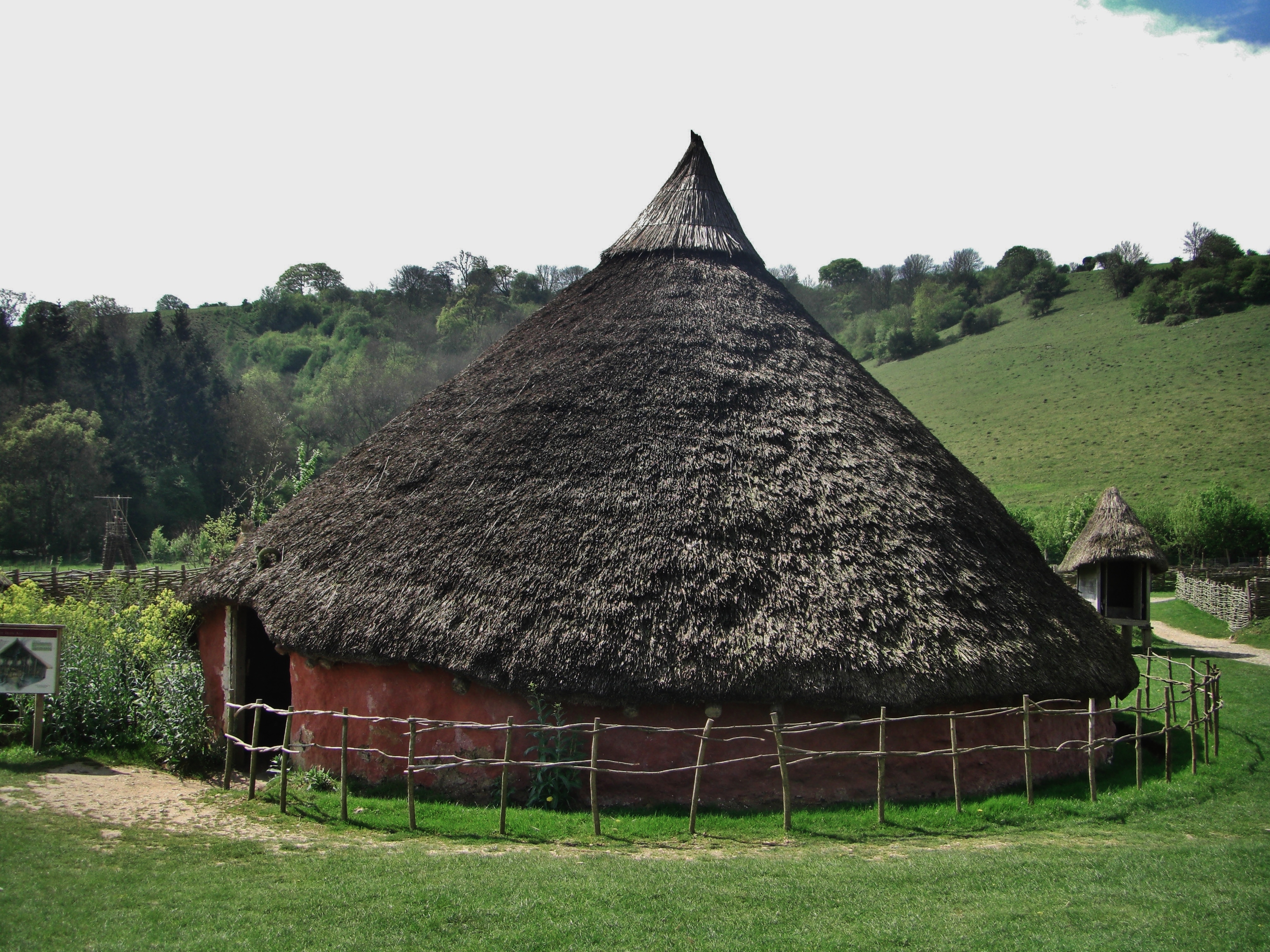
The Moel y Gerddi roundhouse

Completed in 2002, the Moel Y Gerddi Roundhouse is based on excavations from Harlech in North Wales and is constructed in a two ring style similar to the Little Woodbury Roundhouse. Unusually this house also features a back door. In 2009 the internal posts were shown to be rotten and a successful experiment was conducted in order to replace the posts in situ.

Roundhouse M74 was based on excavations from Glastonbury Lake Village and constructed to be as lightweight as possible reflecting the building constraints imposed by the marshy ground conditions of the landscape around Glastonbury. It features very thin willow woven walls and reed thatch roofs.

The Iron Age enclosure also features grain pits dug into the chalk earth, an Iron Age toilet construction, a 9 post structure and bread ovens.

=== Roman Villa ===
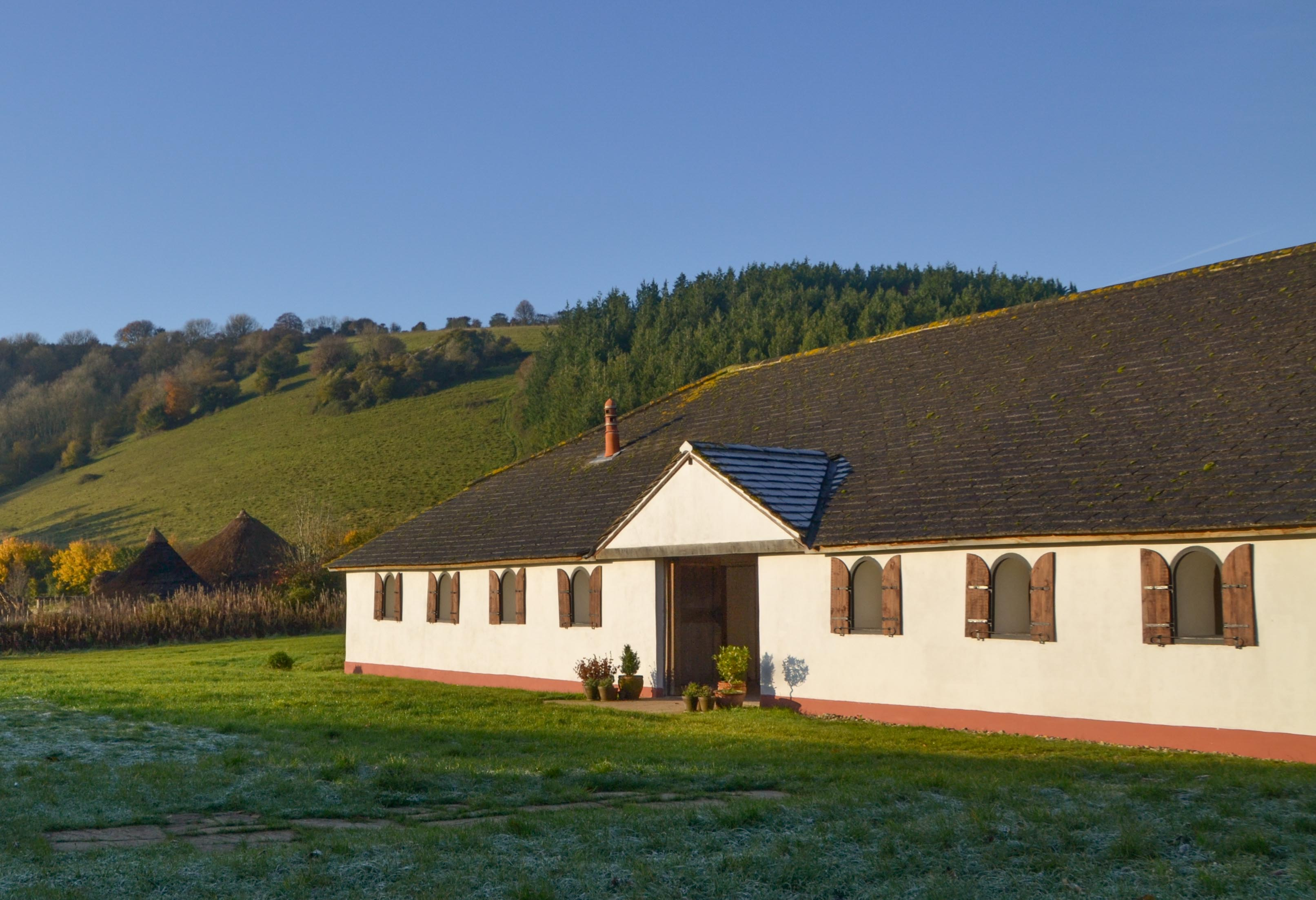
The reconstructed Roman villa

There is also a reconstructed 4th century Roman villa at the site, built in 2002-3. The construction is based on the western wing of Sparsholt Roman Villa which was excavated between 1965 and 1972. The building includes a functioning hypocaust system.

In 2017-18 the Villa was renovated including re-painting the walls based on excavated plaster remains showing original colours and patterns, and installing a replica mosaic floor in the central room. This took over 120,000 tesserae and 1000 hours. The villa has also been furnished with items representative of Roman furniture. In 2023, a formal garden was established at the front of the villa. A kitchen garden was planted at the rear.

=== Saxon houses ===
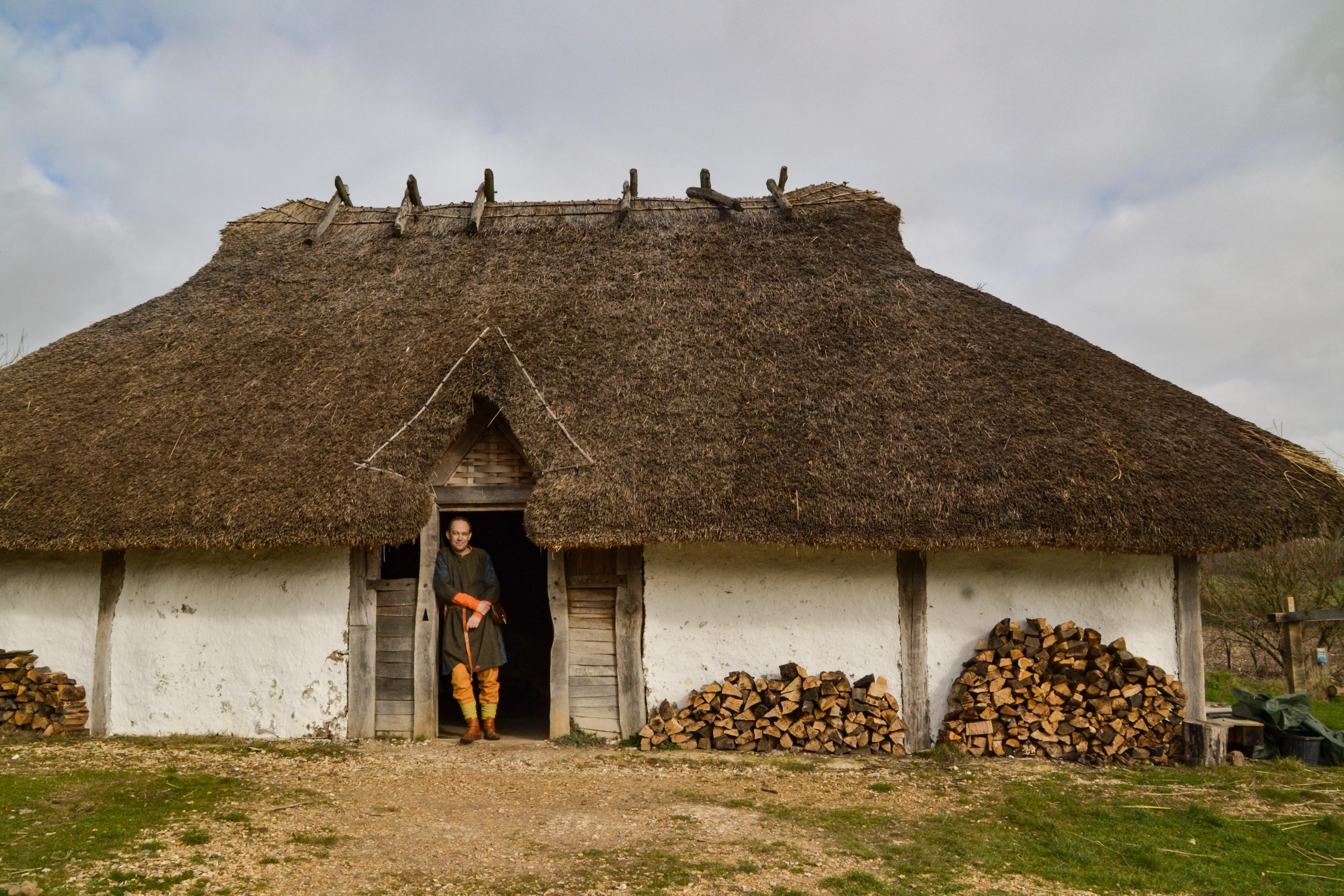
A re-enactor stands at the entrance to the Chalton A2 Saxon House reconstruction

There are two houses based on excavations from nearby Chalton Saxon Village. Chalton A2 was constructed in 2014 and the house is primarily made of English oak, sweet chestnut and hazel, all sourced from local coppiced woodlands. The roof is panelled wattle hurdles into which the wheat straw thatch was laid using hazel spars to hold it in place. The timber beams were hand hewn and the posts earth fastened into the ground. No nails or screws were used apart from in the Har-hung doors, and the beams are fixed using dovetail joints secured with trunnels.

Chalton A1 was completed in 2022, with alternate walls featuring hit-and-miss boarding and a gable end roof. There is also a small Saxon tree-wrights’ workshop built using Saxon timber jointing techniques which demonstrates a shingle roofing technique.

=== Other former buildings ===
The Stone Age area featured two structures based on excavations from Durrington Walls near Stonehenge; Durrington 851 and its ancillary building. They were both wattle and daub constructions thatched with wheat straw. Durrington 851 featured simple Neolithic furnishings matching the impressions of furniture found during the archaeological excavations at Durrington.

In the Iron Age section, built in 2009, roundhouse M59 was demolished after it became unstable.

== Experimental archaeology ==
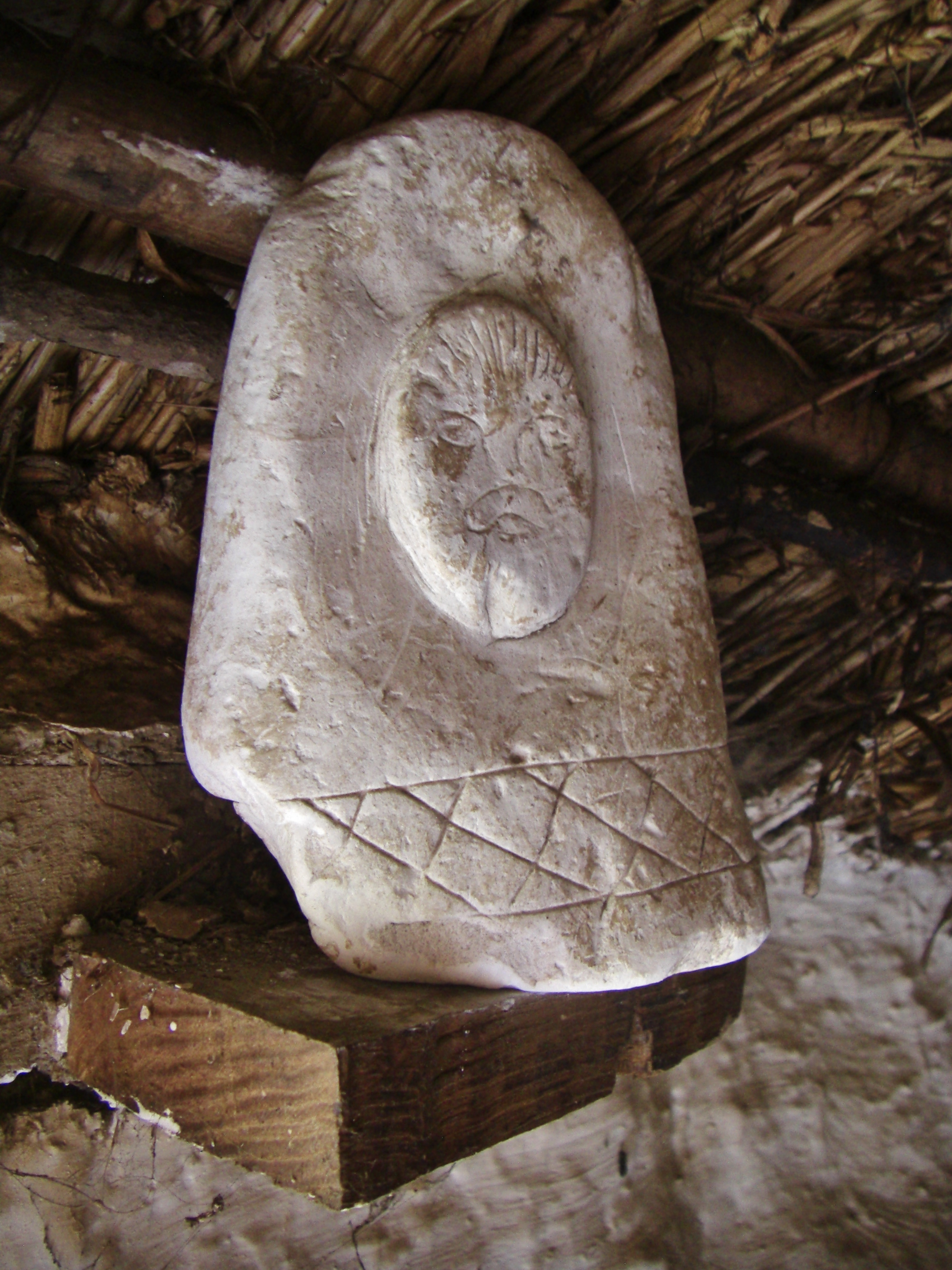
A statue based upon British Iron Age examples

Peter Reynolds of Butser Ancient Farm was instrumental in the creation and development of experimental archaeology as a discipline, and experimental work has been carried out at Butser Ancient Farm since the site’s inception in 1972. Until his death in 2001, the research work of the farm focused specifically on agriculture, domestic and agrarian life.

In more recent years, the study of buildings has become a key component of the farm’s research. Each building on display to the public today represents the conclusion of an experiment, conducted in response to theoretical hypotheses about archaeological features found in excavation, about construction methods and techniques, or a combination of these.

Other considerations in experimental work on buildings can include variables such as the shape and pitch of roofing, thatching materials and techniques and the use of construction materials including wattle and daub, planking, turf and clunch.

While the first buildings to be experimentally constructed at the farm were based on evidence from the Late Iron Age, the research remit of the farm has expanded to include structures from the Mesolithic, Neolithic, Bronze Age (currently under construction), the Iron Age, the Roman and early medieval periods.

== Film and television ==
The 1986 Doctor Who serial "The Mysterious Planet" was filmed at the farm. An episode of the 2005 BBC Television documentary series What the Ancients Did for Us examining the ideas and inventions of the Ancient Britons was filmed here.

Butser has also been featured in many other archaeological and historical documentaries including Mystic Britain, Digging for Britain and Britain’s Pompeii - A Village Lost in Time with Alice Roberts.

The Farm has also been used as a location in several feature films and television series including Horrible Histories: The Movie - Rotten Romans, Britannia, Arthur and Merlin, The Four Warriors and Gladiatress.

In 2021 Butser Ancient Farm launched a platform of documentaries about their experimental archaeology projects called Butser Plus.

== See also ==
- Castell Henllys, Wales
- Irish National Heritage Park, Ireland
- Weald and Downland Living Museum, West Sussex
