= Merseyside East (European Parliament constituency) =

Former European Parliament constituency

- European Parliament constituency
- Boundary within North West England (1984-1994)
- Member state: United Kingdom
- Created: 1984
- Dissolved: 1994
- MEPs: 1

Prior to its uniform adoption of proportional representation in 1999, the United Kingdom used first-past-the-post for the European elections in England, Scotland and Wales. The European Parliament constituencies used under that system were smaller than the later regional constituencies and only had one Member of the European Parliament each.

The constituency of Merseyside East was one of them. It was renamed Merseyside East and Wigan at the 1994 European election, though its boundaries remained unchanged until the constituency disappeared in 1999.

It consisted of the Westminster Parliament constituencies (on their 1983 boundaries) of Knowsley North, Knowsley South, Leigh, Liverpool Garston, Makerfield, St Helens North, St Helens South, and Wigan.

== MEPs ==
Elected	Member	Party
1984	Les Huckfield	Labour
1989	Terry Wynn	Labour
1994	Constituency abolished	

== Election results ==
European Parliament election, 1984: Merseyside East
Party	Candidate	Votes	%	±%
Labour	Les Huckfield	87,086	61.2	
Conservative	Thomas Galbraith	38,047	26.7	
SDP	Terence Bishop	17,259	12.1	
Majority		49,039	34.5	
Turnout		142,392	26.5	
Labour win (new seat)				

European Parliament election, 1989: Merseyside East
Party	Candidate	Votes	%	±%
Labour	Terry Wynn	107,288	65.7	+4.5
Conservative	Eric N. Farthing	30,421	18.6	−8.1
Green	Ray L. Georgeson	20,018	12.3	New
SLD	R. M. (Mark) Clayton	5,658	3.5	−8.6
Majority		76,867	47.1	+12.6
Turnout		163,385	31.4	+4.9
Labour hold		Swing		
