= Micheldever Wood =

Woodland in Hampshire, England

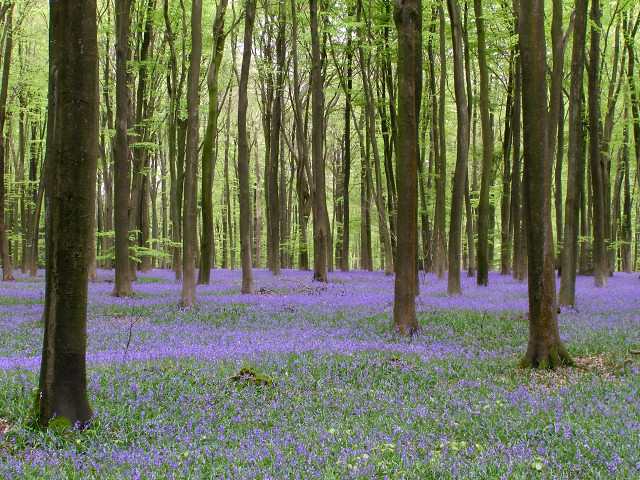
- Bluebells in Micheldever Wood

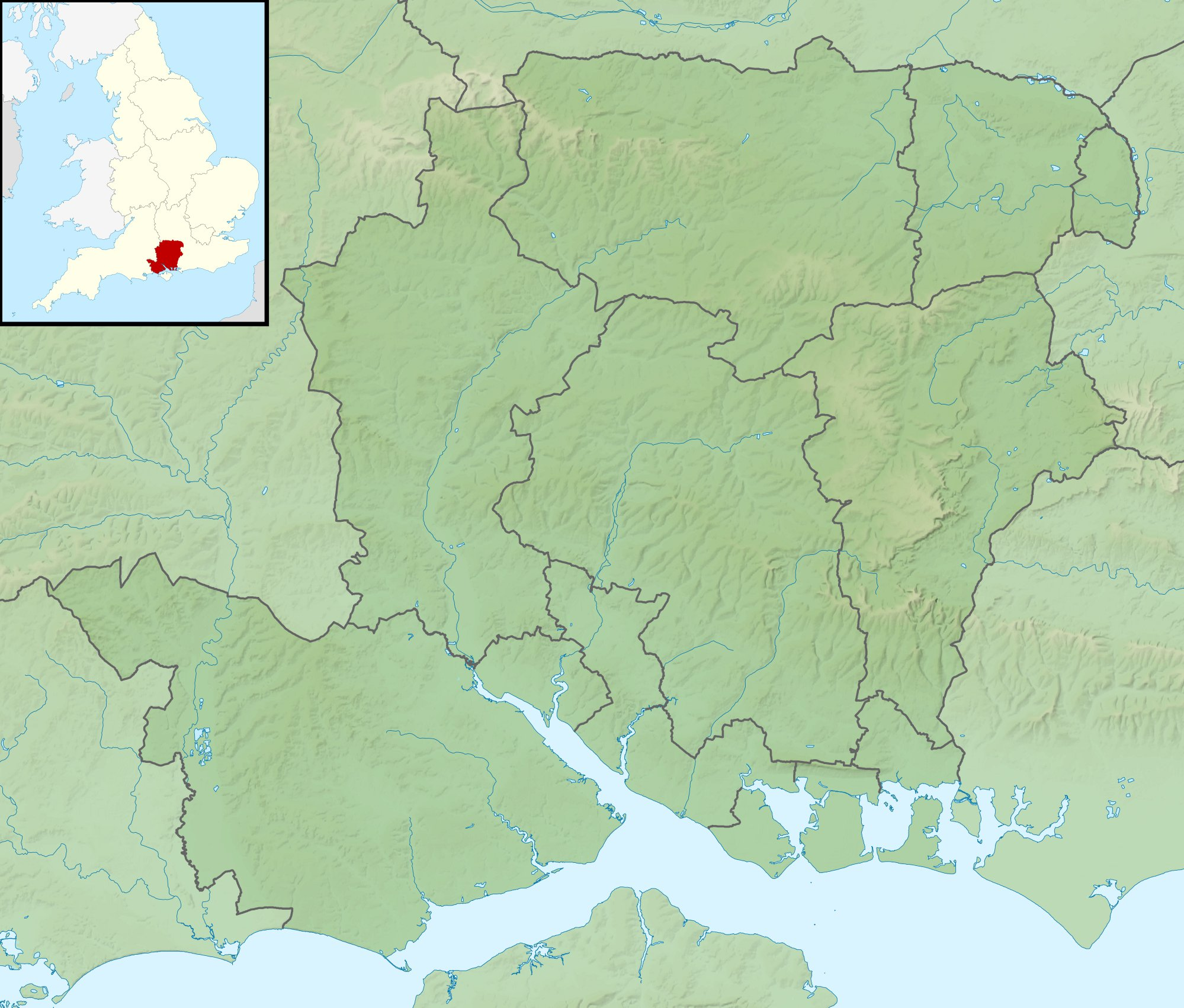
- Location within Hampshire
- Location: near Micheldever
- OS grid: SU 5337
- Coordinates: 51°8′2″N 1°14′36″W
- Area: 251.4 hectares (621 acres)
- Website: www.forestryengland.uk/micheldever-wood

Micheldever Wood is a wood near the village of Micheldever, in Hampshire, England, about 5 miles (8 km) north-east of Winchester. It is managed by Forestry England. There are prehistoric remains from the Bronze Age and other periods in the wood, including a Roman villa.

== Description ==
Its size is 251.4 hectares (621 acres); the M3 motorway runs through the western side. The wood consists mostly of beech trees, interspersed with some conifers. There is a car park; there are picnic places and two walking trails. There is a range of wildlife species, and muntjac deer can be found. Notable displays of bluebells can be seen in the spring.

=== History ===
The area was part of the Royal Forest of Pamber in the medieval period. Part of the present Micheldever Wood was later held by Hyde Abbey. The abbey was dissolved in the 16th century, and Micheldever Wood was purchased by Thomas Wriothesley; it later descended by marriage to the Dukes of Bedford, and was acquired in 1801 by Francis Baring, 1st Baronet. The wood was described in the 1820s by William Cobbett in Rural Rides as "one of the finest oak woods in England". It has been in the care of Forestry England since 1919.

=== Archaeological features ===
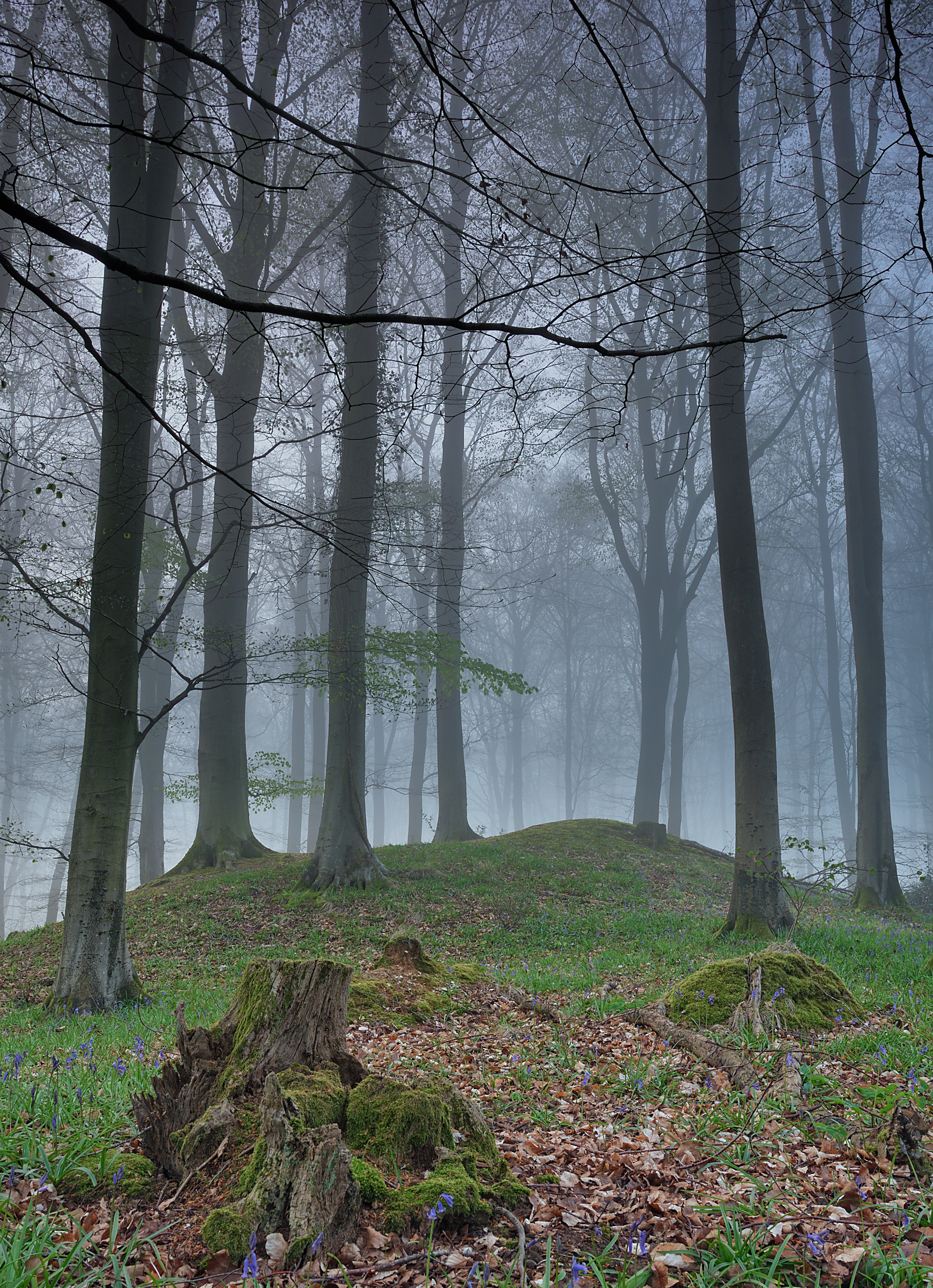
Bowl barrow in Micheldever Wood

Archaeological features survive from the Bronze Age to the Romano-British period, preserved for many centuries by the woodland. The remains are a scheduled monument. Information boards are provided for some of the features.

There is a Bronze Age cross dyke in the south-east of the wood, extending into Itchen Wood to the south; it is thought to mark a territorial boundary. It is a bank 3 metres (9.8 ft) wide, with a ditch either side; the part of the dyke in Micheldever Wood is about 90 metres (300 ft) long.

There is a linear earthwork running west–east across the wood. Nearby is a bowl barrow, 25 metres (82 ft) in diameter and 2 metres (6 ft 7 in) high, with a hollow left by antiquarian excavation; and a bell barrow, 23 metres (75 ft) in diameter and 1.8 metres (5 ft 11 in) high.

There are two banjo enclosures; these are regarded as dwelling places or stock enclosures of the middle Iron Age. These are of area 0.2 hectares (0.49 acres) and 0.3 hectares (0.74 acres), with entrance ways to the east in both cases.

There is much evidence of a Romano-British settlement. In the 1840s a hoard of more than 1400 Roman coins of the late fourth century were found; other artifacts and foundations of walls were also found. A field survey in 1992 recorded the remains of an L-shaped villa and associated buildings. Around these are traces of garden terraces and trackways, and there are two trackways linking the settlement to the Roman road between Winchester and Silchester.
