= King's Badge =

British Empire military service award

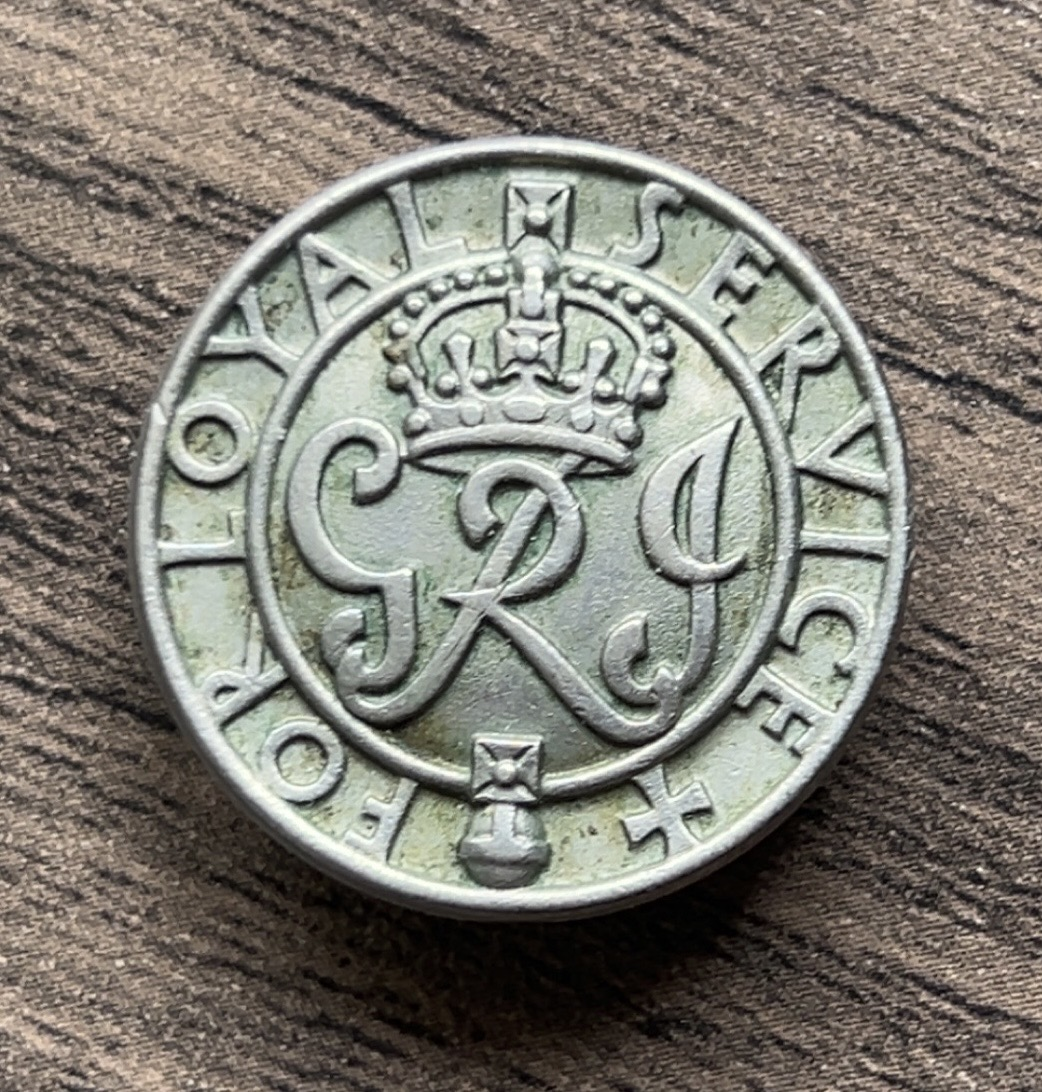
- Front of badge
- Type: Civilian lapel badge
- Awarded for: Honourable discharge due to wounds received during active service
- Description: Silver-coloured lapel badge
- Presented by: United Kingdom, Australia, and New Zealand
- Eligibility: Armed Forces, Merchant Navy, and civilian services engaged in war work
- Campaign: Second World War
- Status: Obsolete
- Established: 1939

The King's Badge is a large silver-coloured lapel badge authorised by the United Kingdom Ministry of Pensions in the early part of the Second World War and initially issued to servicemen who, as a result of their injuries, had been discharged from active service. It was to be worn only on civilian clothing and by the end of 1941 over 8,000 had been awarded.

Its basic purpose was to show that the wearer was a veteran. As well as members of the armed services, merchant navy and fishing fleets qualifying, by late 1944, it was also awarded to the coastguards, police, members of the Civil Defence Services, and the Home Guard.

Like the better known Silver War Badge of World War I, the King's Badge included the initials GRI for Georgius Rex Imperator, in this case referring to King-Emperor George VI. The earlier badge was in the name of his father, George V. The wording around the initials was also changed from For King and Empire Services Rendered to For Loyal Service. While it did come with a certificate, the King's Badge was not serially numbered.

== Variations ==
Three versions of the badge were produced - two larger versions (approximately 1” (about 26mm) in diameter) with either a half-moon buttonhole fitting for men, or a pin and latch fitting for women: a smaller buttonhole version (approximately ¾” (19mm) in diameter) was also manufactured (a variation of this has the outside of the badge enamelled in blue). All versions were made in die-stamped metal but without any maker’s marks.
