= George William Tallents =

British politician and barrister (1856–1924)

6th & 16th Mayor of Westminster
- In office 1905–1906
- Preceded by: Herbert Eaton, 3rd Baron Cheylesmore
- Succeeded by: John William Dennis
- In office 1918–1919
- Preceded by: George Earle Welby
- Succeeded by: Edward St Leger, 6th Viscount Doneraile

Personal details
- Born: 26 September 1856 Newark-on-Trent, United Kingdom
- Died: 17 December 1924 (aged 68) Pimlico, City of Westminster
- Spouse: Mildred Sophia Cubitt (m. 1883)
- Children: 3
- Education: University of Oxford

George William Tallents (26 September 1856 – 17 December 1924) was a British politician and barrister, who served as the Mayor of Westminster twice, in 1905-06 and 1918–19.

== Family ==
Tallents was the fourth son of Nottinghamshire solicitor Geoffrey Tallents and Mary Ann Frances Brande. He attended the Harrow School as well as the University of Oxford. In 1882 he was called to the bar at Lincoln's Inn, and in 1893 he became a Commissioner for the Westminster Public Baths.

He married Mildred Sophia Cubitt (25 Jan 1863 - 9 Mar 1930) on 4 October 1883 in the St. Barnabas church in Ranmore Common. They had three children together:

- Philip Cubitt Tallents (13 April 1886 – 4 November 1962), attended Magdalen College, Oxford and became an Indian Civil Servant and Assistant Magistrate and Collector in Bengal.
- Una Mildred Tallents (1890, Minster – 24 July 1970, Kensington)
- Thomas Francis Tallents (29 March 1896, London – 17 November 1947, Regent's Park), director in numerous Shipping companies.

Tallents captured on video at Trafalgar Square in 1919 during the National War savings Committee's Camoaign for the Victoey loan (2:38–2:48)
