= List of mayors of Westminster =

This is a list of mayors and the later lord mayors of the City of Westminster.

The official car of the Lord Mayor of Westminster bearing the registration number WE1.

After having elected a mayor since its creation as a Metropolitan Borough in 1900, the City of Westminster was awarded the dignity of a Lord Mayoralty by letters patent dated 11 March 1966.

The Lord Mayor of Westminster is ex-officio the deputy High Steward of Westminster Abbey. By tradition, the Lord Mayor of Westminster visits Oslo every year in the late autumn to take part in the felling of the Trafalgar Square Christmas tree.

== Mayors ==
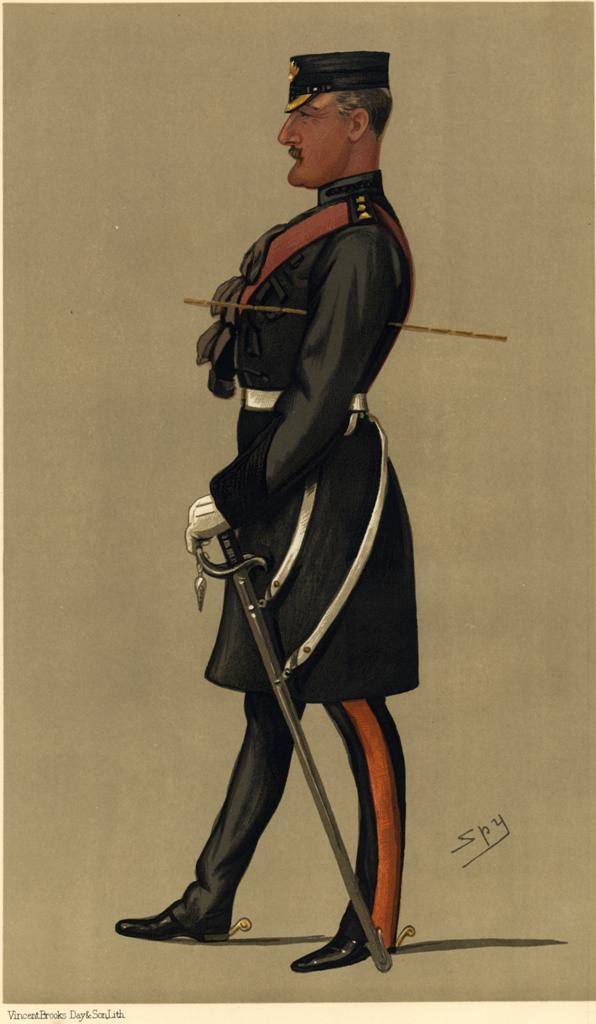
Major-General Lord Cheylemore. Mayor of Westminster 1904–1905. As depicted by "Spy" (Leslie Ward) in Vanity Fair, October 1891

Year	Name	Notes
1900	Henry Fitzalan-Howard, 15th Duke of Norfolk	1st Mayor of Westminster
1901	Colonel Clifford Probyn	
1902	Captain Herbert Merton Jessel	MP for St Pancras South 1896–1906, 1910–1918
1903	Walter Emden	Architect
1904	Major-General Lord Cheylesmore	Army officer
1905	George William Tallents	
1907	John William Dennis	MP for Birmingham, Deritend 1918–1922
1908	Robert Woolley Walden	
1909	Rev. Frederick Harcourt Hillersdon	
1910	Edward Lygon Somers Cocks	
1911	John Maria Gatti	Theatre manager, restaurateur and businessman
1912	Harold Lyon Thomson	
1913	Reginald White Granville-Smith	
1914	George Booth Heming	
1915–1918	George Earle Welby	3 terms
1918	George William Tallents	2nd term
1919	Edward St Leger, 6th Viscount Doneraile	
1920	Samuel Gluckstein	
1921	George Washington Lawrence	
1922	Frank Gibbs Rye	
1923	William Edgar Horne	
1924	Silvio Paul Bernini Bucknall	
1925	George Henry Heilbuth	
1926	Silvio Paul Bernini Bucknall	2nd term
1927	Jacques Abady	Lawyer
1928	Major Vivian Barry Rogers	
1929–1930	Captain Julien Frederick Charles Bennett	2 terms
1931–1932	Rev. Edward St George Schomberg	2 terms
1933–1934	Frederick George Rudler	2 terms
1935	James Cornelius Dalton	
1936	Arthur Jared Palmer Howard	MP for Westminster St George's 1945–1950
1937	Harry Sheil Elster Vanderpant	
1938	George Frederick Jerdain	
1939	Major Richard Rigg	MP for Appleby division, 1900–1905
1940	Leonard Eaton Smith	Killed in an air raid in May 1941. Post left vacant for rest of term.
1941	George Frederick Jerdain	2nd term
1942	W. Stanley Edgson	
1943	Hubert Victor Day	
1944	Maurice G. Giles	
1945	Edward Herbert Keeling	MP for Twickenham, 1935–1954
1946	Greville Reginald Charles Howard	MP for St Ives, 1950–1966
1947–1948	Hal Gutteridge	2 terms
1949	Colonel J. Allan Mulholland	
1950	Wilfred Eric Rice	
1951	Albert Sciver	
1952	Lieutenant-Colonel Henry Norman Edwards	
1953	Charles Pearce Russell	
1954	John Gordon Elsworthy	
1955–1956	Patrick Stirling	2 terms
1957	Sir Charles Norton	
1958	David Neville Cobbold	Lawyer
1959	Group Captain Gordon Pirie	
1960	Robert L. Everest	
1961	Jack Lodewyk Charles Dribbell	
1962	Paul Antony Negretti	
1963	Leslie Farmiloe	
1964	Brian Fitzgerald-Moore	

== Lord Mayors ==
Year	Name	Notes
1965	Sir Charles Norton	2nd term. First Lord Mayor.
1966	Anthony L. Burton	
1966	Arthur C. Barrett	
1967	Christopher Anthony Prendergast	
1968	Leonard Pearl	
1970	Brian Fitzgerald-Moore	2nd term
1971	John Wells	
1972	John E. Guest	
1973	David Neville Cobbold	2nd term
1974	Group Captain Gordon Pirie	2nd term
1975	Roger M. Dawe	
1976	Jack Gillett	
1977	Sir Hugh Cubitt	
1978	Wing Commander William Henry Kearney	
1979	Reginald Forrester	
1980	Donald du Parc Braham	
1981	G. I. Harley	
1982	Thomas Whipham	
1983	Phoebette Sitwell	First female Lord Mayor
1984	John Bull	
1985	Roger Bramble	
1986	Mrs Terence Mallinson	
1987	Kevin Gardner	
1988	Elizabeth Flach	
1989	Simon Mabey	
1990	Dr David Avery	
1991	Dame Shirley Porter	
1992	Dr Cyril Nemeth	
1993	Jenny Bianco	
1994	Angela Hooper	
1995	Alan Bradley	
1996	Robert Davis	
1997	Ronald Raymond-Cox	
1998	David Harvey	
1999	Alex Segal	
2000	Michael Brahams	
2001	Harvey Marshall	
2002	Frances Blois	
2003	Jan Prendergast	
2004	Catherine Longworth	
2005	Tim Joiner	
2006	Alexander Nicoll	
2007	Carolyn Keen	
2008	Louise Hyams	
2009	Duncan Sandys	
2010	Judith Warner	
2011	Susie Burbridge	
2012	Angela Harvey	
2013	Sarah Richardson	
2014	Audrey Lewis	
2015	Lady Christabel Flight	
2016	Steve Summers	
2017	Ian Adams	
2018	Lindsey Hall	
2019	Ruth Bush	First Lord Mayor elected from the minority party
2020	Jonathan Glanz	
2021	Andrew Smith	
2022	Hamza Taouzzale	Youngest and first Muslim Lord Mayor. Aged 22 when assumed office, he is the youngest Lord Mayor in history.
2023	Patricia McAllister	
2024	Robert Rigby	Awarded a Papal Knighthood for his service in public life and to the Church.
2025	Paul Dimoldenberg	
2026	Karen Scarborough	
