= Paul Nischal =

British politician

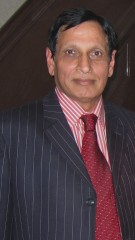
- Born: British India
- Political party: Conservative Party (UK)

Paul Nischal is British politician. He joined the Conservative Party in 1965 and subsequently became the first Indian Member of British Parliament to run for the British Conservative Party.

== Career ==
Nischal joined the Conservative Party in 1965. His membership was especially valued for his strong influence in the asian business community of Birmingham. Following the 2nd consecutive UK general election defeat by the Conservative party as the party moved more towards the right of the political spectrum, Paul Nischal joined the Labour Party in 2000.

During the 1983 and 1987 General Elections, became the first Indian Member of British Parliament to run for the British Conservative Party, contesting the Birmingham Small Heath Constituency.

Nischal acted as a political aide to Rajiv Gandhi, the 7th Prime Minister of India during the 1991 campaign. He continues working for the City of Birmingham UK in Education as well as performing a role as a Foundation Governor for the Grammar School King Edward VI Five Ways. He has also been heavily active over for the last 35 years for many Indian Charities supporting the educational needs of underprivileged children. He was also member of The Birmingham City Council Education Committee from 1981 to 1983.

Nischal founded the N.R.I. Club International and International Overseas Indian Club, where he serves as President and Chief Executive. He is also National Chairman of Asian Peoples Welfare Society (UK) to care for the elderly and disabled people.

== Birmingham, Small Heath ==
General Election 1983: Birmingham, Small Heath
Party	Candidate	Votes	%	±%
Labour	Denis Howell	22,874	63.8	n/a
Conservative	Paul Nischal	7,262	20.2	n/a
Liberal	Andrew Bostock	5,722	16.0	n/a

== Birmingham, Small Heath ==
General Election 1987: Birmingham, Small Heath
Party	Candidate	Votes	%	±%
Labour	Denis Howell	22,787	66.3	n/a
Conservative	Paul Nischal	7,266	21.1	+4
Liberal	John Hemming	3,600	10.5	n/a

== See also ==
- Nischal
- Jalandhar
- Non-resident Indian and Person of Indian Origin
- Rajiv Gandhi
- King Edward VI Five Ways
- Birmingham Small Heath (UK Parliament constituency)
