= Small Heath (disambiguation) =

Small Heath is an area in Birmingham, England. It may also refer to:

== Biological species ==
- Small heath (butterfly) (Coenonympha pamphilus)

== Organizations ==
- Birmingham Small Heath (UK Parliament constituency), a Parliament constituency centred on the Small Heath area of Birmingham
- Small Heath or Small Heath Alliance, former names of the Birmingham City F.C.
