= Roger Godsiff =

British Independent politician (born 1946)

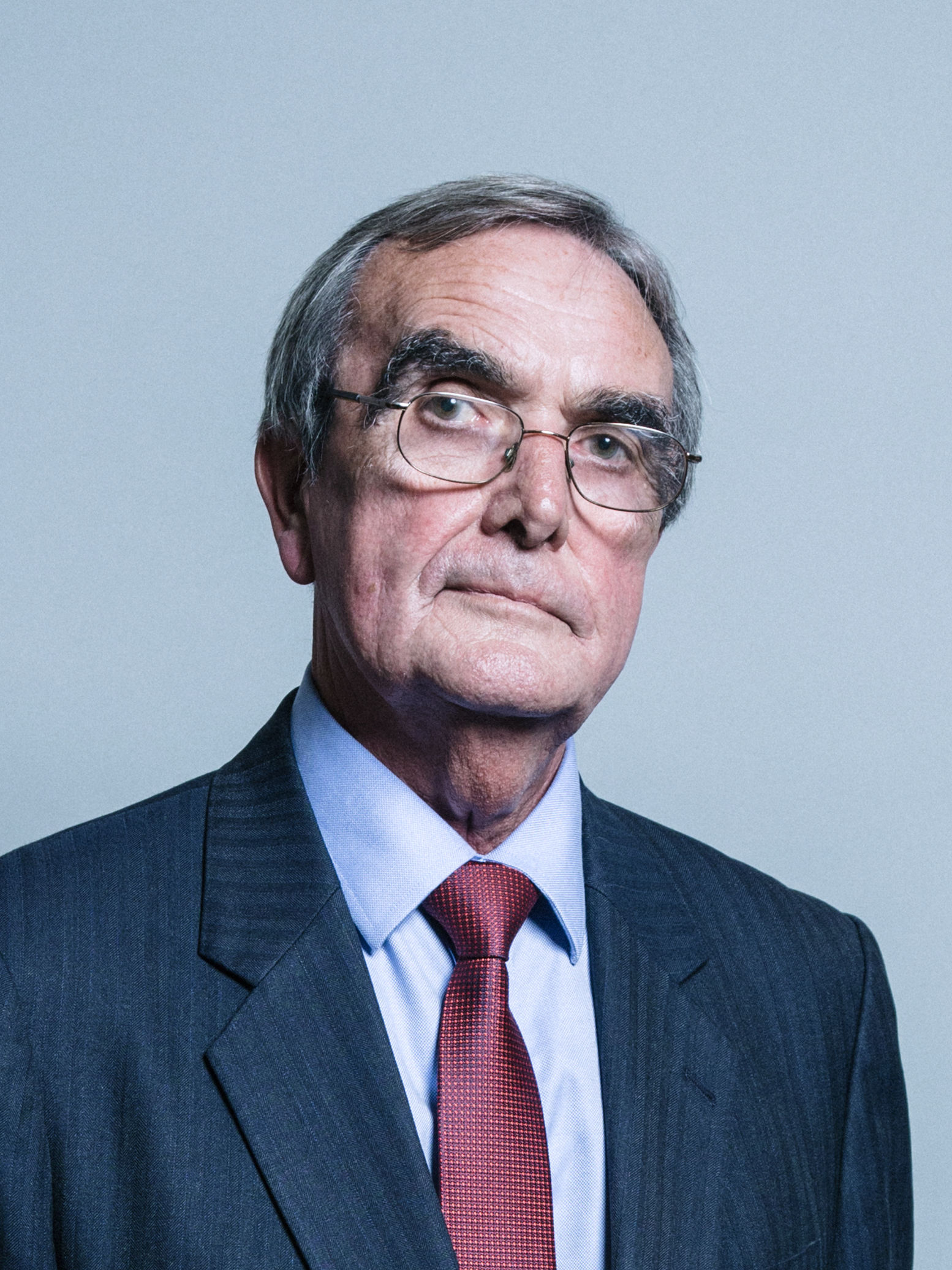
- Official portrait, 2017

Member of Parliament for Birmingham Hall Green
- In office 6 May 2010 – 6 November 2019
- Preceded by: Steve McCabe
- Succeeded by: Tahir Ali

Member of Parliament for Birmingham Sparkbrook and Small Heath Birmingham Small Heath (1992–1997)
- In office 9 April 1992 – 12 April 2010
- Preceded by: Denis Howell
- Succeeded by: Constituency abolished

Personal details
- Born: 28 June 1946 (age 80) Lewisham, London, England
- Party: Independent (2019-present); Labour (1966–2019)
- Spouse: Julia Morris (m. 1977)

Roger Duncan Godsiff (born 28 June 1946) is a British former politician who served as the Labour Member of Parliament (MP) from 1992 to 2019, for the seats of Birmingham Small Heath, Birmingham Sparkbrook and Small Heath, and Birmingham Hall Green.

In October 2019, Hall Green Constituency Labour Party members overwhelmingly voted to open selections for their Parliamentary Candidate, with votes of 86 to 6 in Moseley and Kings Heath Branch and 37 to 11 in Hall Green Branch to have the option to choose a candidate other than Roger Godsiff. This followed several years of controversy about the MP's stances, including voting with the Conservative Party on key Brexit votes, and outspokenly opposing LGBT+ Inclusive Education in Birmingham schools. Godsiff subsequently declared his intention to stand as an independent candidate. He lost the seat to the Labour Party candidate, Tahir Ali, coming third behind Labour and the Conservatives.

== Early life ==
Roger Godsiff was born in London and educated at Catford Comprehensive School.

He was a bank clerk for five years from 1965, joining the Labour Party in 1966.

He was a political officer from 1970 with the trade union APEX and then from 1990 with its successor the GMB until his election to Parliament in 1992. During his time as a trade union official, he was a member of the St Ermin's group, a secret caucus of moderate trade unionists who moved the Labour Party back towards the political centre by organising slates for elections to the party's National Executive Committee.

== Political career ==
Elected as a councillor in the London Borough of Lewisham in 1971, he became the Mayor of Lewisham for 1977–78, before quitting the council at the 1990 London Borough elections. He unsuccessfully contested Birmingham Yardley at the 1983 general election, where he finished in second place behind the sitting Conservative MP David Gilroy Bevan. He was elected to the House of Commons for Birmingham Small Heath at the 1992 general election following the retirement of Denis Howell. Godsiff held Small Heath with a majority of 13,989 votes and remained an MP from that point. His constituency was abolished in 1997 and, aided by the retirement of Birmingham Sparkbrook MP Roy Hattersley, Godsiff was elected for the newly combined constituency of Birmingham Sparkbrook and Small Heath at the 1997 general election.

The Sparkbrook and Small Heath seat was abolished at the 2010 election, with its constituent parts moving into neighbouring seats. Godsiff was selected for the redrawn Birmingham Hall Green seat in 2008, which includes some of his existing constituency and wards which were formerly in the two Birmingham constituencies of Hall Green and Selly Oak. He was re-elected at the May 2010 general election with a majority of 3,799.

In Parliament he was a special adviser to the former Minister of Sport Richard Caborn on cricket and was the chairman of the All Party Japan Group. In October 2006, Godsiff was one of 12 Labour MPs to back Plaid Cymru and the Scottish National Party's call for an inquiry into the Iraq War. He also rebelled against the government in November 2005 on legislation permitting the detention of terrorist suspects for 90 days without trial.

In January 2005, Godsiff called for economic migration to the UK to be "stopped". He said that economic migration was unnecessary and it posed a danger to race relations within the UK.

In the 2009 parliamentary expenses scandal, Godsiff was reported as using office expenses for extensive roofing work, rewiring, replacement guttering and even clock repair at a property he owns. He incurred the second highest expenses of all 647 MPs' for 2008/2009 with claims for £189,338.

Andy McSmith's book Faces of Labour (1996), contends that Godsiff obtained selection for his seat in 1992 by dubious means which, although accepted by the Labour Party, were too late to act upon. In 2005, Tribune made similar allegations about his successful bid to stave off deselection, which was only thwarted by the local votes of his former employer, the GMB Union. Godsiff had angered many in his local party by his calls for curbs on immigration.

During the 2010 general election campaign, Godsiff issued leaflets suggesting the Liberal Democrats were in favour of "convicted murderers, rapists, and paedophiles to be given the vote" (according to the leaflet), which the Lib Dems denied was their policy. The leaflets contained images of various high-profile criminals, including child sex offender and nursery worker Vanessa George and serial killer Steven Wright. Labour's general secretary Ray Collins said the leaflet was not approved at a national level and the local campaign was later scrapped.

In 2011, The Guardian declared that, based on his participation in votes, Godsiff was "Britain's laziest MP", being absent from 88% of votes at the start of that year. He had attended less than 50% of parliamentary debates during his whole time in office and refused to take any part in hustings meetings. He responded to the Birmingham Mail about his participation, saying, "when you are in opposition and the government has a substantial majority, you know perfectly well that you aren't going to be able to have an effect on every vote".

In May 2013, Godsiff voted against the Marriage (Same Sex Couples) Act 2013 final reading, opposing the legalisation of same-sex marriage within England and Wales. Godsiff advised he opposed the "redefining the current definition of marriage."

Godsiff was one of seven signatories in 2014 of an open letter to Ed Miliband calling upon him to commit to restricting the ability of workers from low income EU countries to move to the UK.

Notably, in the 2016 United Kingdom European Union membership referendum, Godsiff supported the Leave campaign, although his constituency (Birmingham Hall Green) voted by 66.4% to remain in the European Union. Unusually for a pro-Brexit MP, he abstained from the vote to invoke Article 50, which would commence the UK's process of withdrawal from the EU, on the grounds that he was respecting his constituents' pro-Remain vote.

Godsiff supported Owen Smith in the latter's failed attempt to replace Jeremy Corbyn in the 2016 Labour leadership election.

During the 2017 election campaign, his local campaign leaflet went viral in the UK due to its slogan "unwanted, unnecessary, opportunistic", which was supposed to be about the snap election called by Theresa May, but appeared, due to the format, to be referring to Godsiff himself. At the election he gained 42,143 votes (77.6%), giving him a majority of 33,944 (62.5%), which was the twelfth largest majority of any UK MP by percentage of constituency vote.

In May 2019, in the wake of protests in Birmingham over LGBT-inclusive education in primary schools, Godsiff sided with the protestors: "I have concerns about the age appropriateness of children of four and five being introduced to these ideas", he said, later admitting that he had not read the books. Anderton Park Primary School in Sparkhill, which has been at the centre of the row, is in Godsiff's former constituency. He defended his voting record on equality legislation, stating, "I am supportive of the LGBT community. I have consistently voted for all laws pertaining to equality and to defend the rights of everyone to live the lifestyle they choose."

In October 2019, Labour Party members in all four branches of his Hall Green constituency opted to trigger a re-selection process to choose the Labour candidate at the next general election. As a sitting Member of Parliament, Godsiff was automatically entitled to be shortlisted as a potential candidate. Godsiff had indicated that he intended to stand for re-selection. However, the process was paused due to the election being called that month, resulting in the decision being made by the NEC to not endorse Godsiff and select a new candidate with a local panel.

He stood as an independent at the 2019 general election and came third. He was succeeded in the seat by Tahir Ali.

== Personal life ==
Godsiff has been married to Julia Brenda Morris since 1977 and they have a son and a daughter.

He is a lifelong supporter of Charlton Athletic F.C. He was previously the chairman of the Charlton Athletic Community Trust, which oversees the club's community work. He resigned from this position on 26 June 2019 following the controversy surrounding his support for the anti-LGBT protesters in Birmingham.

Parliament of the United Kingdom
Preceded by Denis Howell	Member of Parliament for Birmingham Small Heath; 1992–1997	Constituency abolished
New constituency	Member of Parliament for Birmingham Sparkbrook and Small Heath; 1997–2010	Constituency abolished
Preceded by Steve McCabe	Member of Parliament for Birmingham Hall Green; 2010–2019	Succeeded by Tahir Ali
