= Birmingham Deritend =

Parliamentary constituency in the United Kingdom, 1918–1950

- Former borough constituency for the House of Commons

1918–1950
- Seats: One
- Created from: Birmingham South and Birmingham Bordesley
- Replaced by: Birmingham Sparkbrook (Majority) and Birmingham Small Heath (Part)

Birmingham Deritend was a constituency of the House of Commons of the Parliament of the United Kingdom from 1918 to 1950. It elected one Member of Parliament (MP) by the first-past-the-post system of election.

== Boundaries ==
Prior to 1918 the parliamentary borough of Birmingham (within its boundaries in 1885) was split into seven single-member divisions. Under the Representation of the People Act 1918 the city contained twelve divisions, one of which was Birmingham Deritend.

This division of Birmingham was composed of the City Council Wards of St Bartholomew's, St. Martin's and Deritend as they existed in 1918. The St. Martin's and Deritend wards had previously been part of the Birmingham South constituency, and the St. Bartholomew's ward had previously been part of the Birmingham Bordesley constituency.

In the redistribution under the Representation of the People Act 1948 which took effect in 1950, the then Deritend and St. Martin's wards became part of Birmingham Sparkbrook, and the St. Bartholomew's ward became part of Birmingham Small Heath.

== Members of Parliament ==
Election	Member	Party	Notes
1918	John William Dennis	Conservative	
1922	Smedley Crooke	Conservative	
1929	Fred Longden	Labour Co-operative	
1931	Sir Smedley Crooke	Conservative	
1945	Fred Longden	Labour Co-operative	Contested Birmingham Small Heath following redistribution
1950	Constituency abolished		

== Election results ==
General election 1945: Birmingham Deritend
Party	Candidate	Votes	%	±%
Labour Co-op	Fred Longden	9,749	65.3	+24.8
Conservative	Gordon Richards Matthews	5,172	34.7	−24.8
Majority		4,577	30.6	N/A
Turnout		14,941	63.0	+3.4
Registered electors		23,693		
Labour Co-op gain from Conservative		Swing	+18.6	

=== Election in the 1930s ===
General election 1935: Birmingham Deritend
Party	Candidate	Votes	%	±%
Conservative	Smedley Crooke	14,925	59.5	−6.5
Labour Co-op	Fred Longden	10,144	40.5	+6.5
Majority		4,781	19.0	−13.0
Turnout		25,069	59.6	−12.3
Registered electors		42,078		
Conservative hold		Swing		

General election 1931: Birmingham Deritend
Party	Candidate	Votes	%	±%
Conservative	Smedley Crooke	21,684	66.0	+23.5
Labour Co-op	Fred Longden	11,163	34.0	−16.7
Majority		10,521	32.0	N/A
Turnout		32,847	71.9	+1.3
Registered electors		45,671		
Conservative gain from Labour Co-op		Swing		

=== Election in the 1920s ===
General election 1929: Birmingham Deritend
Party	Candidate	Votes	%	±%
Labour Co-op	Fred Longden	16,932	50.7	+2.2
Unionist	Smedley Crooke	14,165	42.5	−9.0
Liberal	Beta Hornabrook	2,268	6.8	New
Majority		2,767	8.2	N/A
Turnout		33,365	70.6	+1.3
Registered electors		47,262		
Labour Co-op gain from Unionist		Swing	+5.6	

General election 1924: Birmingham Deritend
Party	Candidate	Votes	%	±%
Conservative	Smedley Crooke	13,552	51.5	−4.6
Labour Co-op	Fred Longden	12,760	48.5	+4.6
Majority		792	3.0	−9.2
Turnout		26,312	69.3	+12.5
Registered electors		37,980		
Conservative hold		Swing	−4.6	

General election 1923: Birmingham Deritend
Party	Candidate	Votes	%	±%
Unionist	Smedley Crooke	12,015	56.1	+7.2
Labour	Fred Longden	9,396	43.9	+15.1
Majority		2,619	12.2	−7.9
Turnout		21,411	56.8	−7.9
Registered electors		37,671		
Unionist hold		Swing	−4.0	

General election 1922: Birmingham Deritend
Party	Candidate	Votes	%	±%
Unionist	Smedley Crooke	11,700	48.9	−33.8
Labour	Fred Longden	6,892	28.8	New
Liberal	Herbert Willison	5,331	22.3	+5.0
Majority		4,808	20.1	−45.3
Turnout		23,923	64.7	
Registered electors		36,985		
Unionist hold		Swing		

=== Election in the 1910s ===
General election 1918: Birmingham Deritend
Party		Candidate	Votes	%
C	Unionist	John William Dennis	9,495	82.7
	Liberal	Arthur Brampton	1,990	17.3
Majority			7,505	65.4
Turnout			11,485	43.9
Registered electors			38,552	
	Unionist win (new seat)			
C indicates candidate endorsed by the coalition government.

== Sources ==
- Boundaries of Parliamentary Constituencies 1885-1972, compiled and edited by F.W.S. Craig (Parliamentary Reference Publications 1972)
