= Francis Eaton =

Francis Eaton may refer to:

- Francis Eaton (Mayflower passenger) (c. 1596–1633)
- Francis Eaton, 4th Baron Cheylesmore (1893–1974)
