= 1952 Birmingham Small Heath by-election =

UK Parliamentary by-election

The 1952 Birmingham Small Heath by-election was held on 27 November 1952. It was held due to the death of the incumbent Labour MP, Fred Longden. It was won by the Labour candidate William Wheeldon.

By-Election 27 November 1952: Birmingham Small Heath
Party	Candidate	Votes	%	±%
Labour Co-op	William Wheeldon	19,491	67.0	+3.6
Conservative	Edith Pitt	9,614	33.0	+2.1
Majority		9,877	34.0	+1.5
Turnout		29,105	46.6	−30.6
Labour Co-op hold		Swing	−2.9	
