= St Bartholomew (Birmingham ward) =

St Bartholomew was a ward of the County Borough of Birmingham. It was abolished in 1949.

== Ward description ==
The ward covered an area of Birmingham just south-east of the city centre.

== Ward history ==
The ward was in existence in 1911, when the boundaries of the city council were extended and the number of wards extended from 18 to 30 wards in all. At that stage three councillors were elected, and then in subsequent years there were single elections.

In 1949 the boundaries of Birmingham wards were reviewed, and as St Bartholomew had 12,015 electors at the 1949 election, with the average across the city being 23,241, it resulted in the abolition of the ward, which was split between Market Hall and St Martins & Deritend wards.

== Parliamentary representation ==
The ward has been part of Birmingham Bordesley from 1888 to 1918 and Birmingham Deritend from 1918 until the ward's abolition.

== Politics ==
Upon its creation in 1911 the seat was a Liberal stronghold and they retained it throughout the next decade. However, in the early 1920s all three parties became competitive at times, and each won the ward at various times. Labour however became the dominant party and after 1926 only lost it once which was in the disaster of 1931, when they failed to win any Birmingham wards.

== Election results ==
=== 1940s ===
1949 Electorate 12,015 Turnout 46.2%
| Party | Candidate | Votes | % | ±% |
|---|---|---|---|---|
| Labour | E Smith | 3,036 | 54.7% | |
| Conservative | J Evans | 2,511 | 45.3% | |
| Majority | | 525 | 9.4% | |
| Labour hold | | Swing | | |

1947 Electorate 11,591 Turnout 42.6%
| Party | Candidate | Votes | % | ±% |
|---|---|---|---|---|
| Labour | E Hall | 2,580 | 52.2% | |
| Conservative | P Arnold | 2,360 | 47.8% | |
| Majority | | 220 | 4.4% | |
| Labour hold | | Swing | | |

1946 Electorate 11,591 Turnout 31.4%
| Party | Candidate | Votes | % | ±% |
|---|---|---|---|---|
| Labour | F Coleman | 2,191 | 60.3% | |
| Conservative | P Arnold | 1,443 | 39.7% | |
| Majority | | 748 | 20.6% | |
| Labour hold | | Swing | | |

1945 Electorate 11,134 Turnout 32.6%
| Party | Candidate | Votes | % | ±% |
|---|---|---|---|---|
| Labour | William Wheeldon | 2,412 | 66.6% | |
| Conservative | J Evans | 1,212 | 33.4% | |
| Majority | | 1,200 | 33.2% | |
| Labour hold | | Swing | | |

=== 1930s ===
1939 Electorate 11,440 Turnout No Contest
| Party | Candidate | Votes | % | ±% |
|---|---|---|---|---|
| Labour | William Wheeldon | Unopposed | % | |
| Majority | | | % | |
| Labour hold | | Swing | | |

1938 Electorate 11,777 Turnout 39.3%
| Party | Candidate | Votes | % | ±% |
|---|---|---|---|---|
| Labour | A Longden | 2,457 | 53.2% | |
| Conservative | R Dare | 2,165 | 46.8% | |
| Majority | | 292 | 6.4% | |
| Labour hold | | Swing | | |

1937 Electorate 12,409 Turnout 32.1%
| Party | Candidate | Votes | % | ±% |
|---|---|---|---|---|
| Labour | G Thompson | 2,111 | 52.9% | |
| Conservative | J Morgan | 1,877 | 47.1% | |
| Majority | | 234 | 5.8% | |
| Labour hold | | Swing | | |

1936 Electorate 13,110 Turnout No Contest
| Party | Candidate | Votes | % | ±% |
|---|---|---|---|---|
| Labour | William Wheeldon | Unopposed | % | |
| Majority | | | % | |
| Labour hold | | Swing | | |

1935 Electorate 13,390 Turnout 29.9%
| Party | Candidate | Votes | % | ±% |
|---|---|---|---|---|
| Labour | A Longden | 2,274 | 56.9% | |
| Conservative | J White | 1,726 | 43.2% | |
| Majority | | 548 | 13.7% | |
| Labour hold | | Swing | | |

1934 Electorate 13,593 Turnout 24.2%
| Party | Candidate | Votes | % | ±% |
|---|---|---|---|---|
| Labour | G Thompson | 2,092 | 63.6% | |
| Conservative | C Elbourne | 1,198 | 36.4% | |
| Majority | | 894 | 27.2% | |
| Labour gain from Conservative | | Swing | | |

1933 Electorate 13,927 Turnout 29.2%
| Party | Candidate | Votes | % | ±% |
|---|---|---|---|---|
| Labour | William Wheeldon | 2,637 | 64.8% | |
| Conservative | J Brewin | 1,431 | 35.2% | |
| Majority | | 1,206 | 29.6% | |
| Labour hold | | Swing | | |

1932 Electorate 13,953 Turnout 35.5%
| Party | Candidate | Votes | % | ±% |
|---|---|---|---|---|
| Labour | A Longden | 3,569 | 72.1% | |
| Conservative | F Fawcett | 1,383 | 27.9% | |
| Majority | | 2,186 | 44.2% | |
| Labour hold | | Swing | | |

1931 Electorate 14,032 Turnout 33.79%
| Party | Candidate | Votes | % | ±% |
|---|---|---|---|---|
| Conservative | H Smith | 2,741 | 57.8% | |
| Labour | J Tonks | 2,001 | 42.2% | |
| Majority | | 740 | 15.6% | |
| Conservative gain from Labour | | Swing | | |

1930 Electorate 14,271 Turnout 29.5%
| Party | Candidate | Votes | % | ±% |
|---|---|---|---|---|
| Labour | William Wheeldon | 2,296 | 54.6% | |
| Conservative | W Walter | 1,909 | 45.4% | |
| Majority | | 387 | 9.2% | |
| Labour hold | | Swing | | |

=== 1920s ===
1929 Electorate 14,764 Turnout 22.2%
| Party | Candidate | Votes | % | ±% |
|---|---|---|---|---|
| Labour | A Longden | 2,318 | 70.8% | |
| Conservative | F Greenhill | 931 | 28.4% | |
| Communist | H Shepperson | 27 | 0.8% | |
| Majority | | 1,387 | 42.4% | |
| Labour hold | | Swing | | |

1928 Electorate 13,777 Turnout 31.5%
| Party | Candidate | Votes | % | ±% |
|---|---|---|---|---|
| Labour | J Tonks | 2,598 | 59.9% | |
| Conservative | H Sale | 1,740 | 40.1% | |
| Majority | | 858 | 19.8% | |
| Labour gain from Conservative | | Swing | | |

1927 Electorate 13,712 Turnout 30.6%
| Party | Candidate | Votes | % | ±% |
|---|---|---|---|---|
| Labour | William Wheeldon | 2,545 | 60.6% | |
| Liberal | J Stephens | 1,656 | 39.4% | |
| Majority | | 889 | 21.2% | |
| Labour gain from Liberal | | Swing | | |

1926 Electorate 13,762 Turnout 36.5%
| Party | Candidate | Votes | % | ±% |
|---|---|---|---|---|
| Labour | A Longden | 3,063 | 60.9% | |
| Conservative | J Danielsen | 1,966 | 39.1% | |
| Majority | | 1,097 | 21.8% | |
| Labour gain from Conservative | | Swing | | |

1925 Electorate 13,909 Turnout 4,017%
| Party | Candidate | Votes | % | ±% |
|---|---|---|---|---|
| Conservative | H Sale | 2,068 | 51.5% | |
| Labour | G Payne | 1,949 | 48.5% | |
| Majority | | 119 | 3% | |
| Conservative gain from Labour | | Swing | | |

1924 Electorate 13,824 Turnout 26.1%
| Party | Candidate | Votes | % | ±% |
|---|---|---|---|---|
| Liberal | J Stephens | 2,038 | 56.5% | |
| Labour | E Podesta | 1,567 | 43.5% | |
| Majority | | 471 | 13.0% | |
| Liberal hold | | Swing | | |

1923 Electorate 13,823 Turnout 31.9%
| Party | Candidate | Votes | % | ±% |
|---|---|---|---|---|
| Conservative | J Danielsen | 2,567 | 58.2% | |
| Labour | E Podesta | 1,846 | 41.8% | |
| Majority | | 721 | 16.4% | |
| Conservative hold | | Swing | | |

1922 Electorate 13,598 Turnout 28.5%
| Party | Candidate | Votes | % | ±% |
|---|---|---|---|---|
| Labour | G Payne | 2,404 | 62.0% | |
| Liberal | A Wright | 1,472 | 38.0% | |
| Majority | | 932 | 24.0% | |
| Labour gain from Liberal | | Swing | | |

1921 Electorate 13,356 Turnout 27.6%
| Party | Candidate | Votes | % | ±% |
|---|---|---|---|---|
| Liberal | J Stephens | 2,296 | 62.3% | |
| Conservative | F Willis | 1,390 | 37.7% | |
| Majority | | 906 | 24.6% | |
| Liberal hold | | Swing | | |

1920 Electorate 13,335 Turnout 28.9%
| Party | Candidate | Votes | % | ±% |
|---|---|---|---|---|
| Conservative | J Danielsen | 2,435 | 63.3% | |
| Labour | J Adams | 1,414 | 36.7% | |
| Majority | | 1,021 | 26.6% | |
| Conservative gain from Liberal | | Swing | | |

=== 1910s ===
1919 Electorate 13,317 Turnout 11.8%
| Party | Candidate | Votes | % | ±% |
|---|---|---|---|---|
| Liberal | A Wright | 1,029 | 65.5% | |
| Conservative | W Jackson | 542 | 34.5% | |
| Majority | | 487 | 31.0% | |
| Liberal hold | | Swing | | |

1914 Electorate 7,040 Turnout No contest
| Party | Candidate | Votes | % | ±% |
|---|---|---|---|---|
| Liberal | G Jackson | Unopposed | % | |
| Majority | | | % | |
| Liberal hold | | Swing | | |

1913 Electorate 6,867 Turnout No contest
| Party | Candidate | Votes | % | ±% |
|---|---|---|---|---|
| Liberal | J Stevens | Unopposed | % | |
| Majority | | | % | |
| Liberal hold | | Swing | | |

1912 Electorate 6,578 Turnout 29.1%
| Party | Candidate | Votes | % | ±% |
|---|---|---|---|---|
| Liberal | T Duggan | 1,302 | 68.1% | |
| Conservative | J Pentland | 609 | 31.9% | |
| Majority | | 693 | 36.2% | |
| Liberal hold | | Swing | | |

Wednesday 1 November 1911 Electorate 6,894 Turnout 37.3%
| Party | Candidate | Votes | % | ±% |
|---|---|---|---|---|
| Liberal | G Jackson | 1,571 | 61.1% | |
| Liberal | J Stevens | 1,427 | 55.5% | |
| Liberal | T Duggan | 1,392 | 54.1% | |
| Conservative | J Pentland | 1,001 | 38.9% | |
| Conservative | E Beech | 891 | 34.6% | |
| Conservative | R Mason | 861 | 33.5% | |
| Majority | | 570,426,391 | 22.2%,16.6%,15.2% | |
