= 1961 Birmingham Small Heath by-election =

UK Parliamentary by-election

The 1961 Birmingham Small Heath by-election was held on 23 March 1961 due to the death of the incumbent Labour MP William Wheeldon. It was won by the Labour candidate Denis Howell.

== Result ==
By-Election 23 March 1961: Birmingham Small Heath
Party	Candidate	Votes	%	±%
Labour	Denis Howell	12,182	59.2	+1.8
Conservative	Bernard Charles Owens	5,923	28.8	−13.8
Liberal	W. Kirk	2,476	12.0	New
Majority		6,259	30.4	+15.6
Turnout		20,581	42.6	−23.1
Labour hold		Swing	−7.8	
