= William Eaton, 2nd Baron Cheylesmore =

William Meriton Eaton, 2nd Baron Cheylesmore (15 January 1843 – 10 July 1902) is best remembered as a leading collector of English mezzotint portraits, and collector of other art. His mezzotints and other prints, over 10,000 in number, were left to the British Museum, and five oil paintings to the National Gallery, London. He also stood unsuccessfully for Parliament for the Conservative Party at Macclesfield in 1868, 1874 and 1880, and held a nominal partnership in the family silk business.

As his elder brother had predeceased him, he became 2nd Baron Cheylesmore, which is pronounced "Chylsmore", in 1891 on the death of his father Henry William Eaton, 1st Baron Cheylesmore (1816–1891). He never married, and was succeeded by his younger brother Herbert, a major-general and sportsman.

== Early and private life ==
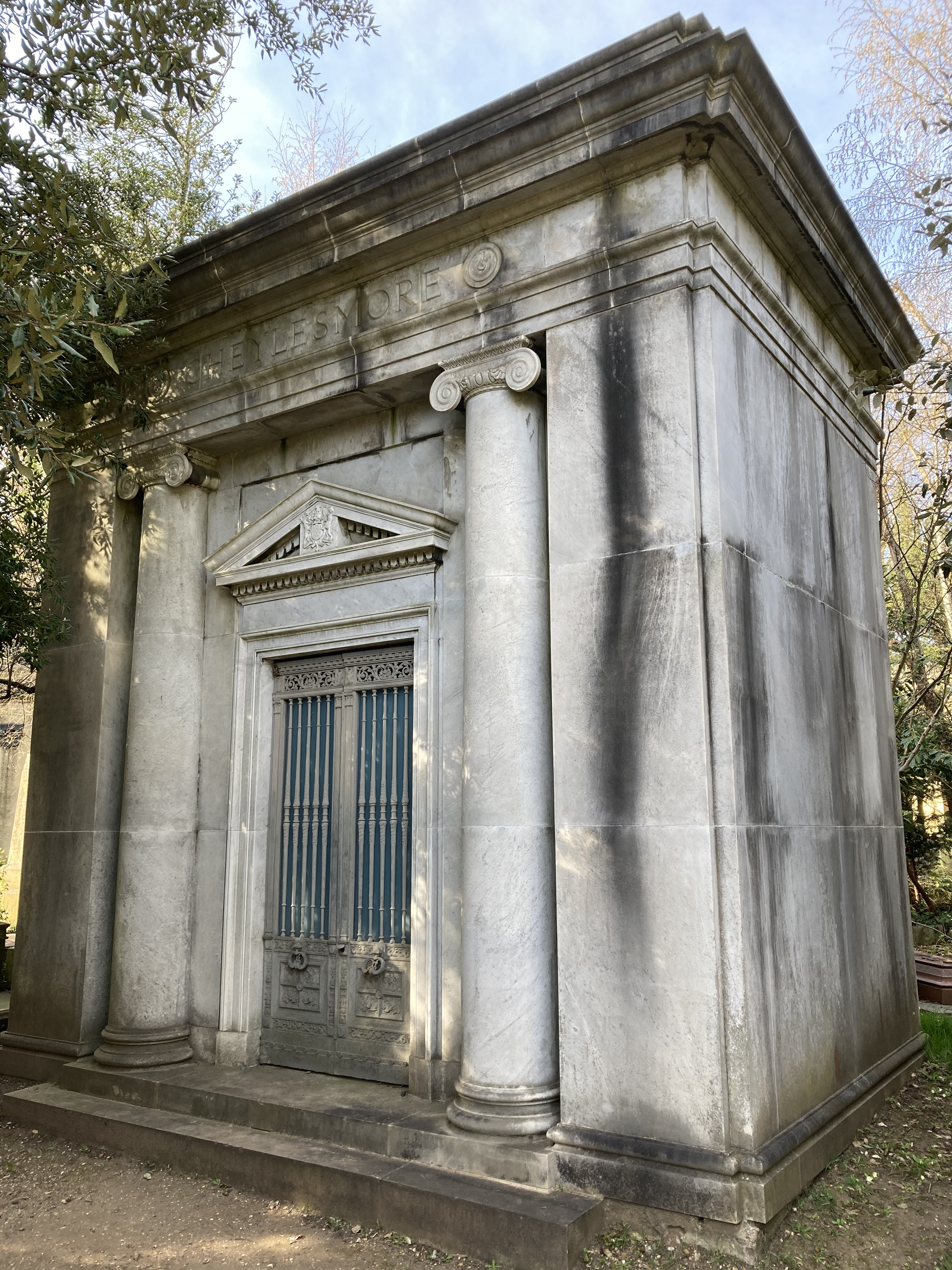
Cheylesmore mausoleum in Highgate Cemetery

Eaton was born in 9 Gloucester Place near Regent's Park, the second of three sons of Henry William Eaton and his wife Charlotte Gorham (née Harman). His parent also had two daughters. His maternal grandfather was from New Orleans.

His father founded the family silk business, H. W. Eaton & Son, was a Conservative Member of Parliament for Coventry, and became Baron Cheylesmore in 1877, the year of Queen Victoria's Golden Jubilee. His mother died in 1877. His elder brother had died before his father's death in 1891, when Eaton inherited the peerage.

He was educated at Eton College and then joined the family silk brokerage, but had little interest in the business. He spent most of his time on politics, standing but failing to be elected to Parliament three times, and then with much greater success on art collecting. He was a trustee of the Chantrey Bequest.

He died at home in London on 10 July 1902, and was buried on the western side of High gate Cemetery, with his body later interred in the Cheylesmore Mausoleum, built in 1926 for his brother, Herbert Eaton, 3rd Baron Cheylesmore.

== Collecting ==
=== Mezzotints ===
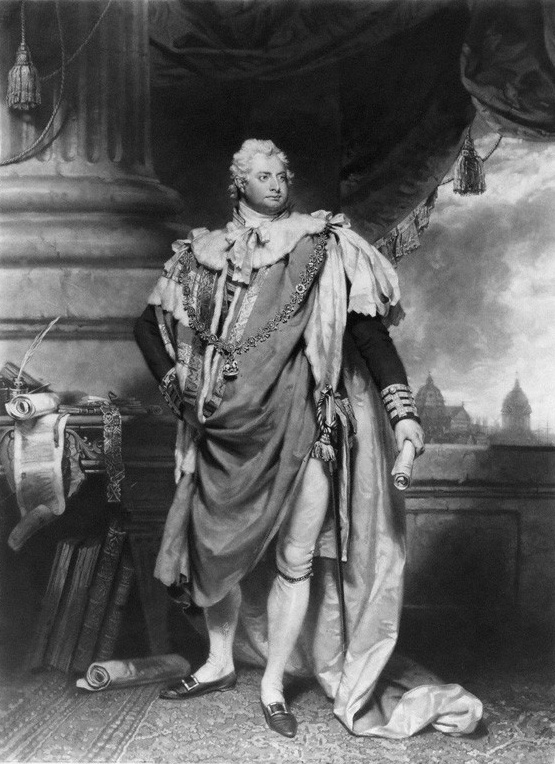
Mezzotint by James Ward, after Martin Archer Shee, of the Duke of Clarence, later William IV, 1801

Eaton seems to have begun collecting seriously in the 1870s, and a visitor in 1902 reported that his house in Prince's Gate was dominated by his collection, the best hanging in frames such that there was "no more hanging room", and others were "stacked in great heaps" or in "great portfolios". By the standards of art-collecting peers, Cheylesmore was not rich, and in 1902 his estate was valued for probate at £51,476, "even in 1902 not a very great sum". Most of his prints cost under a pound, with only a "few dozen" costing more than £10, and the top price paid £94.16.3 at a sale at Christie's in 1895. He evidently enjoyed a bargain, and his careful catalogue of his collection notes many higher prices paid at auction for prints he had bought for little.

British mezzotint collecting was a great craze from about 1760 to the Great Crash of 1929, also spreading to America. The main area of collecting was British portraits; popular oil paintings from the Royal Academy Summer Exhibition were routinely, and profitably, reproduced in mezzotint throughout this period, and other mezzotinters reproduced older portraits of historical figures, or if necessary made them up. The favourite period to collect was roughly from 1750 to 1820, the great period of the British portrait. There were two basic styles of collection: some concentrated on making a complete collection of material within a certain scope, while others aimed at perfect condition and quality (which declines in mezzotints after a relatively small number of impressions are taken from a plate), and in collecting the many "proof states" which artists and printers had obligingly provided for them from early on.

Cheylesmore began as the first type of collector, but in his last years "the balance of his interest had swung more decisively towards technique rather than subject", and his bequest specified the collection should be arranged by artist rather than subject. This may be part of the reason why, though a will of 1896 bequeathed his mezzotint collection to the National Portrait Gallery, in 1900 a codicil had transferred the bequest to the British Museum, very likely after being wooed by Sidney Colvin, Keeper of Prints and Drawings, and Alfred Whitman, superintendent of the Print Room and a writer on mezzotints. The collection of over 10,000 mezzotints, valued at £30,000, doubled the museum's holdings, and was the subject of a small special exhibition of 69 prints in 1903, while cataloguing and mounting continued, and then a larger exhibition of 641 in 1905. Colvin reported that it was the largest collection ever brought together, with "a large proportion of the rarest and a not inconsiderable proportion of the finest" mezzotints. and described by the Oxford Dictionary of National Biography as "the finest private mezzotint collection ever formed"

Cheylesmore assisted John Chaloner Smith in compiling his catalogue British Mezzotinto Portraits ... with Biographical Notes (London, 1878–84, 4 pts.), which "remains the definitive catalogue of the subject" up to 1820. He was a member of the committee of the Burlington Fine Arts Club, where he exhibited some of his prints in 1902.

=== Oil paintings ===
The five paintings left to the National Gallery in 1902 included four bought at his father's sale at Christie's in May 1892. He did not buy the star of the sale, The Monarch of the Glen (lot 42, £7,245) by Sir Edwin Landseer, one of the most popular paintings of the age. But he bought two other Landseers, of the 31 in the 86 lot sale, and two of the next most expensive works, The Execution of Lady Jane Grey (1833) by Paul Delaroche (lot 78, £1,575), and Cromer Sands by William Collins (lot 15, £2,205), now in Tate Britain. The Jan Both A Rocky Landscape with an Ox-Cart was not in his father's sale. The two Landseers were returned to his brother by the National Gallery as not wanted in the collection, despite The Highland Flood (lot 60, now Aberdeen Art Gallery) having cost £1,680, more than the Delaroche ten years earlier; the other was Study of a Dead Grouse (lot 50, £367.10), which had been presented by the artist.

== Notes ==
Peerage of the United Kingdom
Preceded by Henry Eaton	Baron Cheylesmore; 1891–1902	Succeeded by Herbert Eaton
