= Ernest Walter Hampton =

British co-operative activist

Ernest Walter Hampton (11 January 1885 – 1 January 1960) was a British co-operative activist.

Hampton was born in Bristol, to Joseph Hampton and Ellen Brown, and baptised Roman Catholic. He attended Ruskin College in Oxford, receiving a Diploma of Economics and Political Science accredited by the University of Oxford. He became involved in the co-operative movement, and served as the chairman of Co-operative Builders, based in Birmingham. While there, he became politically active with the Co-operative Party.

In 1919, Hampton was one of the first three Co-operative Party candidates elected to Birmingham City Council, winning the Balsall Heath ward, holding the seat for three years. The Co-operative Party soon allied with the Labour Party, and in 1921/22, Hampton was secretary of the Birmingham Labour Party group. He stood as a joint Labour Co-operative candidate in Birmingham Sparkbrook at the 1922 United Kingdom general election, taking third place with 23.4% of the vote. In the 1923 United Kingdom general election, he stood again, but this time as a Labour Party candidate, sponsored by the National Union of Clerks. He improved his vote share slightly, to 24.6%, and moved up to second place.

In 1928, Hampton wrote a history of co-operation in Birmingham. He became the area organiser for the co-operative movement, but he moved away from the district in 1930.

He died in 1960 in Evesham, Worcestershire.
