= Fred Longden =

British politician (1894–1952)

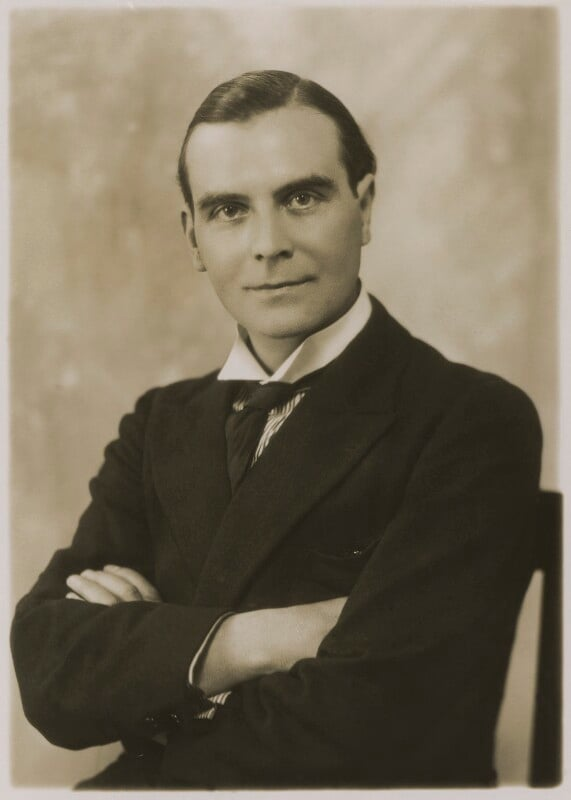
- Longden in 1929

Member of Parliament for Birmingham Small Heath
- In office 23 February 1950 – 5 October 1952
- Preceded by: Wesley Perrins (Birmingham Yardley)
- Succeeded by: William Wheeldon

Member of Parliament for Birmingham Deritend
- In office 26 July 1945 – 23 February 1950
- Preceded by: Smedley Crooke
- Succeeded by: Constituency abolished
- In office 30 May 1929 – 27 October 1931
- Preceded by: Smedley Crooke
- Succeeded by: Smedley Crooke

Personal details
- Born: 23 February 1894 Ashton-under-Lyne, Lancashire, UK
- Died: 5 October 1952 (aged 58)
- Party: Labour and Co-operative
- Other political affiliations: Independent Labour Party
- Education: Ruskin College, Oxford

Fred Longden (23 February 1894 – 5 October 1952) was a British Labour and Co-operative politician.

== Early life and career ==
Born and brought up in Ashton-under-Lyne, Lancashire, and educated at elementary school, he began work aged 13 as a moulder-apprentice, joining the Moulders' Union in 1914. In the same year he was awarded a place at Ruskin College, Oxford. He also joined the Independent Labour Party and was elected to its National Council.

In the First World War he became active in the Union of Democratic Control, and was arrested for making a speech appealing for immediate peace negotiations. In 1916 he was offered the chance of exemption from military service on trade and health grounds, but preferred to take his stand as a conscientious objector. Refused exemption in that category, he was forcibly enlisted, and sentenced to two years imprisonment for disobeying an order; he then accepted the Home Office Scheme, and was transferred to Princetown Work Centre in the erstwhile Dartmoor Prison.

== Political career ==
Fred Longden was elected Member of Parliament for Birmingham Deritend, 1929-1931 and 1945–1950, and then in 1950 for Birmingham Small Heath, which he retained until his death in 1952 aged 58.

Parliament of the United Kingdom
Preceded by Smedley Crooke	Member of Parliament for Birmingham Deritend; 1929–1931	Succeeded by Smedley Crooke
Preceded by Smedley Crooke	Member of Parliament for Birmingham Deritend; 1945–1950	Constituency abolished
Preceded by Wesley Perrins as MP for Birmingham Yardley	Member of Parliament for Birmingham Small Heath; 1950–1952	Succeeded by William Wheeldon
Party political offices
Preceded by George Banton	Midlands Division representative on the National Administrative Council of the Independent Labour Party; 1925–1927	Succeeded by E. F. Wise
