= Nischal =

Nischal or Nischol is a name of Indian origin. It is also a given name used in India and Nepal.

== Surname ==
- Dega Nischal, Indian cricketer
- Paul Nischal, a politician from the United Kingdom
- Navin Nischol, Indian actor
- Praveen Nischol, Indian producer, director and writer

== Given name ==
- Nischal Basnet, a Nepalese film personality
