= Birmingham Sparkbrook and Small Heath =

UK Parliament constituency (1997–2010)

Coordinates: 52.457°N 1.847°W

Birmingham, Sparkbrook and Small Heath
- Former borough constituency for the House of Commons
- Boundary of Birmingham, Sparkbrook and Small Heath in Birmingham for the 2005 general election

- Location of Birmingham within England
- County: West Midlands

1997–2010
- Created from: Birmingham Sparkbrook and Birmingham Small Heath
- Replaced by: Birmingham Hall Green

Birmingham, Sparkbrook and Small Heath was a parliamentary constituency represented in the House of Commons of the Parliament of the United Kingdom. It elected one Member of Parliament (MP) by the first-past-the-post system of election. The constituency was notable for having the largest percentage of Muslim voters of any UK constituency at 48.8% (based on 2001 census figures).

The seat was abolished following a review of parliamentary boundaries by the Boundary Commission for England.

== Boundaries ==
The City of Birmingham wards of Fox Hollies, Small Heath, Sparkbrook, and Sparkhill.

This was an inner-city residential seat in the south-east of Birmingham, noted for its large immigrant population.

In the first half of the 20th century, it was home to many Irish families. In more recent times it is populated by people of Asian origin, who now account for some 50% of residents—the highest proportion of any seat in the country. The majority of ethnic minorities in this area are of Pakistani and British Pakistani origin.

By 2010, unemployment was high, at well over 10%. There are hardly any white collar workers in the seat and it has the third highest proportion of only partly skilled workers in the country.

However, it is a major site for urban regeneration and some £35m is to be invested in local redevelopment initiatives over the next five years.

The constituency was historically a safe seat for Labour, but in 2005 their incumbent MP Roger Godsiff saw his majority slashed to just over 3,000 following a strong challenge from RESPECT. Labour also lost many local council seats in the constituency, primarily to the Liberal Democrats but also to the now-defunct People's Justice Party and later to RESPECT's Salma Yaqoob in the Sparkbrook ward.

=== Boundary review ===
Following their review of parliamentary representation in Birmingham and the West Midlands, the Boundary Commission for England abolished the Sparkbrook and Small Heath constituency.

The Sparkbrook electoral ward formed one part of a revised Birmingham Hall Green constituency. The incumbent MP Roger Godsiff was selected for the new Hall Green seat, and won the seat at the 2010 election.

== Members of Parliament ==
Roger Godsiff of the Labour Party represented this seat throughout its existence. From 1992 he had been MP for Birmingham Small Heath, which was merged with Birmingham Sparkbrook to create this seat.

| Election | Member | Party |
|---|---|---|
| 1997 | Roger Godsiff | Labour |
| 2010 | constituency abolished: see Birmingham Hall Green | |

== Elections ==
=== Elections in the 2000s ===
General election 2005: Birmingham, Sparkbrook and Small Heath
| Party | Candidate | Votes | % | ±% |
|---|---|---|---|---|
| Labour | Roger Godsiff | 13,787 | 36.1 | −21.4 |
| Respect | Salma Yaqoob | 10,498 | 27.5 | New |
| Liberal Democrats | Talib Hussain | 7,727 | 20.2 | +7.0 |
| Conservative | Sameer Mirza | 3,480 | 9.1 | −1.7 |
| UKIP | Jennifer Brookes | 1,342 | 3.5 | +1.8 |
| Green | Ian Jamieson | 855 | 2.2 | New |
| Independent | Abdul Chaudhary | 503 | 1.3 | N/A |
| Majority | | 3,289 | 8.6 | −35.7 |
| Turnout | | 38,192 | 51.8 | +2.5 |
| Labour hold | | Swing | −24.4 | |

General election 2001: Birmingham, Sparkbrook and Small Heath
| Party | Candidate | Votes | % | ±% |
|---|---|---|---|---|
| Labour | Roger Godsiff | 21,087 | 57.5 | −6.8 |
| Liberal Democrats | Qassim Afzal | 4,841 | 13.2 | +3.9 |
| People's Justice | Shafaq Hussain | 4,770 | 13.0 | New |
| Conservative | Iftkhar Hussain | 3,948 | 10.8 | −6.7 |
| Independent | Gul Mahammed | 662 | 1.8 | N/A |
| UKIP | Wayne Vincent | 634 | 1.7 | New |
| Muslim Party | Abdul Aziz | 401 | 1.1 | New |
| Socialist Alliance | Salman Mirza | 304 | 0.8 | New |
| Majority | | 16,246 | 44.3 | −2.5 |
| Turnout | | 36,647 | 49.3 | −7.7 |
| Labour hold | | Swing | | |

=== Elections in the 1990s ===
General election 1997: Birmingham, Sparkbrook and Small Heath
| Party | Candidate | Votes | % | ±% |
|---|---|---|---|---|
| Labour | Roger Godsiff | 26,841 | 64.3 | |
| Conservative | Kenneth Hardeman | 7,315 | 17.5 | |
| Liberal Democrats | Roger Harmer | 3,889 | 9.3 | |
| Green | Alan Clawley | 959 | 2.3 | |
| Referendum | Riaz Dooley | 737 | 1.8 | |
| Independent | Pankaj Patel | 538 | 1.3 | |
| Independent | Rashid Syed | 513 | 1.2 | |
| Independent | Sajada Bi | 490 | 1.2 | |
| Socialist Labour | Colin Wren | 483 | 1.2 | |
| Majority | | 19,526 | 46.8 | |
| Turnout | | 41,765 | 57.0 | |
| Labour win (new seat) | | | | |

== See also ==
- List of parliamentary constituencies in the West Midlands (county)
- Sparkbrook and Small Heath
