= Baron Cheylesmore =

Title in the Peerage of the United Kingdom

Baron Cheylesmore, of Cheylesmore in the City of Coventry and County of Warwick, was a title in the Peerage of the United Kingdom. It was created on 9 July 1887 for the businessman and Conservative politician Henry Eaton. He had earlier represented Coventry in the House of Commons. He was succeeded by his second but oldest surviving son, William Meriton Eaton, the second Baron, and a notable collector of mezzotints. William Eaton unsuccessfully contested Macclesfield as a Conservative in 1868, 1874 and 1880. He never married and on his death in 1902 the title passed to his younger brother, Herbert Francis Eaton, the third Baron. He was a Major-General in the Grenadier Guards and also served as chairman of the London County Council from 1912 to 1913. He was succeeded by his son Francis Ormond Henry Eaton, the fourth Baron. He fought in both world wars and was awarded the Distinguished Service Order. The fourth Baron Cheylesmore was childless and on his death in 1974 the barony became extinct.

The title of the barony is pronounced [ˈtʃaɪɫzmɔː] (chiles-more).

== Barons Cheylesmore (1887) ==
- Henry William Eaton, 1st Baron Cheylesmore (1816–1891)
- William Meriton Eaton, 2nd Baron Cheylesmore (1843–1902)
- Herbert Francis Eaton, 3rd Baron Cheylesmore (1848–1925)
- Francis Ormond Henry Eaton, 4th Baron Cheylesmore (1893–1974)
