= William Wheeldon =

British co-operator and politician (1898-1960)

William Edwin Wheeldon (20 February 1898 – 7 October 1960) was a British co-operator and municipal politician from Small Heath Borough Constituency in Birmingham who later became a Member of Parliament.

Wheeldon was born in Crewe. After attending the elementary school he joined the Royal Flying Corps at the start of the First World War, transferring to the Royal Air Force in 1918. At the end of the war, he settled in Birmingham, where he became involved in the Cooperative movement.

His work in the Co-op included membership of the Co-operative Party. He was elected to Birmingham City Council from St Bartholomew's Ward in 1927 as a Labour and Co-operative member, and from 1935 he served as Secretary of the Birmingham and District Co-operative Party. In 1945 he was nominated as an Alderman. When Labour won control of the City Council in 1946, Wheeldon was made Chairman of the Finance Committee.

Following the death of Fred Longden, Wheeldon was elected as Labour Co-operative Member of Parliament (MP) for Birmingham Small Heath in a by-election in 1952. He specialised in local government, education, finance and housing, but was a low-profile MP. Unusually for the time, he was opposed to building tower blocks to ease the housing crisis, insisting that workers wanted to live on ground level with a bit of garden.

His health declined in 1958, and he fought the 1959 general election from a hospital bed, leaving it only on polling day to meet party workers. After a major operation in the summer of 1960 failed, Wheeldon died that October, aged 62.

Parliament of the United Kingdom
Preceded by Fred Longden	Member of Parliament for Birmingham Small Heath; 1952–1960	Succeeded by Denis Howell
