= Percy Shurmer =

Percy Lionel Edward Shurmer (1888 – 29 May 1959) was a British Labour Party politician and postal worker.

In the 1945 general election, he won the Birmingham Sparkbrook constituency from the Conservative Member of Parliament, Leo Amery. Shurmer held the seat until death some months before the 1959 general election, when it was regained by the Conservatives.

He is commemorated by a blue plaque, erected by Birmingham Civic Society on the school named after him, Percy Shurmer Academy, near his former home, at 140 Belgrave Road in Birmingham in 2009.

Parliament of the United Kingdom
Preceded by Leo Amery	Member of Parliament for Birmingham Sparkbrook; 1945–1959	Succeeded by Leslie Seymour
