= Smedley Crooke =

British Conservative politician (1861–1951)

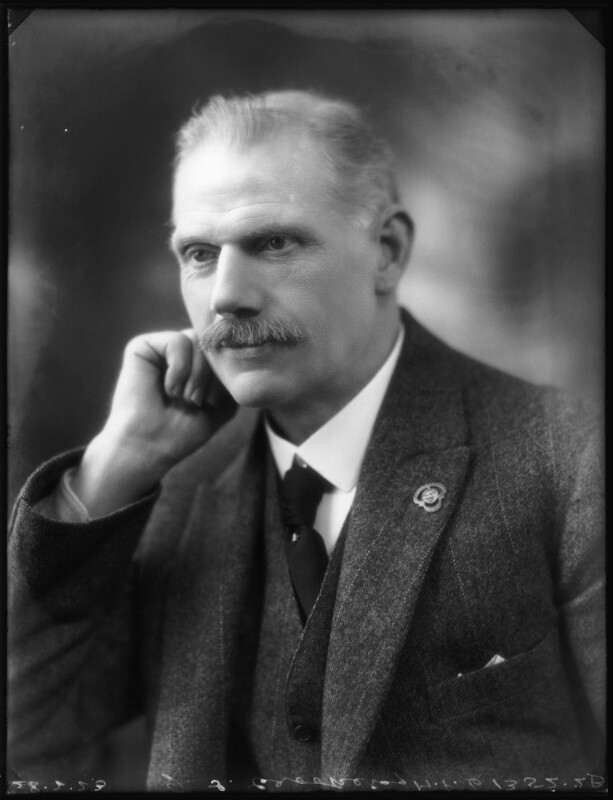
Crooke in 1923

Sir John Smedley Crooke (1861 – 13 October 1951) was a British politician. He was Conservative Member of Parliament (MP) for Birmingham Deritend from 1922 to 1929, and from 1931 to 1945. An annual football tournament named the Smedley Crooke Memorial Charity Cup was set up in his name to raise money for blind and visually impaired people. A street in Hopwood, Worcestershire also bears his name.

Parliament of the United Kingdom
| Preceded by John William Dennis | Member of Parliament for Birmingham Deritend; 1922 – 1929 | Succeeded by Fred Longden |
| Preceded by Fred Longden | Member of Parliament for Birmingham Deritend; 1931 – 1945 | Succeeded by Fred Longden |
