= Cheylesmore Memorial =

Memorial in London

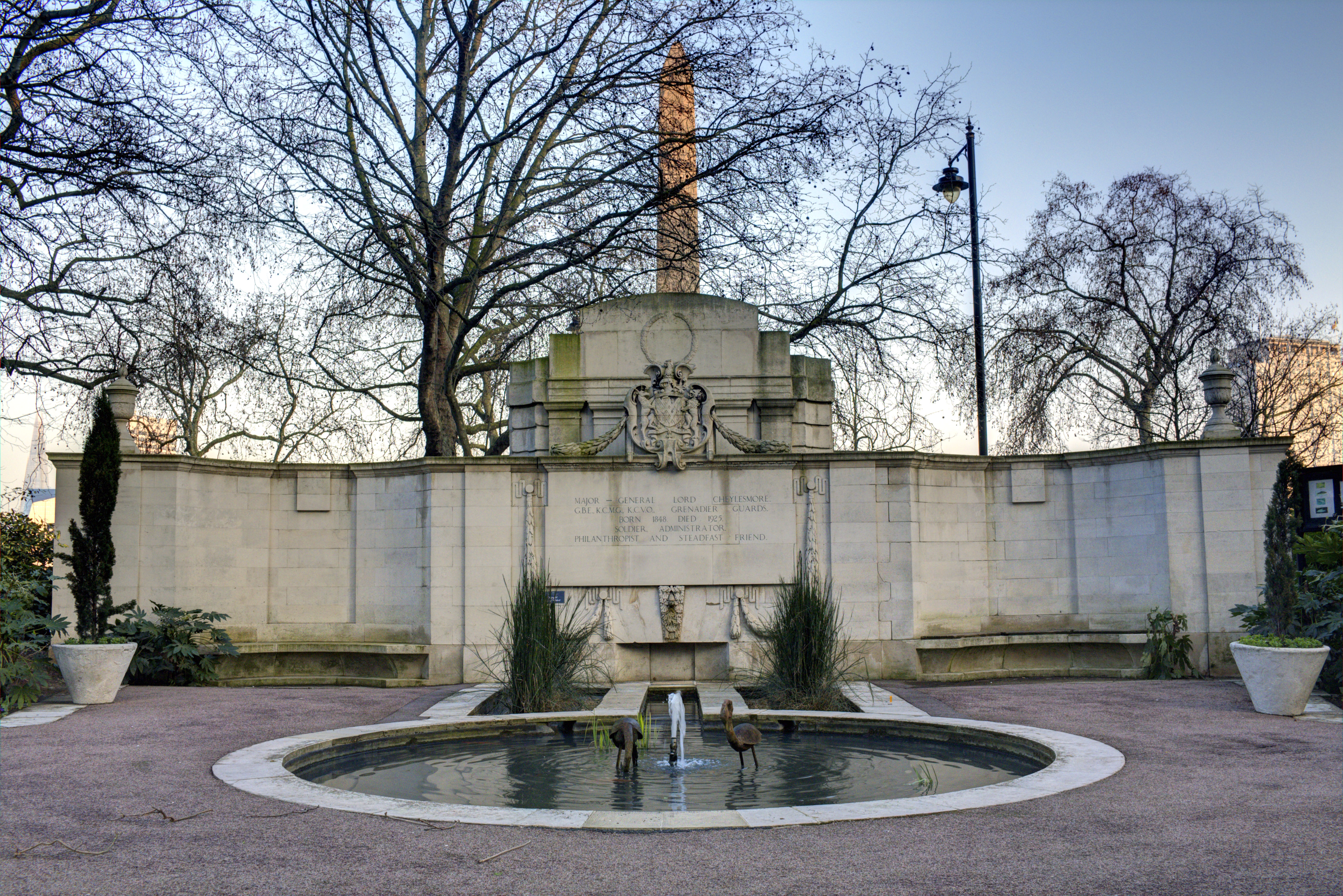
- The memorial in 2015
- Interactive map of Cheylesmore Memorial
- Location: Victoria Embankment Gardens, Westminster, London, England
- Coordinates: 51.5088°N 0.1209°W
- Designer: Edwin Lutyens
- Type: Memorial
- Material: Portland stone
- Dedicated date: 17 July 1930
- Dedicated to: Herbert Eaton, 3rd Baron Cheylesmore

The Cheylesmore Memorial is a Grade II listed outdoor stone memorial dedicated to British Army officer Herbert Eaton, 3rd Baron Cheylesmore, located in the Victoria Embankment Gardens in Westminster, London, England. The memorial was designed by Edwin Lutyens and unveiled in 1930.

At the dedication ceremony on 17 July 1930, the memorial was unveiled by Prince Arthur, Duke of Connaught and Strathearn, the third son of Queen Victoria. Those attending included John Jellicoe, 1st Earl Jellicoe and Paul Methuen, 3rd Baron Methuen.

The memorial is made of Portland stone and has seats backing on to a decorative screen facing a small pond. An inscription at the centre of the screen reads:

Major-General Lord Cheylesmore, GBE, KCMG, KCMO, Grenadier Guards. Born 1848. Died 1925. Soldier, administrator, philanthropist and steadfast friend.
