= Enid Hattersley =

Labour Party politician; Lord Mayor of Sheffield (1904–2001)

Enid Anne Hattersley (née Brackenbury; previously O'Hara; 19 September 1904 – 17 May 2001) was a Labour Party politician from Sheffield, England, who became the city's Lord Mayor in 1981.

== Early years ==
Hattersley was born in Shirebrook, Derbyshire, the daughter of a coal merchant. She was a Labour Party activist from an early age, securing her membership card at the age of 14. She managed the household for her invalid mother until she married her first husband, a miner named John O'Hara. When she was 27, Father Frederick Hattersley (known as Roy, his second name), a Roman Catholic priest who was possibly from a recusant family came to order the winter's coal for his presbytery. They fell in love in spite of his clerical vocation.

== Marriage ==
Once widowed when her first husband died, Enid O'Hara married Frederick Hattersley, who had left his vocation as a Catholic priest to maintain a relationship with her. By 1932 they had moved to Sheffield. Their only son would become the noted Labour Party politician, writer and life peer Lord Hattersley of Sparkbrook. Frederick Hattersley died in 1973.

== Political career ==
Hattersley spent some two decades on Sheffield's Libraries and Arts Committee (as Chair from 1968 to 1980). She also served four years on South Yorkshire County Council and was chairperson of governing Sheffield's first comprehensive school. She oversaw the creation of the Crucible Theatre in Sheffield. In 1979, as chairman of the Yorkshire Museums Service, she helped persuade the fiscally struggling nearby Kirklees Council not to sell off artwork by Francis Bacon and Henry Moore. In 1981, she was installed as Lord Mayor of Sheffield.

== Falklands War ==
Hattersley helped rally the city when HMS Sheffield (D80) sank during the 1982 Falklands War and she led memorials and fund-raising for the families of those killed and wounded. The Ministry of Defence set up in response its own South Atlantic Fund.

== Legacy ==
Hattersley was credited by The Telegraph for her contributions to Sheffield, specifically by helping "turn the city from one of England's grimiest cities into a modern industrial centre …as chairman of the Libraries and Arts Committee, she developed the city's museums and art galleries to the point where they gained an international reputation".
