= Jacques Abady =

British lawyer

Jacques Abady QC (2 October 1872 – 15 April 1964) was a British lawyer.

== Early life ==
Born on 2 October 1872, into a Syrian Jewish family, Abady was educated at Manchester Grammar School and the Birkbeck Institute. His first vocation was as an engineer, becoming a Member of the Institute of Mechanical Engineering and inventing several scientific instruments.

== Legal career ==
Later, Abady decided to pursue a legal career, and was called to the bar by the Middle Temple in 1905. He became a bencher of the Middle Temple in 1941. He was a member of Westminster City Council between 1906 and 1912, and then again from 1916 to 1959, also serving as the Mayor of Westminster in 1927–1928.

== Death ==
Abady died in Sussex on 15 April 1964, at the age of 91.

== Personal life ==
Abady had one son with his wife. In his spare time, Abady enjoyed writing thrillers and plays. He was a member of the Hurlingham Club and the Constitutional Club.
