= Molly Hattersley =

British educationist (1931–2016)

Molly Hattersley (née Edith Mary Loughran; 5 February 1931 – 10 May 2016) was a British education consultant. She was previously a teacher and headteacher, noted for shaping education policy, having overseen experimental desegregation of the British school system in the 1970s under the Labour government. In 1956, she married Labour Party minister Roy Hattersley.

== Career ==
Hattersley was deputy headteacher of Myers Grove the first comprehensive school in Sheffield. As headteacher of Creighton School from 1974, Molly Hattersley oversaw the centrepiece of a Labour Party educational experiment. With Creighton situated in the middle-class, largely white suburb of Muswell Hill, it was decided to integrate a large number of Afro-Caribbean and other ethnic minority children into the school from distant parts of the borough in an attempt to maximise education choice and social interaction – a policy based heavily on the United States' then-current system of desegregation busing. In 1975, before this new intake had worked through the school, around one-third of the Sixth Form was either a first-generation immigrant, or had a surname of Cypriot or Asian origin.

In the early 1980s, Hattersley appeared in Gender, a documentary on equality in the education system.

From 1990, Hattersley worked as an educational consultant, also serving as a visiting fellow at the Institute of Education, University of London (Management Development Centre). She also worked at the London School of Economics and Political Science.

== Publications and talks ==
Hattersley was the author of The Appraisal of Headteachers (1992) ISBN 978-0304324491. She published in educational journals including Management in Education, and gave talks on equal opportunities in education.

== Personal life and death ==
Molly Hattersley was born on 5 February 1931, the daughter of Michael and Sally Loughran. She was the wife of Labour Party minister Roy Hattersley, whom she married in 1956. After living in London they moved in 1997 to Bakewell in Derbyshire. They divorced in April 2013 after 57 years of marriage, having been separated for five years. They had no children.

Molly Hattersley died in London on 10 May 2016, aged 85.
