= Sparkbrook and Small Heath =

Defunct administrative district in Birmingham, England

Coordinates: 52.4638°N 1.8752°W

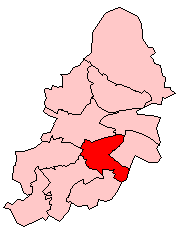
Former Sparkbrook and Small Heath constituency shown within Birmingham

Sparkbrook and Small Heath is a defunct administrative district, formerly managed by its own district committee, in Birmingham, England.

Its boundaries were those of the Birmingham Sparkbrook and Small Heath parliamentary constituency.
