= Birmingham Small Heath =

Parliamentary constituency in the United Kingdom, 1950–1997

- Former borough constituency for the House of Commons
- County: West Midlands

1950–1997
- Seats: One
- Created from: Birmingham Yardley (Majority), Birmingham Deritend (Part) and Birmingham Duddeston (Part)
- Replaced by: Birmingham Sparkbrook and Small Heath and Birmingham Ladywood

Birmingham Small Heath was a parliamentary constituency centred on the Small Heath area of Birmingham. It returned one Member of Parliament (MP) to the House of Commons of the Parliament of the United Kingdom.

The constituency was created for the 1950 general election, and abolished for the 1997 general election, when it was partly replaced by the new Birmingham Sparkbrook and Small Heath.

== Boundaries ==
Throughout its existence the constituency (as can be inferred from its name) included Small Heath ward, but that district was linked with various adjoining parts of the inner-city area of Birmingham. In its first three incarnations the constituency was to the south east of the city centre. Its boundaries moved more to the east of the city centre in the 1983 redistribution.

1950–1955: The County Borough of Birmingham wards of Duddeston, Saltley, and Small Heath. Before 1950 Duddeston ward had been part of Birmingham Duddeston and the other two wards had been part of Birmingham Yardley.

1955–1974: The County Borough of Birmingham wards of Deritend, Saltley, and Small Heath. Deritend ward was formerly part of Birmingham Sparkbrook. Duddeston ward was transferred to Birmingham Ladywood.

1974–1983: The County Borough of Birmingham wards of Duddeston, Newtown, Saltley, and Small Heath. Duddeston ward had formerly been in Birmingham Ladywood. Deritend ward was transferred to Birmingham Edgbaston.

1983–1997: The City of Birmingham wards of Aston, Nechells, and Small Heath. 72.7% of the new constituency came from the old one, 11.9% from Birmingham Handsworth (Aston ward) and smaller amounts from Birmingham Sparkbrook (6.1%), Birmingham Erdington (4.9%), Birmingham Yardley (2.6%) and Birmingham Ladywood (1.7%).

In the 1997 redistribution, this constituency disappeared. Small Heath ward joined a new seat of Birmingham Sparkbrook and Small Heath, while Aston and Nechells wards became part of the redrawn Birmingham Ladywood.

In 1971, 17.2% were non-White. In 1981, 36% of the constituency were non-White.

== Members of Parliament ==
| Election | Member | Party | Notes |
|---|---|---|---|
| 1950 | Fred Longden | Labour | Member for Birmingham Yardley (1945–1950); Died October 1952 |
| 1952 by-election | William Wheeldon | Labour | Died October 1960 |
| 1961 by-election | Denis Howell | Labour | Member for Birmingham All Saints (1955–59); Minister for Sport (1964–70 & 1974–79) |
| 1992 | Roger Godsiff | Labour | Contested Birmingham Sparkbrook and Small Heath following redistribution |
| 1997 | Constituency abolished: see Birmingham Sparkbrook and Small Heath & Birmingham Ladywood | | |

== Election results ==
=== Elections in the 1950s ===
General election 1950: Birmingham Small Heath
| Party | Candidate | Votes | % |
|---|---|---|---|
| Labour Co-op | Fred Longden | 31,985 | 62.8 |
| Conservative | J. Pagett | 15,556 | 30.6 |
| Liberal | F.G. Smith | 3,365 | 6.6 |
| Majority | | 16,429 | 32.2 |
| Turnout | | 50,906 | 79.3 |
| Registered electors | | | |
| Labour win (new seat) | | | |

General election 1951: Birmingham Small Heath
| Party | Candidate | Votes | % | ±% |
|---|---|---|---|---|
| Labour Co-op | Fred Longden | 31,079 | 63.4 | +0.6 |
| Conservative | Francis Charles Irwin | 15,156 | 30.9 | +0.3 |
| Liberal | F.G. Smith | 2,779 | 5.7 | −0.9 |
| Majority | | 15,923 | 32.5 | +0.3 |
| Turnout | | 49,014 | 77.2 | −2.1 |
| Registered electors | | | | |
| Labour Co-op hold | | Swing | +0.5 | |

1952 Birmingham Small Heath by-election
| Party | Candidate | Votes | % | ±% |
|---|---|---|---|---|
| Labour Co-op | William Wheeldon | 19,491 | 67.0 | +3.6 |
| Conservative | Edith Pitt | 9,614 | 33.0 | +2.1 |
| Majority | | 9,877 | 34.0 | +1.5 |
| Turnout | | 29,105 | 46.6 | −30.6 |
| Registered electors | | | | |
| Labour Co-op hold | | Swing | −2.9 | |

General election 1955: Birmingham Small Heath
| Party | Candidate | Votes | % |
|---|---|---|---|
| Labour Co-op | William Wheeldon | 22,444 | 60.8 |
| Conservative | John Bissell | 14,484 | 39.2 |
| Majority | | 7,960 | 21.6 |
| Turnout | | 36,928 | 65.8 |
| Registered electors | | | |
| Labour Co-op win (new boundaries) | | | |

General election 1959: Birmingham Small Heath
| Party | Candidate | Votes | % | ±% |
|---|---|---|---|---|
| Labour Co-op | William Wheeldon | 19,213 | 57.4 | −3.4 |
| Conservative | Bernard Charles Owens | 14,282 | 42.6 | +3.4 |
| Majority | | 4,931 | 14.8 | −6.8 |
| Turnout | | 33,495 | 65.7 | −0.1 |
| Registered electors | | | | |
| Labour Co-op hold | | Swing | −3.4 | |

=== Elections in the 1960s ===
1961 Birmingham Small Heath by-election
| Party | Candidate | Votes | % | ±% |
|---|---|---|---|---|
| Labour | Denis Howell | 12,182 | 59.2 | +1.8 |
| Conservative | Bernard Charles Owens | 5,923 | 28.8 | −13.8 |
| Liberal | W. Kirk | 2,476 | 12.0 | New |
| Majority | | 6,259 | 30.4 | +15.6 |
| Turnout | | 20,581 | 42.6 | −23.1 |
| Registered electors | | | | |
| Labour hold | | Swing | −7.8 | |

General election 1964: Birmingham Small Heath
| Party | Candidate | Votes | % | ±% |
|---|---|---|---|---|
| Labour | Denis Howell | 17,010 | 60.4 | +3.0 |
| Conservative | Anthony J Prescott | 10,233 | 36.3 | −6.3 |
| Communist | George Jelf | 926 | 3.3 | New |
| Majority | | 6,777 | 24.1 | +9.3 |
| Turnout | | 28,169 | 60.9 | +18.2 |
| Registered electors | | | | |
| Labour hold | | Swing | +4.4 | |

General election 1966: Birmingham Small Heath
| Party | Candidate | Votes | % | ±% |
|---|---|---|---|---|
| Labour | Denis Howell | 18,075 | 69.5 | +9.1 |
| Conservative | Francis Goodhart | 7,471 | 28.7 | −7.6 |
| Communist | George Jelf | 477 | 1.8 | −1.5 |
| Majority | | 10,604 | 40.8 | +16.7 |
| Turnout | | 26,023 | 59.6 | −1.3 |
| Registered electors | | | | |
| Labour hold | | Swing | +8.4 | |

=== Elections in the 1970s ===
General election 1970: Birmingham Small Heath
| Party | Candidate | Votes | % | ±% |
|---|---|---|---|---|
| Labour | Denis Howell | 13,794 | 61.1 | −8.4 |
| Conservative | Nicholas Budgen | 6,923 | 30.6 | +1.9 |
| Liberal | Gordon Herringshaw | 1,754 | 7.8 | New |
| British Commonwealth | Saeeduz Zafar | 117 | 0.5 | New |
| Majority | | 6,871 | 30.5 | −10.3 |
| Turnout | | 22,588 | 57.9 | −1.7 |
| Registered electors | | | | |
| Labour hold | | Swing | −5.2 | |

1970 notional result
| Party | Vote | % |
|---|---|---|
| Labour | 18,300 | 54.8 |
| Conservative | 9,100 | 27.2 |
| Liberal | 6,000 | 18.0 |
| Turnout | 33,400 | 59.5 |
| Electorate | 56,161 | |

General election February 1974: Birmingham Small Heath
| Party | Candidate | Votes | % | ±% |
|---|---|---|---|---|
| Labour | Denis Howell | 19,319 | 57.3 | +2.5 |
| Liberal | D.G. Minnis | 7,441 | 22.1 | +4.1 |
| Conservative | R. O'Connor | 6,941 | 20.6 | –6.6 |
| Majority | | 11,878 | 35.2 | +4.7 |
| Turnout | | 33,701 | 66.0 | +6.6 |
| Registered electors | | 51,038 | | –5,123 |
| Labour hold | | Swing | –0.8 | |

General election October 1974: Birmingham Small Heath
| Party | Candidate | Votes | % | ±% |
|---|---|---|---|---|
| Labour | Denis Howell | 19,703 | 66.5 | +9.2 |
| Conservative | R. O'Connor | 5,648 | 19.1 | −1.5 |
| Liberal | D. Caney | 4,260 | 14.4 | −7.7 |
| Majority | | 14,055 | 47.4 | +12.2 |
| Turnout | | 29,611 | 57.6 | −8.4 |
| Registered electors | | | | |
| Labour hold | | Swing | +5.4 | |

General election 1979: Birmingham Small Heath
| Party | Candidate | Votes | % | ±% |
|---|---|---|---|---|
| Labour | Denis Howell | 17,735 | 60.5 | −6.0 |
| Conservative | D.J. Savage | 6,268 | 21.4 | +2.3 |
| Liberal | D.G. Minnis | 4,470 | 15.2 | +0.8 |
| National Front | M. Caffery | 490 | 1.7 | New |
| Socialist Unity | C.C. Adamson | 349 | 1.2 | New |
| Majority | | 11,467 | 39.1 | −8.3 |
| Turnout | | 29,312 | 62.9 | +5.3 |
| Registered electors | | | | |
| Labour hold | | Swing | −4.2 | |

=== Elections in the 1980s ===
1979 notional result
| Party | Vote | % |
|---|---|---|
| Labour | 23,889 | 64.1 |
| Conservative | 7,637 | 20.5 |
| Liberal | 4,864 | 13.0 |
| Others | 883 | 2.4 |
| Turnout | 37,273 | |
| Electorate | | |

General election 1983: Birmingham Small Heath
| Party | Candidate | Votes | % | ±% |
|---|---|---|---|---|
| Labour | Denis Howell | 22,874 | 63.8 | –0.3 |
| Conservative | Paul Nischal | 7,262 | 20.2 | –0.2 |
| SDP | Andrew Bostock | 5,722 | 16.0 | +2.9 |
| Majority | | 15,612 | 43.6 | +4.5 |
| Turnout | | 35,858 | 60.4 | –0.1 |
| Registered electors | | 57,707 | | |
| Labour hold | | Swing | –0.0 | |

General election 1987: Birmingham Small Heath
| Party | Candidate | Votes | % | ±% |
|---|---|---|---|---|
| Labour | Denis Howell | 22,787 | 66.3 | +2.5 |
| Conservative | Paul Nischal | 7,266 | 21.1 | +0.9 |
| Liberal | John Hemming | 3,600 | 10.5 | −5.5 |
| Green | Alan Clawley | 559 | 1.6 | New |
| Communist | Peter Sheppard | 154 | 0.5 | New |
| Majority | | 15,521 | 45.2 | +1.6 |
| Turnout | | 34,366 | 60.6 | +0.2 |
| Registered electors | | | | |
| Labour hold | | Swing | +1.7 | |

=== Elections in the 1990s ===
General election 1992: Birmingham Small Heath
| Party | Candidate | Votes | % | ±% |
|---|---|---|---|---|
| Labour | Roger Godsiff | 22,675 | 65.3 | −1.0 |
| Conservative | Abdul Chaudhary | 8,686 | 24.8 | +3.7 |
| Liberal Democrats | Haydn A. Thomas | 2,515 | 7.2 | −3.3 |
| Green | Hazel M. Clawley | 824 | 2.4 | +0.8 |
| Majority | | 13,989 | 40.5 | −4.7 |
| Turnout | | 34,700 | 62.8 | +2.2 |
| Registered electors | | | | |
| Labour hold | | Swing | −2.4 | |

== See also ==
- List of former United Kingdom Parliament constituencies
