= Herbert Eaton, 3rd Baron Cheylesmore =

British baron and Army officer (1848–1925)

Major-General The Right Honourable The Lord Cheylesmore GBE KCMG KCVO KStJ
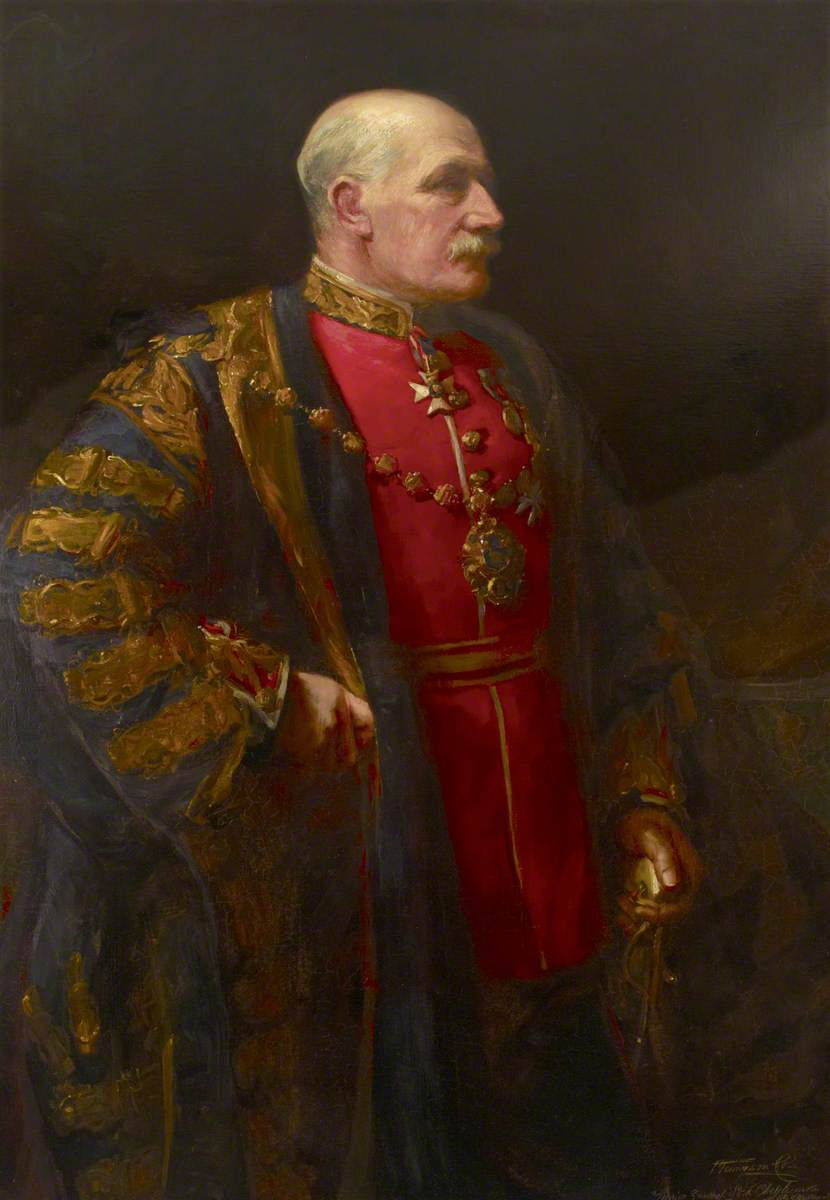
- Cheylesmore in 1906 as mayor of Westminster, by Tennyson Cole
- Born: 25 January 1848; London
- Died: 29 July 1925 (aged 77); Cottage Hospital, Englefield Green
- Education: Eton College
- Spouse: Elizabeth French (m. 1892–1925)
- Children: 2
- Military career
- Allegiance: United Kingdom
- Branch: British Army
- Service years: 1867–1906; 1914–1918
- Rank: Major-General
- Nickname: Brown
- Unit: Grenadier Guards
- Commands: 2nd Battalion Grenadier Guards (1890–1894)
- Conflicts: First World War
- Other work: Chairman of the National Rifle Association

Herbert Francis Eaton, 3rd Baron Cheylesmore (25 January 1848 – 29 July 1925) was a British Army officer, sportsman, and peer. He was Chairman of London County Council, chairman of the National Rifle Association and presided over courts martial during the First World War.

== Early life ==
Eaton was the son of Henry Eaton, 1st Baron Cheylesmore and his wife Charlotte Gorham Harman. His father made money in the silk trade, helped to manage insurance companies, and was MP for Coventry. Eaton was educated at Eton in Mr. Warre's house. He was nicknamed "Cheeky Eaton" and rowed bow in the winning Eton House four crew in 1866. He also a marksman and shot for Eton in the Ashburton Shield in 1866.

== Military career ==
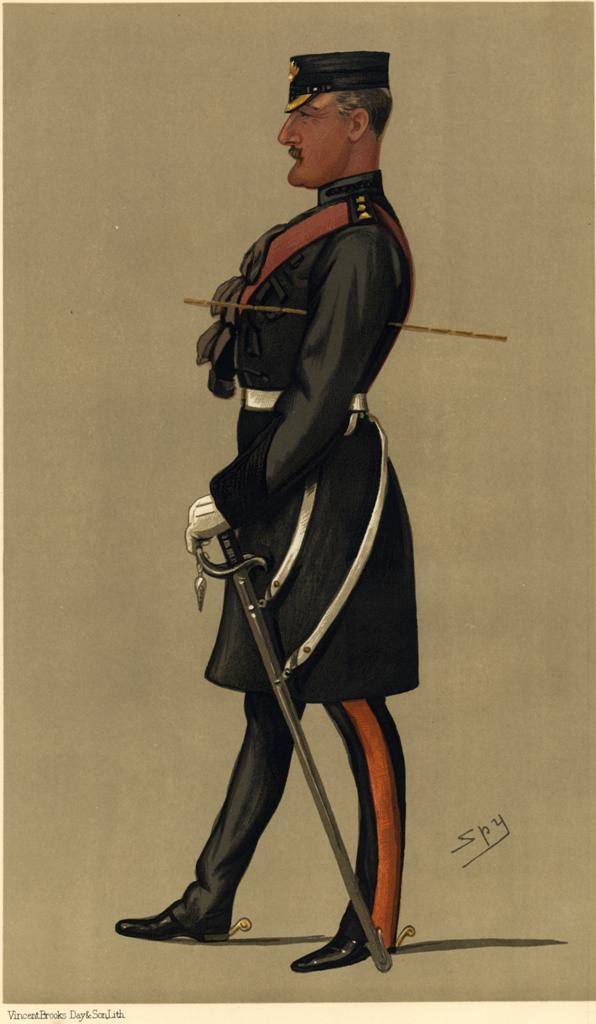
As depicted by "Spy" (Leslie Ward) in Vanity Fair, October 1891

At the age of twenty Eaton joined the Grenadier Guards, and went to Dublin, where he was given the nickname "Brown" by his brother officers. He rowed for the 1st Battalion Grenadier Guards in the 1877 Grand Challenge Cup at Henley Royal Regatta. His father became Baron Cheylesmore of Cheylesmore, in the city of Coventry, co. Warwick in 1887 and had to give up his parliamentary seat. In the ensuing by-election Eaton stood for the seat but failed to be elected by 16 votes. He first appeared in Vanity Fair in 1891 as commander of the 2nd Battalion, Grenadier Guards, which he had "just brought back from a well-deserved, if enforced, holiday in Bermuda. As some curious punishment, the entire battalion had been sent there for a year following 'an act of insubordination.'" While there in 1891, he met Elizabeth Richardson French, daughter of Francis Ormond French of New York and sister of Amos Tuck French, and married her back in London on 14 July 1892. Vanity Fair said of him in 1891

"He is a good all-round sportsman who drives his father’s team well; but though a fair shot, he is sometimes a little too eager to get birds. He has thrown himself heart and soul into most things connected with the Brigade; and the Boat Club and Racing Club would miss him as much as he would be missed from an Ascot luncheon. He has commanded the N.R.A. camp at Wimbledon and Bisley for seven years; yet withal he has found time to start and successfully edit The Brigade of Guards Magazine. He is a very good and very popular Colonel."

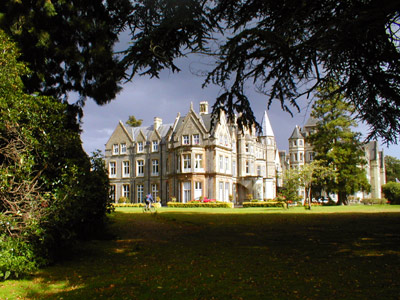
Coopers Hill, Runnymede

He became Major-General in 1899, and was appointed a Knight of Grace of the Order of St. John (KStJ) in July 1901.

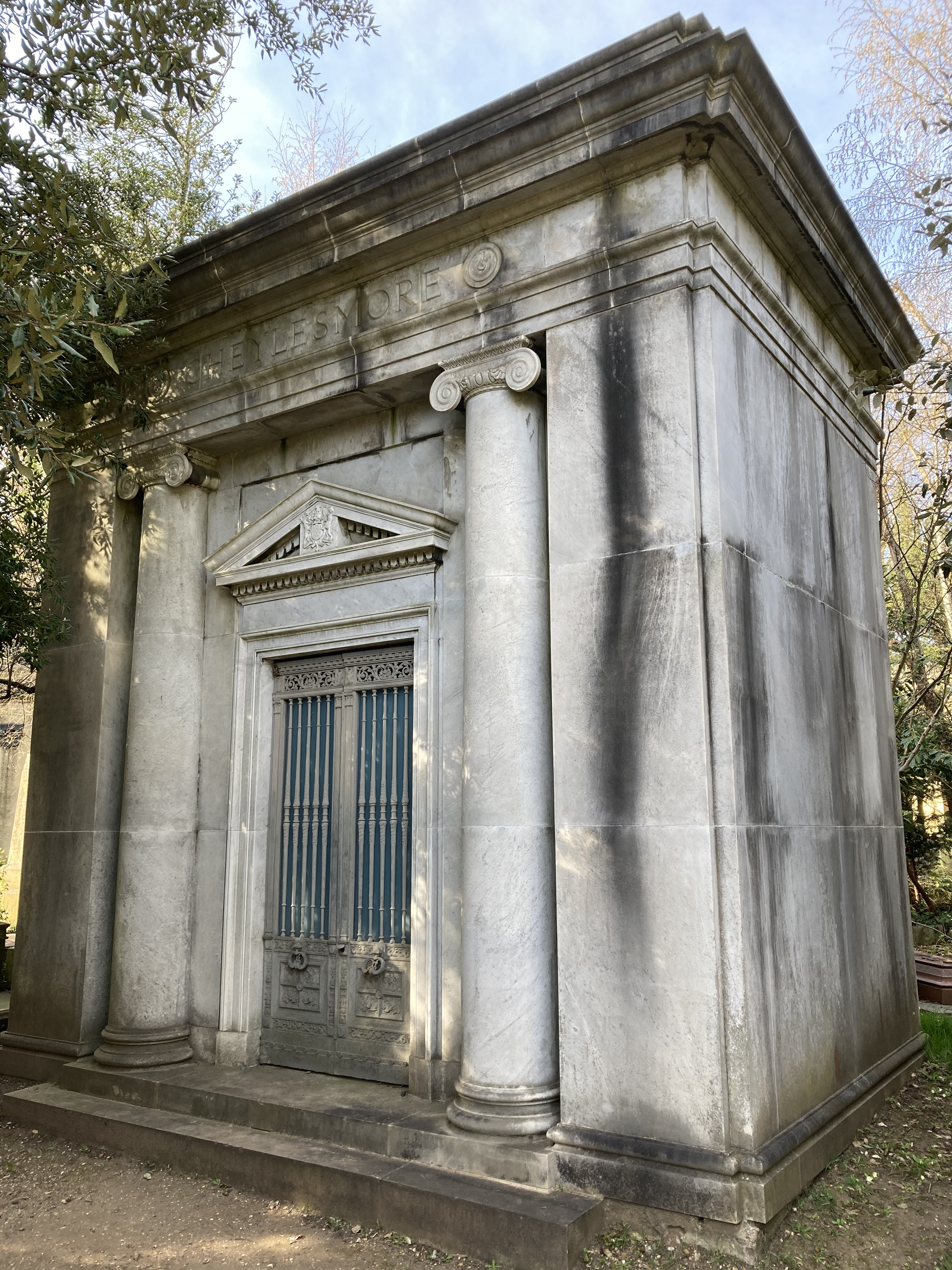
Cheylesmore mausoleum in Highgate Cemetery

== Political career ==
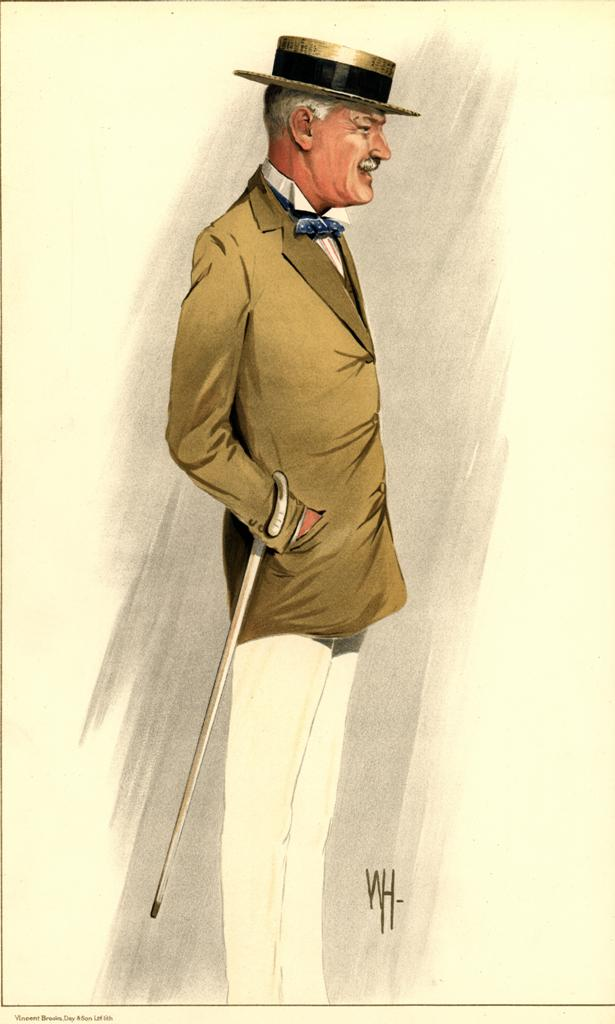
As depicted by Wallace Hester in Vanity Fair, July 1912

On the death of his brother on 10 July 1902, Eaton succeeded to the title of 3rd Baron Cheylesmore, and he took the oath and made his maiden speech in the House of Lords in November that year. He shot for the House of Lords against the Commons in the annual marksmanship competition from 1906.

Cheylesmore was an alderman of Westminster City Council, and Mayor of Westminster for 1905–06. In December 1907, he was appointed a deputy lieutenant of Middlesex.

On 17 January 1911, Baroness Cheylesmore purchased the Cooper's Hill property at Runnymede, previously used by the Royal Indian Engineering College, for use as a family home.

In April 1912, Cheylesmore became Chairman of London County Council. In this capacity, he opened the Woolwich foot tunnel on Saturday, 26 October 1912.

== First World War and after ==
At the outbreak of the First World War, Cheylesmore became commandant of a School of Musketry at Bisley Camp, where the ranges were put at the disposal of the Army Council. The school was to train and provide instructors in musketry from those who had passed the age of military service. The School trained some 14,500 officers, NCOs and civilians for service in the Army and Territorial Force.

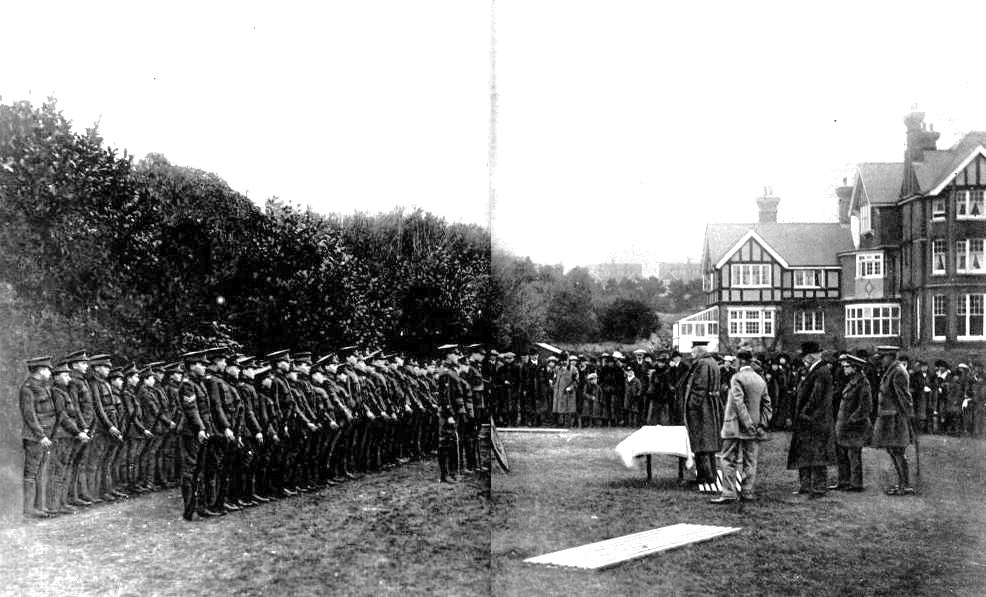
General Cheylesmore, as Chairman of the NRA addresses St Cyprian's School Cadet Corps after they won the Imperial Challenge Shield in 1917

Of Cheylesmore it was said "He is never happier than when the boys have their week at Bisley, and he can devote a portion of his well-earned holidays to teaching the young idea to shoot. Loves rifle shooting as much as marksmen like him – which is indeed saying a very great deal. Has done more to advance the "nation of marksmen" ideal than any other nobleman in the country".

During World War I he presided over several courts-martial including that which condemned the spy Carl Hans Lody to death and that of Captain Bowen-Colthurst for the murders of Thomas Dickson, Patrick McIntyre and Francis Sheehy-Skeffington.

Cheylesmore was honoured Knight Grand Cross of the Order of the British Empire (GBE) in the 1925 Birthday Honours. He died a month later aged 77, in a motor accident, the first peer to suffer such a fate in Britain. He was buried in Highgate Cemetery in a Grade II listed mausoleum designed by the American firm of architects, Carrère and Hastings. The family was desolated and the great ballroom, known as the Pillar Hall at Coopers Hill, which was being built for the coming of age of their heir, was left unfinished. He is commemorated by a monument by Sir Edwin Lutyens in Victoria Embankment Gardens, London. The Cheylesmore Range at Bisley named after him was opened for the 1948 Summer Olympics.

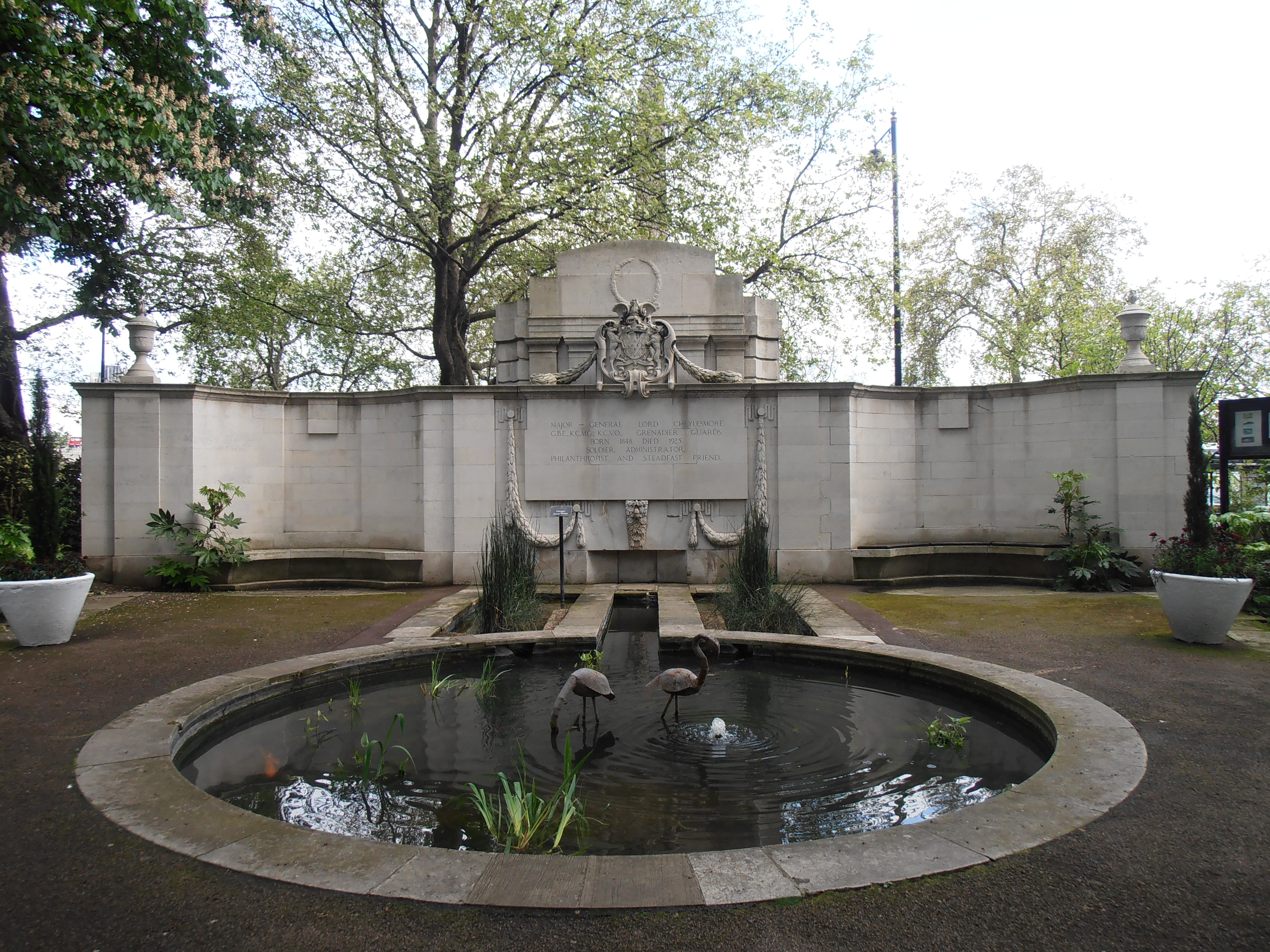
The Cheylesmore Memorial by Sir Edwin Lutyens, Victoria Embankment Gardens, London

His son Francis Ormond Henry Eaton, 4th Baron Cheylesmore succeeded to the Barony; on the fourth Baron's death in 1985, the Barony became extinct.

Peerage of the United Kingdom
Preceded by William Eaton	Baron Cheylesmore; 1902–1925	Succeeded by Francis Eaton
Political offices
Preceded by George Swinton	Chairman of the London County Council; 1912–1913	Succeeded by Cyril Cobb
