= John William Dennis =

British politician

John William Dennis (16 May 1865 – 4 August 1949) was a British politician. He was Mayor of Westminster in 1907–08, when he was described as Liberal Unionist. He was a Conservative Party Member of Parliament (MP) from 1918 to 1922 for the newly created constituency of Birmingham Deritend.

He was elected in the 1918 general election but only served for a single term being replaced by fellow Conservative Smedley Crooke at 1922 General Election.

Parliament of the United Kingdom
Preceded by New Seat	Member of Parliament for Birmingham Deritend; 1918 – 1922	Succeeded by Smedley Crooke
