= Francis Eaton, 4th Baron Cheylesmore =

Francis Ormond Henry Eaton, 4th Baron Cheylesmore, DSO (19 June 1893 – 21 April 1985), succeeded to the Barony of Cheylesmore on the death of his father Herbert Eaton, 3rd Baron Cheylesmore in July 1925.

The fourth Baron married firstly Leonora (Nora) Mary Parker, the daughter of a gentleman sheep farmer Erskine James Rainy Parker and Florence Agnes Parker (née Leary) of Parknook Estate, Longford, Tasmania. The couple separated and after a highly publicised Court trial, divorced on 27 February 1927, allegedly on the grounds that Lady Cheylesmore could not produce an heir for the Barony. According to Australian society pages from the day, the Dowager Baroness, Elizabeth also did not approve the match and created numerous issues for the couple. Nora, Lady Cheylesmore continued to live in London following the separation at the Savoy Hotel.

Lord Cheylesmore moved to Canada and married a Miss Pearl Margaret Sundberg, daughter of A J Sundberg in July 1929. The new Lady Cheylesmore was a Canadian nurse, and was also unable to provide Lord Cheylesmore with an heir. Given that there was no heir to the title upon the death of the fourth Baron in 1985 the Barony became extinct.

== Notes ==
- (Year of death: See previous entry in Wikipedia, Baron Cheylesmore, etc.)
- (Second marriage: See Debrett's Illustrated Peerage, Pg. 260, publication unknown; Pearl Margaret Sundberg, daughter of the late A.J. Sundberg of Alix, Alberta.)

Peerage of the United Kingdom
| Preceded by Herbert Eaton | Baron Cheylesmore; 1925–1985 | Extinct |
