= Denis Howell =

British politician (1923-1998)

The Right Honourable The Lord Howell PC

Minister for Sport
- In office 4 March 1974 – 4 May 1979
- Prime Minister: Harold Wilson; James Callaghan
- Preceded by: Eldon Griffiths
- Succeeded by: Hector Monro
- In office 16 October 1964 – 19 June 1970
- Prime Minister: Harold Wilson
- Preceded by: Position established
- Succeeded by: Eldon Griffiths

Minister for Floods
- In office 23 August 1976 – 3 May 1979
- Prime Minister: James Callaghan
- Preceded by: Position established
- Succeeded by: Position abolished

Member of Parliament for Birmingham Small Heath
- In office 23 March 1961 – 16 March 1992
- Preceded by: William Wheeldon
- Succeeded by: Roger Godsiff

Member of Parliament for Birmingham All Saints
- In office 26 May 1955 – 18 September 1959
- Preceded by: Constituency established
- Succeeded by: John Hollingworth

Personal details
- Born: Denis Herbert Howell; 4 September 1923 Birmingham, England
- Died: 19 April 1998 (aged 74) Solihull, England
- Party: Labour
- Spouse: Brenda Marjorie Willson
- Children: 4

Denis Herbert Howell, Baron Howell PC (4 September 1923 – 19 April 1998) was a British Labour Party politician. He was a councillor on Birmingham City Council between 1946 and 1956. He was the Member of Parliament for Birmingham All Saints from 1955 to 1959, and MP for Birmingham Small Heath from 1961 to 1992. In 1992, he was made a life peer and became a Member of the House of Lords.

== Early life ==
Denis Howell was born in Lozells, Birmingham, on 4 September 1923, the son of a gasfitter and storekeeper. He was educated at Gower Street School and Handsworth Grammar School, Birmingham, and became a clerk of the Clerical and Administrative Workers Union, rising to the position of President of its expanded successor, the Association of Professional, Executive, Clerical and Computer Staff (APEX) from 1971 to 1989.

In 1951 he graduated as a linesman in the Football League, and was a Football Association referee from 1956 until 1966. In addition to being a lifelong Aston Villa fan, he was a keen cricketer.

== Political career ==
Howell claimed that his first memory was of sitting on his father's knee at a general strike meeting in 1926. He joined the Labour Party in 1942, serving as a councillor on Birmingham City Council 1946–56 and as Labour Group secretary from 1950.

He contested Birmingham King's Norton in 1951. He was Member of Parliament (MP) for Birmingham All Saints from 1955 to 1959, and for Birmingham Small Heath from the 1961 by-election until his retirement in 1992. Under the Wilson and Callaghan governments, he held the role of Minister for Sport at the Department of Education and Science (1964–1969), Ministry of Housing and Local Government (1969–1970) and Department for the Environment (1974–1979), as well as a series of Environment roles (1976–1979).

On 28 October 1974, his wife and son escaped unharmed when an IRA bomb exploded in their Ford Cortina on the driveway of the family home in Birmingham.

In the last week of August 1976, during Britain's driest summer in over 200 years, he was made Minister for Drought (but nicknamed 'Minister for Rain'). Howell was charged by the Prime Minister with the task of persuading the nation to use less water, and was even ordered by No.10 to do a rain dance on behalf of the nation. Howell responded by inviting reporters to his home in Moseley in Birmingham, where he revealed he was doing his bit to help water rationing by sharing baths with his wife, Brenda. Days later, heavy rainfall caused widespread flooding, and he became known as "Minister for Floods". Then, during the harsh winter of 1978–1979 he was appointed Minister for Snow.

Along with Shirley Williams, he caused controversy in 1977 by appearing on the picket line during the Grunwick dispute in North London, the scene of violent trade union protests about factory working conditions.

== Later life ==
He published his memoirs, Made in Birmingham, in 1990, and on 1 July 1992 he was made a life peer as Baron Howell, of Aston Manor in the City of Birmingham.

Howell underwent major heart surgery in 1989, but recovered sufficiently to pursue an active political career and often made his point known in the House of Lords. He died in Solihull Hospital, after suffering a heart attack at a charity fund-raising dinner at the National Motorcycle Museum in Bickenhill, West Midlands, on 19 April 1998, aged 74.

== Legacy ==
The CRUK Institute for Cancer Studies at the University of Birmingham is named after Howell.

== Family ==
His son, Andrew Howell, was elected to Birmingham City Council for Moseley and Kings Heath Ward serving as Chair of the Education Committee and as Deputy Leader. Another son, Michael, worked as a procurement manager for Highways England. His youngest son, David, was killed in a car accident on 22 May 1986 in what he described in his memoirs as the "most devastating day" in his family's lives. His Daughter Kate Howell worked in education in Birmingham.

== Sources ==
- The Times Guide to the House of Commons, Times Newspapers Ltd, 1951, 1966 & 1987
- Obituary in The Daily Telegraph
- Leigh Rayment's Peerage Pages
- Leigh Rayment's Historical List of MPs

Parliament of the United Kingdom
New constituency	Member of Parliament for Birmingham All Saints; 1955 – 1959	Succeeded by John Hollingworth
Preceded by William Wheeldon	Member of Parliament for Birmingham Small Heath; 1961 – 1992	Succeeded by Roger Godsiff
Political offices
New office	Minister for Sport; 1964–1970	Succeeded by Eldon Griffiths
Preceded by Eldon Griffiths	Minister for Sport; 1974–1979	Succeeded by Hector Monro
Trade union offices
Preceded by David Currie	President of the Association of Professional, Executive, Clerical and Computer Staff; 1972–1983	Succeeded by Ken Smith
