= St Martins and Deritend (ward) =

Ward in County Borough, Birmingham before 1949

St Martins and Deritend was a ward of the County Borough of Birmingham. It was abolished in 1949.

== Ward Description ==
The ward covered an area of south central Birmingham, including the districts of Deritend and Bordesley.

== Ward History ==
The ward was created in {}, with the boundaries being unaltered between 1934 and 1949.

== Parliamentary Representation ==
The ward has been part of Birmingham {} constituency.

== Politics ==
The ward was generally a Socialist ward, although it was won by the Tories in the immediate pre-war era.

== Election results ==
=== 1940’s ===
12 May 1949 Electorate 14,161 Turnout 45.1%,
Party	Candidate	Votes	%	±%
Labour	L Chaffey	3,281	51.4%	
Conservative	H Harvey	3,105	48.6%	
Majority		176	2.8%	
Labour hold		Swing		

1 November 1947 Electorate 14,162 Turnout 42.7%,
Party	Candidate	Votes	%	±%
Labour	E Horton	3,027	50.0%	
Conservative	G Baragwanath	3,021	50.0%	
Majority		6	0.0%	
Labour hold		Swing		

2 November 1946 Electorate 13,509 Turnout 31.6%,
Party	Candidate	Votes	%	±%
Labour	T Paton	2,686	62.9%	
Conservative	A Brooks	1,581	37.1%	
Majority		1,105	25.8%	
Labour hold		Swing		

3 November 1945 Electorate 12,760 Turnout 32.1%,
Party	Candidate	Votes	%	±%
Labour	James Tonks	2,699	66.0%	
Conservative	Edgar Keely	1,392	34.0%	
Majority		1,307	32.0%	
Labour hold		Swing		
