= Charles Norton (solicitor) =

Sir Walter Charles Norton MBE MC (24 May 1896 – 22 October 1974) was an English solicitor.

He was managing partner of Norton Rose Fulbright, chairman of The Hurlingham Club, president of The Law Society in 1955–56 and Conservative Mayor of the City of Westminster for 1957–58. He was knighted in 1956. Norton represented Grosvenor Ward as a councillor on the Metropolitan Borough of Westminster from 1948 to 1962, when he was elevated to Alderman. He continued to serve in this position on the newly established Westminster City Council, which replaced the former borough, until 1971.
