= Roy Hattersley =

British politician, author and journalist (1932–2026)

The Right Honourable The Lord Hattersley PC FRSL
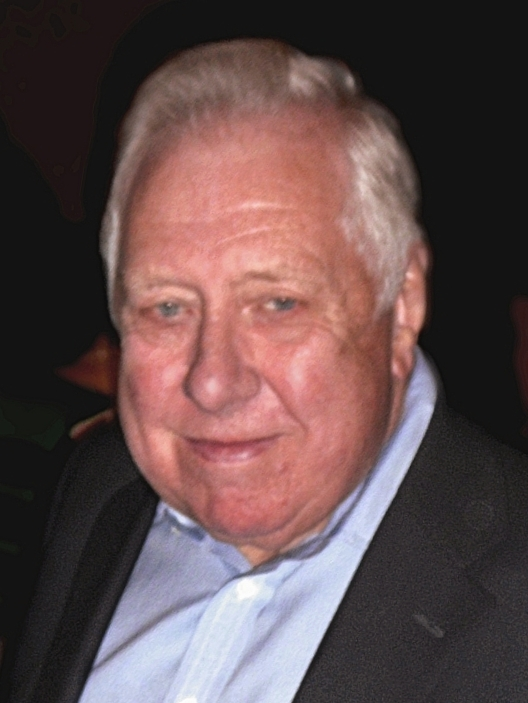
- Hattersley in 2012

Deputy Leader of the Labour Party
- In office 2 October 1983 – 18 July 1992
- Leader: Neil Kinnock
- Preceded by: Denis Healey
- Succeeded by: Margaret Beckett
Shadow cabinet posts 1979–1992
Shadow Secretary of State
1979–1980	Environment
1980–1983	Home Department
1983–1987	Chancellor of the Exchequer
1987–1992	Home Department

Secretary of State for Prices and Consumer Protection
- In office 10 September 1976 – 4 May 1979
- Prime Minister: James Callaghan
- Preceded by: Shirley Williams
- Succeeded by: Office abolished
Junior ministerial posts 1974–1976
Minister of State
1974–1976	Foreign and Commonwealth Affairs
Shadow cabinet posts 1972–1974
Shadow Secretary of State
1973–1974	Education and Science
Shadow Spokesperson
1972–1974	Trade and Industry
Junior ministerial posts 1967–1970
Minister of State
1969–1970	Defence Administration
Parliamentary Under-Secretary
1968–1969	Employment and Productivity
Parliamentary Secretary
1967–1968	Ministry of Labour

Member of the House of Lords
- Lord Temporal
- Life peerage 24 November 1997 – 19 May 2017

Member of Parliament for Birmingham Sparkbrook
- In office 15 October 1964 – 8 April 1997
- Preceded by: Leslie Seymour
- Succeeded by: Constituency abolished

Personal details
- Born: Roy Sydney George Hattersley; 28 December 1932 Sheffield, England
- Died: 13 June 2026 (aged 93) Derbyshire, England
- Party: Labour
- Spouses: Molly Hattersley (m. 1956; div. 2013) Maggie Pearlstine (m. 2013)
- Relations: Norman Pearlstine (brother-in-law)
- Parent: Enid Hattersley (mother)
- Education: University of Hull

Roy Sydney George Hattersley, Baron Hattersley (28 December 1932 – 13 June 2026) was a British politician, author and journalist who served in the House of Commons of the United Kingdom for Birmingham Sparkbrook from 1964 to 1997, and in the House of Lords from 1997 to 2017. A member of the Labour Party, he held multiple ministerial positions under Harold Wilson and James Callaghan. In opposition, Hattersley was deputy leader of the Labour Party under Neil Kinnock from 1983 to 1992.

Born in Sheffield, Hattersley was introduced to politics by his mother Enid Hattersley, who served on the Sheffield City Council. At age 23 he was elected to the council. After a failed candidacy in 1959, Hattersley was elected to parliament in the 1964 election.

Hattersley was aligned with Gaitskellism. As Minister of State in the Ministry of Defence Hattersley oversaw the deployment of soldiers to Northern Ireland as part of Operation Banner. Although Hattersley opposed Michael Foot during the 1980 leadership contest he remained with Labour rather than joining the Social Democratic Party.

Hattersley lost the 1983 leadership contest to Kinnock and was made deputy leader. Both men resigned from leadership after Labour's defeat in 1992. After leaving parliament in 1997, Hattersley was critical of Labour under Tony Blair and Jeremy Corbyn.

== Early life and education ==
Roy Sydney George Hattersley was born in Sheffield on 28 December 1932, to Frederick Roy Hattersley and Enid Anne O'Hara (née Brackenbury). Frederick was commonly known by his middle name, while his younger brothers William and Charles were known as George and Syd respectively.

Hattersley's parents met in Shirebrook, Derbyshire, where Frederick was a Catholic parish priest. He eloped with Enid two weeks after officiating at her wedding. They eventually married in 1956, after the death of Enid's first husband (the Wilson government, of which Roy was a member, would later pass legislation allowing children born out of wedlock to re-register their births when their parents married). Frederick was excommunicated for his behaviour and died an atheist. Roy remained unaware of his father's background until after the latter's death, when he received a letter of condolence from Edward Ellis, the Catholic Bishop of Nottingham.

Enid was the daughter of a coal merchant and formally joined the Labour Party at age 14. She and Frederick both served on Sheffield City Council, and Enid became Lord Mayor in 1981. Enid introduced her son to politics when he was 12, taking him with her as she campaigned for Labour during the 1945 general election. He joined the Labour Party at age 16. Hattersley stated that A. V. Alexander, his local MP, was his hero, and identified the book Equality by R. H. Tawney (which he was assigned as summer reading by a schoolmaster) as a formative influence.

Roy contracted diphtheria in December 1937, and suffered from respiratory issues for years before being diagnosed with asthma. He attended Wisewood Primary School, Hillsborough High School, Sheffield City Grammar School and the University of Hull.

== Local politics ==
Hattersley served as president of the National Association of Labour Students in 1954.

Hattersley was elected to Sheffield Council at age 23; he was the youngest member of the council. Park Hill was commissioned by Hattersley in his role as chair of the housing management committee.

== Member of Parliament ==
In the 1959 general election Hattersley unsuccessfully stood as a Labour candidate in Sutton Coldfield. In the 1964 general election Hattersley was elected as MP for Birmingham Sparkbrook, and represented that constituency for the next 33 years. He was the youngest MP elected in 1964.

In 1994, Hattersley announced that he was retiring from politics. He left the House of Commons in 1997, and was made a life peer in the House of Lords, as Baron Hattersley of Sparkbrook. He retired from the House of Lords in 2017.

=== Party politics ===
Upon entering parliament Hattersley was aligned with Gaitskellism and Roy Jenkins.

In 1969, Hattersley attempted to convince Jenkins to withdraw his support for Barbara Castle and Harold Wilson and run for leadership, but Jenkins declined to do so.

Wilson stepped down as leader of Labour in 1976. The candidates in the leadership contest included Hattersley's ally Jenkins, his mentor Anthony Crosland, and his ministerial superior James Callaghan. Hattersley supported Callaghan during the contest. He told Jenkins and Crosland that Callaghan was the only person who could hold Labour together, but was told to "fuck off" by Crosland.

Callaghan stepped down as leader in 1980. Hattersley was a major figure in Denis Healey's campaign in the leadership contest, which was ultimately won by Michael Foot. Hattersley refused to join the Gang of Four in splitting from Labour in 1981.

On 17 February 1981, the Labour Solidarity Campaign was formed with Hattersley as chair and 102 MPs supported the organisation. The organisation sought to expand the influence of moderates in Labour and to reverse the Wembley Conference, which created an electoral college to elect Labour's leader.

Michael Foot stepped down as leader after Labour's poor performance in the 1983 general election. Hattersley ran in the leadership contest, but lost to Neil Kinnock. Many of the unions associated with the Labour Solidarity Campaign supported Kinnock and the Electrical, Electronic, Telecommunications and Plumbing Union boycotted the election as it favoured individual voting rather than block voting. Hattersley defeated Michael Meacher to become deputy leader.

The expulsion of the Militant tendency from Labour was supported by Hattersley.

Hattersley wrote Labour's Choice in 1983 (updated to Choose Freedom in 1987), espousing an updated form of democratic socialism. Kinnock proposed using Hattersley's writing as a basis for a new Labour statement of aims and values in 1988, but it was rejected.

After Labour's defeat in the 1992 general election both Kinnock and Hattersley resigned from leadership. Margaret Beckett replaced Hattersley as deputy leader. Hattersley would occasionally be asked to go on the topical panel programme Have I Got News For You but often pulled out, which led to the programme once replacing him with a tub of lard.

Hattersley was critical of Tony Blair during his time as prime minister, believing that Labour under Blair abandoned blue-collar workers. He believed that Labour was not acting against antisemitism in the party and opposed Jeremy Corbyn's support for Palestine. He threatened to leave Labour in 2019, and criticised MPs who opposed Corbyn for failing to present a different vision for Labour than him.

=== Ministerial positions ===
Hattersley was the youngest member of Wilson and Callaghan's cabinets.

Hattersley was Minister of State in the Ministry of Defence from 1969 to 1970. In this role he oversaw the launch of Operation Banner, in which the United Kingdom deployed troops to Northern Ireland. Healey, the Defence Secretary, was unable to launch the operation as he was hospitalised at the time.

Prime Minister Edward Heath negotiated the United Kingdom's entry into the European Economic Community (EEC) in 1971. Labour was split on the issue of EEC membership, with Hattersley being one of those in favour. Jenkins resigned from Labour's shadow cabinet in protest of the party's support for a exit referendum, but Hattersley chose to remain. George Thomson, the defence spokesman, also resigned with Jenkins and was replaced by Hattersley.

Hattersley was education spokesman in the shadow cabinet from 1972 to 1974. Hattersley, who supported phasing out private schools, was not retained in the cabinet after the February 1974 general election. He was made deputy to Foreign Secretary James Callaghan. From 1979 to 1980, he was Shadow Secretary of State for Education in the shadow cabinet.

Foot made Hattersley, who chose to remain loyal to Labour rather than join the Social Democratic Party, Home Secretary in his shadow cabinet, a position that he held from 1980 to 1983. In Kinnock's shadow cabinet he was Chancellor of the Exchequer from 1983 to 1987, and Home Secretary from 1987 to 1992.

Relations between the government and unions broke down between 1974 and 1979. Hattersley attempted to restrict pay increases to below 6%. He blamed the Winter of Discontent and unions for Labour's defeat in the 1979 general election. However, he stated that the path towards Margaret Thatcher was paved by Callaghan's government accepting a bailout from the International Monetary Fund in 1976, and its failure to defend public spending.

Hattersley wanted to be Secretary of State for Education and was offered the position in John Smith's cabinet. However, Hattersley declined the offer and he felt that this was a temporary position and that he would be replaced once Smith became prime minister.

== Writing ==
In Hattersley's youth his favourite authors were Richmal Crompton and W. E. Johns.

Hattersley published over 20 books. His columns were published by The Spectator, The Listener, The Guardian, and Daily Mail. He was a contributor to the New Statesman. In 1988, he signed a £150,000 contract for an autobiography and two novels.

== Personal life ==
Hattersley attended Wadsley Parish Church in his youth.

Hattersley met his first wife Molly at the University of Hull. They married in 1956, and had no children. The couple separated in 2008, and divorced in 2013. Hattersley married Maggie Pearlstine in 2013. On 13 June 2026, he died at his home in Derbyshire, England.

Norman Pearlstine was Hattersley's brother-in-law. Hattersley's maternal grandfather Ernest Brackenbury was chair of the Derbyshire County Council.

== Bibliography ==
- The Catholics: The Church and its People in Britain and Ireland, from the Reformation to the Present Day (2017) ISBN 978-1-784-74158-7
- The Devonshires: The Story of a Family and a Nation (2013) ISBN 978-0-099-55439-4
- David Lloyd George: The Great Outsider (2010) ISBN 978-1-4087-0097-6
- In Search Of England, Hachette (2009) ISBN 978-1-408-70096-9
- Borrowed Time: The Story of Britain Between the Wars (2007) ISBN 978-031-673032-7
- Buster's Secret Diaries (2007) ISBN 978-0-297-85216-2
- Campbell-Bannerman (2006) ISBN 978-1-9049-5056-1
- The Edwardians: Biography of the Edwardian Age (2004) ISBN 0-316-72537-4
- A Brand from the Burning: The Life of John Wesley (2002) ISBN 978-0-316-86020-8
- Blood and Fire: William and Catherine Booth and the Salvation Army (1999) ISBN 0-316-85161-2
- Buster's Diaries (1998) ISBN 978-0-316-64592-8
- 50 Years on: Prejudiced History of Britain Since the War (1997) ISBN 0-316-87932-0
- No Discouragement: An Autobiography (1996) ISBN 0-333-64957-5
- Who Goes Home?: Scenes from a Political Life (1995) ISBN 0-316-87669-0
- Between Ourselves (1994) ISBN 0-330-32574-4
- Skylark's Song (1993) ISBN 0-333-55608-9
- In That Quiet Earth (1993) ISBN 0-330-32303-2
- The Maker's Mark (1990) ISBN 0-333-47032-X
- Choose Freedom: The Future for Democratic Socialism (1987) ISBN 0-14-010494-1
- A Yorkshire Boyhood (1983) ISBN 0-7011-2613-2
- with Eric Heffer, Neil Kinnock and Peter Shore Labour's Choices (1983) ISBN 978-0-716-30489-0
- Press Gang (1983) ISBN 0-86051-205-3
- Goodbye to Yorkshire (1976) ISBN 0-575-02201-9

== Works cited ==
=== Books ===
- Hattersley, Roy (2001). A Yorkshire Boyhood. Little, Brown and Company. ISBN 0316853836.
- Hayter, Dianne (2005). Fightback! Labour's traditional right in the 1970s and 1980s. Manchester University Press. ISBN 9781526185792.
- Hennessy, Peter; Shepherd, Robert (2016). Reflections: Conversations with Politicians. Haus Publishing. ISBN 9781910376485.

=== News ===
- "Enid Hattersley". The Herald. 22 May 2001. Archived from the original on 31 December 2025.
- "Enid Hattersley". The Daily Telegraph. 22 May 2001. Archived from the original on 6 January 2016.
- "Profile: So farewell, socialist about town: Roy Hattersley, Labour's Yorkshire pudding, bows out". The Independent. 26 February 1994. Archived from the original on 17 June 2026.
- Basini, Mario (14 June 2002). "Agenda: Skeletons in the family cupboard; Labour grandee tells of his parents' big secret". Western Mail. Archived from the original on 3 February 2017.
- Cowell, Alan (16 June 2026). "Roy Hattersley, Frontline Warrior of British Politics, Dies at 93". The New York Times.
- Davies, Maia (14 June 2026). "Roy Hattersley, former Labour deputy leader, dies aged 93". BBC. Archived from the original on 17 June 2026.
- Hattersley, Roy (14 May 2007). "Ian Paisley and me". The Guardian. Archived from the original on 17 June 2026.
- Mendick, Robert; Pepinster, Catherine (4 March 2017). "Lord Hattersley: How my married mother ran off with the priest two weeks after he officiated at her wedding". The Daily Telegraph. Archived from the original on 8 January 2026.
- Perkins, Anne (14 June 2026). "Lord Hattersley obituary". The Guardian. Archived from the original on 15 June 2026.
- Pitel, Laura (13 April 2013). "Hattersley joins 'silver splitters' as he divorces wife of 57 years". The Times. Archived from the original on 12 September 2025.

=== Web ===
- "Representative Larry Walker (D-SH 115)". Parliament of the United Kingdom. Archived from the original on 17 June 2026.

Parliament of the United Kingdom
Preceded by Leslie Seymour	Member of Parliament for Birmingham Sparkbrook; 1964–1997	Constituency abolished
Political offices
Preceded by Shirley Williams	Secretary of State for Prices and Consumer Protection; 1976–1979	Position abolished
Preceded by Merlyn Rees	Shadow Home Secretary; 1980–1983	Succeeded by Gerald Kaufman
Preceded by Peter Shore	Shadow Chancellor of the Exchequer; 1983–1987	Succeeded by John Smith
Preceded by Gerald Kaufman	Shadow Home Secretary; 1987–1992	Succeeded by Tony Blair
Party political offices
Preceded by Denis Healey	Deputy Leader of the Labour Party; 1983–1992	Succeeded by Margaret Beckett
Honorary titles
Preceded by The Lord Morris of Aberavon	Senior Privy Counsellor; 2023–2026	Succeeded by The Lord Rodgers of Quarry Bank
