= Birmingham Sparkbrook =

Parliamentary constituency in the United Kingdom, 1918–1997

- Former borough constituency for the House of Commons
- County: West Midlands

1918–1997
- Seats: One
- Created from: Birmingham East
- Replaced by: Birmingham Sparkbrook & Small Heath

Birmingham, Sparkbrook was a parliamentary constituency centred on the Sparkbrook area of Birmingham. It returned one Member of Parliament (MP) to the House of Commons of the Parliament of the United Kingdom, elected by the first past the post system.

The constituency was created for the 1918 general election, and abolished for the 1997 general election, when it was partly replaced by the new Birmingham Sparkbrook and Small Heath constituency.

== History ==
In 1971, 18.9% were non-White. In 1981, 36% of the constituency were non-White. The constituency had the highest concentration of people born in Pakistan (8.3% of the population) in 1981.

It was a safe seat for the Conservative Party and affiliated candidates from its creation in 1918 until 1945, when Labour gained the seat for the first time in their landslide victory under Clement Attlee. Aside from a single Conservative victory in 1959, Labour held the seat with increasingly safe majorities with Roy Hattersley as its MP from 1964, until boundary changes merged Sparkbrook with nearby Small Heath in 1997.

== Boundaries ==
1918–1950: Parts of the County Borough of Birmingham wards of Balsall Heath, Moseley and King's Heath, and Sparkbrook.

1950–1955: The County Borough of Birmingham wards of Balsall Heath, St Martin's and Deritend, and Sparkbrook.

1955–1983: The County Borough of Birmingham wards of Fox Hollies, Sparkbrook, and Sparkhill.

1983–1997: The City of Birmingham wards of Fox Hollies, Sparkbrook, and Sparkhill.

== Members of Parliament ==
The constituency's most high-profile MP was Roy Hattersley, who represented it for over 30 years and was Deputy Leader of the Labour Party under Neil Kinnock from 1983 to 1992. He retired in 1997 when the seat was abolished, its replacement being won by Roger Godsiff.

Election	Member	Party
1918	Leo Amery	Coalition Conservative
1922	Leo Amery	Conservative
1945	Percy Shurmer	Labour
1959	Leslie Seymour	Conservative
1964	Roy Hattersley	Labour
1997	constituency abolished: see Birmingham Sparkbrook and Small Heath	

== Elections ==
=== Election in the 1910s ===
General election 1918: Birmingham Sparkbrook
Party		Candidate	Votes	%	±%
C	Unionist	Leo Amery	15,225	78.1	
	Co-operative Party	Frank Spires	3,014	15.5	
	Liberal	John Gibbard Hurst	1,251	6.4	
Majority			12,211	62.6	
Turnout			19,490	52.5	
Registered electors			37,123		
	Unionist win (new seat)				
C indicates candidate endorsed by the coalition government.

=== Elections in the 1920s ===
General election 1922: Birmingham Sparkbrook
Party	Candidate	Votes	%	±%
Unionist	Leo Amery	13,326	49.5	−28.6
Liberal	Thomas Foster Duggan	7,283	27.1	+20.7
Labour Co-op	Ernest Walter Hampton	6,310	23.4	New
Majority		6,043	22.4	−40.2
Turnout		26,919	71.0	+18.5
Registered electors		37,918		
Unionist hold		Swing	−24.7	

General election 1923: Birmingham Sparkbrook
Party	Candidate	Votes	%	±%
Unionist	Leo Amery	13,523	56.0	+6.5
Labour	Ernest Walter Hampton	5,948	24.6	+1.2
Liberal	Donald Finnemore	4,676	19.4	−7.7
Majority		7,575	31.4	+9.0
Turnout		24,147	63.7	−7.3
Registered electors		37,890		
Unionist hold		Swing	+2.7	

General election 1924: Birmingham Sparkbrook
Party	Candidate	Votes	%	±%
Unionist	Leo Amery	15,718	58.1	+2.1
Labour	S.B.M. Potter	9,759	36.1	+11.5
Liberal	Ernest Percy Ray	1,580	5.8	−13.6
Majority		5,959	22.0	−9.4
Turnout		27,057	71.1	+7.4
Registered electors		38,058		
Unionist hold		Swing	−4.7	

General election 1929: Birmingham Sparkbrook
Party	Candidate	Votes	%	±%
Unionist	Leo Amery	15,867	46.2	−11.9
Labour	A. Young	12,875	37.4	+1.3
Liberal	Thomas Foater Duggan	5,645	16.4	+10.6
Majority		2,992	8.8	−13.2
Turnout		34,387	73.1	+2.0
Registered electors		47,041		
Unionist hold		Swing	−6.6	

=== Elections in the 1930s ===
General election 1931: Birmingham Sparkbrook
Party	Candidate	Votes	%	±%
Conservative	Leo Amery	23,517	73.36	+27.16
Labour	George Archibald	8,538	26.64	−10.76
Majority		14,979	46.72	+37.92
Turnout		32,055	69.57	
Registered electors		46,073		
Conservative hold		Swing	+18.96	

General election 1935: Birmingham Sparkbrook
Party	Candidate	Votes	%	±%
Conservative	Leo Amery	17,509	68.47	−4.89
Labour	Henry Whittaker	8,063	31.53	+4.89
Majority		9,446	36.94	−9.78
Turnout		25,572	57.28	−12.29
Registered electors		44,647		
Conservative hold		Swing	−4.89	

=== Elections in the 1940s ===
General election 1945: Birmingham Sparkbrook
Party	Candidate	Votes	%	±%
Labour	Percy Shurmer	14,065	57.76	+26.23
Conservative	Leo Amery	8,431	34.63	−23.84
Communist	R. Palme Dutt	1,853	7.61	New
Majority		5,634	23.13	N/A
Turnout		24,349	66.68	+9.40
Registered electors		36,517		
Labour gain from Conservative		Swing	+25.04	

=== Elections in the 1950s ===
General election 1950: Birmingham Sparkbrook
Party	Candidate	Votes	%	±%
Labour	Percy Shurmer	24,942	61.49	+3.73
Conservative	Sir Piers Kenrick Debenham, 2nd Baronet	15,267	37.64	+3.01
Communist	James Crump	355	0.88	−6.73
Majority		9,675	23.85	+0.72
Turnout		40,564	77.58	+10.90
Registered electors		52,287		
Labour hold		Swing	+0.36	

General election 1951: Birmingham Sparkbrook
Party	Candidate	Votes	%	±%
Labour	Percy Shurmer	24,184	61.33	−0.16
Conservative	Richard Lonsdale	15,248	38.67	+1.03
Majority		8,936	22.66	−1.19
Turnout		39,423	76.41	−1.17
Registered electors		51,607		
Labour hold		Swing	−0.60	

General election 1955: Birmingham Sparkbrook
Party	Candidate	Votes	%	±%
Labour	Percy Shurmer	20,032	54.36	−8.97
Conservative	Philip G Hartley	16,821	45.64	+8.97
Majority		3,211	8.72	−13.94
Turnout		36,853	72.18	−4.23
Registered electors		51,057		
Labour hold		Swing	−8.97	

General election 1959: Birmingham Sparkbrook
Party	Candidate	Votes	%	±%
Conservative	Leslie Seymour	17,751	51.28	+5.64
Labour	John T Webster	16,865	48.72	−5.64
Majority		886	2.56	N/A
Turnout		34,616	72.52	+0.34
Registered electors		47,731		
Conservative gain from Labour		Swing	+5.64	

=== Elections in the 1960s ===
General election 1964: Birmingham Sparkbrook
Party	Candidate	Votes	%	±%
Labour	Roy Hattersley	16,287	52.00	+3.28
Conservative	Leslie Seymour	15,033	48.00	−3.28
Majority		1,254	4.00	N/A
Turnout		31,320	68.27	−4.25
Registered electors		45,877		
Labour gain from Conservative		Swing	+3.28	

General election 1966: Birmingham Sparkbrook
Party	Candidate	Votes	%	±%
Labour	Roy Hattersley	18,266	60.62	+8.62
Conservative	Leslie Seymour	11,868	39.38	−8.62
Majority		6,398	21.24	+17.24
Turnout		30,134	66.74	−1.53
Registered electors		45,148		
Labour hold		Swing	+8.62	

=== Elections in the 1970s ===
General election 1970: Birmingham Sparkbrook
Party	Candidate	Votes	%	±%
Labour	Roy Hattersley	14,773	52.74	−7.88
Conservative	Anthony EJ Mitton	11,427	40.79	+1.41
Liberal	John Crofton	1,813	6.47	New
Majority		3,346	11.95	−9.29
Turnout		28,013	64.89	−1.85
Registered electors		43,168		
Labour hold		Swing	−4.65	

General election February 1974: Birmingham Sparkbrook
Party	Candidate	Votes	%	±%
Labour	Roy Hattersley	19,939	61.40	+8.66
Conservative	David Jack Savage	12,534	38.60	−2.19
Majority		7,405	22.80	+10.85
Turnout		32,473	65.79	+0.9
Registered electors		49,344		
Labour hold		Swing	+5.43	

General election October 1974: Birmingham Sparkbrook
Party	Candidate	Votes	%	±%
Labour	Roy Hattersley	17,476	58.45	−2.95
Conservative	David Jack Savage	8,955	29.95	−8.65
Liberal	Cecil Edward Williams	2,920	9.77	New
Irish Civil Rights	Joseph Molloy	548	1.83	New
Majority		8,521	28.50	+5.70
Turnout		29,899	60.19	−5.60
Registered electors		49,683		
Labour hold		Swing	+2.85	

General election 1979: Birmingham Sparkbrook
Party	Candidate	Votes	%	±%
Labour	Roy Hattersley	18,717	62.75	+4.30
Conservative	Nicholas John David Webb	10,398	34.86	+4.91
Communist	Roger Murray	715	2.40	New
Majority		8,319	27.89	−0.61
Turnout		29,830	64.97	+4.78
Registered electors		45,910		
Labour hold		Swing	-0.31	

=== Elections in the 1980s ===
General election 1983: Birmingham Sparkbrook
Party	Candidate	Votes	%	±%
Labour	Roy Hattersley	19,757	59.9	−4.8
Conservative	Peter Douglas-Osborn	9,209	27.9	−5.0
SDP	Omkar Singh Parmar	3,416	10.4	New
Revolutionary Communist	Fran Eden	305	0.9	New
Independent	Carl Chinn	281	0.9	New
Majority		10,548	32.0	+0.2
Turnout		32,968	61.5	
Labour hold		Swing	+0.1	

General election 1987: Birmingham Sparkbrook
Party	Candidate	Votes	%	±%
Labour	Roy Hattersley	20,513	60.8	+0.9
Conservative	Nazir Khan	8,654	25.7	−2.2
SDP	Robin Dimmick	3,803	11.3	+0.9
Green	Rex Ambler	526	1.56	New
Red Front	Pervaiz Khan	229	0.7	New
Majority		11,859	35.2	+3.17
Turnout		33,725	63.52	+2.03
Labour hold		Swing	+1.6	

=== Elections in the 1990s ===
General election 1992: Birmingham Sparkbrook
Party	Candidate	Votes	%	±%
Labour	Roy Hattersley	22,116	64.1	+3.3
Conservative	Mohammed Khamisa	8,544	24.8	−0.9
Liberal Democrats	David Parry	3,028	8.8	−2.5
Green	Charles Alldrick	833	2.4	+0.8
Majority		13,572	39.3	+4.1
Turnout		34,521	66.8	+3.3
Labour hold		Swing	+2.1	
