= Parliamentary constituencies in the West Midlands (county) =

The ceremonial county of the West Midlands is divided into 27 parliamentary constituencies: 25 borough and 2 county constituencies, one of which crosses the boundary with Staffordshire.

== Constituencies ==
Conservative † Labour ‡ Reform UK ¤ Workers Party of Britain ♣ Independent ¥ Your

Constituency (Note: BC denotes borough constituency, CC denotes county constituency.)	Electorate	Majority (Note: The majority is the number of votes the winning candidate receives more than their nearest rival.)	Member of Parliament	Nearest opposition	Map
Aldridge-Brownhills BC	70,867	4,231	Wendy Morton †	Luke Davies ‡	
Birmingham Edgbaston BC	71,787	8,368	Preet Kaur Gill ‡	Ashvir Sangha †	
Birmingham Erdington BC	77,463	7,019	Paulette Hamilton ‡	Jack Brookes ¤	
Birmingham Hall Green and Moseley BC	76,936	5,656	Tahir Ali ‡	Shakeel Afsar ¥	
Birmingham Hodge Hill and Solihull North BC	77,737	1,566	Liam Byrne ‡	James Giles ♣	
Birmingham Ladywood BC	83,693	3,421	Shabana Mahmood ‡	Akhmed Yakoob ¥	
Birmingham Northfield BC	73,694	5,389	Laurence Turner ‡	Gary Sambrook †	
Birmingham Perry Barr BC	76,350	507	Ayoub Khan ¥	Khalid Mahmood ‡	
Birmingham Selly Oak BC	75,678	11,537	Alistair Carns ‡	Simon Phipps †	
Birmingham Yardley BC	73,203	693	Jess Phillips ‡	Jody McIntyre ♣	
Coventry East BC	75,801	11,623	Mary Creagh ‡	Iddrisu Sufyan ¤	
Coventry North West BC	75,057	11,174	Taiwo Owatemi ‡	Tom Mercer †	
Coventry South BC	76,262	10,201	Zarah Sultana (Note: Sultana resigned from the Labour Party in July 2025. She was named Your Party's first MP in November.)	Mattie Heaven †	
Dudley BC	70,151	1,900	Sonia Kumar †	Marco Longhi †	
Halesowen BC	68,549	4,364	Alex Ballinger ‡	James Morris †	
Kingswinford and South Staffordshire CC (Note: Cross-county constituency with Staffordshire.)	71,662	6,303	Mike Wood †	Sally Benton ‡	
Meriden and Solihull East CC	73,659	4,584	Saqib Bhatti †	Sarah Alan ‡	
Smethwick BC	72,863	11,188	Gurinder Josan ‡	Pete Durnell ¤	
Solihull West and Shirley BC	71,813	4,620	Neil Shastri-Hurst †	Deirdre Fox ‡	
Stourbridge BC	68,310	3,073	Cat Eccles ‡	Suzanne Webb †	
Sutton Coldfield BC	74,080	2,543	Andrew Mitchell †	Rob Pocock ‡	
Tipton and Wednesbury BC	74,100	3,385	Antonia Bance ‡	Shaun Bailey †	
Walsall and Bloxwich BC	74,951	4,914	Valerie Vaz ‡	Aftab Nawaz ¥	
West Bromwich BC	74,026	9,554	Sarah Coombes ‡	Will Goodhand †	
Wolverhampton North East BC	70,715	5,422	Sureena Brackenridge ‡	Jane Stevenson †	
Wolverhampton South East BC	77,473	9,188	Pat McFadden ‡	Carl Hardwick ¤	
Wolverhampton West BC	77,851	7,868	Warinder Juss ‡	Mike Newton †	

== Boundary changes ==
=== 2024 ===
See 2023 review of Westminster constituencies for further details.

Former name
1. Aldridge-Brownhills
2. Birmingham Edgbaston
3. Birmingham Erdington
4. Birmingham Hall Green
5. Birmingham Hodge Hill
6. Birmingham Ladywood
7. Birmingham Northfield
8. Birmingham Perry Barr
9. Birmingham Selly Oak
10. Birmingham Yardley
11. Coventry North East
12. Coventry North West
13. Coventry South
14. Dudley North
15. Dudley South
16. Halesowen and Rowley Regis
17. Meriden
18. Solihull
19. Stourbridge
20. Sutton Coldfield
21. Walsall North
22. Walsall South
23. Warley
24. West Bromwich East
25. West Bromwich West
26. Wolverhampton North East
27. Wolverhampton South East
28. Wolverhampton South West
Boundaries 2010-2024

Parliamentary constituencies in West Midlands (2010-2024)

Current name
1. Aldridge-Brownhills
2. Birmingham Edgbaston
3. Birmingham Erdington
4. Birmingham Hall Green and Moseley
5. Birmingham Hodge Hill and Solihull North
6. Birmingham Ladywood
7. Birmingham Northfield
8. Birmingham Perry Barr
9. Birmingham Selly Oak
10. Birmingham Yardley
11. Coventry East
12. Coventry North West
13. Coventry South
14. Dudley
15. Halesowen
16. Kingswinford and South Staffordshire
17. Meriden and Solihull East
18. Smethwick
19. Solihull West and Shirley
20. Stourbridge
21. Sutton Coldfield
22. Tipton and Wednesbury
23. Walsall and Bloxwich
24. West Bromwich
25. Wolverhampton North East
26. Wolverhampton South East
27. Wolverhampton West
Boundaries 2024–present

Parliamentary constituencies in West Midlands (2024-present)

For the 2023 review of Westminster constituencies, which redrew the constituency map ahead of the 2024 United Kingdom general election, the Boundary Commission for England opted to combine the West Midlands county with Staffordshire as a sub-region of the West Midlands Region, resulting in the creation of a new cross-county boundary constituency named Kingswinford and South Staffordshire, which includes part of the abolished constituency of Dudley South. As a consequence of knock-on changes and the need to reduce the overall number of seats in the Black Country portion of the West Midlands county by one, Dudley North, Halesowen and Rowley Regis, Wolverhampton South West, Warley, West Bromwich East, West Bromwich West, Walsall North and Walsall South were abolished and replaced by Dudley, Halesowen, Wolverhampton West, Smethwick, Tipton and Wednesbury, West Bromwich, and Walsall and Bloxwich.

Although the number of seats covering the cities of Birmingham and Coventry and the Borough of Solihull remained the same, there were a number of name changes due to revised boundaries:

- Birmingham Hall Green to Birmingham Hall Green and Moseley
- Birmingham Hodge Hill to Birmingham Hodge Hill and Solihull North
- Coventry North East to Coventry East
- Meriden to Meriden and Solihull East
- Solihull to Solihull West and Shirley

The following constituencies resulted from the boundary review:

Containing wards from Birmingham

- Birmingham Edgbaston
- Birmingham Erdington
- Birmingham Hall Green and Moseley
- Birmingham Hodge Hill and Solihull North (part)
- Birmingham Ladywood
- Birmingham Northfield
- Birmingham Perry Barr
- Birmingham Selly Oak
- Birmingham Yardley
- Sutton Coldfield

Containing wards from Coventry

- Coventry East
- Coventry North West
- Coventry South

Containing wards from Dudley

- Dudley
- Halesowen (part)
- Kingswinford and South Staffordshire (part also in South Staffordshire District)
- Stourbridge
- Tipton and Wednesbury (part)

Containing wards from Sandwell

- Halesowen (part)
- Smethwick
- Tipton and Wednesbury (part)
- West Bromwich

Containing wards from Solihull

- Birmingham Hodge Hill and Solihull North (part)
- Meriden and Solihull East
- Solihull West and Shirley

Containing wards from Walsall

- Aldridge-Brownhills
- Walsall and Bloxwich
- Wolverhampton North East (part)
- Wolverhampton South East (part)

Containing wards from Wolverhampton

- Wolverhampton North East (part)
- Wolverhampton South East (part)
- Wolverhampton West

=== 2010 ===
Under the fifth periodic review of Westminster constituencies, the Boundary Commission for England decided to reduce the number of seats in West Midlands from 29 to 28, resulting in the abolition of Birmingham Sparkbrook and Small Heath and leading to significant changes to other constituencies in the City of Birmingham.

Name (1997-2010)
1. Aldridge-Brownhills
2. Birmingham Edgbaston
3. Birmingham Erdington
4. Birmingham Hall Green
5. Birmingham Hodge Hill
6. Birmingham Ladywood
7. Birmingham Northfield
8. Birmingham Perry Barr
9. Birmingham Selly Oak
10. Birmingham Sparkbrook and Small Heath
11. Birmingham Yardley
12. Coventry North East
13. Coventry North West
14. Coventry South
15. Dudley North
16. Dudley South
17. Halesowen and Rowley Regis
18. Meriden
19. Solihull
20. Stourbridge
21. Sutton Coldfield
22. Walsall North
23. Walsall South
24. Warley
25. West Bromwich East
26. West Bromwich West
27. Wolverhampton North East
28. Wolverhampton South East
29. Wolverhampton South West
Boundaries 1997-2010

Parliamentary constituencies in West Midlands (1997-2010)

Name (2010-2024)
1. Aldridge-Brownhills
2. Birmingham Edgbaston
3. Birmingham Erdington
4. Birmingham Hall Green
5. Birmingham Hodge Hill
6. Birmingham Ladywood
7. Birmingham Northfield
8. Birmingham Perry Barr
9. Birmingham Selly Oak
10. Birmingham Yardley
11. Coventry North East
12. Coventry North West
13. Coventry South
14. Dudley North
15. Dudley South
16. Halesowen and Rowley Regis
17. Meriden
18. Solihull
19. Stourbridge
20. Sutton Coldfield
21. Walsall North
22. Walsall South
23. Warley
24. West Bromwich East
25. West Bromwich West
26. Wolverhampton North East
27. Wolverhampton South East
28. Wolverhampton South West
Boundaries 2010-2024

Parliamentary constituencies in West Midlands (2010-2024)

== Results history ==
Primary data source: House of Commons research briefing - General election results from 1918 to 2019

=== 2024 ===
The number of votes cast for each political party who fielded candidates in constituencies comprising West Midlands in the 2024 general election were as follows: (Note: Excludes the cross-county constituency of Kingswinford and South Staffordshire which has a majority Staffordshire electorate)

Party	Votes	%	Change from 2019	Seats	Change from 2019
Labour	387,609	38.7%	▼5.4%	21	▲7
Conservative	226,095	22.6%	▼21.8%	4	▼10
Reform	173,143	17.3%	▲14.8%	0	0
Greens	64,632	6.5%	▲4.2%	0	0
Liberal Democrats	52,746	5.3%	▼0.8%	0	0
Others	96,229	9.6%	▲9.0%	1	▲1
Total	1,000,454	100.0		26	

=== Percentage votes ===
Election year	1983	1987	1992	1997	2001	2005	2010	2015	2017	2019	2024
Labour^{1}	37.4	39.8	44.0	53.3	51.3	44.4	37.6	42.5	52.4	44.1	38.7
Conservative	41.7	42.6	42.1	29.8	30.6	29.5	33.5	33.1	39.9	44.4	22.6
Reform	-	-	-	-	-	-	-	-	-	2.5	17.3
Green Party	-	*	*	*	*	*	0.5	2.9	1.2	2.3	6.5
Liberal Democrat^{2}	20.4	17.3	12.0	11.3	13.1	18.1	19.3	5.5	3.7	6.1	5.3
UKIP	-	-	-	*	*	*	3.8	15.5	2.4	*	*
Other	0.5	0.3	1.9	5.6	5.1	8.1	5.2	0.6	0.4	0.6	9.6

^{1}1997 - includes The Speaker, Betty Boothroyd who stood unopposed by the 3 main parties in West Bromwich West

^{2}1983 & 1987 - SDP–Liberal Alliance

* Included in Other

=== Seats ===
Year	Labour	Conservative	Liberal Democrat^{1}	Independents^{2}	Total
2024	21	4	0	1	26
2019	14	14	0	0	28
2017	20	8	0	0	28
2015	21	7	0	0	28
2010	19	7	2	0	28
2005	24	3	2	0	29
2001	25	4	0	0	29
1997	24	4	0	1	29
1992	21	10	0	0	31
1987	17	14	0	0	31
1983	18	13	0	0	31

^{1}1983 & 1987 - SDP–Liberal Alliance ^{2}Includes The Speaker seeking re-election.

=== Maps ===
1983

1987

1992

1997

2001

2005

2010

2015

2017

2019

2024

== Historical representation by party ==
A cell marked → (with a different colour background to the preceding cell) indicates that the previous MP continued to sit under a new party name.

=== 1983 to 2010 ===
Conservative Independent Labour Labour Liberal Democrats Speaker

Constituency	1983	1987	1992	92	94	1997	00	2001	04	2005	06
Birmingham Sparkbrook	Hattersley										
Coventry South West	Butcher										
Warley East	Faulds										
Aldridge-Brownhills	Shepherd										
Birmingham Edgbaston	Jill Knight					Stuart					
Birmingham Erdington	Corbett							Simon			
Birmingham Hall Green	Eyre	Hargreaves				McCabe					
Birmingham Hodge Hill	Davis								Byrne		
Birmingham Ladywood	C. Short										→
Birmingham Northfield	King		Burden								
Birmingham Perry Barr	Rooker							K. Mahmood			
Birmingham Selly Oak	Beaumont-Dark		L. Jones								
Birmingham Small Heath / B Sparkbrook & S H (1997)	Howell		Godsiff								
Birmingham Yardley	Bevan		E. Morris							Hemming	
Coventry North East	Park	J. Hughes	Ainsworth								
Coventry North West	Robinson										
Coventry SE / Coventry S (1997)	Nellist		Cunningham								
Dudley East / Dudley North (1997)	Gilbert					Cranston				Austin	
Dudley West / Dudley South (1997)	Blackburn				Pearson						
Halesowen & Stourbridge / H & Rowley Regis (1997)	Stokes		Hawksley			Heal					
Meriden	Mills					Spelman					
Solihull	Grieve	Taylor								Burt	
Sutton Coldfield	Fowler							Mitchell			
Walsall North	Winnick										
Walsall South	George										
Warley West / Warley (1997)	Archer		Spellar								
Wolverhampton North East	R. Short	Hicks	Purchase								
Wolverhampton South East	Edwards	Turner								McFadden	
Wolverhampton South West	Budgen					J. Jones		Marris			
West Bromwich East	Snape							Watson			
West Bromwich West	Boothroyd			→			A. Bailey				
Stourbridge						Shipley				Waltho	
Constituency	1983	1987	1992	92	94	1997	00	2001	04	2005	06

=== 2010 to present ===
Conservative Independent Labour Liberal Democrats Your

Constituency	2010	2015	2017	19	2019	22	2024	25	
Aldridge-Brownhills	Shepherd	Morton							
Birmingham Edgbaston	Stuart		Gill						
Birmingham Erdington	Dromey					Hamilton			
Birmingham Hall Green / B. H. G. & Moseley ('24)	Godsiff				Ali				
Birmingham Hodge Hill / B. H. H. & Solihull N ('24)	Byrne								
Birmingham Ladywood	S. Mahmood								
Birmingham Northfield	Burden				Sambrook		Turner		
Birmingham Perry Barr	K. Mahmood						Khan		
Birmingham Selly Oak	McCabe						Carns		
Birmingham Yardley	Hemming	Phillips							
Coventry North East / Coventry East (2024)	Ainsworth	Fletcher					Creagh		
Coventry North West	Robinson				Owatemi				
Coventry South	Cunningham				Sultana			→	→
Dudley North / Dudley (2024)	Austin			→	Longhi		Kumar		
Dudley South	Kelly	Wood							N/A
Halesowen & Rowley Regis / Halesowen (2024)	J. Morris						Ballinger		
Meriden / Meriden & Solihull East (2024)	Spelman				Bhatti				
Solihull / Solihull West & Shirley (2024)	Burt	Knight				→	Shastri-Hurst		
Stourbridge	James				Webb		Eccles		
Sutton Coldfield	Mitchell								
Walsall North	Winnick		E. Hughes						N/A
Walsall South / Walsall & Bloxwich (2024)	Vaz								
Warley / Smethwick (2024)	Spellar						Josan		
West Bromwich East / West Bromwich (2024)	Watson				Richards		Coombes		
West Bromwich W / Tipton & Wednesbury (2024)	A. Bailey				S. Bailey		Bance		
Wolverhampton North East	Reynolds				Stevenson		Brackenridge		
Wolverhampton South East	McFadden								
Wolverhampton SW / Wolverhampton W (2024)	Uppal	Marris	Smith		Anderson		Juss		
Constituency	2010	2015	2017	19	2019	22	2024	25	

== See also ==
- Parliamentary constituencies in the West Midlands (region)
