= Foot shadow cabinet =

Shadow Cabinet of the United Kingdom from 1983 to 1992

Foot Shadow Cabinet
- Shadow Cabinet of the United Kingdom
- 1980 – 1983
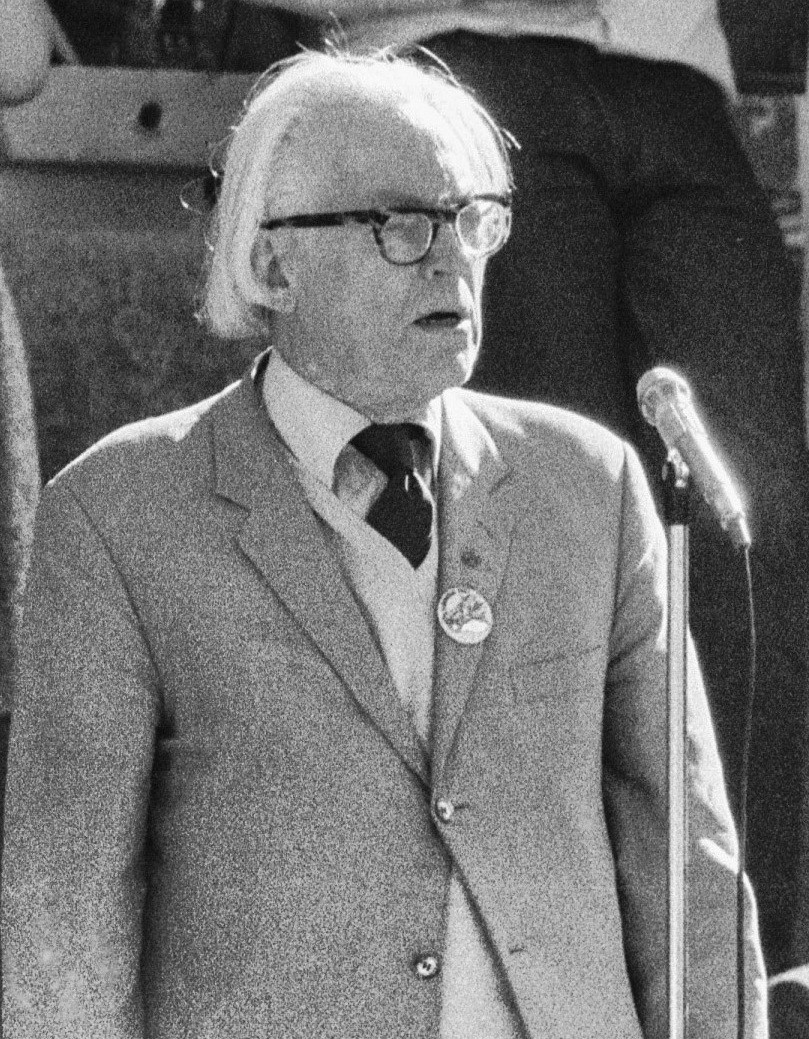
- Date formed: 10 November 1980
- Date dissolved: 2 October 1983

People and organisations
- Monarch: Elizabeth II
- Leader of the Opposition: Michael Foot
- Deputy Leader of the Opposition: Denis Healey
- Member party: Labour Party
- Status in legislature: Official Opposition

History
- Election: 1980 Labour Party leadership election
- Legislature terms: 48th UK Parliament; 49th UK Parliament
- Predecessor: Callaghan shadow cabinet
- Successor: Kinnock shadow cabinet

Michael Foot was Leader of the Opposition from 4 November 1980, following his victory in the 1980 leadership election, to 2 October 1983, when he was replaced by Neil Kinnock at the 1983 leadership election. The 1980 leadership contest was triggered by James Callaghan's loss at the 1979 general election, and the 1983 contest by Foot's own disastrous defeat in the 1983 general election.

Until 2011, the Labour MPs elected the bulk of the membership of the Shadow Cabinet. The leader was expected to assign portfolios to those elected, but was able to assign portfolios to MPs not elected to the Shadow Cabinet and to refuse to assign portfolios to elected members. For example, William Rodgers was not given a portfolio despite winning in the 1980 Shadow Cabinet elections. When he left the party months later to help create the Social Democratic Party, Tony Benn automatically joined the Shadow Cabinet. Foot also chose not to give the more radical Benn a portfolio. When Benn lost in the 1981 Shadow Cabinet elections, all the new members received portfolios (Shadow Minister for Europe became a Shadow Cabinet post for the rest of Foot's tenure as leader).

== Shadow Cabinet List ==
| Portfolio | Shadow Minister | Term |
|---|---|---|
| Leader of Her Majesty's Most Loyal Opposition; Leader of the Labour Party | The Rt Hon. Michael Foot MP | 1980–1983 |
| Deputy Leader of the Labour Party; Shadow Foreign Secretary | The Rt Hon. Denis Healey MP | 1980–1983 |
| Shadow Chancellor of the Exchequer | The Rt Hon. Peter Shore MP | 1980–1983 |
| Shadow Home Secretary | The Rt Hon. Roy Hattersley MP | 1980–1983 |
| Shadow Secretary of State for Defence | Brynmor John MP | 1980–1981 |
| Shadow Secretary of State for Defence | The Rt Hon. John Silkin MP | 1981–1983 |
| Shadow Leader of the House of Commons | The Rt Hon. John Silkin MP | 1980–1983 |
| Shadow Secretary of State for Industry | The Rt Hon. Stan Orme MP | 1980–1983 |
| Shadow Secretary of State for Employment | The Rt Hon. Eric Varley MP | 1980–1983 |
| Shadow Secretary of State for Environment | The Rt Hon. Gerald Kaufman MP | 1980–1983 |
| Shadow minister with responsibility for policy development | The Rt Hon. Merlyn Rees MP | 1982–1983 |
| Shadow Secretary of State for Energy | The Rt Hon. Merlyn Rees MP | 1980–1982 |
| Shadow Secretary of State for Energy | The Rt Hon. John Smith MP | 1982–1983 |
| Shadow Secretary of State for Trade | The Rt Hon. John Smith MP | 1980–1982 |
| Shadow Secretary of State for Trade | The Rt Hon. Peter Archer MP | 1982–1983 |
| Shadow Secretary of State for Transport | The Rt Hon. Albert Booth MP | 1980–1983 |
| Shadow Minister of Agriculture, Fisheries and Food | The Rt Hon. Roy Mason MP | 1980–1981 |
| Shadow Minister of Agriculture, Fisheries and Food | Norman Buchan MP | 1981–1983 |
| Shadow Secretary of State for Social Services | Norman Buchan MP | 1980–1981 |
| Shadow Secretary of State for Social Services | Brynmor John MP | 1981–1983 |
| Shadow Secretary of State for Education and Science | Neil Kinnock MP | 1980–1983 |
| Shadow Secretary of State for Health | The Hon. Gwyneth Dunwoody MP | 1980–1983 |
| Shadow Secretary of State for Scotland | The Rt Hon. Bruce Millan MP | 1980–1983 |
| Shadow Secretary of State for Wales | The Rt Hon. Alec Jones MP | 1980–1983 |
| Shadow Secretary of State for Northern Ireland | The Rt Hon. Don Concannon MP | 1980–1983 |
| Shadow Minister for Overseas Development | Frank McElhone MP | 1980–1982 |
| Shadow Minister for Overseas Development | Guy Barnett MP | 1982–1983 |
| Shadow Minister without Portfolio | The Rt Hon. William Rodgers MP | 1980–1981 |
| Shadow Minister without Portfolio | The Rt Hon. Tony Benn MP | 1981 |
| Shadow Minister for Europe | Eric Heffer MP | 1981–1983 |
| Leader of the Opposition in the House of Lords | The Rt Hon. The Lord Peart PC | 1980–1982 |
| Leader of the Opposition in the House of Lords | The Rt Hon. The Lord Cledwyn of Penrhos PC | 1982–1983 |
| Opposition Chief Whip in the House of Commons | The Rt Hon. Michael Cocks MP | 1980–1983 |
| Opposition Chief Whip in the House of Lords | The Rt Hon. The Baroness Llewelyn-Davies of Hastoe PC | 1980–1982 |
| Opposition Chief Whip in the House of Lords | The Lord Ponsonby of Shulbrede | 1982–1983 |
| Shadow Attorney General | The Rt Hon. John Morris MP | 1980–1981 |
| Shadow Attorney General | The Rt Hon. Peter Archer MP | 1981–1982 |
| Shadow Attorney General | The Rt Hon. Arthur Davidson MP | 1982–1983 |

== Initial Shadow Cabinet ==
Foot announced his first Shadow Cabinet on 8 December 1980, following the 1980 Shadow Cabinet elections.

- Michael Foot – Leader of Her Majesty's Most Loyal Opposition
- Denis Healey – Deputy Leader of the Labour Party and Shadow Foreign Secretary
- Peter Shore – Shadow Chancellor of the Exchequer
- Roy Hattersley – Shadow Home Secretary
- John Silkin – Shadow Leader of the House of Commons
- Brynmor John – Shadow Secretary of State for Defence
- Stan Orme – Shadow Secretary of State for Industry
- Eric Varley – Shadow Secretary of State for Employment
- Gerald Kaufman – Shadow Secretary of State for Environment
- Merlyn Rees – Shadow Secretary of State for Energy
- John Smith – Shadow Secretary of State for Trade
- Albert Booth – Shadow Secretary of State for Transport
- Roy Mason – Shadow Minister of Agriculture, Fisheries and Food
- Neil Kinnock – Shadow Secretary of State for Education and Science
- Norman Buchan – Shadow Secretary of State for Social Services
- Gwyneth Dunwoody – Shadow Secretary of State for Health
- Bruce Millan – Shadow Secretary of State for Scotland
- Alec Jones – Shadow Secretary of State for Wales
- Don Concannon – Shadow Secretary of State for Northern Ireland
- Frank McElhone – Shadow Minister for Overseas Development
- John Morris – Shadow Attorney General
- William Rodgers – Shadow Minister without Portfolio
- The Lord Peart – Leader of the Opposition in the House of Lords
- Michael Cocks – Opposition Chief Whip in the House of Commons
- The Baroness Llewelyn-Davies of Hastoe – Opposition Chief Whip in the House of Lords

=== Changes ===
- 27 January 1981: Rodgers resigned from the Shadow Cabinet and was replaced by Tony Benn. This came days after Rodgers, Shirley Williams, David Owen, and Roy Jenkins (the "Gang of Four") created the Council for Social Democracy, a step along the way to their creation of the Social Democratic Party.

== 1981 reshuffle ==
On 24 November 1981, following the 1981 Shadow Cabinet elections, Foot reshuffled the Shadow Cabinet. Brynmor John moved from Defence to Social Services and was replaced by Silkin, who retained the post of Shadow Leader of the House. Buchnan replaced Mason at Agriculture. Benn, Mason, and Morris were dropped from the Shadow Cabinet. Peter Archer and Eric Heffer joined the Shadow Cabinet as Shadow Attorney General and Shadow Minister for Europe, respectively.

- Michael Foot – Leader of Her Majesty's Most Loyal Opposition
- Denis Healey – Deputy Leader of the Labour Party and Shadow Foreign Secretary
- Peter Shore – Shadow Chancellor of the Exchequer
- Roy Hattersley – Shadow Home Secretary
- John Silkin – Shadow Secretary of State for Defence and Shadow Leader of the House of Commons
- Brynmor John – Shadow Secretary of State for Social Services
- Stan Orme – Shadow Secretary of State for Industry
- Eric Varley – Shadow Secretary of State for Employment
- Gerald Kaufman – Shadow Secretary of State for Environment
- Merlyn Rees – Shadow Secretary of State for Energy
- John Smith – Shadow Secretary of State for Trade
- Albert Booth – Shadow Secretary of State for Transport
- Norman Buchan – Shadow Minister of Agriculture, Fisheries and Food
- Neil Kinnock – Shadow Secretary of State for Education and Science
- Gwyneth Dunwoody – Shadow Secretary of State for Health
- Bruce Millan – Shadow Secretary of State for Scotland
- Alec Jones – Shadow Secretary of State for Wales
- Don Concannon – Shadow Secretary of State for Northern Ireland
- Frank McElhone – Shadow Minister for Overseas Development
- Eric Heffer – Shadow Minister for Europe
- Peter Archer – Shadow Attorney General
- The Lord Peart – Leader of the Opposition in the House of Lords
- Michael Cocks – Opposition Chief Whip in the House of Commons
- The Baroness Llewelyn-Davies of Hastoe – Opposition Chief Whip in the House of Lords

=== Changes ===
- 22 September 1982: McElhone died, replaced by Guy Barnett.
- 4 November 1982: Lord Cledwyn of Penrhos defeated the incumbent leader in the Lords, Lord Peart, by 60–37. Lord Ponsonby of Shulbrede also succeeded Baroness Llewelyn-Davies as Lords Chief Whip for Labour.
- 24 November 1982: Foot conducted a mini-reshuffle following the 1982 Shadow Cabinet elections. Smith moved from Trade to Energy, and Rees moved to a "policy role". Archer replaced Smith at Trade. In turn, Arthur Davidson replaced him as Shadow Attorney General until he lost his seat in the 1983 General Election, when John Morris returned to the role of Shadow Attorney General (which he would hold through successive leaders until 1997, when he became Attorney General).
- 20 March 1983: Jones Died, replaced by Denzil Davies
