= 1982 Labour Party Shadow Cabinet election =

United Kingdom party election

Elections to the United Kingdom Labour Party's Shadow Cabinet (more formally, its "Parliamentary Committee") took place on 18 November 1982. In addition to the 15 members elected, the Leader (Michael Foot), Deputy Leader (Denis Healey), Labour Chief Whip (Michael Cocks), Labour Leader in the House of Lords (Lord Cledwyn of Penrhos), and Chairman of the Parliamentary Labour Party (Jack Dormand) were automatically members.

All 15 members elected the previous year were retained. The value of being the top loser dropped as by-elections would be held for future vacancies under a change in the Parliamentary Labour Party's rules. The results for 20 of the 40 candidates are listed below (Note: The Glasgow Herald confirms Kaufman and Kinnock placed first and second. Since none of the three winners for whom vote are not known were among the few who received more votes, Brynmor John could not have done better than 105, his 1981 result. As such the rankings from 7th to 15 are uncertain.):

Rank	Prior rank	Candidate	Constituency	Votes
1	2	Gerald Kaufman	Manchester Ardwick	142
2	7	Neil Kinnock	Bedwellty	131
3	1	Peter Shore	Stepney and Poplar	129
4	3	Roy Hattersley	Birmingham Sparkbrook	127
5	5	Eric Varley	Chesterfield	122
6	8	Albert Booth	Barrow and Furness	118
7	4	John Silkin	Lewisham Deptford	103
8	9	John Smith	North Lanarkshire	102
9	14	Peter Archer	Warley West	101
10	11	Stan Orme	Salford West	100
11	6	Merlyn Rees	Leeds South	93
12	10	Brynmor John	Pontypridd	90
13=	15	Gwyneth Dunwoody	Crewe	85
13=	12	Bruce Millan	Glasgow Craigton	85
15	13	Eric Heffer	Liverpool Walton	82
16	?	Tony Benn	Bristol South East	75
17†	17	Robin Cook	Edinburgh Central	73
17†	?	Joan Lestor	Eton and Slough	73
19	?	John Golding	Newcastle-under-Lyme	72
20	16	Norman Buchan	West Renfrewshire	70

== Footnotes ==
Notes
