= West Midlands Regional Select Committee =

The West Midlands Regional Select Committee was one of nine regional select committees of the House of Commons in the Parliament of the United Kingdom. The establishment of the committee was agreed by the House of Commons on 12 November 2008, following the appointment of 'regional ministers' by Gordon Brown on his appointment as Prime Minister in June 2007. The committee came into existence on 1 January 2009 and ceased to exist upon the dissolution of Parliament on 12 April 2010.

The purpose of the committee was "to examine regional strategies and the work of regional bodies" in the West Midlands.

== Membership ==
Member	Party	Constituency
Richard Burden MP (Chair)	Labour	Birmingham Northfield
Adrian Bailey MP	Labour	West Bromwich West
Janet Dean MP	Labour	Burton
James Plaskitt MP	Labour	Warwick and Leamington
Richard Taylor MP	Independent Health Concern	Wyre Forest
Joan Walley MP	Labour	Stoke-on-Trent North

Source: Parliament website

=== Changes ===
Occasionally, the House of Commons orders changes to be made in terms of membership of select committees, as proposed by the Leader of the House. Such changes are shown below.

Date	Outgoing Member & Party	Constituency	→	New Member & Party	Constituency	Source
10 November 2009	David Kidney MP (Labour)	Stafford	→	Janet Dean MP (Labour)	Burton	Hansard
