= 1982 Birmingham Northfield by-election =

UK parliamentary by-election

← 1979	28 October 1982	1983 →

Constituency of Birmingham Northfield
- Turnout: 55.0%
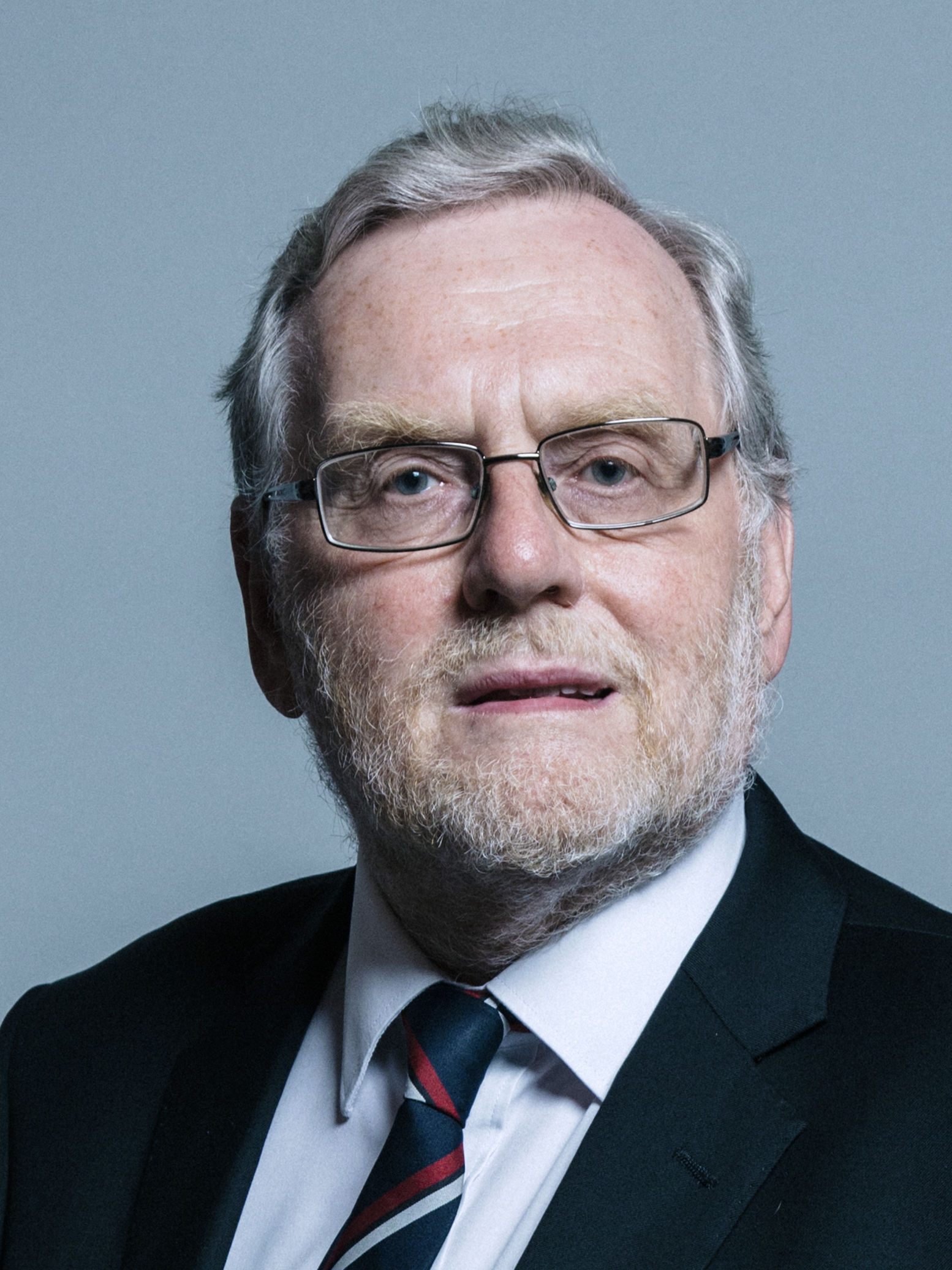

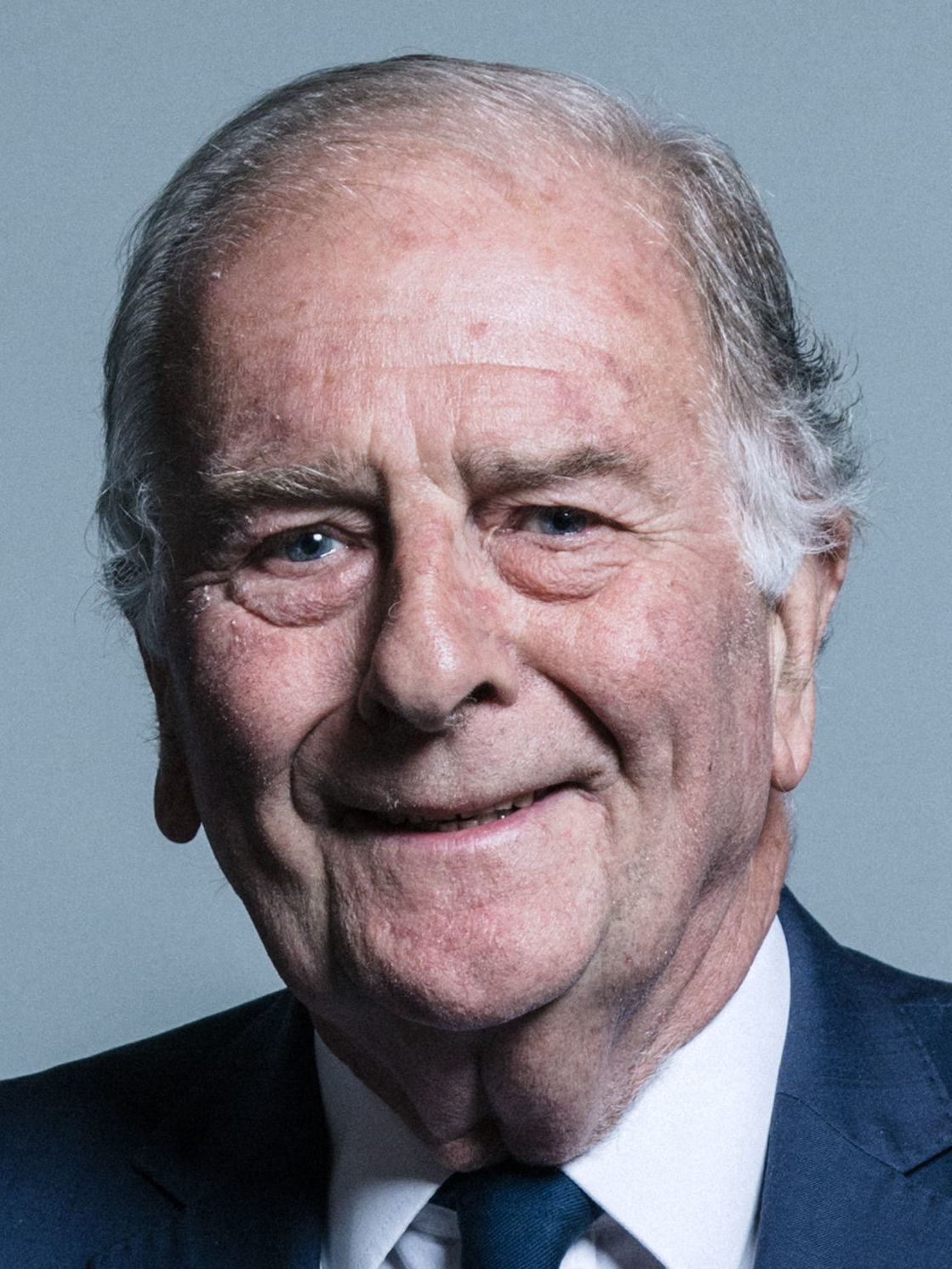
	First party	Second party	Third party
			Lib
Candidate	John Spellar	Roger Gale	Stephen Ridley
Party	Labour	Conservative	Liberal
Popular vote	15,904	15,615	11,453
Percentage	36.3%	35.6%	26.1%
Swing	▼8.8%	▼9.8%	▲18.0%
MP before election
Jocelyn Cadbury
Conservative
Elected MP
John Spellar
Labour

The 1982 Birmingham, Northfield by-election of 28 October 1982 was held following the death of Conservative Member of Parliament (MP) Jocelyn Cadbury on 31 July 1982. The seat was gained by the Labour Party in a defeat for Margaret Thatcher's government, ironically just after opinion polls showed an upswing in Conservative support following the victorious Falklands War campaign months earlier. The Conservatives regained the seat at the 1983 general election.

== Candidates ==
- John Spellar, the winning Labour candidate, would later serve as MP for Warley West.
- Roger Gale would later serve as MP for North Thanet.
- Stephen Ridley, a solicitor, ran on a campaign of introducing works councils to give workers more say in their jobs and improving local amenities.
- Ian Anderson emerged as the leading figure of the Flag Group wing of the National Front and later became leader of the party.
- Peter Sheppard ran on an anti-National Front, anti-Margaret Thatcher platform. He was chairman of the All Birmingham Committee Against Racism and Fascism.
- Bill Boaks, a serial independent candidate during the 1970s who frequently managed only double figure vote totals, was standing in his final by-election (he was also a candidate in the Peckham by-election, which was held simultaneously).

== Result ==
Birmingham, Northfield by-election, 1982
Party	Candidate	Votes	%	±%
Labour	John Spellar	15,904	36.3	−8.8
Conservative	Roger Gale	15,615	35.6	−9.8
Liberal	Stephen Ridley	11,453	26.1	+18.0
National Front	Ian Anderson	411	0.9	−0.2
Communist	Peter Sheppard	349	0.8	N/A
People's Progressive Party	Ronald Taylor	63	0.2	N/A
Democratic Monarchist, Public Safety, White Resident	Bill Boaks	60	0.1	N/A
Majority		289	0.7	N/A
Turnout		43,855	55.0	−15.6
Labour gain from Conservative		Swing	-0.51	

== Aftermath ==
The result gave the Labour Party its first gain in a by-election in Britain since 1971. Yet while Labour had regained the seat which it had lost in 1979, the Conservatives were reported to be delighted at only narrowly losing given that the seat had been their third most vulnerable based on the 1979 results. Norman Tebbit, then a Conservative Cabinet minister, noted his party had come "within an ace of holding one of our most marginal constituencies" and argued that the results in Northfield and the by-election held on the same day for the Peckham constituency showed that the intervention of the Alliance allowed Labour to win. Writing in The Glasgow Herald, political journalist Geoffrey Parkhouse argued that winning Northfield saved Labour leader Michael Foot "from disaster", but the closeness of the result meant it was a "desperate victory" for him. He also argued that the results showed that Margaret Thatcher's government was on course to win the next election, but that the Alliance's potential to take votes from the Conservatives could yet prevent them from gaining an overall majority.
