= International Development Committee =

UK House of Commons select committee

The International Development Committee is a select committee of the House of Commons in the Parliament of the United Kingdom. The remit of the committee is to examine the expenditure, administration and policy of the international aid functions of the Foreign, Commonwealth and Development Office and public bodies which work with the Office in relation to international aid and official development assistance. The Independent Commission for Aid Impact reports to this Select Committee.

The committee was responsible for scrutiny of the International Development Committee's predecessor, the Department for International Development.

== Chairs ==
Committee chairs include those listed below.

Name	Start	End	Party	Constituency
Bowen Wells	14 July 1997	11 May 2001	Conservative	Hertford and Stortford
Tony Baldry	19 July 2001	11 April 2005	Conservative	Banbury
Malcolm Bruce	14 July 2005	30 March 2015	Liberal Democrats	Gordon
Stephen Twigg	18 June 2015	6 November 2019	Labour	Liverpool West Derby
Sarah Champion	29 January 2020	present	Labour	Rotherham

== Membership ==
Membership of the committee is as follows:

Member	Party	Constituency
Sarah Champion MP (Chair)	Labour	Rotherham
Tracy Gilbert MP	Labour	Edinburgh North and Leith
Monica Harding MP	Liberal Democrats	Esher and Walton
Alicia Kearns MP	Conservative	Rutland and Stamford
Noah Law MP	Labour	St Austell and Newquay
Brian Mathew MP	Liberal Democrats	Melksham and Devizes
David Mundell MP	Conservative	Dumfriesshire, Clydesdale and Tweeddale
James Naish MP	Labour	Rushcliffe
Sam Rushworth MP	Labour	Bishop Auckland
Tulip Siddiq MP	Labour	Hampstead and Highgate
David Taylor MP	Labour	Hemel Hempstead

=== Changes since 2024 ===
Date	Outgoing Member & Party	Constituency	→	New Member & Party	Constituency	Source
16 December 2024	Gordon McKee MP (Labour)	Glasgow South	→	James Naish MP (Labour)	Rushcliffe	Hansard
24 March 2025	Laura Kyrke-Smith MP (Labour)	Aylesbury	→	Tracy Gilbert MP (Labour)	Edinburgh North and Leith	Hansard
27 October 2025	Alice Macdonald MP (Labour)	Norwich North	→	Janet Daby MP (Labour)	Lewisham East	Hansard
29 June 2026	David Reed MP (Conservative)	Exmouth and Exeter East	→	Alicia Kearns MP (Conservative)	Rutland and Stamford	Hansard
26 October 2025	Janet Daby MP (Labour)	Lewisham East	→	Tulip Siddiq MP (Labour)	Hampstead and Highgate	Hansard

== 2019-2024 Parliament ==
The chair was elected on 29 January 2020, with the members of the committee being announced on 2 March 2020.

Member	Party	Constituency
Sarah Champion MP (Chair)	Labour and Co-op	Rotherham
Richard Bacon MP	Conservative	South Norfolk
Theo Clarke MP	Conservative	Stafford
Brendan Clarke-Smith MP	Conservative	Bassetlaw
Pauline Latham MP	Conservative	Mid Derbyshire
Chris Law MP	Scottish National Party	Dundee West
Ian Liddell-Grainger MP	Conservative	Bridgwater and West Somerset
Navendu Mishra MP	Labour	Stockport
Kate Osamor MP	Labour Co-op (Note: Whip suspended 28 January to 8 May 2024.)	Edmonton
Dan Poulter MP	Conservative	Central Suffolk and North Ipswich
Virendra Sharma MP	Labour	Ealing Southall

=== Changes 2019-2024 ===
Date	Outgoing Member & Party	Constituency	→	New Member & Party	Constituency	Source
14 December 2021	Brendan Clarke-Smith MP (Conservative)	Bassetlaw	→	Nigel Mills MP (Conservative)	Amber Valley	Hansard
21 November 2022	Dan Poulter MP (Conservative)	Central Suffolk and North Ipswich	→	David Mundell MP (Conservative)	Dumfriesshire, Clydesdale and Tweeddale	Hansard
20 November 2023	Navendu Mishra MP (Labour)	Stockport	→	Rosena Allin-Khan MP (Labour)	Tooting	Hansard

== Membership 2017-2019 ==
The chair was elected on 12 July 2017, with the members of the committee being announced on 11 September 2017.

Member	Party	Constituency
Stephen Twigg MP (Chair)	Labour and Co-op	Liverpool West Derby
Richard Burden MP	Labour	Birmingham Northfield
James Duddridge MP	Conservative	Rochford and Southend East
Nigel Evans MP	Conservative	Ribble Valley
Pauline Latham MP	Conservative	Mid Derbyshire
Chris Law MP	Scottish National Party	Dundee West
Ivan Lewis MP	Labour	Bury South
Lloyd Russell-Moyle MP	Labour	Brighton Kemptown
Paul Scully MP	Conservative	Sutton & Cheam
Virendra Sharma MP	Labour	Ealing Southall
Henry Smith MP	Conservative	Crawley

=== Changes 2017-2019 ===
Date	Outgoing Member & Party	Constituency	→	New Member & Party	Constituency	Source
4 June 2018	James Duddridge MP (Conservative)	Rochford and Southend East	→	Mark Menzies MP (Conservative)	Fylde	Hansard

== Membership 2015-2017 ==
The chair was elected on 18 June 2015, with members being announced on 8 July 2015.

Member	Party	Constituency
Stephen Twigg MP (Chair)	Labour (Co-op)	Liverpool West Derby
Fiona Bruce MP	Conservative	Congleton
Dr Lisa Cameron MP	Scottish National Party	East Kilbride, Strathaven and Lesmahagow
Nigel Evans MP	Conservative	Ribble Valley
Helen Grant MP	Conservative	Maidstone and The Weald
Fabian Hamilton MP	Labour	Leeds North East
Pauline Latham MP	Conservative	Mid Derbyshire
Jeremy Lefroy MP	Conservative	Stafford
Wendy Morton MP	Conservative	Aldridge-Brownhills
Albert Owen MP	Labour	Ynys Môn
Virendra Sharma MP	Labour	Ealing Southall

=== Changes 2015-2017 ===
Date	Outgoing Member & Party	Constituency	→	New Member & Party	Constituency	Source
8 February 2016	Fabian Hamilton MP (Labour)	Leeds North East	→	Stephen Doughty MP (Labour and Co-op)	Cardiff South and Penarth	Hansard
31 October 2016	Helen Grant MP (Conservative)	Maidstone and The Weald	→	Paul Scully MP (Conservative)	Sutton and Cheam	Hansard
20 February 2017	Albert Owen MP (Labour)	Ynys Môn	→	Ivan Lewis MP (Labour)	Bury South	Hansard

== Membership 2010-2015 ==
The chair was elected on 10 June 2010, with members being announced on 12 July 2010.

Member	Party	Constituency
Sir Malcolm Bruce MP (Chair)	Liberal Democrat	Gordon
Hugh Bayley MP	Labour	York Central
Russell Brown MP	Labour	Dumfries and Galloway
Richard Burden MP	Labour	Birmingham Northfield
James Clappison MP	Conservative	Hertsmere
Richard Harrington MP	Conservative	Watford
Pauline Latham MP	Conservative	Mid Derbyshire
Jeremy Lefroy MP	Conservative	Stafford
Ann McKechin MP	Labour	Glasgow North
Anas Sarwar MP	Labour	Glasgow Central
Chris White MP	Conservative	Warwick and Leamington

=== Changes 2010-2015 ===
Date	Outgoing Member & Party	Constituency	→	New Member & Party	Constituency	Source
2 November 2010	Russell Brown MP (Labour)	Dumfries and Galloway	→	Michael McCann MP (Labour)	East Kilbride, Strathaven and Lesmahagow	Hansard
2 November 2010	Ann McKechin MP (Labour)	Glasgow North	→	Alison McGovern MP (Labour)	Wirral South	Hansard
14 February 2011	James Clappison MP (Conservative)	Hertsmere	→	Sam Gyimah MP (Conservative)	East Surrey	Hansard
18 June 2012	Anas Sarwar MP (Labour)	Glasgow Central	→	Fiona O'Donnell MP (Labour)	East Lothian	Hansard
5 November 2012	Sam Gyimah MP (Conservative)	East Surrey	→	Fiona Bruce MP (Conservative)	Congleton	Hansard
5 November 2012	Richard Harrington MP (Conservative)	Watford	→	Mark Pritchard MP (Conservative)	The Wrekin	Hansard
4 February 2013	Alison McGovern MP (Labour)	Wirral South	→	Fabian Hamilton MP (Labour)	Leeds North East	Hansard
4 November 2013	Richard Burden MP (Labour)	Birmingham Northfield	→	Sir Tony Cunningham MP (Labour)	Workington	Hansard
4 November 2013	Mark Pritchard MP (Conservative)	The Wrekin	→	Vacant		Hansard
11 November 2013	Vacant		→	Peter Luff MP (Conservative)	Mid Worcestershire	Hansard

== See also ==
- Parliamentary committees of the United Kingdom
