= Laurence Turner (politician) =

British politician

Laurence Turner MP
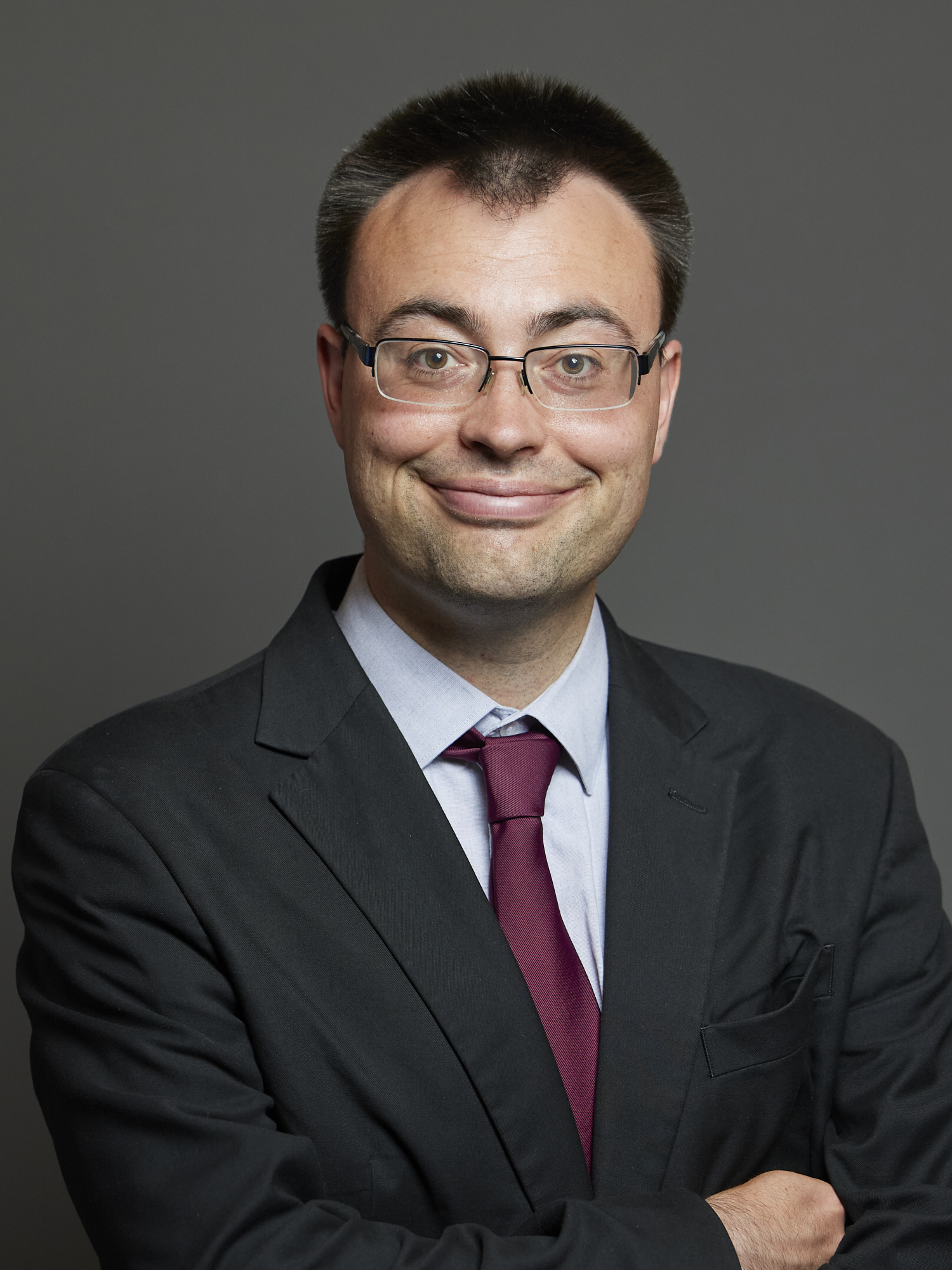
- Official portrait, 2024

Member of Parliament for Birmingham Northfield
- Incumbent
- Assumed office 4 July 2024
- Preceded by: Gary Sambrook
- Majority: 5,389 (14.3%)

Assistant Government Whip
- Incumbent
- Assumed office July 2026
- Prime Minister: Andy Burnham

Personal details
- Born: May 1988 (age 38)
- Party: Labour
- Education: Wadham College, Oxford (BA, MSt)
- Website: https://laurence4northfield.com/

Laurence David Russell Turner (born May 1988) is a British Labour Party politician and trade unionist, who has been Member of Parliament (MP) for Birmingham Northfield since 2024.

== Early life and education ==
Turner was born in May 1988. His parents were teachers and he grew up in Nottingham, Nottinghamshire, England. He studied at Wadham College, Oxford and Birkbeck, University of London.

== Career ==
Turner worked as a constituency assistant and researcher (2011–2012), then as a parliamentary assistant (2012–2015) in the House of Commons. The MPs he worked with were Chris Leslie, Lillian Greenwood and Richard Burden. He then worked for the Labour Party as a policy advisor specialising in transport from 2015 to 2016. From 2017 until his election as an MP, he worked at the GMB union, as head of research and policy. He was also a director of the Labour Research Department from 2018 to 2024.

=== Member of Parliament ===
Turner was imposed as the candidate for Birmingham Northfield by the Labour NEC at short notice at the beginning of the 2024 general election campaign, when existing candidate Alex Aitken had to step down for "personal reasons".

On 4 July 2024, he was elected Member of Parliament (MP) for Birmingham Northfield with 14,929 votes (39.6%) and a majority of 5,389. On 29 July 2024, he made his maiden speech in the House of Commons during a debate on the Passenger Railway Services (Public Ownership) Bill.

Since July 2026, Turner has held the position of Assistant Government Whip.

== Personal life ==
Turner has dyspraxia, and was a director of the Dyspraxia Foundation from 2020 to 2023.

Parliament of the United Kingdom
Preceded by Gary Sambrook	Member of Parliament for Birmingham Northfield; 2024–present	Incumbent
