= Derek Robinson (trade unionist) =

British trade unionist (1927–2017)

- Born: 1927; Cradley, Worcestershire
- Died: 31 October 2017 (aged 90)
- Other name: Red Robbo
- Occupation: Trade Unionist
- Years active: 1970s
- Known for: British Leyland trade union leader
- Political party: Communist Party of Great Britain, Communist Party of Britain

Derek Robinson (1927–2017) was a British trade unionist. For much of the 1970s, he was a convenor and shop steward at the British Leyland car manufacturing company. He was commonly referred to in the press as "Red Robbo".

== Career ==
Robinson was born in Cradley, then in Worcestershire and began work in the motor industry as an apprentice at the Austin Motor Company in Longbridge during the Second World War, training as a tool maker. He soon became a member of the Amalgamated Engineering Union (AEU) and joined the Communist Party of Great Britain in 1951. He stood as a Communist candidate in four consecutive general elections in Birmingham, Northfield between 1966 and 1974.

British Leyland was the result of a series of mergers between different British motor vehicle manufacturers. By 1975, Robinson was the union convenor of the Longbridge plant in Birmingham, having worked his way up from the shop floor to serve as the deputy of the previous convenor, Dick Etheridge, a fellow member of the Communist Party.

With his network of representatives in the 42 different Leyland plants around the country, he led a long-running campaign of strikes around the company, which he argued were in protest at mismanagement, leading 523 walkouts at Leyland's Birmingham plant during a 30-month period. In 1975, British Leyland became bankrupt and was nationalised by the Government. In 1977, a new managing director, Michael Edwardes, was appointed. He aimed to find a resolution to the ongoing industrial disputes and turn the company around. Robinson, for his part, supported the development of the policy of "participation", in which convenors and stewards would work together with company management.

Robinson had seen the idea of "participation" as central both to his political aims and to making British Leyland a success, stating: "If we make Leyland successful, it will be a political victory. It will prove that ordinary working people have got the intelligence and determination to run industry".

During the 1970s union organisation in British Leyland was split between the largely Communist Party-orientated stewards under Etheridge, and later Robinson, at Longbridge, and a smaller number of Trotskyist stewards based at the more militant Cowley plant. Many of the individual workers, however, took a more militant line than that espoused by the CP officials. An article by Frank Hughes in Workers' Liberty suggests that Robinson, by supporting the introduction of the "measured day work" system in place of piecework and by encouraging the adoption of "participation", in fact destroyed the relationship between stewards and the shop floor and left them unable to control unofficial strikes.

== Relationship with the press, and dismissal ==
The filmmaker Ken Loach suggested that Robinson was unfairly smeared by the press of the time; contrary to their depiction of him controlling strikes at will, Loach said, he in fact spent much of his time attempting to prevent unofficial strikes. This viewpoint was examined by Loach in part of an (untransmitted) documentary film series, Questions of Leadership (1983).

Margaret Thatcher later described Robinson in her memoirs as a "notorious agitator". Many years later, Robinson commented "The pressures were immense but were it not for the ideological understanding that I had, I could very well have ended up with a nervous breakdown".

A 2002 BBC documentary series by Peter Taylor revealed that in the late 1970s MI5 had been attempting to undermine Robinson through an agent they had placed amongst his union officials; Edwardes stated that he had been "privileged to read minutes of meetings of the [...] joint committee of the Communist Party and our shop stewards", which had been passed to him via the Government.

Robinson was accused of causing as many as 523 strikes yet, when interviewed, admitted to no more than 3, with one of those relating to his own sacking. While many of the strikes at the Longbridge were over serious matters (such as a worker drowning in a paint bath), many actions did not help the workers cause. In May 1979, for example, workers walked out over a demand for the company to supply them with Marks & Spencer underwear, and again the same month when someone simply attempted to repair a typewriter. In April 1977, trainees barricaded a training room, preventing the trainer from entering to train them, and in another instance there was a walk-out when someone fell off a mat. There was also a strike when someone found a dead cat.

Robinson was eventually dismissed by BL in November 1979 for putting his name to a pamphlet that criticised the BL management, and refusing to withdraw his name from the pamphlet when asked to do so. A ballot on a proposed strike in sympathy with Robinson and against his dismissal was lost, with 14,000 votes against and only 600 in favour.

Taylor's documentary suggested that this was a result of the MI5 agent's activity, with Edwardes acknowledging that the removal of Robinson was in some ways necessary for the company's preparations to bring the new Austin Metro into production. Longbridge was being substantially redeveloped and expanded for the new car, whose assembly was heavily automated in comparison to previous models and job losses would have been inevitable: "It was planned only in the sense...well, the answer is 'Yes', from a strategic point of view we knew that we couldn't have the Metro and him. Whether or not we wanted him to go, his actions made it inevitable that he would have to go".

== After British Leyland ==
Robinson subsequently applied for several engineering jobs and for a position as an organiser for the AEU in the Midlands, but these were rejected. He became a sales representative for the Morning Star newspaper, worked as a tutor in trade union studies at Bilston College, Wolverhampton during the 1980s and 1990s, and was national chair of the Communist Party of Britain for a period in the 1990s. He was survived by a daughter, Stephanie, and step-children from his relationship with Phyllis Davis.
