= 1981 Labour Party Shadow Cabinet election =

Elections to the Labour Party's Shadow Cabinet (more formally, its "Parliamentary Committee") took place on 19 November 1981. There were 15 posts, rather than 12 as in previous years. In addition to the 15 members elected, the Leader (Michael Foot), Deputy Leader (Denis Healey), Labour Chief Whip (Michael Cocks), Labour Leader in the House of Lords (Lord Peart), and Chairman of the Parliamentary Labour Party (Jack Dormand) were automatically members.

Of the 12 incumbent members, 10 were re-elected. Tony Benn, who was the top loser in 1980 automatically took the Bill Rodgers when the latter left the party to create the Social Democratic Party. He lost again in this election. It is unclear whether Roy Mason lost re-election or did not stand. The results of the election, though incomplete, are below.

Colour key	Retained in the Shadow Cabinet
Colour key	Joined the Shadow Cabinet
Colour key	Voted out of the Shadow Cabinet

Rank	Prior rank	Candidate	Constituency	Votes
1	4†	Peter Shore	Stepney and Poplar	147
2	3	Gerald Kaufman	Manchester Ardwick	142
3	1	Roy Hattersley	Birmingham Sparkbrook	135
4	7	John Silkin	Lewisham Deptford	132
5	2	Eric Varley	Chesterfield	131
6	4†	Merlyn Rees	Leeds South	128
7	12	Neil Kinnock	Bedwellty	118
8	8†	Albert Booth	Barrow and Furness	114
9	11	John Smith	North Lanarkshire	111
10	15	Brynmor John	Pontypridd	105
11	6	Stan Orme	Salford West	104
12	14	Bruce Millan	Glasgow Craigton	92
13	16	Eric Heffer	Liverpool Walton	84
14	?	Peter Archer	Warley West	83
15	?	Gwyneth Dunwoody	Crewe	82
16	18	Norman Buchan	West Renfrewshire	80
17	?	Robin Cook	Edinburgh Central	73
?	13	Tony Benn	Bristol South East	66
?	?	Giles Radice	Chester-le-Street	60
?	?	Jeremy Bray	Motherwell and Wishaw	?
?	?	James Craigen	Glasgow Maryhill	?
?	20	Tam Dalyell	West Lothian	?
?	?	Harry Ewing	Stirling, Falkirk and Grangemouth	?
?	?	Robert Hughes	Aberdeen North	?

Tony Benn had narrowly failed to defeat Denis Healey for the deputy leadership of the Labour Party a few months earlier. Shortly before the shadow cabinet election, Benn had broken with Michael Foot and the shadow cabinet by committing a future Labour Government to nationalising oil and gas assets without compensation, despite not having authorisation to do so. Benn then refused to commit to supporting collective shadow cabinet responsibility, causing Foot to announce a week prior to the ballot that he was personally opposed to Benn being re-elected to the shadow cabinet. The Glasgow Herald reported Benn planned to use the contest to renew his campaign against Healey, and that Foot believed that Benn ultimately would challenge him for the leadership of the Labour Party.

While Benn failed to be elected to the shadow cabinet, the size of his vote was reported as being a blow to Michael Foot, given that he had withdrawn his support from him and encouraged party colleagues to do likewise. Benn claimed to be pleased with the size of his vote, which represented a quarter of the parliamentary party, which he claimed was twice as great as he had expected. The Glasgow Herald noted that other than Foot, only five of those elected could be described as "Left-wingers". In contrast 8 members, including deputy leader Healey, were identified as "Right-wingers" and three members (Dunwoody, Millan and Shore) who were "Centre-to-right".
