= Rowley Regis and Tipton =

Parliamentary constituency in the United Kingdom, 1950–1974

- Former borough constituency for the House of Commons
- County: West Midlands

1950–February 1974
- Seats: One
- Created from: Kingswinford and Wednesbury
- Replaced by: West Bromwich West, Warley West

Rowley Regis and Tipton was a parliamentary constituency centred on the towns of Rowley Regis and Tipton in Staffordshire (now West Midlands). The Rowley Regis section of the constituency was in Worcestershire from 1966 until 1974, as was the Tividale area (originally in the borough of Dudley before those dates.

It returned one Member of Parliament (MP) to the House of Commons of the Parliament of the United Kingdom.

The constituency was created for the 1950 general election, and abolished for the February 1974 general election, with the Tipton area being incorporated into West Bromwich West and the Rowley Regis area being incorporated into Warley West. It was held by Labour for all 24 years of its existence.

== Boundaries ==
The Municipal Boroughs of Rowley Regis and Tipton.

== Members of Parliament ==
Election	Member	Party
1950	Arthur Henderson jnr	Labour
1966	Peter Archer	Labour
Feb 1974	constituency abolished	

== Elections ==
=== Elections in the 1950s ===
General election 1950: Rowley Regis and Tipton
Party	Candidate	Votes	%	±%
Labour	Arthur Henderson	31,988	64.27	
Conservative	R.B.J. Barnes	13,092	26.30	
Liberal	Arthur Yates	4,692	9.43	
Majority		18,896	37.97	
Turnout		49,772	83.58	
Labour win (new seat)				

General election 1951: Rowley Regis and Tipton
Party	Candidate	Votes	%	±%
Labour	Arthur Henderson	32,579	66.70	
Conservative	David Napley	16,263	33.30	
Majority		16,316	33.40	
Turnout		48,842	80.78	
Labour hold		Swing		

General election 1955: Rowley Regis and Tipton
Party	Candidate	Votes	%	±%
Labour	Arthur Henderson	28,166	65.25	
Conservative	Arthur A Hill	14,998	34.75	
Majority		13,168	30.50	
Turnout		43,164	72.05	
Labour hold		Swing		

General election 1959: Rowley Regis and Tipton
Party	Candidate	Votes	%	±%
Labour	Arthur Henderson	27,151	61.25	
Conservative	Arthur Taylor	17,174	38.75	
Majority		9,977	22.50	
Turnout		44,325	74.00	
Labour hold		Swing		

=== Elections in the 1960s ===
General election 1964: Rowley Regis and Tipton
Party	Candidate	Votes	%	±%
Labour	Arthur Henderson	25,352	60.21	
Conservative	Gordon Roy A Anstee	16,751	39.79	
Majority		8,601	20.42	
Turnout		42,103		
Labour hold		Swing		

General election 1966: Rowley Regis and Tipton
Party	Candidate	Votes	%	±%
Labour	Peter Archer	27,269	65.80	
Conservative	David S Adams	14,175	34.20	
Majority		13,094	31.60	
Turnout		41,444		
Labour hold		Swing		

=== Elections in the 1970s ===
General election 1970: Rowley Regis and Tipton
Party	Candidate	Votes	%	±%
Labour	Peter Archer	25,001	61.67	
Conservative	Peter M Smith	15,537	38.33	
Majority		9,464	23.34	
Turnout		40,538	63.33	
Labour hold		Swing		
