= Donald Chapman, Baron Northfield =

British politician (1930–2016)

The Right Honourable The Lord Northfield

Member of the House of Lords
- Lord Temporal
- Life peerage 20 January 1976 – 26 April 2013

Member of Parliament for Birmingham Northfield
- In office 25 October 1951 – 29 May 1970
- Preceded by: Raymond Blackburn
- Succeeded by: Raymond Carter

Personal details
- Born: 25 November 1923
- Died: 18 April 2013 (aged 89)
- Party: Labour
- Education: Emmanuel College, Cambridge

William Donald Chapman, Baron Northfield (25 November 1923 – 18 April 2013) was a British Labour politician.

== Career ==
Chapman was educated at Barnsley Grammar School and Emmanuel College, Cambridge, where he graduated with a degree in economics in 1948. He was the college's senior researcher in agricultural economics from 1943 to 1946.

He took part in local politics in Cambridge town, where he was a member of the City Council from 1945 to 1947, and concurrent secretary of Cambridge Trades Council and local Labour Party from 1945 to 1957. Nationally, he was research secretary (1948–49) then general secretary (1949–53) of the Fabian Society.

He was Member of Parliament (MP) for Birmingham Northfield from 1951 until he stood down in 1970. He was a fellow of Nuffield College, Oxford, from 1971 to 1973, visiting fellow at the Centre for Contemporary Economics at the University of Sussex from 1973 to 1979, chairman of the Rural Development Commission from 1974 to 1980 and special adviser to the ECC Commission on Environmental Policy in 1981. From 1985 to 1988, he was Director of Wembley Stadium.

After being initially deputy-chairman, from 1975 to 1987 he was chairman of the Telford Development Corporation at a time of extensive development of the Telford New Town, in which he demanded better designed council housing and office developments. He lived during his time in post within the new town, once describing the land within which it was to sit as "21 square miles dominated by a coalfield in final decline". After retirement, he immigrated to Hawaii, U.S.A. but continued to have interest in the area as Chairman of the Maxell Educational Trust which was formed by Hitachi Maxell, one of the industrial companies he encouraged to move into Telford.

He was created a life peer as Baron Northfield, of Telford in the County of Shropshire on 20 January 1976. Lord Northfield never married and died in Honolulu, Hawaii, aged 89.

Parliament of the United Kingdom
Preceded by Raymond Blackburn	Member of Parliament for Birmingham Northfield; 1951–1970	Succeeded by Raymond Carter
Party political offices
Preceded by Andrew Filson	General Secretary of the Fabian Society; 1949–1953	Succeeded by Bill Rodgers
