= Warley (constituency) =

UK Parliament constituency (1997–2024)

- Former borough constituency for the House of Commons
- 2010–2024 boundary of Warley in West Midlands

- Location of West Midlands within England
- County: West Midlands
- Electorate: 63,024 (December 2010)
- Major settlements: Smethwick, Brandhall, Langley Green

1997–2024
- Seats: One
- Created from: Warley East, Warley West
- Replaced by: Smethwick

Warley was a constituency (Note: A borough constituency (for the purposes of election expenses and type of returning officer)) in the House of Commons of the UK Parliament. The constituency was represented since its creation in 1997 and until its abolition in 2024 by John Spellar, a member of the Labour Party. (Note: As with all constituencies, the constituency elects one Member of Parliament (MP) by the first past the post system of election at least every five years.)

As a result of the 2023 Periodic Review of Westminster constituencies, the seat was abolished. Subject to moderate boundary changes, including expansion to include most of the Blackheath ward, it was reformed as Smethwick, first contested at the 2024 general election.

== Constituency profile ==
The constituency had a wide range of housing on the gently hilly West Midlands terrain, with fast transport links to Birmingham, Dudley and Wolverhampton. Workless claimants, registered jobseekers, were in November 2012 significantly higher than the national average of 3.8%, at 7.7% of the population based on a statistical compilation by The Guardian however female unemployment, reflecting a central West Midlands pattern, perhaps with more women homemakers, unusually exceeded male unemployment at 10.1%.

== Boundaries ==
Map of boundaries 1997–2024

Warley was one of four constituencies covering the Metropolitan Borough of Sandwell, covering the south and south-east of the borough. It covered much of the former County Borough of Warley, including the town of Smethwick as well as Brandhall and Langley Green.

It consisted of the Metropolitan Borough of Sandwell wards of Abbey, Bristnall, Langley, Old Warley, St Paul's, Smethwick, and Soho and Victoria.

== History ==
Creation and forerunners

The constituency was formed in 1997, and was for the most part the former Warley East constituency. John Spellar of the Labour Party represented Warley since 1997, having previously represented Warley West. Warley East and Warley West had been held by Labour since their creation in 1974. Minor parts of the seat around Oldbury had been in the quite marginal Labour-Conservative seat of Oldbury and Halesowen before 1974.

Results of winning party

The 2015 result made the seat the 34th-safest of Labour's 232 seats by percentage of majority. The elections have to date resulted in the Labour incumbent, Spellar, gaining more than 50% of votes cast.

Opposition parties

The candidates fielded by the Conservative Party have taken the runner-up position since the seat's creation. Third place has varied between two parties to date in the seat's history.

Turnout

Turnout has ranged from 54.1% in 2001 to 65.1% in 1997.

== Members of Parliament ==
Election	Member	Party
1997	John Spellar	Labour
2024	Constituency abolished	

== Election results 1997–2024 ==
=== Elections in the 1990s ===
General election 1997: Warley
Party	Candidate	Votes	%	±%
Labour	John Spellar	24,813	63.8	
Conservative	Christopher Pincher	9,362	24.1	
Liberal Democrats	Jeremy Pursehouse	3,777	9.7	
Referendum	Krishna Gamre	941	2.4	
Majority		15,451	39.7	
Turnout		38,893	65.0	
Labour win (new seat)				

=== Elections in the 2000s ===
General election 2001: Warley
Party	Candidate	Votes	%	±%
Labour	John Spellar	19,007	60.5	−3.3
Conservative	Mark Pritchard	7,157	22.8	−1.3
Liberal Democrats	Ron Cockings	3,315	10.6	+0.9
Socialist Labour	Harbhajan Dardi	1,936	6.2	New
Majority		11,850	37.7	−2.0
Turnout		31,415	54.1	−10.9
Labour hold		Swing		

General election 2005: Warley
Party	Candidate	Votes	%	±%
Labour	John Spellar	17,462	54.4	−6.1
Conservative	Karen Bissell	7,315	22.8	0.0
Liberal Democrats	Tony Ferguson	4,277	13.3	+2.7
BNP	Simon Smith	1,761	5.5	New
Socialist Labour	Malcolm Connigale	637	2.0	−4.2
UKIP	David Matthews	635	2.0	New
Majority		10,147	31.6	−6.1
Turnout		32,087	57.1	+3.0
Labour hold		Swing	−3.0	

=== Elections in the 2010s ===
General election 2010: Warley
Party	Candidate	Votes	%	±%
Labour	John Spellar	20,240	52.9	−2.0
Conservative	Jas Parmar	9,484	24.8	+1.9
Liberal Democrats	Edward Keating	5,929	15.5	+2.3
UKIP	Nigel Harvey	2,617	6.8	+4.7
Majority		10,756	28.1	−4.9
Turnout		38,270	60.6	+3.4
Labour hold		Swing	−1.9	

General election 2015: Warley
Party	Candidate	Votes	%	±%
Labour	John Spellar	22,012	58.2	+5.3
Conservative	Tom Williams	7,310	19.3	−5.5
UKIP	Pete Durnell	6,237	16.5	+9.7
Green	Robert Buckman	1,465	3.9	New
Liberal Democrats	Catherine Smith	805	2.1	−13.4
Majority		14,702	38.9	+10.8
Turnout		37,829	59.3	−1.3
Labour hold		Swing	+5.4	

General election 2017: Warley
Party	Candidate	Votes	%	±%
Labour	John Spellar	27,004	67.2	+9.0
Conservative	Anthony Mangnall	10,521	26.2	+6.9
UKIP	Darryl Magher	1,349	3.4	−13.1
Liberal Democrats	Bryan Manley-Green	777	1.9	−0.2
Green	Mark Redding	555	1.4	−2.5
Majority		16,483	41.0	+2.1
Turnout		40,206	63.1	+3.8
Labour hold		Swing	+9.0	

General election 2019: Warley
Party	Candidate	Votes	%	±%
Labour	John Spellar	21,901	58.8	−8.4
Conservative	Chandra Kanneganti	10,390	27.9	+1.7
Brexit Party	Michael Cooper	2,469	6.6	New
Liberal Democrats	Bryan Manley-Green	1,588	4.3	+2.4
Green	Kathryn Downs	891	2.4	+1.0
Majority		11,511	30.9	−10.1
Turnout		37,239	59.7	−3.4
Labour hold		Swing	−5.1	

== See also ==
- List of parliamentary constituencies in the West Midlands (county)
