= Raymond Carter (British politician) =

British politician (1935–2020)

Member of Parliament for Birmingham Northfield
- In office 1970–1979

Western European Union Member
- In office 1974–1976

Personal details
- Born: 17 September 1935
- Died: 2 July 2020 (aged 84)
- Party: Labour
- Spouse: Jeanette Hills
- Children: 3
- Education: Reading Technical College; Stafford College of Technology

Raymond John Carter (17 September 1935 – 2 July 2020) CBE was a British Labour Party politician, who served as the Member of Parliament (MP) for Birmingham Northfield from 1970 to 1979. From 1980 to 2003, he was executive at the Marathon Oil Company, for whom he was also a director from 1983 to 2003.

== Early life and career ==
Carter was born in September 1935, the son of John Carter and Nellie Carter (née Woodcock). He was educated at Mortlake Secondary School, Reading Technical College and Stafford College of Technology, becoming an electrical engineer. From 1953 to 1955, he undertook National Service, and then worked as a technical assistant at the Sperry Gyroscope Company. In 1965, he moved to work for the Central Electricity Generating Board.

== Political career ==
Carter joined the Labour Party and served as a councillor on Easthampstead Rural District Council from 1963 to 1968. He unsuccessfully contested Wokingham at the 1966 general election, and was also unsuccessful in the 1968 Warwick and Leamington by-election. Carter was the Member of Parliament for Birmingham Northfield from 1970 to 1979, and from 1974 to 1976 served on the Western European Union and the Council of Europe. He was then a junior minister for the Northern Ireland Office until 1979. He was a member of the Public Accounts Committee from 1973 to 1974, and of the Parliamentary Science and Technology Committee from 1974 to 1976. He was the author of the Congenital Disabilities (Civil Liability) Act in 1976.

Carter unexpectedly lost his seat – which he had won by a 20% majority or 10,597 votes in the previous election – to the Conservative Jocelyn Cadbury at the 1979 general election, losing by just 204 votes (a margin of 0.3%) on a swing of 10.2%.

== Outside Parliament ==
Carter was a member of the General Advisory Council at the BBC from 1974 to 1976. He was also a member of the Interim Advisory Committee (Teachers' Pay and Conditions) for the Department of Education and Science from 1987 to 1991. From 1991 to 1993, he was Deputy Chairman of the School Teachers' Review Body. In 1991, he was awarded a CBE.

In 1983, Carter was a co-cataloguer and exhibitor on the works of Sir John Betjeman. He was also a Trustee of the British Museum (Natural History) from 1986 to 1996, and in 1991, he became a Patron for the Guild of Handicraft Trust. That year also saw him becoming a member of the Development Committee at the Arvon Foundation, a role he held until 2001. He was a Governor at Wexham and Heatherwood Hospitals NHS Trust from 2011 to 2014.

== Personal life and death ==
In 1959, he married Jeanette Hills; they had a son and two daughters. In Who's Who, he listed his recreations as "walking, reading, writing". Carter lived in Bracknell in Berkshire.

He died aged 84 in July 2020.

Parliament of the United Kingdom
| Preceded by Donald Chapman | Member of Parliament for Birmingham Northfield; 1970 – 1979 | Succeeded by Jocelyn Cadbury |
