= Jocelyn Cadbury =

British politician

Member of Parliament for Birmingham Northfield
- In office 3 May 1979 – 31 July 1982
- Preceded by: Raymond Carter
- Succeeded by: John Spellar

Personal details
- Born: Jocelyn Benedict Laurence Cadbury; 3 March 1946 Birmingham, England
- Died: 31 July 1982 (aged 36) Birmingham, England
- Cause of death: Suicide by gunshot
- Party: Conservative
- Relatives: Adrian Cadbury (brother); Dominic Cadbury (brother)
- Education: Eton College; Trinity College, Cambridge

Jocelyn Benedict Laurence Cadbury (3 March 1946 – 31 July 1982) was a British Conservative Party politician.

== Early life and education ==
Jocelyn Cadbury was born in Birmingham in 1946, the son of Laurence Cadbury and Joyce (née Mathews), and the younger brother of Adrian Cadbury and Dominic Cadbury. He was educated at Eton College and at Trinity College, Cambridge, where he graduated with a degree in Economics and Anthropology. Alongside his studies, he was a keen rower.

In 1970, he began working as an industrial relations officer at Lucas Industries in Birmingham. From 1974, he worked for Cadbury, firstly as a foreman doing shift work on the production line at the Somerdale Factory in Keynsham, and then as a production manager at Bournville.

== Political career ==
At the 1979 general election, on his second attempt, Cadbury was elected Member of Parliament for Birmingham Northfield, defeating Labour incumbent Raymond Carter. It was one of the Conservatives' best and most surprising results in that election, as a Labour majority of 10,597 was overturned into a Conservative one of 204 on a 10.2% swing.

Cadbury argued for an alternative economic strategy to help manufacturing industry. Together with other Conservative MPs, he supported a September 1981 pamphlet called "Changing Gear", which criticised the government's economic approach.

In November 1981, Cadbury was appointed as Parliamentary Private Secretary to the Minister of State for Industry, Norman Lamont.

== Death ==
On 31 July 1982, Cadbury died by suicide, shooting himself in the garden of his parents' home in Birmingham. He was 36.

Parliament of the United Kingdom
Preceded by Raymond Carter	Member of Parliament for Birmingham Northfield; 1979–1982	Succeeded by John Spellar
