= John Spellar =

British politician (born 1947)

The Right Honourable The Lord Spellar PC
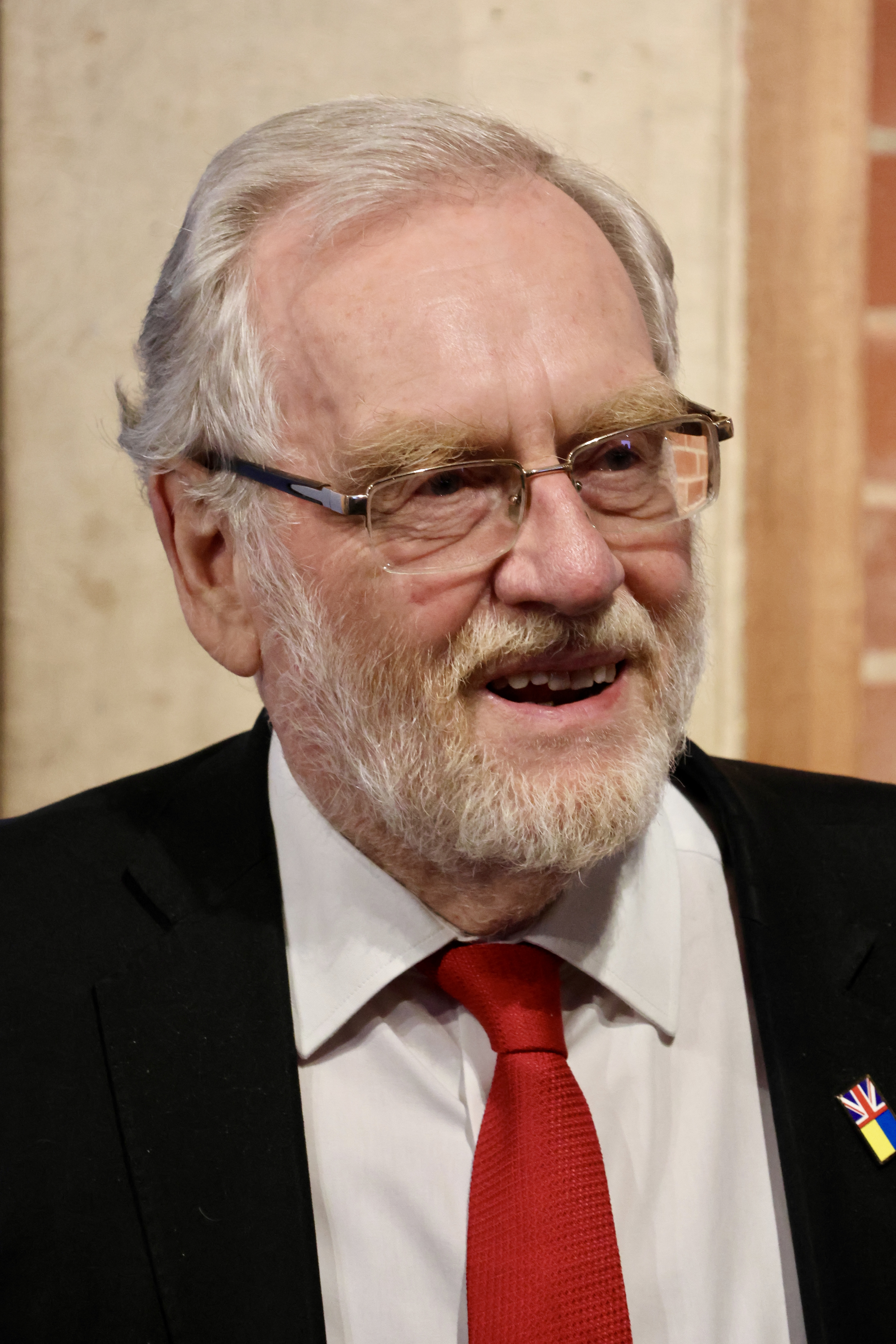
- Spellar in 2025

Shadow Minister for Foreign and Commonwealth Affairs
- In office 8 October 2010 – 18 September 2015
- Leader: Ed Miliband; Harriet Harman
- Preceded by: Chris Bryant
- Succeeded by: Catherine West

Comptroller of the Household
- In office 5 October 2008 – 11 May 2010
- Prime Minister: Gordon Brown
- Preceded by: Tommy McAvoy
- Succeeded by: Alistair Carmichael
Junior ministerial positions
Minister of State for Northern Ireland
In office 13 June 2003 – 10 May 2005
Prime Minister	Tony Blair
Preceded by	Des Browne
Succeeded by	David Hanson
Minister of State for Transport
In office 8 June 2001 – 13 June 2003
Prime Minister	Tony Blair
Preceded by	The Lord Macdonald of Tradeston
Succeeded by	Kim Howells
Minister of State for the Armed Forces
In office 29 July 1999 – 8 June 2001
Prime Minister	Tony Blair
Preceded by	Doug Henderson
Succeeded by	Adam Ingram
Parliamentary Under-Secretary of State for Defence
In office 6 May 1997 – 28 July 1999
Prime Minister	Tony Blair
Preceded by	The Earl Howe
Succeeded by	Peter Kilfoyle

Member of the House of Lords
- Lord Temporal
- Life peerage 12 August 2024

Member of Parliament
- In office 9 April 1992 – 30 May 2024
- Preceded by: Peter Archer
- Succeeded by: Constituency abolished
- Constituency: Warley West (1992–1997); Warley (1997–2024)
- In office 28 October 1982 – 13 May 1983
- Preceded by: Jocelyn Cadbury
- Succeeded by: Roger King
- Constituency: Birmingham Northfield

Personal details
- Born: John Francis Spellar; 5 August 1947 (age 79) Bromley, Kent, England
- Party: Labour
- Spouse: Anne Wilmot (m. 1981; died 2003)
- Children: 1
- Education: St Edmund Hall, Oxford
- Spellar's voice Spellar taking about Australia–United Kingdom relations Recorded 21 August 2025

John Francis Spellar, Baron Spellar (born 5 August 1947), is a British politician who served as Member of Parliament (MP) for Warley, formerly Warley West, from 1992 to 2024. A member of the Labour Party, he previously represented Birmingham Northfield from 1982 to 1983. He served as a minister in various departments between 1997 and 2005, and as Comptroller of the Household in the Whips' Office between 2008 and 2010. After Labour entered opposition, he served as a shadow Foreign Office minister from 2010 to 2015.

== Early life ==
Spellar was born in Bromley and educated at Dulwich College and St Edmund Hall, Oxford. He was Chairman of the Oxford University Labour Club in 1967.

Spellar was the Political Officer of the Electrical, Electronic, Telecommunications and Plumbing Union (EETPU) from 1969 to 1992, and was a speech-writer for general secretaries Frank Chapple and Eric Hammond. As a young union officer he attended, along with John Golding and Roger Godsiff, the St Ermin's group of senior trade union leaders who organised to prevent the Bennite left taking over the party in the years 1981–1987.

He was a councillor in the London Borough of Bromley between 1970 and 1974.

== Parliamentary career ==
Spellar stood for the constituency of Bromley at the 1970 general election as Labour's youngest candidate.

He was first elected to the House of Commons in the 1982 Birmingham Northfield by-election but lost at the 1983 general election to the Conservative candidate, Roger King. At the 1987 general election he stood again for the same seat but was again unsuccessful against King. Spellar returned to the House of Commons in the 1992 general election becoming the MP for Warley West with a majority of 5,472, and was appointed an opposition whip. Following a period as opposition spokesman for Northern Ireland in 1994, he was moved to shadow Defence minister in 1995.

At the 1997 general election, Spellar was elected as MP for the new Warley constituency, after Warley West had been abolished in a boundary review. In the new Labour government, he was appointed Parliamentary Under-Secretary of State at the Ministry of Defence, being promoted to become Minister of State for the Armed Forces in 1999. In 2001, he was appointed to the Privy Council, as Minister of State for Transport in the Department for Transport, Local Government and the Regions with rights to attend Cabinet. After the 2002 reshuffle, he became Minister of State at the Department for Transport, and moved to the Northern Ireland Office in 2003. He was banned from the offices of both the Mayor of Derry and the Mayor of Belfast during that year, because he supported the reinstatement to the British Army of convicted murderers Mark Wright and James Fisher of the Scots Guards. He left the front benches in 2005, but in 2008, he rejoined the government as a whip (Comptroller of the Household) and served until Labour entered opposition in May 2010.

In November 2015, Spellar suggested that Jeremy Corbyn should resign as Labour leader over the question of whether to conduct air strikes on ISIL in Syria. Spellar was in favour of military action, and he described Corbyn's admission that he could not personally support the air strikes as an "attempted coup" by "Corbyn and his tiny band of Trots in the bunker." Spellar supported Owen Smith in the 2016 Labour leadership election.

In November 2017, Spellar was appointed as a member of the UK parliament delegation to the NATO Parliamentary Assembly.

In March 2019, Spellar was one of 21 MPs—and the only Labour MP—to vote against LGBTQ-inclusive sex and relationships education in English schools. He defended his vote by saying that "parents have the primary responsibility for bringing up their children and they may have different views.” The co-chair of LGBT Labour Melantha Chittenden tweeted in response to his vote, saying: "Woke up to find out that one Labour MP voted against LGBT inclusive relationship and sex education and I’ve been sat here trying to work out how to explain how furious I am, but I only have one thing to say: John Spellar shame on you."

On 27 May 2024, Spellar announced he would step down at the 2024 general election, after having served as an MP for over 32 years.

=== Peerage ===
After standing down as an MP, Spellar was nominated for a life peerage in the 2024 Dissolution Honours. He was created Baron Spellar, of Smethwick in the County of the West Midlands, on 12 August 2024.

== Other political activities ==
Spellar is a vice-chair of Labour Friends of Israel. He is a Director of the Labour right wing grouping Labour First, and sits on the Advisory Council of the Henry Jackson Society, a prominent neoliberal and neoconservative foreign policy think tank. He is also a member of the Council on Geostrategy Advisory Board.

== Personal life ==
Spellar was married to dentist Anne Wilmot from 1981 until her death in 2003. They had a daughter.

Parliament of the United Kingdom
Preceded by Jocelyn Cadbury	Member of Parliament for Birmingham Northfield; 1982–1983	Succeeded by Roger King
Preceded by Peter Archer	Member of Parliament for Warley West; 1992–1997	Constituency abolished
New constituency	Member of Parliament for Warley; 1997–2024	Constituency abolished
Political offices
Preceded by Doug Henderson	Minister of State for the Armed Forces; 1999–2001	Succeeded by Adam Ingram
Preceded by Gus Macdonald	Minister of State for Transport; 2001–2003	Succeeded by Kim Howells
Preceded by Tommy McAvoy	Comptroller of the Household; 2008–2010	Succeeded by Alistair Carmichael
Orders of precedence in the United Kingdom
Preceded by The Lord Hanson of Flint	Gentlemen; Baron Spellar	Followed by The Lord Beamish
