= Roger King (politician) =

English politician (born 1943)

Roger Douglas King (born 26 October 1943) is an English Conservative Party politician who served as a member of parliament from 1983 to 1992.

== Political career ==
King first stood for Parliament at Cannock in the 1974 General Election, but he was beaten by Labour's Gwilym Roberts.

He was elected for Birmingham Northfield in the 1983 election, reversing a by-election loss to Labour the previous year. From 9 June 1983 to 15 May 1987, he served on the Transport Select Committee.

He served until the 1992 election when he himself lost the seat to Labour's Richard Burden.

== See also ==
- The Times Guide to the House of Commons, Times Newspapers Ltd, 1983 and 1992
- Leigh Rayment's Peerage Pages

Parliament of the United Kingdom
Preceded by John Spellar	Member of Parliament for Birmingham Northfield; 1983 – 1992	Succeeded by Richard Burden
