= Richard Burden =

British Labour politician (born 1954)

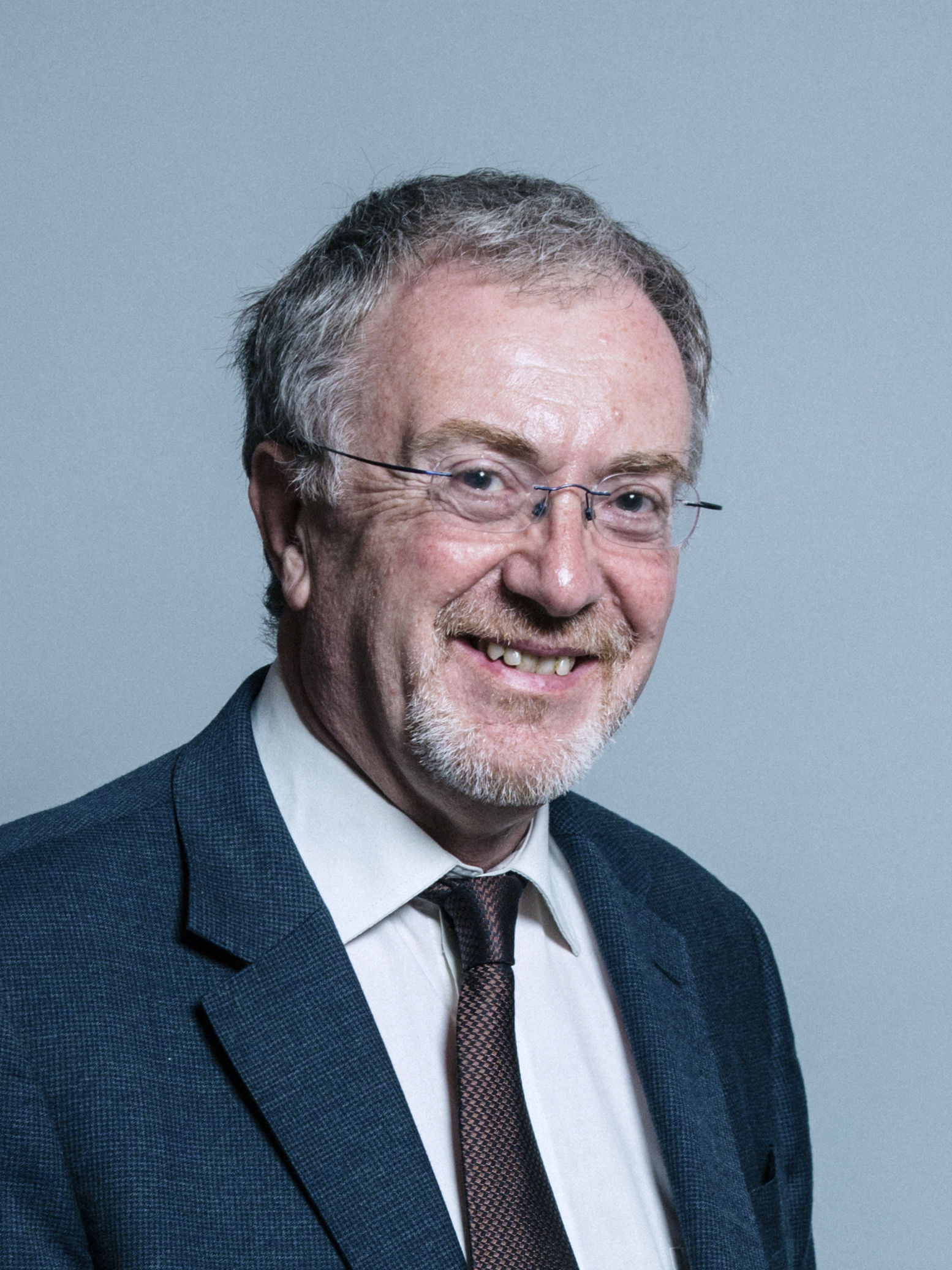
- Official portrait, 2017

Member of Parliament for Birmingham Northfield
- In office 9 April 1992 – 6 November 2019
- Preceded by: Roger King
- Succeeded by: Gary Sambrook

Chair of the West Midlands Regional Select Committee
- In office 12 March 2009 – 6 May 2010
- Preceded by: Office established
- Succeeded by: Office abolished
Shadow portfolios
2016–2017	Marine, Aviation and Roads
2013–2016	Roads and Road Safety

Personal details
- Born: 1 September 1954 (age 72) Liverpool, Lancashire, England
- Party: Labour
- Education: University of York (BA); University of Warwick (MA)

Richard Haines Burden (born 1 September 1954) is a British Labour Party politician who was the Member of Parliament (MP) for Birmingham Northfield from 1992 to 2019. He served as a Shadow Transport Minister from 2013 to 2016 and again from 2016 to 2017. After the 2017 general election, he returned to the backbenches and served as a member of the House of Commons International Development Committee.

== Early life ==
Burden was born in Liverpool. He attended the Wallasey Technical Grammar School; Bramhall Comprehensive School; St John's College of Further Education, Manchester; the University of York, where he obtained a degree in Politics and was the president of the Students' Union in 1976; and then the University of Warwick where he received a master's degree in Industrial Relations.

On leaving university he was appointed the branch organiser in North Yorkshire in the National and Local Government Officers' Association in 1979, becoming the district officer for the West Midlands in 1981, a position he held until his election to Westminster. He is a member of the Transport and General Workers Union which he joined in 1979.

== Political career ==
=== Entering Parliament ===
He contested the parliamentary seat of Meriden at the 1987 general election, where he was defeated by the sitting Conservative MP Iain Mills by a margin of 16,820. He was then selected to fight the Conservative-held marginal seat of Birmingham Northfield at the 1992 general election. Burden defeated the sitting Tory MP Roger King by just 630 votes and became a Labour MP. He made his maiden speech on 19 May 1992.

After Labour formed the government following the 1997 general election, Burden was appointed the Parliamentary Private Secretary (PPS) to the Minister of State at the Ministry of Agriculture, Fisheries and Food and fellow Birmingham MP Jeff Rooker, and he remained Rooker's PPS when he became the Minister of State at the Department of Social Security.

=== On the Backbenches ===
Following the 2001 general election Burden became a member of the Trade and Industry Select Committee, and after the 2005 election moved to the International Development Committee.

His Birmingham Northfield constituency was long dominated by the local car manufacturer MG Rover, which went into administration after negotiations with Chinese car manufacturer Shanghai Automotive failed in April 2005. The site has since been sold to Chinese car company Nanjing Automotive.

He was present at the meeting in Birmingham with the Labour government's leaders Tony Blair and Gordon Brown along with Tony Woodley on 8 April 2005 when the future of MG Rover was decided. The Labour government decided not to give further support to MG Rover and consequently the company entered into administrative receivership, with 6,500 employees being made redundant in addition to many other employees of its car dealerships and component suppliers in the United Kingdom. Burden, as the MP for Northfield which included Longbridge, raised the issue in Parliament from time to time, in relation to the local economy, jobs and skills.

Burden voted against his own Labour government on a few occasions, most notably on the invasion of Iraq in 2003 and the 2005 anti-terror bill, which included a provision to hold terrorist suspects for 90 days without trial.

He was re-elected at the May 2010 general election. He was not invited to Chinese Premier Wen Jiabao's visit to Longbridge in June 2011 and complained bitterly to the local press at being excluded; it is not known why he was 'excluded', when other leading local politicians were invited, though he suggested it was a decision made by the then-Conservative-run City Council.

Together with his friend and fellow ex-Young Liberal Peter Hain MP, he was an enthusiastic supporter of the unsuccessful Alternative Vote system in the May 2011 referendum.

=== Frontbench ===
Burden became Shadow Transport Minister under Ed Miliband in 2013, with responsibility for roads and road safety, motor agencies, cycling and future transport.

He retained a Shadow Ministerial role under Jeremy Corbyn after he was elected as party leader in 2015. Burden resigned from this position following a vote of no confidence in Corbyn by members of the Parliamentary party, telling Corbyn he was "making a bad situation worse" by choosing to remain Labour leader. He supported Owen Smith in the failed attempt to replace Corbyn in the 2016 Labour leadership election. He rejoined the frontbench as Shadow Transport Minister in October 2016, with responsibility for aviation, maritime, roads and future transport. He stayed in this post until the 2017 general election, after which he stood down from the frontbench to join the International Development Committee.

In the 2016 United Kingdom referendum on membership of the European Union he supported Remain; however, the majority of his constituents in Birmingham Northfield voted Leave (61.8% Leave, 38.2% Remain, with all 4 wards in the constituency voting Leave).

In the United Kingdom general election held on 12 December 2019, he stood for re-election and was one of the many Labour MPs to be defeated, losing his seat to the Conservative candidate, Gary Sambrook, who won by a majority of 1,640 votes; Burden received 18,317 votes to Sambrook's 19,957 votes.

=== Interests ===
Burden was Chair of the Palestine All Party Parliamentary Group and frequently asked questions of ministers on issues relating to the Middle East conflict. He was one of the most prominent parliamentary critics of Israeli policy in the region, particularly with regard to its expansion of settlements in the West Bank. He was also Chair of the All-Party Parliamentary Motor Group.

He speaks French and is an avid motorsport fan. In 2002 he became the special advisor to the Minister of Sport, Richard Caborn, on motorsport.

Parliament of the United Kingdom
Preceded by Roger King	Member of Parliament for Birmingham Northfield; 1992–2019	Succeeded by Gary Sambrook
