= Warley East =

UK Parliament constituency (1974–1997)

- Former borough constituency for the House of Commons
- County: West Midlands

1974–1997
- Seats: One
- Created from: Smethwick
- Replaced by: Warley

Warley East was a parliamentary constituency in the borough of Sandwell in the West Midlands of England.

It returned one Member of Parliament (MP) to the House of Commons of the Parliament of the United Kingdom. It was created for the February 1974 general election, and abolished for the 1997 general election, when it was largely replaced by the new Warley constituency.

The largest town in the constituency was Smethwick.

== History ==
The constituency's only MP for its 23-year existence was the actor Andrew Faulds, previously Labour MP for the former constituency of Smethwick since 1966.

== Boundaries ==
1974–1983: The County Borough of Warley wards of Abbey, Bearwood, Brandhall, Bristnall, Sandwell, Soho, Uplands, and Victoria.

1983–1997: The Metropolitan Borough of Sandwell wards of Abbey, Bristnall, Old Warley, St Paul's, Smethwick, and Soho and Victoria.

== Members of Parliament ==
Election	Member	Party
Feb 1974	Andrew Faulds	Labour
1997	constituency abolished: see Warley	

== Elections ==
=== Elections in the 1970s ===
February 1974 general election: Warley East
Party	Candidate	Votes	%	±%
Labour	Andrew Faulds	24,789	59.02	
Conservative	Susan Lewis-Smith	17,209	40.98	
Majority		7,571	18.04	
Turnout		41,998	73.59	
Labour win (new seat)				

October 1974 general election: Warley East
Party	Candidate	Votes	%	±%
Labour	Andrew Faulds	21,065	54.55	
Conservative	P Holliday	12,888	33.37	
Liberal	Rodney Smith	4,664	12.08	New
Majority		8,177	21.18	
Turnout		38,617	67.12	
Labour hold		Swing		

1979 general election: Warley East
Party	Candidate	Votes	%	±%
Labour	Andrew Faulds	21,333	55.02	
Conservative	RK Jones	16,236	41.87	
National Front	J Worrall	1,204	3.11	New
Majority		5,097	13.15	
Turnout		38,773	70.46	
Labour hold		Swing		

=== Elections in the 1980s ===
1983 general election: Warley East
Party	Candidate	Votes	%	±%
Labour	Andrew Faulds	18,036	45.55	
Conservative	Michael Whitby	14,645	36.99	
SDP	Bryn Hamer	6,697	16.91	New
Communist	HS Randhawa	217	0.55	New
Majority		3,391	8.56	
Turnout		39,595	68.93	
Labour hold		Swing		

1987 general election: Warley East
Party	Candidate	Votes	%	±%
Labour	Andrew Faulds	19,428	50.24	
Conservative	Anthony Antoniou	13,843	35.80	
SDP	Jonathan J. Jordan	5,396	13.96	
Majority		5,585	14.44	
Turnout		38,667	69.41	
Labour hold		Swing		

=== Elections in the 1990s ===
1992 general election: Warley East
Party	Candidate	Votes	%	±%
Labour	Andrew Faulds	19,891	53.6	+3.4
Conservative	Giles Marshall	12,097	32.6	−3.2
Liberal Democrats	Alan R.A. Harrod	4,547	12.3	−1.7
Natural Law	Alan T. Groucutt	561	1.5	New
Majority		7,794	21.0	+6.6
Turnout		37,096	71.7	+2.3
Labour hold		Swing	+3.3	
