= Palestine All Party Parliamentary Group =

UK parliamentary group

Palestine All Party Parliamentary Group is a bipartisan All-Party Parliamentary Group of Members of Parliament in the Parliament of the United Kingdom. The group's Chairperson is Julie Elliott. Its declared purpose is "To foster good relations and understanding between Britain and Palestine and to promote a just and lasting peace in the Middle East".

== Meeting with Hamas ==
Members of the PAPPG met with high-ranking Hamas officials in Ramallah, the West Bank, on 31 January 2007. The PAPPG meeting with Hamas followed in the precedents of the European Union's contacts with Hamas as well as Russia's and Germany's, and preceded Turkey's official contacts with Hamas.

The Independent wrote that following the meeting the PAPPG issued a report that "said that the international embargo had stripped Hamas of any real accountability for its performance to the Palestinian people, caused widespread misery and hardship among Palestinians, and forced the Hamas government to look elsewhere for support, including Iran."

The group planned to meet with Palestinian Foreign Minister and Hamas official Mahmoud Zahar and Prime Minister Ismail Haniyeh but were unable to because of factional violence.

== Press release ==
In a press release issued in April 2004, Burden called United States President George W. Bush's support for Israeli settlement expansion in the Palestinian territories which it occupied in 1967 an endorsement of "flagrant flouting of international law by Israel. Against this background, President Bush's claim that he still wishes to foster meaningful negotiations between the parties in accordance with the Road Map is meaningless twaddle."
