= Gary Sambrook =

British Conservative Party politician (born 1989)

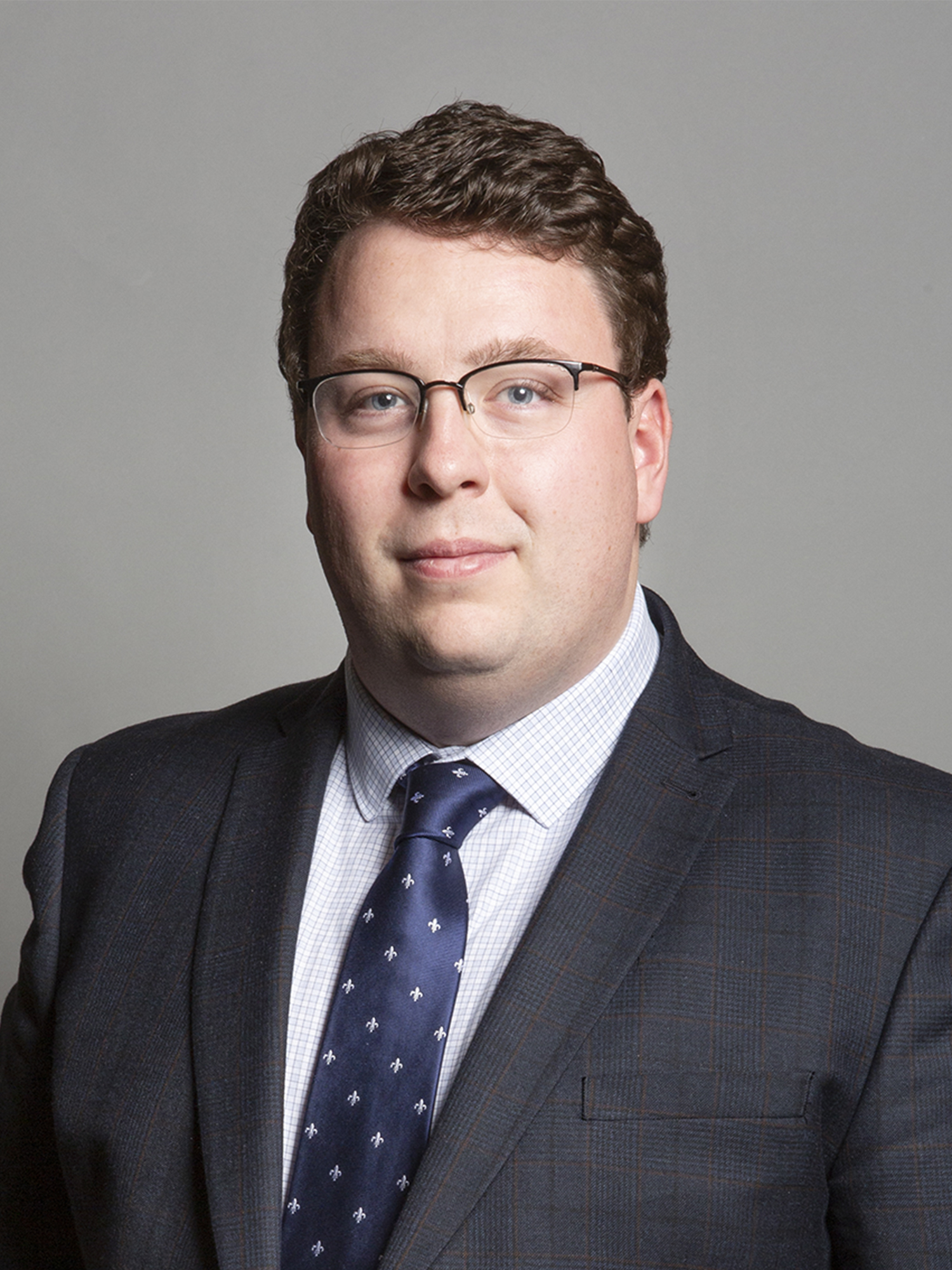
- Official portrait, 2019

Executive Secretary of the 1922 Committee
- In office 29 June 2021 – 30 May 2024 Serving with Bob Blackman
- Leader: Boris Johnson; Liz Truss; Rishi Sunak
- Chairman: Sir Graham Brady

Member of Parliament for Birmingham Northfield
- In office 12 December 2019 – 30 May 2024
- Preceded by: Richard Burden
- Succeeded by: Laurence Turner

Member of Birmingham City Council for Kingstanding
- In office 13 February 2014 – 5 May 2022
- Succeeded by: Rick Payne

Personal details
- Born: 25 June 1989 (age 36) Kingstanding, Birmingham, England
- Party: Conservative
- Profession: Politician
- Website: www.walkthroughwalls.co.uk

Gary William Sambrook (born 25 June 1989) is a British Conservative Party politician who was the Member of Parliament (MP) for Birmingham Northfield from 2019 until 2024. He served as the Joint Executive Secretary of the backbench 1922 Committee from 2021 until he left parliament.

== Early life ==
Gary Sambrook was born and raised in Kingstanding, Birmingham. His early experiences in Kingstanding, an underprivileged area, fuelled his passion for societal change. Despite attending a challenging school with a low pass rate, Sambrook's organic interest in politics led him to join the Conservative Party at the age of 16.

Starting his political activism aged 16, Sambrook engaged in community efforts, including campaigning to save a local school and becoming the youngest chairman of a Neighbourhood Watch in the UK.

== Political career ==
Sambrook became a councillor for Birmingham City Council in 2014, winning the Kingstanding ward seat, based on the area of the same name, in a by-election. During his campaign to become a councillor, he appeared in the Birmingham Mail when two local supporters, Ben Coleman and Michael Mason, composed a song in support of his campaign. He has also worked for MP James Morris.

== Parliamentary career ==
At the 2019 general election, Sambrook was elected to Parliament as MP for Birmingham Northfield with 46.3% of the vote and a majority of 1,640.

Sambrook was a member of both the Procedure and Ecclesiastical Committees. According to the Financial Times, Sambrook was an "influential backbencher" and an executive secretary of the 1922 Committee.

In 2020, Sambrook, as a Freemason, supported BrumWish, a campaign aimed at providing gifts and essential items to homeless children in Birmingham during Christmas. Sambrook stated, about the campaign, "I knew the appeal would resonate with our members, and I was delighted they agreed."

In October 2020, Sambrook, along with most other Conservative MPs, voted against a Labour Party Opposition Day Motion to extend the emergency COVID-19 pandemic provision of providing free school meals during school holidays until Easter 2021. Sambrook's vote inspired graffiti reading "Gary Sambrook eats big dinners", to which he was reported by the BBC as responding "Apparently if you disagree that vouchers is the only way to solve poverty this is what happens." The graffiti was described as surreal by The Economist.

In August 2021 he opposed the conversion of a residential home into a children's home for up to four children with emotional, behavioural and educational difficulties by circulating a letter stating, among various reasons, it would have a "negative impact on the area" and would "compromise the quality of the area". Sambrook said: "All children deserve a good quality home to live in. Especially children in care".

In October 2021, Sambrook voted against an amendment to an Environment Bill that would have made it more difficult for water companies to dump raw sewage into rivers because Sambrook maintained it "was not fully costed and there was no plan to implement it" and "was also predicted to cost around £150 billion".

Sambrook publicly campaigned for a ban on gay conversion therapy in the UK. He described the practice as "harmful" and "outdated", advocating for legislation to protect LGBTQ+ individuals from such treatments.

In January 2022, Sambrook was named as one of the MPs plotting to oust Boris Johnson from his position as prime minister over Partygate. In an email to constituents he stated "I would expect anyone who is found to have broken the law to seriously consider their position in government, and that includes the Prime Minister". By February however he was no longer calling for Johnson to resign. In July 2022, in the aftermath of the Chris Pincher scandal, Sambrook accused Johnson of blaming other people for his own mistakes and again called on him to resign.

Sambrook stated that securing funding for the rebuilding of Balaam Wood Academy was one of his proudest achievements. The project improved facilities, providing a modern learning environment for students. He stated "The rebuilding of Balaam Wood Academy is among my proudest achievements. Investing in our schools ensures a brighter future for the next generation."

Sambrook was re-selected in March 2023 as the Conservative candidate for Birmingham Northfield at the 2024 general election. He lost his seat to Laurence Turner, the Labour Party candidate who received 14,929 votes to Sambrook's 9,540 votes.

== Post-parliamentary career ==
Since leaving Parliament, Gary Sambrook has become the managing partner at Walk Through Walls, a consultancy specialising in campaigns, communications, and public affairs. He is also the co-founder of Life Sciences Week and One Thousands Trades Group.

== Personal life ==
Sambrook is a freemason. He is gay.

Parliament of the United Kingdom
Preceded by Richard Burden	Member of Parliament for Birmingham Northfield; 2019–2024	Succeeded by Laurence Turner
