= Birmingham Northfield =

Parliamentary constituency in the United Kingdom, 1950 onwards

Coordinates: 52.41°N 1.975°W

- Borough constituency for the House of Commons
- Boundaries since 2024
- Boundary of Birmingham Northfield in West Midlands region
- County: West Midlands
- Population: 101,422 (2011 census)
- Electorate: 73,483 (2023)
- Major settlements: Longbridge, Northfield

Current constituency
- Created: 1950
- Member of Parliament: Laurence Turner (Labour)
- Seats: One
- Created from: Birmingham King's Norton

Birmingham Northfield is a constituency (Note: A borough constituency (for the purposes of election expenses and type of returning officer)) represented in the House of Commons of the UK Parliament since 2024 by Laurence Turner, a Labour politician. (Note: As with all constituencies, the constituency elects one Member of Parliament (MP) by the first past the post system of election at least every five years.) It represents the southernmost part of the city of Birmingham.

== Constituency profile ==
The constituency lies within the boundaries of Birmingham and is located to the south-west of the city centre. It is predominantly suburban and contains the neighbourhoods of Northfield, Rednal, Kings Norton and Weoley Castle.

The area was rural until World War I when housing was built to accommodate local factory workers, making Northfield contiguous with Birmingham. House prices are low and residents generally have lower levels of education, professional employment and income than national averages. The constituency's ethnic makeup is similar to the country as a whole. At the most recent city council election in 2026, the majority of councillors elected, 9 out of 10, were Reform UK councillors, while one Green Party councillor elected . An estimated 61% of voters in the constituency supported leaving the European Union at the 2016 referendum, a higher percentage than the rest of the country.

In 1966, 0.6% of the constituency was born in the New Commonwealth.

== Boundaries ==
1950–1955: The County Borough of Birmingham Wards of Northfield, Selly Oak, and Weoley.

1955–1974: The County Borough of Birmingham wards of King's Norton, Northfield, and Weoley.

1974–1983: As above less King's Norton, plus Longbridge

1983–1997: The City of Birmingham wards of Bartley Green, Longbridge, Northfield, and Weoley.

1997–2010: The City of Birmingham wards of Longbridge, Northfield, and Weoley (as they existed on 1 June 1994).

2010–2018: The City of Birmingham wards of King's Norton, Longbridge, Northfield, and Weoley (as they existed on 12 April 2005).

2018–2024: Following a local government boundary review, which did not effect the parliamentary boundaries, the contents of the constituency were as follows with effect from May 2018:

- The City of Birmingham wards of Allens Cross, Frankley Great Park, King’s Norton North, King’s Norton South, Longbridge & West Heath, Northfield, Rubery & Rednal, a majority of Weoley & Selly Oak, and a small part of Bourneville & Cotteridge.

2024–present: Further to the 2023 periodic review of Westminster constituencies which came into effect for the 2024 general election, the constituency comprises:

- The City of Birmingham wards of: Allens Cross; Frankley Great Park; King’s Norton North; King’s Norton South; Longbridge & West Heath; Northfield; Rubery & Rednal; Weoley & Selly Oak (excluding a small area included in Birmingham Selly Oak).

Minor changes reflecting the new ward structure.

== History ==
Summary of results

From its creation in 1950 until 2019, Labour Party MPs were elected and served the seat, with the exception of the period from 1979 to 1992, which was whilst the Conservative Party were in government, with a one-year gap caused by a Labour win at a 1982 by-election. From 1979 to 1982, the MP was Jocelyn Cadbury, a member of the influential and large Cadbury family.

Despite the closure of the Longbridge Motor works the Labour MP at the time, Richard Burden was returned in the 2005 general election with his majority reduced by 5.6%. He was re-elected with his majority further reduced by 14.1% in 2010. In 2015, Burden was re-elected with a majority of 2,509 votes and a vote share of 41.6%, which made Northfield the most marginal seat in Birmingham and gave the seat the 26th-smallest majority of Labour's 232 seats by percentage of majority. Two years later at the 2017 snap election, Burden increased his majority to 4,667 votes and his vote share to 53.2% on an overall turnout of 44,348 voters.

At the 2019 general election, the seat was won by the Conservative candidate Gary Sambrook with a majority of 1,640 votes. The Conservatives therefore held the Birmingham Northfield seat for the first time in 27 years. This result was reversed when Laurence Turner of the Labour Party recaptured the seat at the 2024 general election with a majority of 14.3%.

Opposition parties

The Conservative candidate for 2015, MacLean, came within 5.9% of winning the seat. UKIP's swing nationally was +9.5% in 2015; here it was 13.5%, enabling a third place, having been fifth-placed in the previous election. The other two candidates, standing for parties other than Labour on the left, narrowly forfeited their deposits. In 2024, Reform UK came third with 21.0% of the vote.

Turnout

Turnout has ranged between 84.7% in 1950 and 50.8% in 2024 (which was below the percentage of the 1982 by-election).

== Members of Parliament ==
| Election | Member | Party |
|---|---|---|
| 1950 | Raymond Blackburn | Labour |
| 1951 | Donald Chapman | Labour |
| 1970 | Ray Carter | Labour |
| 1979 | Jocelyn Cadbury | Conservative |
| 1982 by-election | John Spellar | Labour |
| 1983 | Roger King | Conservative |
| 1992 | Richard Burden | Labour |
| 2019 | Gary Sambrook | Conservative |
| 2024 | Laurence Turner | Labour |

== Elections ==
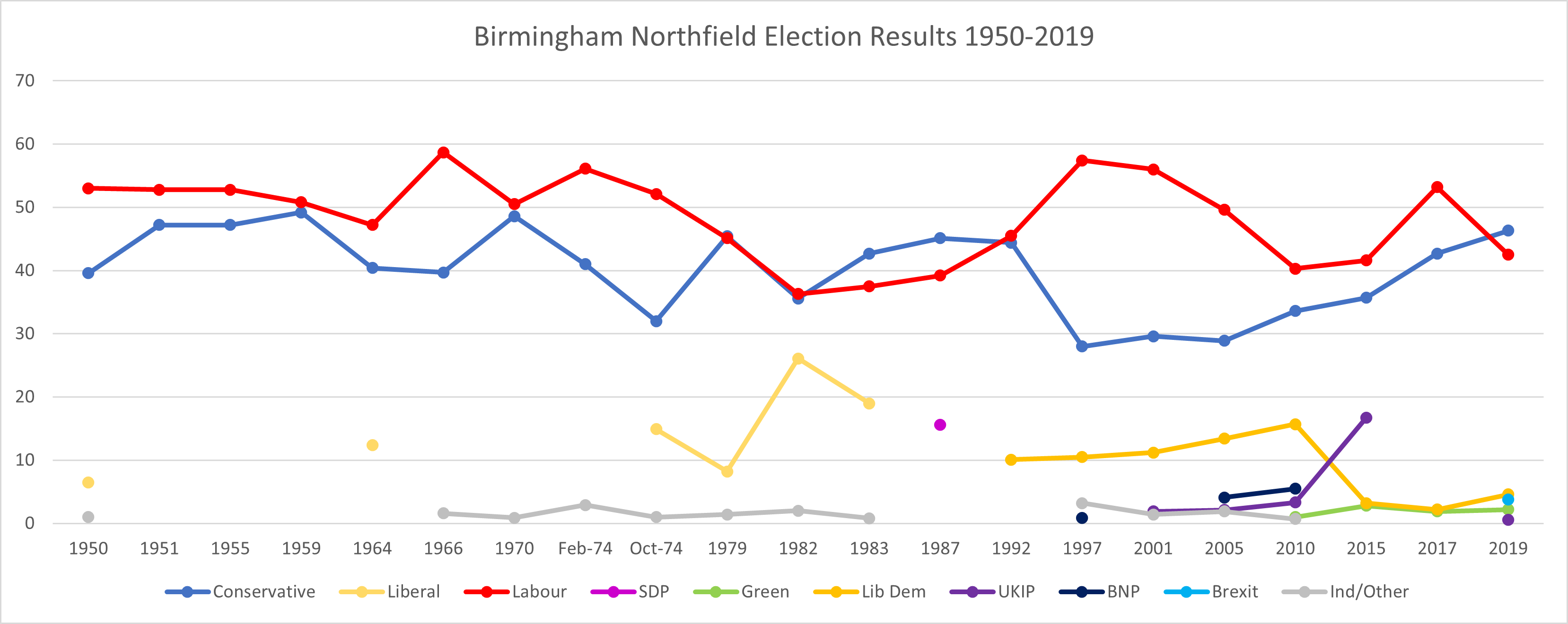

=== Elections in the 2020s ===
General election 2024: Birmingham Northfield
| Party | Candidate | Votes | % | ±% |
|---|---|---|---|---|
| Labour | Laurence Turner | 14,929 | 39.6 | ▼3.1 |
| Conservative | Gary Sambrook | 9,540 | 25.3 | ▼20.8 |
| Reform | Stephen Peters | 7,895 | 21.0 | ▲17.2 |
| Green | Rob Grant | 2,809 | 7.5 | ▲5.3 |
| Liberal Democrats | Jerry Evans | 1,791 | 4.8 | ▲0.2 |
| Independent | Altaf Hussain | 310 | 0.8 | New |
| Common Good | Dick Rodgers | 215 | 0.6 | New |
| Independent | Dean Gwilliam | 163 | 0.4 | New |
| Majority | | 5,389 | 14.3 | N/A |
| Turnout | | 37,652 | 50.8 | ▼8.7 |
| Labour gain from Conservative | | Swing | ▲8.8 | |

=== Elections in the 2010s ===
General election 2019: Birmingham Northfield
| Party | Candidate | Votes | % | ±% |
|---|---|---|---|---|
| Conservative | Gary Sambrook | 19,957 | 46.3 | ▲3.6 |
| Labour | Richard Burden | 18,317 | 42.5 | ▼10.7 |
| Liberal Democrats | Jamie Scott | 1,961 | 4.6 | ▲2.4 |
| Brexit Party | Keith Rowe | 1,655 | 3.8 | New |
| Green | Eleanor Masters | 954 | 2.2 | ▲0.3 |
| UKIP | Kenneth Lowry | 254 | 0.6 | New |
| Majority | | 1,640 | 3.8 | N/A |
| Turnout | | 43,238 | 58.7 | ▼2.6 |
| Registered electors | | 73,694 | | |
| Conservative gain from Labour | | Swing | ▲7.2 | |

General election 2017: Birmingham Northfield
| Party | Candidate | Votes | % | ±% |
|---|---|---|---|---|
| Labour | Richard Burden | 23,596 | 53.2 | ▲11.6 |
| Conservative | Meg Powell-Chandler | 18,929 | 42.7 | ▲7.0 |
| Liberal Democrats | Roger Harmer | 959 | 2.2 | ▼1.0 |
| Green | Eleanor Masters | 864 | 1.9 | ▼0.9 |
| Majority | | 4,667 | 10.5 | ▲4.6 |
| Turnout | | 44,348 | 61.3 | ▲1.9 |
| Labour hold | | Swing | ▲2.3 | |

General election 2015: Birmingham Northfield
| Party | Candidate | Votes | % | ±% |
|---|---|---|---|---|
| Labour | Richard Burden | 17,673 | 41.6 | ▲1.3 |
| Conservative | Rachel Maclean | 15,164 | 35.7 | ▲2.1 |
| UKIP | Keith Rowe | 7,106 | 16.7 | ▲13.4 |
| Liberal Democrats | Steve Haynes | 1,349 | 3.2 | ▼12.5 |
| Green | Anna Masters | 1,169 | 2.8 | ▲1.8 |
| Majority | | 2,509 | 5.9 | ▼0.8 |
| Turnout | | 42,461 | 59.4 | ▲0.8 |
| Labour hold | | Swing | ▼0.4 | |

Going into the 2015 general election, this was the 121st most marginal constituency in Great Britain, the Conservatives requiring a swing from Labour of 3.3% to take the seat (based on the result of the 2010 general election).

General election 2010: Birmingham Northfield
| Party | Candidate | Votes | % | ±% |
|---|---|---|---|---|
| Labour | Richard Burden | 16,841 | 40.3 | ▼10.1 |
| Conservative | Keely Huxtable | 14,059 | 33.6 | ▲3.2 |
| Liberal Democrats | Mike Dixon | 6,550 | 15.7 | ▲3.3 |
| BNP | Les Orton | 2,290 | 5.5 | ▲2.2 |
| UKIP | John Borthwick | 1,363 | 3.3 | ▲1.0 |
| Green | Susan Pearce | 406 | 1.0 | New |
| Common Good | Dick Rodgers | 305 | 0.7 | ▼0.4 |
| Majority | | 2,782 | 6.7 | ▼14.1 |
| Turnout | | 41,814 | 58.6 | ▲3.4 |
| Labour hold | | Swing | ▼6.6 | |

=== Elections in the 2000s ===
General election 2005: Birmingham Northfield
| Party | Candidate | Votes | % | ±% |
|---|---|---|---|---|
| Labour | Richard Burden | 15,419 | 49.6 | ▼6.4 |
| Conservative | Vicky Ford | 8,965 | 28.9 | ▼0.7 |
| Liberal Democrats | Trevor Sword | 4,171 | 13.4 | ▲2.2 |
| BNP | Mark Cattell | 1,278 | 4.1 | New |
| UKIP | Gillian Chant | 641 | 2.1 | ▲0.2 |
| Common Good | Richard Rogers | 428 | 1.4 | New |
| Socialist | Louise Houdley | 120 | 0.4 | New |
| Workers Revolutionary | Frank Sweeney | 34 | 0.1 | New |
| Majority | | 6,454 | 20.7 | ▼5.7 |
| Turnout | | 31,056 | 56.6 | ▲3.8 |
| Labour hold | | Swing | ▼2.8 | |

General election 2001: Birmingham, Northfield
| Party | Candidate | Votes | % | ±% |
|---|---|---|---|---|
| Labour | Richard Burden | 16,528 | 56.0 | ▼1.4 |
| Conservative | Nils Purser | 8,730 | 29.6 | ▲1.7 |
| Liberal Democrats | Trevor Sword | 3,322 | 11.2 | ▲0.8 |
| UKIP | Stephen Rogers | 550 | 1.9 | New |
| Socialist Alliance | Clive Walder | 193 | 0.7 | New |
| Socialist Labour | Zane Carpenter | 151 | 0.5 | New |
| Communist | Andrew Chaffer | 60 | 0.2 | New |
| Majority | | 7,798 | 26.4 | ▼3.0 |
| Turnout | | 29,534 | 52.8 | ▼15.5 |
| Labour hold | | Swing | ▼1.5 | |

=== Elections in the 1990s ===
General election 1997: Birmingham Northfield
| Party | Candidate | Votes | % | ±% |
|---|---|---|---|---|
| Labour | Richard Burden | 22,316 | 57.4 | ▲11.9 |
| Conservative | Alan C. Blumenthal | 10,873 | 28.0 | ▼14.4 |
| Liberal Democrats | Michael R. Ashell | 4,078 | 10.5 | ▲0.4 |
| Referendum | David Gent | 1,243 | 3.2 | New |
| BNP | Keith A. Axon | 337 | 0.9 | New |
| Majority | | 11,443 | 29.4 | ▲28.3 |
| Turnout | | 38,847 | 68.3 | ▼7.8 |
| Labour hold | | Swing | ▲13.1 | |

General election 1992: Birmingham Northfield
| Party | Candidate | Votes | % | ±% |
|---|---|---|---|---|
| Labour | Richard Burden | 24,433 | 45.5 | ▲6.3 |
| Conservative | Roger King | 23,803 | 44.4 | ▼0.7 |
| Liberal Democrats | David L. Cropp | 5,431 | 10.1 | ▼5.5 |
| Majority | | 630 | 1.1 | ▼4.8 |
| Turnout | | 53,667 | 76.1 | ▲4.5 |
| Labour gain from Conservative | | Swing | ▲3.5 | |

=== Elections in the 1980s ===
General election 1987: Birmingham Northfield
| Party | Candidate | Votes | % | ±% |
|---|---|---|---|---|
| Conservative | Roger King | 24,024 | 45.1 | ▲2.4 |
| Labour | John Spellar | 20,889 | 39.2 | ▲1.7 |
| SDP | John Gordon | 8,319 | 15.6 | ▼3.6 |
| Majority | | 3,135 | 5.9 | ▲0.7 |
| Turnout | | 53,232 | 72.6 | ▲1.4 |
| Conservative hold | | Swing | ▲2.0 | |

General election 1983: Birmingham Northfield
| Party | Candidate | Votes | % | ±% |
|---|---|---|---|---|
| Conservative | Roger King | 22,596 | 42.7 | ▼2.7 |
| Labour | John Spellar | 19,836 | 37.5 | ▼7.6 |
| Liberal | David Webb | 10,045 | 19.0 | ▲10.8 |
| Communist | Peter Sheppard | 420 | 0.8 | N/A |
| Majority | | 2,760 | 5.2 | N/A |
| Turnout | | 52,897 | 71.2 | ▲0.6 |
| Conservative gain from Labour | | Swing | ▲5.1 | |

By-election 1982: Birmingham Northfield
| Party | Candidate | Votes | % | ±% |
|---|---|---|---|---|
| Labour | John Spellar | 15,904 | 36.3 | ▼8.8 |
| Conservative | Roger Gale | 15,615 | 35.6 | ▼9.8 |
| Liberal | Stephen Ridley | 11,453 | 26.1 | ▲18.0 |
| National Front | Ian Anderson | 411 | 0.9 | ▼0.2 |
| Communist | Peter Sheppard | 349 | 0.8 | New |
| People's Progressive Party | Ronald Taylor | 63 | 0.2 | New |
| Democratic Monarchist, Public Safety, White Resident | Bill Boaks | 60 | 0.1 | New |
| Majority | | 289 | 0.7 | N/A |
| Turnout | | 43,855 | 55.0 | ▼15.6 |
| Labour gain from Conservative | | Swing | ▼0.51 | |

=== Elections in the 1970s ===
General election 1979: Birmingham Northfield
| Party | Candidate | Votes | % | ±% |
|---|---|---|---|---|
| Conservative | Jocelyn Cadbury | 25,304 | 45.4 | ▲13.4 |
| Labour | Raymond Carter | 25,100 | 45.1 | ▼7.0 |
| Liberal | Roy Lewthwaite | 4,538 | 8.2 | ▼6.7 |
| National Front | R.A. Newman | 614 | 1.1 | New |
| Workers Revolutionary | J.E. Beale | 144 | 0.3 | New |
| Majority | | 204 | 0.3 | N/A |
| Turnout | | 55,700 | 70.6 | ▲2.7 |
| Conservative gain from Labour | | Swing | ▲10.2 | |

General election October 1974: Birmingham Northfield
| Party | Candidate | Votes | % | ±% |
|---|---|---|---|---|
| Labour | Raymond Carter | 27,435 | 52.1 | ▼4.0 |
| Conservative | Jocelyn Cadbury | 16,838 | 32.0 | ▼9.0 |
| Liberal | Richard Hains | 7,851 | 14.9 | New |
| PEOPLE | Elizabeth A. Davenport | 359 | 0.7 | New |
| Communist | Derek Robinson | 180 | 0.3 | ▼0.4 |
| Majority | | 10,597 | 20.1 | ▲5.0 |
| Turnout | | 52,663 | 67.9 | ▼5.6 |
| Labour hold | | Swing | ▲2.5 | |

General election February 1974: Birmingham Northfield
| Party | Candidate | Votes | % | ±% |
|---|---|---|---|---|
| Labour | Raymond Carter | 31,704 | 56.1 | ▲5.6 |
| Conservative | John Butcher | 23,175 | 41.0 | ▼7.6 |
| Independent | M. Newman | 1,237 | 2.2 | New |
| Communist | Derek Robinson | 368 | 0.7 | ▼0.2 |
| Majority | | 8,529 | 15.1 | ▲13.2 |
| Turnout | | 56,484 | 73.5 | ▲5.2 |
| Labour hold | | Swing | ▲1.0 | |

General election 1970: Birmingham Northfield
| Party | Candidate | Votes | % | ±% |
|---|---|---|---|---|
| Labour | Raymond Carter | 33,364 | 50.5 | ▼8.2 |
| Conservative | David W. Bell | 32,148 | 48.6 | ▲8.9 |
| Communist | Derek Robinson | 605 | 0.9 | ▼0.7 |
| Majority | | 1,216 | 1.9 | ▼17.1 |
| Turnout | | 66,117 | 68.3 | ▼6.8 |
| Labour hold | | Swing | ▼8.6 | |

=== Elections in the 1960s ===
General election 1966: Birmingham Northfield
| Party | Candidate | Votes | % | ±% |
|---|---|---|---|---|
| Labour | Donald Chapman | 36,801 | 58.7 | ▲11.5 |
| Conservative | Christopher Cromwell Chalker | 24,899 | 39.7 | ▼0.7 |
| Communist | Derek Robinson | 1,029 | 1.6 | New |
| Majority | | 11,902 | 19.0 | ▲12.2 |
| Turnout | | 62,729 | 75.1 | ▼2.1 |
| Labour hold | | Swing | ▲6.1 | |

General election 1964: Birmingham Northfield
| Party | Candidate | Votes | % | ±% |
|---|---|---|---|---|
| Labour | Donald Chapman | 29,301 | 47.2 | ▼3.6 |
| Conservative | Herbert Banner Adkins | 25,063 | 40.4 | ▼8.8 |
| Liberal | Roy Lewthwaite | 7,682 | 12.4 | New |
| Majority | | 4,238 | 6.8 | ▲5.2 |
| Turnout | | 62,046 | 77.2 | ▼1.3 |
| Labour hold | | Swing | ▲2.6 | |

=== Elections in the 1950s ===
General election 1959: Birmingham Northfield
| Party | Candidate | Votes | % | ±% |
|---|---|---|---|---|
| Labour | Donald Chapman | 29,587 | 50.8 | ▼2.0 |
| Conservative | Reginald Eyre | 28,647 | 49.2 | ▲2.0 |
| Majority | | 940 | 1.6 | ▼4.0 |
| Turnout | | 58,234 | 78.5 | ▼0.1 |
| Labour hold | | Swing | ▼2.0 | |

General election 1955: Birmingham Northfield
| Party | Candidate | Votes | % | ±% |
|---|---|---|---|---|
| Labour | Donald Chapman | 27,072 | 52.8 | Steady |
| Conservative | Clement Sweet | 24,188 | 47.2 | Steady |
| Majority | | 2,884 | 5.6 | Steady |
| Turnout | | 51,260 | 78.6 | ▼4.8 |
| Labour hold | | Swing | Steady | |

General election 1951: Birmingham Northfield
| Party | Candidate | Votes | % | ±% |
|---|---|---|---|---|
| Labour | Donald Chapman | 26,580 | 52.8 | ▼0.2 |
| Conservative | Maurice Chandler | 23,730 | 47.2 | ▲7.6 |
| Majority | | 2,850 | 5.6 | ▼7.8 |
| Turnout | | 50,310 | 83.4 | ▼1.3 |
| Labour hold | | Swing | ▼3.9 | |

General election 1950: Birmingham, Northfield
| Party | Candidate | Votes | % | ±% |
|---|---|---|---|---|
| Labour | Raymond Blackburn | 26,714 | 53.0 | |
| Conservative | Tom Iremonger | 19,974 | 39.6 | |
| Liberal | Evan Laurence Frederick Richards | 3,280 | 6.5 | |
| Communist | Richard Albert Etheridge | 479 | 1.0 | |
| Majority | | 6,740 | 13.4 | |
| Turnout | | 50,447 | 84.7 | |
| Labour win (new seat) | | | | |

== See also ==
- Parliamentary constituencies in the West Midlands (county)
- List of parliamentary constituencies in West Midlands (region)
