= Warley West =

UK Parliament constituency (1974–1997)

- Former borough constituency for the House of Commons
- County: West Midlands
- Major settlements: Oldbury, Rowley Regis and Cradley Heath

1974–1997
- Seats: One
- Created from: Oldbury and Halesowen
- Replaced by: Warley; Halesowen & Rowley Regis

Warley West was a parliamentary constituency in the borough of Sandwell in the West Midlands of England. It was initially centred on the towns of Rowley Regis and Cradley Heath, and from 1983 also incorporated parts of Oldbury.

It returned one Member of Parliament (MP) to the House of Commons of the Parliament of the United Kingdom. It was created for the 1974 general election, and abolished for the 1997 general election.

The bulk of Warley West, namely the area around Oldbury, became part of the new Warley constituency, while the area around Rowley Regis and Cradley Heath was absorbed into the new Halesowen and Rowley Regis constituency, which is split between two local authorities (Dudley and Sandwell). Meanwhile, the Tividale section of the constituency (previously split between Dudley and Rowley Regis and Tipton), was incorporated into West Bromwich West.

== Boundaries ==
1974–1983: The County Borough of Warley wards of Cradley Heath, Langley, Old Hill and Blackheath, Rounds Green, Rowley, St Paul's, and Tividale.

1983–1997: The Metropolitan Borough of Sandwell wards of Blackheath, Cradley Heath and Old Hill, Langley, Oldbury, Rowley, and Tividale.

== Members of Parliament ==
Election	Member	Party
Feb 1974	Peter Archer	Labour
1992	John Spellar	Labour
1997	constituency abolished	

== Elections ==
=== Elections in the 1970s ===
General election February 1974: Warley West
Party	Candidate	Votes	%	±%
Labour	Peter Archer	28,891	66.94	
Conservative	A. Soskin	14,267	33.06	
Majority		14,624	33.88	
Turnout		43,158	71.03	
Labour hold		Swing		

General election October 1974: Warley West
Party	Candidate	Votes	%	±%
Labour	Peter Archer	24,761	60.35	
Conservative	Roger Evans	9,904	24.14	
Liberal	D. Owen	6,363	15.51	New
Majority		14,857	36.21	
Turnout		41,028	66.96	
Labour hold		Swing		

General election 1979: Warley West
Party	Candidate	Votes	%	±%
Labour	Peter Archer	25,175	58.39	
Conservative	Roger Evans	15,074	34.96	
Liberal	F. M. Fisher	2,864	6.64	
Majority		10,101	23.43	
Turnout		43,113	70.75	
Labour hold		Swing		

=== Elections in the 1980s ===
General election 1983: Warley West
Party	Candidate	Votes	%	±%
Labour	Peter Archer	18,272	47.14	
Conservative	Anthea McIntyre	13,004	33.55	
Alliance	Anthony Baines	7,485	19.31	
Majority		5,268	13.59	
Turnout		38,761	67.81	
Labour hold		Swing		

General election 1987: Warley West
Party	Candidate	Votes	%	±%
Labour	Peter Archer	19,825	49.21	
Conservative	Wallace Williams	14,432	35.83	
Alliance	Elaine Todd	6,027	14.96	
Majority		5,393	13.38	
Turnout		40,284	70.03	
Labour hold		Swing		

=== Elections in the 1990s ===
General election 1992: Warley West
Party	Candidate	Votes	%	±%
Labour	John Spellar	21,386	50.6	+1.4
Conservative	SA Whitehouse	15,914	37.7	+1.9
Liberal Democrats	E Todd	4,945	11.7	−3.3
Majority		5,472	12.9	−0.5
Turnout		42,245	73.9	+3.9
Labour hold		Swing	−0.2	
