= Peter Archer, Baron Archer of Sandwell =

British lawyer and Labour Party politician

The Right Honourable The Lord Archer of Sandwell QC PC
- Archer in 2011

Solicitor General for England and Wales
- In office 7 March 1974 – 4 May 1979
- Prime Minister: Harold Wilson; James Callaghan
- Preceded by: Sir Michael Havers
- Succeeded by: Sir Ian Percival
Shadow portfolios
Shadow Secretary of State for Northern Ireland
In office 31 October 1983 – 13 July 1987
Leader	Neil Kinnock
Preceded by	Don Concannon
Succeeded by	Kevin McNamara
Shadow Secretary of State for Trade
In office 24 November 1982 – 31 October 1983
Leader	Michael Foot
Preceded by	John Smith
Succeeded by	Peter Shore
Shadow Attorney General
In office 24 November 1981 – 24 November 1982
Leader	Michael Foot
Preceded by	John Morris
Succeeded by	Arthur Davidson

Member of the House of Lords
- Lord Temporal
- Life peerage 9 July 1992 – 14 June 2012

Member of Parliament for Warley West Rowley Regis and Tipton (1966–1974)
- In office 31 March 1966 – 16 March 1992
- Preceded by: Arthur Henderson
- Succeeded by: John Spellar

Personal details
- Born: Peter Kingsley Archer; 20 November 1926 Wednesbury, Staffordshire, England
- Died: 14 June 2012 (aged 85) Reading, Berkshire, England
- Party: Labour
- Spouse: Margaret Smith (m. 1954)
- Children: 1
- Education: London School of Economics
- Profession: Lawyer

Peter Kingsley Archer, Baron Archer of Sandwell, QC, PC (20 November 1926 – 14 June 2012), was a British lawyer and Labour Party politician. He was a Member of Parliament from 1966 until 1992, when he became a life peer. Between 1974 and 1979 he was Solicitor General for England and Wales.

== Early life and education ==
Archer was born in Wednesbury, Staffordshire on 20 November 1926. He left school at sixteen, and became a clerk for the Ministry of Health before spending four years working in coal mines under the Bevin Boys scheme. He subsequently obtained degrees in Philosophy and Law at the London School of Economics and University College London, and was called to the Bar at Gray's Inn in 1952.

== Career ==
Archer joined the Labour Party in 1947. He was selected in 1957 as the candidate for the Hendon South parliamentary seat, which he unsuccessfully contested in 1959 after declining to contest the 1957 by-election for his home area of Wednesbury. After contesting Brierley Hill in 1964, he was returned for Rowley Regis and Tipton in 1966. He served as Parliamentary Private Secretary to the Attorney General Sir Elwyn Jones (1967–1970) and in 1969 was the British representative on the United Nations' "third committee" on human rights.

While in opposition, Archer was a member of the All-Party Group for World Government (1970–1974), was appointed Queen's Counsel in 1971 and between 1971 and 1974 was Chair of Amnesty International's UK Section; he was a founder member of the Amnesty International Committee in 1961.

After boundary changes for the February 1974 election, Archer was returned for Warley West. In the new Labour government, led by Harold Wilson and then James Callaghan, he was appointed Solicitor General, a post he held until 1979. Archer and his colleague Attorney General Sam Silkin declined knighthoods, which was customary for individuals appointed to these positions. He was sworn of the Privy Council in 1977. In opposition, he was spokesman for legal affairs (1979–1982), Shadow Trade Secretary (1982–1983), and Shadow Secretary of State for Northern Ireland (1983–1987) under Neil Kinnock. He was also appointed a Recorder of the Crown Court in 1982. He stood down at the 1992 general election and subsequently received a life peerage as Baron Archer of Sandwell, of Sandwell in the County of West Midlands in 1992.

From 1992 to 1999 he was Chairman of the Council on Tribunals. In the House of Lords, in 1998 he successfully proposed an amendment to the Crime and Disorder Bill which abolished the death penalty for treason. The same year, he was appointed chair of the Enemy Property Claims Assessment Panel, a compensation fund for claims from families of Holocaust victims whose assets in Britain had been seized. He also chaired an independent inquiry which began in 2007 and reported in 2009, into how people had been given contaminated blood.

He was described as being an "extremely active" member of the Fabian Society, sitting on their executive committee between 1974 and 1986 and was chairman between 1980 and 1981. From 1993 until his death, he was their President, and over the same period served as President of Uniting for Peace (formerly the World Disarmament Campaign), and of the One World Trust.

== Personal life ==
Archer was a Methodist local preacher. He married Margaret Smith in 1954 and they had one son. At the time of his death, he lived in Wraysbury, Berkshire.

On 14 June 2012, Archer died at the Royal Berkshire Hospital from bronchopneumonia and viral encephalitis; he was 85. Upon his death, he was described as being a "vigorous campaigner" for human rights who had a commitment to world government. Paying tribute to him in The Independent, Tam Dalyell said: "Archer was one of those rare politicians who made judgements and whose actions followed what he believed to be right and eschewed what was wrong. ... Archer was an idealist, but an idealist with his feet on the ground, commanding respect and using every moment of his long public life constructively."

== Publications ==
- Archer, Peter (1956). The Queen's Courts. Harmondsworth: Penguin Books.
- Archer, Peter (1957). Social Welfare and the Citizen. Harmondsworth: Penguin Books.
- Archer, Peter (1963). Communism and the Law. London: The Bodley Head.
- Archer, Peter; Mackay, William Hugh (1966). Freedom at Stake. London: The Bodley Head.
- Archer, Peter (1969). Human Rights. London: Fabian Society.
- Archer, Peter (1973). Tribunals: a social court?. London: Fabian Society.
- Archer, Peter (1978). The Role of the Law Officers. London: Fabian Society.

Parliament of the United Kingdom
Preceded by Arthur Henderson	Member of Parliament for Rowley Regis and Tipton; 1966–Feb 1974	Constituency abolished
New constituency	Member of Parliament for Warley West; Feb 1974–1992	Succeeded by John Spellar
Legal offices
Preceded by Sir Michael Havers	Solicitor General for England and Wales; 1974–1979	Succeeded by Sir Ian Percival
Political offices
Preceded by Don Concannon	Shadow Secretary of State for Northern Ireland; 1983–1987	Succeeded by Kevin McNamara
Party political offices
Preceded by Phillip Whitehead	Chairman of the Fabian Society; 1979 – 1980	Succeeded by Shirley Williams
Preceded by Billy Hughes	President of the Fabian Society; 1993 – 2012	Succeeded by Post vacant
