= Penelope Jessel =

British politician (1920–1996)

Penelope Jessel

Dame Penelope Jessel DBE (née Blackwell; 2 January 1920 – 2 December 1996) was a British Liberal Party politician.

== Background ==
She was born Penelope Blackwell, a daughter of publisher Sir Basil Blackwell and Marion Christine Soans. She was educated at Dragon School, Oxford, St Leonards School, St Andrews, Fife, Somerville College, Oxford where she received a Master of Arts and the London School of Economics. In 1940 she married journalist Robert George Jessel. They had two sons, journalists David Jessel and Stephen Jessel. Her husband died in 1954. She was made a Dame for political services as part of the 1987 New Year Honours.

== Professional career ==
From 1940 to 1941 Jessel worked at Oxford House, London. She enlisted into the Auxiliary Territorial Service, serving from 1941 to 1943. She was a teacher at William Temple College from 1956 to 1962. In 1965 she had published Owen of Uppingham. She worked as a lecturer at Plater College, in Oxford from 1968 to 1984.

== Political career ==
Jessel was Liberal candidate for the Hall Green division of Birmingham at the 1964 General Election. She also fought the 1965 Birmingham Hall Green by-election. She was Liberal candidate for the Banbury division of Oxfordshire at the 1966 General Election. She was Liberal candidate for the Petersfield division of Hampshire at the 1970 General Election. She was Liberal candidate for the Wellingborough division of Northamptonshire at both 1974 General Elections. She did not stand for parliament again. She was President of the Women's Liberal Federation from 1970 to 1972. She was President of the Oxford Civic Society. She was Convenor of Trustees, for the John Stuart Mill Institute. She worked as International Officer, for the Liberal Party from 1985 to 1988.

=== Electoral record ===
General Election 1964: Birmingham, Hall Green
Party	Candidate	Votes	%	±%
Conservative	Aubrey Jones	23,879	52.5	
Labour	GS Rea	14,477	31.8	
Liberal	Penelope Jessel	7,113	15.6	
Majority		9,402	20.7	
Turnout			75.8	
Conservative hold		Swing		

1965 Birmingham Hall Green by-election
Party	Candidate	Votes	%	±%
Conservative	Reginald Eyre	17,130	54.8	+2.3
Labour	David Mumford	8,980	28.8	−3.0
Liberal	Penelope Jessel	5,122	16.4	+0.8
Majority		8,150		
Conservative hold		Swing		

General Election 1966: Banbury
Party	Candidate	Votes	%	±%
Conservative	Harry Neil Marten	28,932	47.53	
Labour	David Wright Young	24,529	40.30	
Liberal	Penelope Jessel	7,407	12.17	
Majority		4,403	7.23	
Turnout			81.95	
Conservative hold		Swing		

General Election 1970: Petersfield
Party	Candidate	Votes	%	±%
Conservative	Joan Mary Quennell	30,414	60.50	
Labour	Kelvin Horrocks	10,307	20.50	
Liberal	Penelope Jessel	7,783	15.48	
Independent	Michael Digby	1,766	3.51	
Majority		20,107	40.00	
Turnout			72.12	
Conservative hold		Swing		

General Election Feb 1974: Wellingborough
Party	Candidate	Votes	%	±%
Conservative	Sir Peter Fry	29,099	40.5	−11.7
Labour	J.H. Mann	26,829	37.3	−10.5
Liberal	Penelope Jessel	15,049	20.9	+20.9
Ind. Conservative	D.T. James	897	1.2	+1.2
Majority		2,720	3.1	−1.3
Turnout		84,562	85.00	+19570
Conservative hold		Swing	-16.3 (to Lib)	

General Election Oct 1974: Wellingborough
Party	Candidate	Votes	%	±%
Conservative	Sir Peter Fry	29,078	42.8	+2.3
Labour	J H Mann	27,320	40.2	+2.9
Liberal	Penelope Jessel	11,500	17.0	−3.9
Majority		1,758	2.6	−0.5
Turnout		85,288	79.61	+726
Conservative hold		Swing	+3.1 (from Lib)	
