= Brandwood =

Brandwood could refer to:

- Brandwood, Shropshire
- Brandwood (ward), Birmingham
- Brandwood End, Birmingham
