= Lynne Jones =

British politician (born 1951)

Member of Parliament for Birmingham Selly Oak
- In office 9 April 1992 – 12 April 2010
- Preceded by: Anthony Beaumont-Dark
- Succeeded by: Steve McCabe

Personal details
- Born: 26 April 1951 (age 75) Birmingham, Warwickshire, England
- Party: Green Party of England and Wales (2024–present)
- Other political affiliations: Independent (2023–2024); Labour (1974–2023)
- Spouse: Chris Kirk
- Children: 2 sons
- Education: University of Birmingham
- Profession: Biochemist
- Website: lynnejones.org.uk

Lynne Mary Jones (born 26 April 1951) is a British politician, who was the Labour Party Member of Parliament (MP) for Birmingham Selly Oak from 1992 until 2010.

== Early life ==
Jones was born in Birmingham, and attended the local Bartley Green Girls' Grammar School (now the comprehensive Hillcrest School) in Woodgate. She studied Biochemistry at the University of Birmingham, eventually gaining her Ph.D. in 1979. She also has a post-graduate Diploma in Housing Studies from Birmingham Polytechnic (now Birmingham City University). She worked in research at the University of Birmingham from 1972–86. She was a housing association manager from 1987–92. She joined the Labour Party in 1974.

She has worked in both science and housing, and was a councillor on Birmingham City Council representing Kings Norton ward from 1980–94.

== Parliamentary career ==
Jones was first elected to the House of Commons at the 1992 general election. She was a member of the Socialist Campaign Group and took part in almost all of the backbench rebellions against the Labour government, describing herself in 2006 as "one of the usual suspects" among the backbenchers.

Jones was Chair of the Parliamentary Forum on Transsexualism, and is a patron of Press for Change. From 1993–2001 she was on the Science and Technology Select Committee. During the 2005–10 parliament she was a member of the Environment, Food and Rural Affairs Select Committee. She also chaired the Socialist Campaign Group.

=== Leadership challenge ===
In February 2006, she announced her intention to stand against then Chancellor Gordon Brown in the Labour Party leadership contest expected to follow Prime Minister Tony Blair's resignation if nobody else did, so that Brown could not simply be "crowned". Subsequently, Socialist Campaign Group Chair John McDonnell attempted to stand instead, but failed to gain enough nominations from MPs and Brown was unopposed.

=== Retirement ===
Following boundary changes in Birmingham, which reduced its parliamentary representation from eleven to ten seats, Jones was expected to apply for selection for the redrawn Selly Oak constituency which contained wards from the former Selly Oak and Hall Green constituencies. However, in January 2007 Jones announced her intention to stand down at the 2010 general election. Jones refused to endorse Roger Godsiff in Hall Green, instead supporting the Respect candidate Salma Yaqoob, who came second.

== Later political activity ==
Following her retirement from the House of Commons in 2010, Jones re-founded the Labour branch in Brecon and Radnorshire.

=== National Executive Committee ===
In 2022, Jones ran to be on Labour's National Executive Committee, challenging former Welsh First Minister Carwyn Jones.

=== Change of party ===
In October 2023, Jones quit the Labour Party over Keir Starmer's comments on the Gaza war that appeared to support Israel cutting off Palestinian access to power and water. In May 2024, she joined the Green Party of England and Wales after unsuccessfully backing ex-Labour independent Jamie Driscoll in the North East mayoral election.

== Personal life ==
She is married, and has two sons. She married Chris Kirk in April 1994 in Lambeth. He is Chief Executive of the Biochemical Society.

In November 2009, she announced she was having treatment for breast cancer after a tumour was discovered at an early stage.

Parliament of the United Kingdom
Preceded by Anthony Beaumont-Dark	Member of Parliament for Birmingham Selly Oak; 1992 – 2010	Succeeded by Steve McCabe
