= David Jessel =

British news presenter and journalist (born 1945)

- Born: David Greenhalgh Jessel; 8 November 1945 (age 80); Abingdon, Berkshire, England
- Education: Dragon School; Eton College
- Alma mater: Merton College, Oxford
- Occupations: Journalist; Writer
- Parent(s): Robert Jessel and Penelope Jessel
- Relatives: Stephen Jessel (brother)

David Greenhalgh Jessel (born 8 November 1945) is a British former TV and radio news presenter, author, and campaigner against miscarriages of justice. From 2000 to 2010, he was also a commissioner of the Criminal Cases Review Commission.

== Background ==
David Jessel is the son of Robert Jessel, a former defence correspondent of The Times (London), and Dame Penelope Jessel, and the brother of journalist Stephen Jessel.

== Education ==
David Jessel was born in Abingdon and educated at the Dragon School, an independent school in Oxford, and at Eton College, to which he won a scholarship in 1959. He won an Exhibition to Merton College, Oxford, where he read Modern History. He was also secretary of the University's Dramatic Society, OUDS.

== Career at the BBC ==
He joined the BBC in 1967 on a trainee placement at BBC Birmingham, rising to become a presenter of the regional news programmes on television and radio. Early in 1968, Jessel moved to London to join the national radio news programme The World at One as one of the so-called "golden generation" of young British journalists, which included Roger Cook and Jonathan Dimbleby. Jessel's big break came with his reporting of the 1968 Paris riots. These reports pioneered the technique of actuality recordings for radio news, with Jessel recording his reports from the centre of the action. This new approach contrasted strongly with the dispassionate, detached style of reporting that predominated at the time.

Jessel resigned from The World at One in 1972 to join BBC 1's nightly TV current affairs programme, 24 Hours. On this and its successor programmes, he reported on stories from around the world including successive United States presidential elections in the 1970s, exposing atrocities in Honduras and Nicaragua in the 1980s and natural disasters such as the Friuli earthquake in Italy. In 1973, he and his BBC film crew were able to film one of the first areas openly controlled by Vietnamese communist forces following the 1973 truce with the United States.

== LBC ==
In October 1973, Jessel temporarily left the BBC to join commercial radio, becoming the opening presenter on LBC (London Broadcasting Company), Britain's first all-news radio station.

== Investigating injustice ==
On rejoining the BBC, Jessel moved to documentary-making, with a particular emphasis on miscarriages of justice. From 1985 he led the team at Rough Justice, the BBC's long-running investigative TV series which re-examined the cases of a dozen people convicted of serious crimes, usually murder, and led to the eventual quashing of most of the convictions. Among his successful cases were the brothers Paul and Wayne Darvell, who typified the unglamorous and forgotten cases that Jessel and his team championed.

In 1990, the Rough Justice team decamped to Channel 4 and set up a production company, Just Television, dedicated exclusively to the investigation and publicising of miscarriages of justice. Jessel had been angered by the BBC's threats to drop the programme due to financial constraints and said: "I couldn't stand being cut back when programmes glorifying the police were expanding like a giant fungus." The chairman of Just Television's advisory board was Jessel's friend and mentor Ludovic Kennedy, an investigator of wrongful convictions. The new programme, Trial and Error, continued to expose wrongful convictions, including the cases of Peter Fell, Mary Druhan Sheila Bowler and Danny McNamee – all of which led to the convictions being quashed by the Court of Appeal.

== Criminal Cases Review Commission ==
From 2000 to 2010, Jessel was a commissioner of the Criminal Cases Review Commission, an independent public body set up to investigate possible miscarriages of justice in England, Wales and Northern Ireland.

The Commission assesses whether convictions or sentences should be referred to a court of appeal. Jessel had been a prominent supporter and advocate of such an independent public body for many years prior to its creation.

On his retirement as senior commissioner, The Times described Jessel as "a tireless champion of the wrongfully convicted".

== Other broadcasting and public positions ==
Since 2004, Jessel has been a regular anchor on BBC World News, as well as a guest presenter on the channel's flagship interview programme HARDtalk.

He has served on the Advertising Standards Authority's advisory council, and is a member of the Code Compliance Tribunal of PhonePay+ regulating telephone premium-rate services.

He currently sits on the Complaints Board of the independent press regulator IPSO.

== Publications ==
In 1989, Jessel co-authored the international bestseller Brain Sex with scientist Anne Moir, the first scientific analysis of the differences between the male and female mind. In 1995, the same partnership produced A Mind to Crime, which looked at the biological influences on criminality. Jessel also wrote Trial and Error, a book to accompany the Channel 4 television series.

== Awards and recognition ==
- Bar Council Special Award for Journalism (1994), only the second such award (after Sir Ludovic Kennedy)
- Three Royal Television Society awards
- Honorary Doctorate from the University of Central England (now Birmingham City University)

Media offices
Preceded by Brian Widlake	Main presenter: The World at One; 1970–1972	Succeeded by Robin Day
