= Kate Eadie =

English artist (1880–1945)

Kate Muriel Mason Eadie RMS ARBSA
- Born: 4 May 1880; Harborne, Birmingham, England
- Died: 8 November 1945 (aged 65); Alcester, Warwickshire, England
- Education: Birmingham School of Art
- Occupations: Jeweller, stained-glass designer
- Style: Arts and Crafts
- Spouse: Sidney Meteyard (m. 1940)

Kate Muriel Mason Eadie RMS ARBSA (4 May 1880 – 8 November 1945) was a British jeweller and craftswoman in Birmingham, working in the Arts and Crafts style.

Eadie was born to Richard William Eadie (1851–1920) and Fanny Sophia Eadie, née Mason (1857–1938). In September 1940, she married the Birmingham Pre-Raphaelite painter Sidney Meteyard, whom she met when she studied at Birmingham School of Art, having modelled for many of his pictures, including the drawing Jasmine. They worked together on stained glass.

A well as jewellery, she made larger items such as fire screens.

In 1915, she was elected an associate of the Royal Birmingham Society of Artists, with whom she had exhibited a case of jewellery in 1908–1909, a processional cross in 1909, and another case of jewellery in 1911.

At one time, she lived at The Malthouse, Evesham Road, Cookhill, Alcester, Warwickshire, with her sisters, and with Meteyard.

She died on 8 November 1945. She is buried in Brandwood End Cemetery, Birmingham.
