= Al Carns =

British politician and Royal Marines officer (born 1980)

Colonel Al Carns DSO OBE MC MP
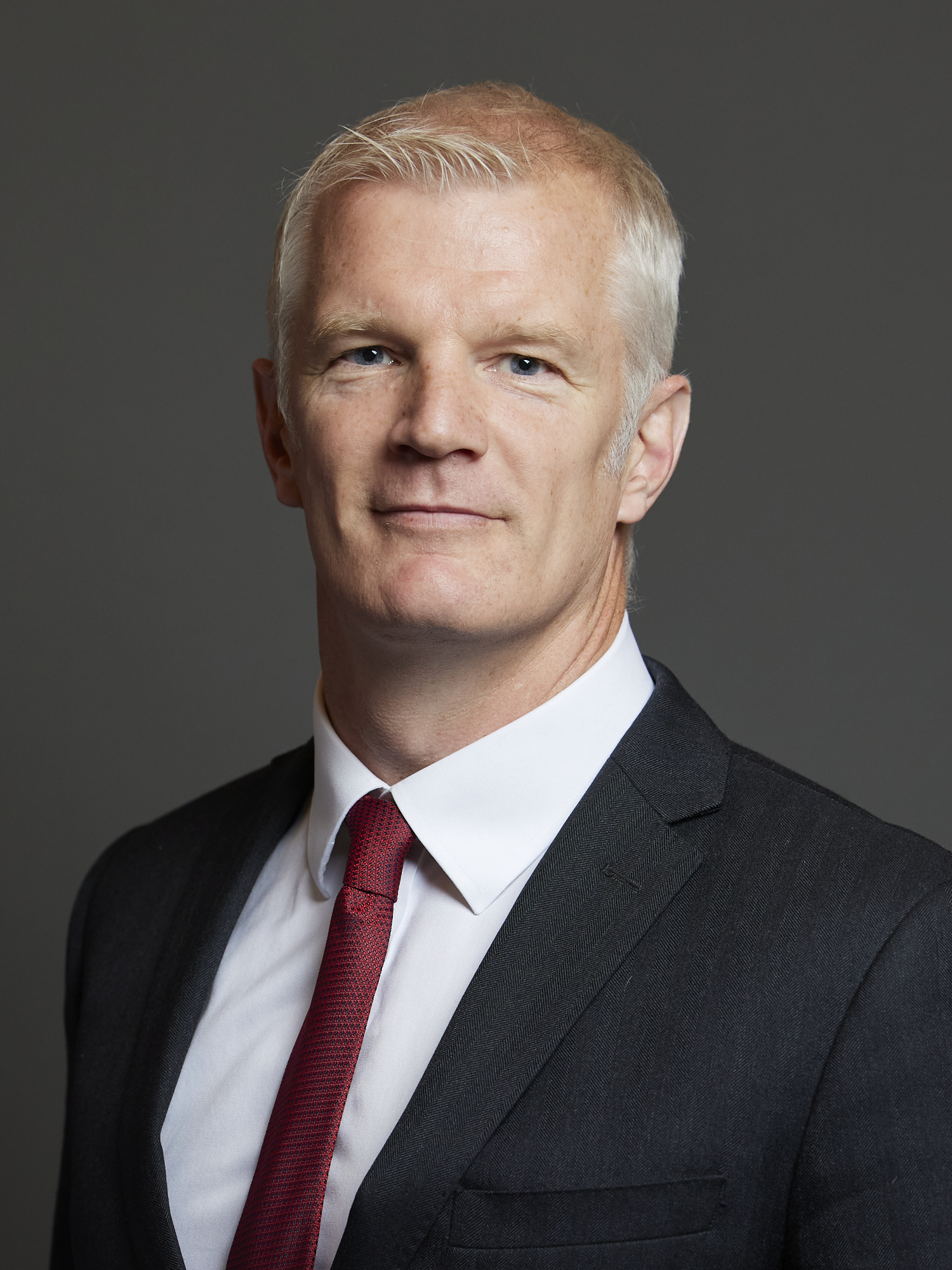
- Official portrait, 2024

Parliamentary Under-Secretary of State for the Armed Forces
- In office 6 September 2025 – 11 June 2026
- Prime Minister: Keir Starmer
- Preceded by: Luke Pollard
- Succeeded by: Louise Sandher-Jones

Parliamentary Under-Secretary of State for Veterans and People
- In office 9 July 2024 – 6 September 2025
- Prime Minister: Keir Starmer
- Preceded by: Johnny Mercer
- Succeeded by: Louise Sandher-Jones

Member of Parliament for Birmingham Selly Oak
- Incumbent
- Assumed office 4 July 2024
- Preceded by: Steve McCabe
- Majority: 11,537 (30.1%)

Personal details
- Born: Alistair Scott Carns; 27 March 1980 (age 46) Aberdeen, Scotland
- Party: Labour
- Children: 3
- Website: alcarns.co.uk

Military service
- Allegiance: United Kingdom
- Branch/service: Royal Marines
- Years of service: 1999–2024 (regular); 2024–present (reserve)
- Rank: Colonel
- Unit: Special Boat Service
- Battles/wars: War in Afghanistan
- Awards: Companion of the Distinguished Service Order (2024); Officer of the Order of the British Empire (2022); Military Cross (2011); Mentioned in dispatches (2007)

Colonel Alistair Scott Carns (born 27 March 1980) is a British Labour Party politician. He has been the member of Parliament (MP) for Birmingham Selly Oak since 2024, and was a junior government minister between 2024 and 2026. He is a reserve Royal Marines officer and a former regular officer.

He was the parliamentary under-secretary of state for veterans and people from 2024 to 2025, and was the parliamentary under-secretary for the armed forces from September 2025 until his resignation on 11 June 2026 as part of the 2026 Labour Party leadership crisis.

== Early life and education ==
Carns was born on 27 March 1980, in Aberdeen, Scotland. One of five siblings, he shared a bedroom with his two brothers, and was raised by their single mother, in a three-bedroom home in Heatheryfold, next to a council estate. He was educated at Hazlehead Academy, a comprehensive secondary school in Aberdeen, with an interest in military history, described by his History teacher as sporty, eclipsed only by his "accident proneness". He suffered a broken neck and leg and in a separate barbecue incident, third degree burns over 11% of his body. He returned to college to improve his maths grades, completing a HND in physical fitness and sports science at Aberdeen College to increase his chance of enlisting in the Armed Forces.

He developed an early interest in deep sea diving from visits to his father at work in Dyce, inspiring him with an ambition to become a combat diver.

== Military career ==
Carns enlisted as a Royal Marine Commando in 1999. He was commissioned as an officer in September 2002, and appointed to the trained strength as a captain in September 2003. He was promoted to major on 1 October 2010, to lieutenant colonel on 30 June 2016, and to colonel on 26 July 2021.

Carns served with the Special Boat Service (SBS), part of the UK's special forces. The Independent reported that he had "served in every major conflict this country has been engaged in for the last two dozen years", but much of the detail could not be made public for security reasons. He has stated he came close to death more than four times during his service.

Carns served five operational tours in Afghanistan, and was mentioned in dispatches "in recognition of gallant and distinguished services in Afghanistan during the period 1st October 2006 to 31st March 2007". In September 2011, he was awarded the Military Cross (MC) "in recognition of gallant and distinguished services in Afghanistan during the period 1st October 2010 to 31st March 2011". In the 2022 Queen's Birthday Honours, he was appointed Officer of the Order of the British Empire (OBE).

Carns was a military adviser to three Defence Secretaries: Michael Fallon, Gavin Williamson and Penny Mordaunt.

Carns was expecting to be promoted to brigadier in June 2024, but in May 2024 he resigned his commission in order to stand for the Labour Party in the 2024 general election.

Carns re-enlisted in the Royal Marines as a reservist in November 2024.

In the 2025 New Year Honours, Carns was appointed a Companion of the Distinguished Service Order (DSO) "in recognition of gallant and distinguished services in the field during the period 1 October 2023 to 31 March 2024". He received the insignia during a ceremony in July 2025; his was the first to feature King Charles III's cypher.

== Political career ==
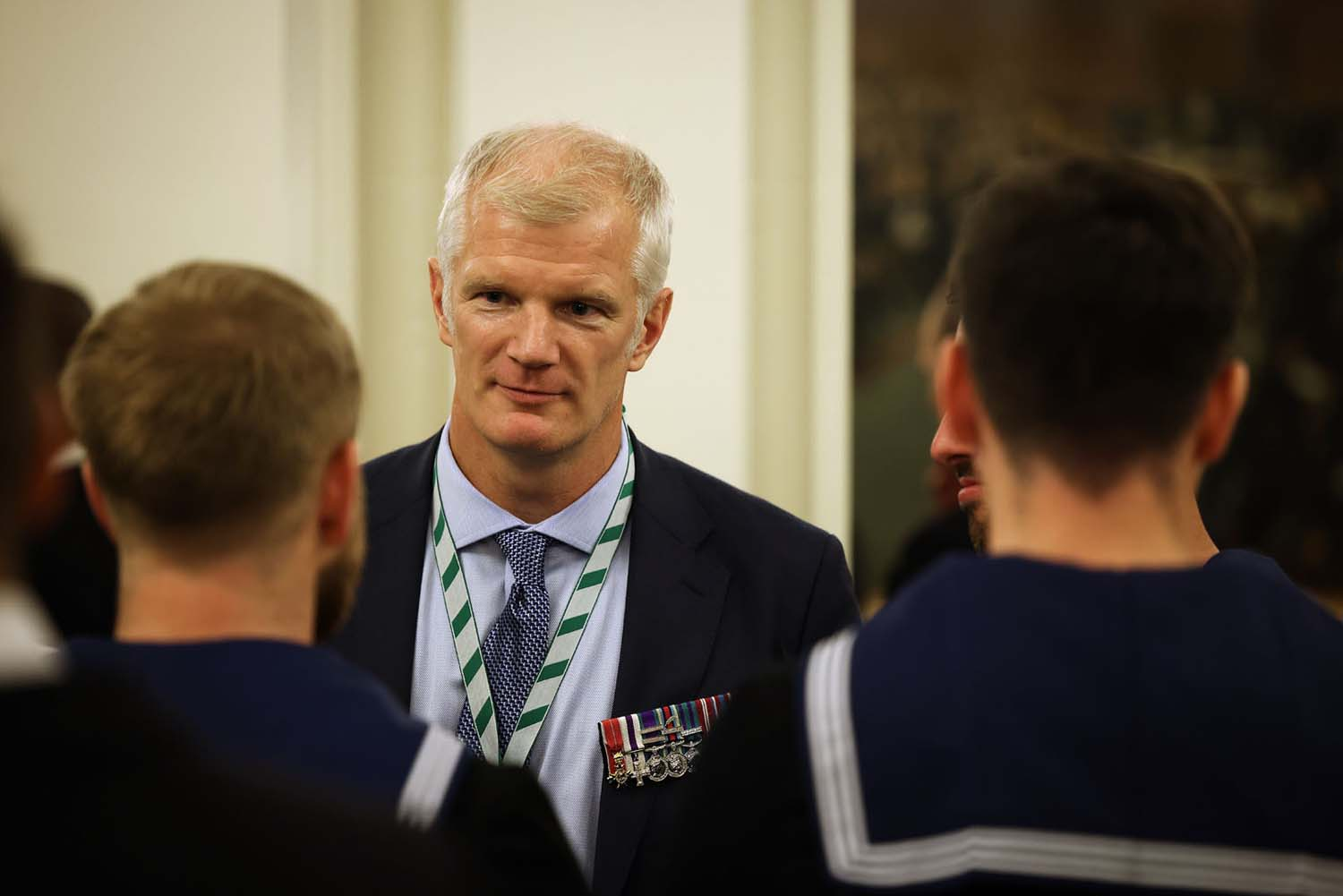
Carns with Navy personnel, 2024

Carns left the Royal Marines in 2024 so that he could stand as a candidate in the general election. He had previously voted for the Conservative Party, and surprised his colleagues when he intended to stand as a Labour Party candidate.

In the 2024 general election, he was elected Member of Parliament (MP) for Birmingham Selly Oak with 17,371 votes (45.2%) and a majority of 11,537. On 24 July 2024, Carns made his maiden speech in the House of Commons during a debate on education and opportunity.

On 9 July 2024, he was appointed Parliamentary Under-Secretary of State for Veterans and People in the Ministry of Defence. This ministerial post is also simply known as the Minister for Veterans and People. In September 2025, Carns became the Parliamentary Under-Secretary of State for the Armed Forces, also known as the Minister for the Armed Forces.

During the 2026 Labour Party leadership crisis, he was named as a possible dark horse candidate for the Labour Party leadership after Keir Starmer stood down; following media speculation in the weeks that followed Starmer's resignation, Carns ruled out running and endorsed Andy Burnham. He resigned as minister on 11 June 2026, after Defence Secretary John Healey resigned earlier in the day. In his resignation letter, Carns stated that "the character of conflict is changing faster than our procurement can keep up with", and criticised the defence investment plan agreed by Chancellor of the Exchequer Rachel Reeves, arguing that it was "not built for the threat we face" and was "neither transformative enough nor sufficiently funded".

== Personal life ==
Carns is divorced and has three children, two sons and a daughter (who graduated in pharmacy in 2025).

Carns set a record by reaching the summit of Mount Everest in under five days, without the usual acclimatisation processes, on 21 May 2025, as part of a team of four British former-special forces members, trialling the use of xenon gas to speed up altitude acclimatisation. He said, "The reality is if I had six to eight weeks to climb Everest, I would, but I'm a government minister and I don't have time."

== Honours ==

Ribbon	Description	Notes
	Distinguished Service Order	Appointed Companion (DSO) in 2025
	Order of the British Empire	Appointed Officer (OBE) in the Military Division in 2022
	Military Cross	(MC)
	General Service Medal (1962)	With two clasps
	Operational Service Medal for Afghanistan	With mentioned in dispatches oak leaf; With clasp
	General Service Medal (2008)	With clasp
	Queen Elizabeth II Diamond Jubilee Medal	6 February 2012
	Queen Elizabeth II Platinum Jubilee Medal	6 February 2022
	King Charles III Coronation Medal	6 May 2023
	Accumulated Campaign Service Medal 2011	
	Naval Long Service and Good Conduct Medal (1848)	2020

Parliament of the United Kingdom
Preceded by Steve McCabe	Member of Parliament for Birmingham Selly Oak; 2024–present	Incumbent
