= Hermione Eyre =

British journalist, novelist, and former child actor

- Born: 1980 (age 45–46)
- Education: Hertford College, Oxford
- Occupations: Journalist, novelist
- Spouse: Alex Burghart (m. 2012)
- Father: Reginald Eyre
- Writing career
- Language: English
- Genre: Historical fiction
- Notable work: Viper Wine
- Website: www.hermioneeyre.com

Hermione Eyre (born 1980) is a British journalist, novelist, and former child actor.

== Early life ==
Hermione Eyre was born in 1980. Her parents were Sir Reginald Eyre, a British Conservative party politician, and Anne Clements. Her godmother was the actress Hermione Gingold, who was a friend of her mother and her namesake.

Eyre studied at Rugby School, joining at the age of 13 in the first year that the school admitted girls.

Eyre read English at Hertford College, Oxford.

After university, Eyre trained as a croupier at the Bermondsey Casino Training Centre, and worked for a year at a London casino, dealing roulette and blackjack.

== Career ==
=== Acting ===
At the age of 7, Eyre acted in About Face, a sitcom with Maureen Lipman. She also acted as a young Agatha Christie in a BBC production. In 1990, Eyre obtained a role as Zinnie in the film The Children with Kim Novak and Ben Kingsley.

Aged 12, Eyre acted in her final role – as the Kid Clementina in an episode of the television series Jeeves and Wooster.

=== Journalism ===
Eyre worked at The Independent as a staff writer for seven years. She was also a television critic for that newspaper.

Eyre is known for her long-form interviews with celebrities, publishing her works in the London Evening Standard Magazine, where she is a contributing editor. She has also written for the New Statesman, and The Spectator.

=== Books ===
Eyre co-wrote The Dictionary of National Celebrity in 2005.

In 2014, she published a work of historical fiction Viper Wine, featuring Venetia Stanley and Kenelm Digby, which was nominated for the Folio Prize, and short-listed for the Walter Scott Prize. Her novel won the Kitschies: Golden Tentacle award for best debut.

Eyre cites Borges, Dorothy Parker and Charles Dickens as influences.

== Personal life ==
Eyre lives in Archway, London. In 2012, she married Alex Burghart, now a Conservative MP.
