= Andrew Hargreaves (politician) =

British politician (born 1955)

Andrew Raikes Hargreaves (born 15 May 1955) is a former British Conservative Party politician.

Having unsuccessfully stood in 1983 for Blyth Valley (which was eventually won by the Conservatives in 2019), Hargreaves was elected Member of Parliament for Birmingham Hall Green in 1987. He lost his seat in the Labour landslide at the 1997 general election on a 14% swing, to Stephen McCabe.

Parliament of the United Kingdom
Preceded by Sir Reginald Eyre	Member of Parliament for Birmingham Hall Green; 1987–1997	Succeeded by Stephen McCabe
