= 1965 Birmingham Hall Green by-election =

UK Parliamentary by-election

The 1965 Birmingham Hall Green by-election of 6 May 1965 was held after the appointment to the Prices and Incomes Board of incumbent Conservative MP Aubrey Jones.

The seat was considered safe, having been won at the 1964 United Kingdom general election by over 9,400 votes

== Result of the previous general election ==
General election 1964: Birmingham Hall Green
Party	Candidate	Votes	%	±%
Conservative	Aubrey Jones	23,879	52.5	−10.1
Labour	G Rea	14,477	31.8	−1.4
Liberal	Penelope Jessel	7,113	15.6	New
Majority		9,402	20.7	−8.7
Turnout		45,469	75.8	−0.4
Conservative hold		Swing	-4.4	

== Result of the by-election ==
By-election 1965: Birmingham Hall Green
Party	Candidate	Votes	%	±%
Conservative	Reginald Eyre	17,130	54.8	+2.3
Labour	David Mumford	8,980	28.8	−3.0
Liberal	Penelope Jessel	5,122	16.4	+0.8
Majority		8,150	26.0	+5.3
Turnout		31,232		
Conservative hold		Swing		
