= Steve McCabe =

British Labour Party politician (born 1955)

The Right Honourable The Lord McCabe
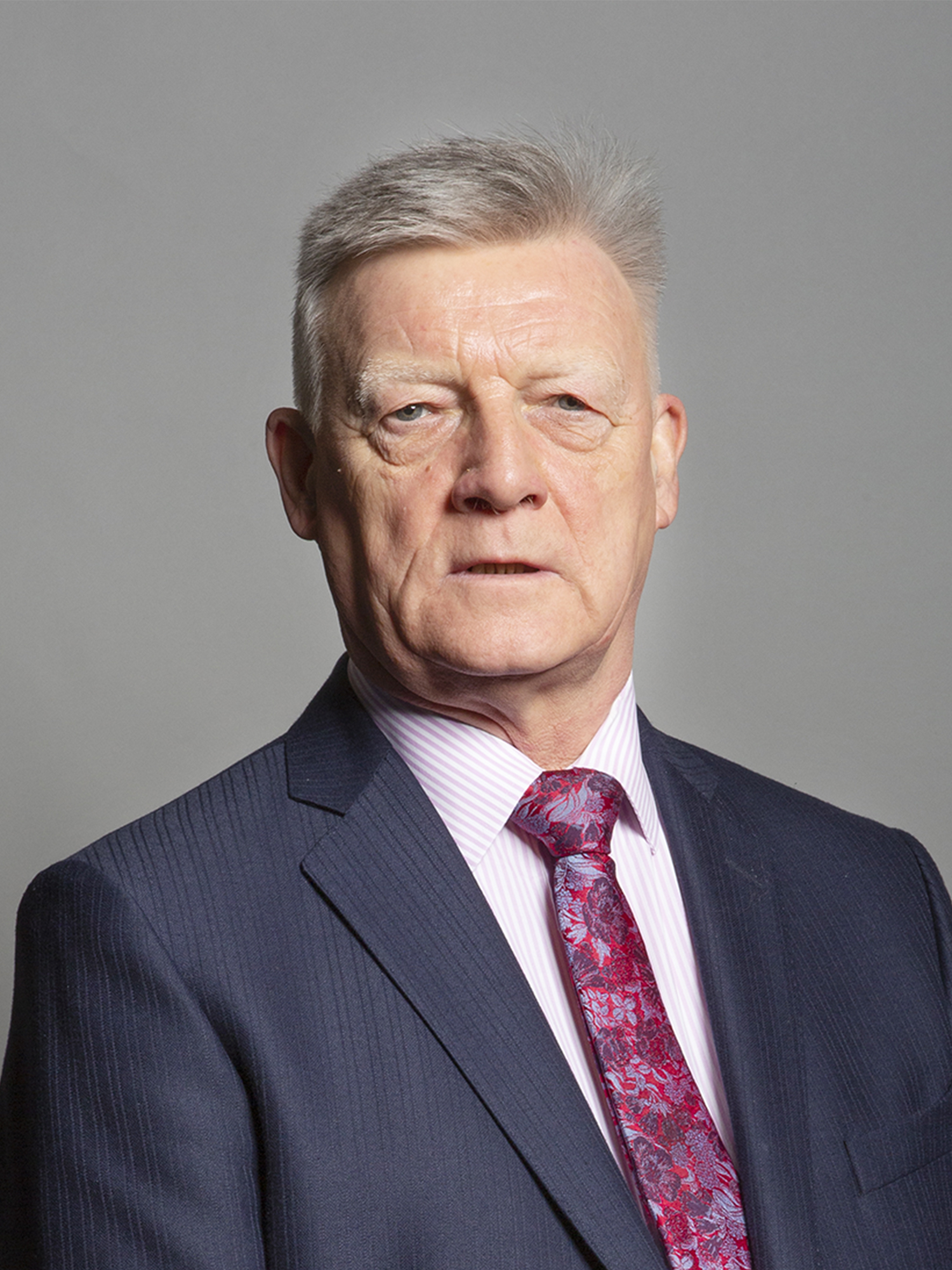
- Official portrait, 2019

Member of the House of Lords
- Lord Temporal
- Life peerage 7 February 2025

Member of Parliament for Birmingham Selly Oak
- In office 6 May 2010 – 30 May 2024
- Preceded by: Lynne Jones
- Succeeded by: Al Carns

Member of Parliament for Birmingham Hall Green
- In office 1 May 1997 – 12 April 2010
- Preceded by: Andrew Hargreaves
- Succeeded by: Roger Godsiff
Government whip offices
2007–2010	Lord Commissioner
2006–2007	Assistant Whip
Shadow portfolios
2023–2024	Veterans
2013–2015	Children and Families
2010–2010	Whip

Member of Birmingham City Council for Brandwood
- In office 3 May 1990 – 7 May 1998
- Preceded by: R. Tyler
- Succeeded by: T. Davies

Personal details
- Born: Stephen James McCabe; 4 August 1955 (age 71) Port Glasgow, Scotland
- Party: Labour
- Education: Moray House, Edinburgh (CQSW); University of Bradford (MA)
- Website: stevemccabe.org

Stephen James McCabe, Baron McCabe (born 4 August 1955) is a British politician who served as a Member of Parliament (MP) from 1997 to 2024. A member of the Labour Party, he represented Birmingham Hall Green from 1997 to 2010 and Birmingham Selly Oak from 2010 onwards.

== Early life and career ==
Stephen McCabe was born on 4 August 1955 in Port Glasgow. He attended Port Glasgow High School before studying at Moray House College (later named Moray House School of Education, University of Edinburgh) in Edinburgh, where he was awarded a Diploma in Social Studies (Certificate of Qualification in Social Work) in 1977 and qualified as a social worker.

He worked as a social worker in Wolverhampton for six years from 1977, and from 1978 to 1982 was a shop steward with the National and Local Government Officers' Association.

In 1983, he was appointed manager of the Priory in Thatcham, providing alternatives to care and custody for young people for Berkshire Social Services. He left the Priory in 1985 and returned to education, graduating with an MA in Social Work at the University of Bradford in 1986.

Following his degree, he worked as a social services lecturer at the North East Worcestershire College in Redditch. In 1989, he became a child care worker in Solihull until 1991 when he was appointed as an education adviser to the Central Council for Education and Training in Social Work (now called the General Social Care Council). He remained in this position until his election to the House of Commons.

He was elected as a councillor to Birmingham City Council in 1990 and served until 1998, during which time he was the chair of the city's technical services committee.

== Parliamentary career ==
=== House of Commons ===
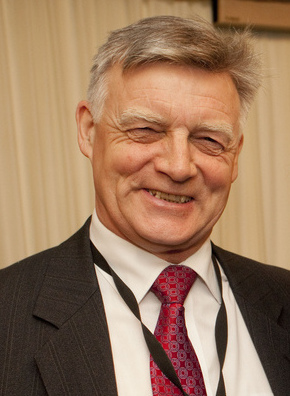
McCabe in 2011

McCabe was elected as the Labour MP for Birmingham Hall Green at the 1997 general election with 53.5% of the vote and a majority of 8,420. He was re-elected as MP for Birmingham Hall Green at the 2001 general election with an increased vote share of 54.6% and a decreased majority of 6,648.

He served as the Parliamentary private secretary to Charles Clarke in his capacity as Secretary of State for Education and Skills from 2003-2004 and as Home Secretary from 2004–2005. He joined the government Whips Office in 2006 as an Assistant, and from 2007 was a Lord Commissioner to the Treasury (a full Whip).

At the 2005 general election, McCabe was again re-elected as MP for Birmingham Hall Green, with a decreased vote share of 47.2% and a decreased majority of 5,714.

In October 2006, McCabe applied for selection to the redrawn constituency of Birmingham Selly Oak, which incorporated much of his existing seat. He was duly selected by the local Labour party in January 2007.

In the 2009 expenses scandal, it was revealed that McCabe had over-claimed on his mortgage by £4,059. A three-month investigation by the parliamentary fees office resulted in McCabe calling for Commons officials to be sacked. He later said: "I did make an error in my claim and, as the letter from the fees office shows, this money was repaid in a deduction from my next claim". Between 2004 and 2008, McCabe claimed £54,699 in expenses for his second home, on which he has a £60,000 mortgage. The claims included £5,500 for a new kitchen.

At the 2010 general election, McCabe was elected to Parliament as MP for Birmingham Selly Oak with 38.5% of the vote and a majority of 3,482.

From 2013 to 2015, he served as a Shadow Minister for Children and Families as part of Ed Miliband's front bench team.

In July 2013, McCabe called for a referendum on remaining in the EU to be held "as soon as possible", stating he found himself "at odds with his party" on the issue. McCabe joined 18 other Labour MPs in backing a referendum on Europe in a House of Commons vote called by rebel Conservative MPs.

At the 2015 general election, McCabe was re-elected as MP for Birmingham Selly Oak with an increased vote share of 47.7% and an increased majority of 8,447. He was again re-elected at the snap 2017 general election with an increased vote share of 62.9% and an increased majority of 15,207. At the 2019 general election, McCabe was again re-elected, with a decreased vote share of 56% and a decreased majority of 12,414.

McCabe was appointed Parliamentary Chair of the Labour Friends of Israel in February 2020. He is a long-standing supporter and visited Israel as part of a delegation in 2019.

In May 2022, McCabe announced his support for sanctions against Iran to "curb their nuclear ambitions".

Due to his statements in Parliament and his role as chair of the Labour Friends of Israel, Palestine Solidarity campaign (PSC) and the local group Palestine Solidarity Selly Oak have organised protests outside his surgeries, calling on him to engage with constituents' views effectively or resign.

On 28 May 2024, he announced that he was not standing for re-election in the 2024 general election.

=== House of Lords ===
On 20 December 2024, McCabe was nominated for a life peerage as part of the 2024 Political Peerages. He was created Baron McCabe, of Selly Oak in the City of Birmingham and of Broadfield in the County of Renfrewshire on 7 February 2025.

== Personal life ==
McCabe married Lorraine Lea Clendon in 1991.

In 2012, he underwent open heart surgery at the Queen Elizabeth Hospital Birmingham for a heart murmur. In August 2017, McCabe suffered minor facial injuries after a motorcyclist in Kings Heath, Birmingham threw a brick at him, which he reported to the police.

Parliament of the United Kingdom
Preceded by Andrew Hargreaves	Member of Parliament for Birmingham Hall Green; 1997–2010	Succeeded by Roger Godsiff
Preceded by Lynne Jones	Member of Parliament for Birmingham Selly Oak; 2010–2024	Succeeded by Al Carns
