= Harold Gurden =

British politician (1903–1989)

Sir Harold Edward Gurden (28 June 1903 – 27 April 1989) was a British Conservative Party politician.

Gurden was educated in Birmingham at Lyttelton School and Birmingham University. He married Lucy Isabella, née Izon, on 16 April 1929. He became a technician in the dairy and food industries, and was founder-president of the Birmingham and District Dairymen's Association (1947–1950) and chairman of the Society of Dairy Technology (Midland Division). He was sometime President of the RSPCA.

== Professional life ==
Gurden served as a councillor on Birmingham City Council from 1946 to 1956, representing the ward of Selly Oak.

He was member of parliament for Birmingham Selly Oak from May 1955 to September 1974, before he lost the seat to Labour's Thomas Litterick.

Gurden was a strong proponent of the right to buy and a key figure in the campaign to compel local authorities to sell their council homes. In January 1972, he tabled a Private Members Bill that proposed "to extend to the tenants of dwellings owned by local authorities and other housing bodies the right to acquire the ownership or leasehold of their home".

Gurden was one of the first MPs to join the Conservative Monday Club.

He was knighted in the 1983 Birthday Honours.

Parliament of the United Kingdom
New constituency	Member of Parliament for Birmingham Selly Oak; 1955–Oct 1974	Succeeded by Tom Litterick
