= Stephen Jessel =

British newsreader and reporter (1943–2025)

Stephen Jessel (9 August 1943 – 7 March 2025) was a British newsreader and reporter who was for many years a BBC correspondent, based between 1977 and 1995 in Paris, Beijing, Brussels, Washington D.C., and again Paris. He had previously worked, after leaving university, for The Times of London as a reporter and education correspondent. Before joining the BBC foreign staff, he worked as reporter and again education correspondent.

== Life and career ==
Jessel was born in Burnham, Buckinghamshire, England on 9 August 1943, the son of The Times defence correspondent, Robert Jessel, who died aged 37, and Dame Penelope Jessel (née Blackwell), and the brother of journalist David Jessel. He was educated at the Dragon School in Oxford, and Shrewsbury School. He won an Open Exhibition to Balliol College, Oxford, leaving with a first in Mods and a Third in Greats.

As a BBC correspondent, he was a prolific contributor to From Our Own Correspondent and remained with the BBC as a freelance after ceasing to be a staff correspondent and broadcast after the death of Diana, Princess of Wales in Paris.

He later worked for AFP as a translator and sub-editor, and taught at the now-defunct Journalists in Europe Fund as well as in Kosovo, Algeria, Albania, Georgia and Liberia. He worked extensively as an editor for the OECD.

In 1970, he married Jane Margaret Marshall, with whom he had a daughter in 1981. He died on 7 March 2025, at the age of 81.
