= Birmingham Selly Oak =

Parliamentary constituency in the United Kingdom, 1955 onwards

Coordinates: 52.42°N 1.91°W

- Borough constituency for the House of Commons
- Boundaries since 2024
- Boundary of Birmingham Selly Oak in West Midlands region
- County: West Midlands
- Population: 104,067 (2011 census)
- Electorate: 76,285 (2023)

Current constituency
- Created: 1955
- Member of Parliament: Al Carns (Labour)
- Seats: One
- Created from: Birmingham King's Norton, Birmingham Northfield and Birmingham Sparkbrook

Birmingham Selly Oak is a constituency (Note: A borough constituency (for the purposes of election expenses and type of returning officer)) in the West Midlands, represented in the House of Commons of the UK Parliament since 2024 by Al Carns of the Labour Party. (Note: As with all constituencies, the constituency elects one Member of Parliament (MP) by the first past the post system of election at least every five years.)

== Constituency profile ==
The constituency is located within Birmingham to the south of the city centre. It contains the more urban, industrial areas of Selly Oak and Stirchley and the more suburban areas of Warstock and Billesley.

The area has a history of chocolate production; the visitor attraction of Cadbury World is located in the constituency at the site of the former Cadbury factory, and the model village of Bournville next to the site was built to accommodate the factory's workers. Compared to national averages, residents of the constituency are younger, better-educated and have similar levels of wealth. The constituency is less ethnically diverse than the rest of Birmingham but more so than the country as a whole; 69% of residents are White, 16% are Asian and 6% are Black.

In 1966, 7.9% of the constituency was born in the New Commonwealth.

At most recent city council election in 2026, most seats in the constituency (9 of 11) were won by Green Party candidates, whilst one Conservative Party and one Labour Party councillor were elected. A majority of voters in the constituency, an estimated 53%, supported remaining in the European Union in the 2016 referendum, higher than the national percentage of 48%.

== Boundaries ==
The seat includes many students and staff from the nearby University of Birmingham. Half of the university's Selly Oak campus is located within the constituency. The Cadbury factory and Cadbury World are also within its boundaries.

1955–1974: The County Borough of Birmingham wards of Balsall Heath, Moseley and King's Heath, and Selly Oak.

1974–1983: The County Borough of Birmingham wards of King's Norton, Moseley, and Selly Oak.

1983–1997: The City of Birmingham wards of Bournville, King's Norton, Moseley, and Selly Oak (as they existed on 1 February 1983).

1997–2010: The City of Birmingham wards of Bournville, King's Norton, Moseley, and Selly Oak (as they existed on 1 June 1994).

2010–2018: The City of Birmingham wards of Billesley, Bournville, Brandwood, and Selly Oak.

Major changes, with King's Norton transferred to Birmingham Northfield and Moseley to Birmingham Hall Green. Billesley and Brandwood were transferred from Birmingham Hall Green.

2018–2024: Following a local government boundary review, which did not effect the parliamentary boundaries, the contents of the constituency were as follows with effect from May 2018:

- The City of Birmingham wards of Bournbrook & Selly Park, Druids Heath & Monyhull, Highter's Heath, and Stirchley, most of Billesley and Bournville & Cotteridge, the majority of Brandwood & King's Heath, and a small part of Weoley & Selly Oak.

2024–present: Further to the 2023 periodic review of Westminster constituencies which came into effect for the 2024 general election, the constituency comprises:

- The City of Birmingham wards of Billesley; Bournbrook & Selly Park; Bournville & Cotteridge; Druids Heath & Monyhull; Highter's Heath; Stirchley; part of Brandwood & King's Heath; and a small area of Weoley & Selly Oak.

Minor differences reflecting the revised ward structure.

== History ==
Since its creation in 1955 the constituency has switched hands three times between Labour and the Conservatives. The seat has progressively swung towards Labour from being a safe Conservative seat; this has been attributed to housing redevelopments that took place in the 1960s and 1970s. More recently, it has acquired a reputation for electing outspoken MPs, first with the victory of Anthony Beaumont-Dark of the Conservatives in 1979, and then with his defeat by Lynne Jones of the Labour Party in 1992.

== Members of Parliament ==
Election	Member	Party	Notes
1955	Harold Gurden	Conservative	
October 1974	Tom Litterick	Labour	
1979	Anthony Beaumont-Dark	Conservative	
1992	Lynne Jones	Labour	
Constituency split, minority joined the new Birmingham Hall Green and Birmingham Northfield, majority merged with majority of the old Birmingham Hall Green
2010	Steve McCabe	Labour	Member for Birmingham Hall Green (1997–2010)
2024	Al Carns	Labour	

== Elections ==
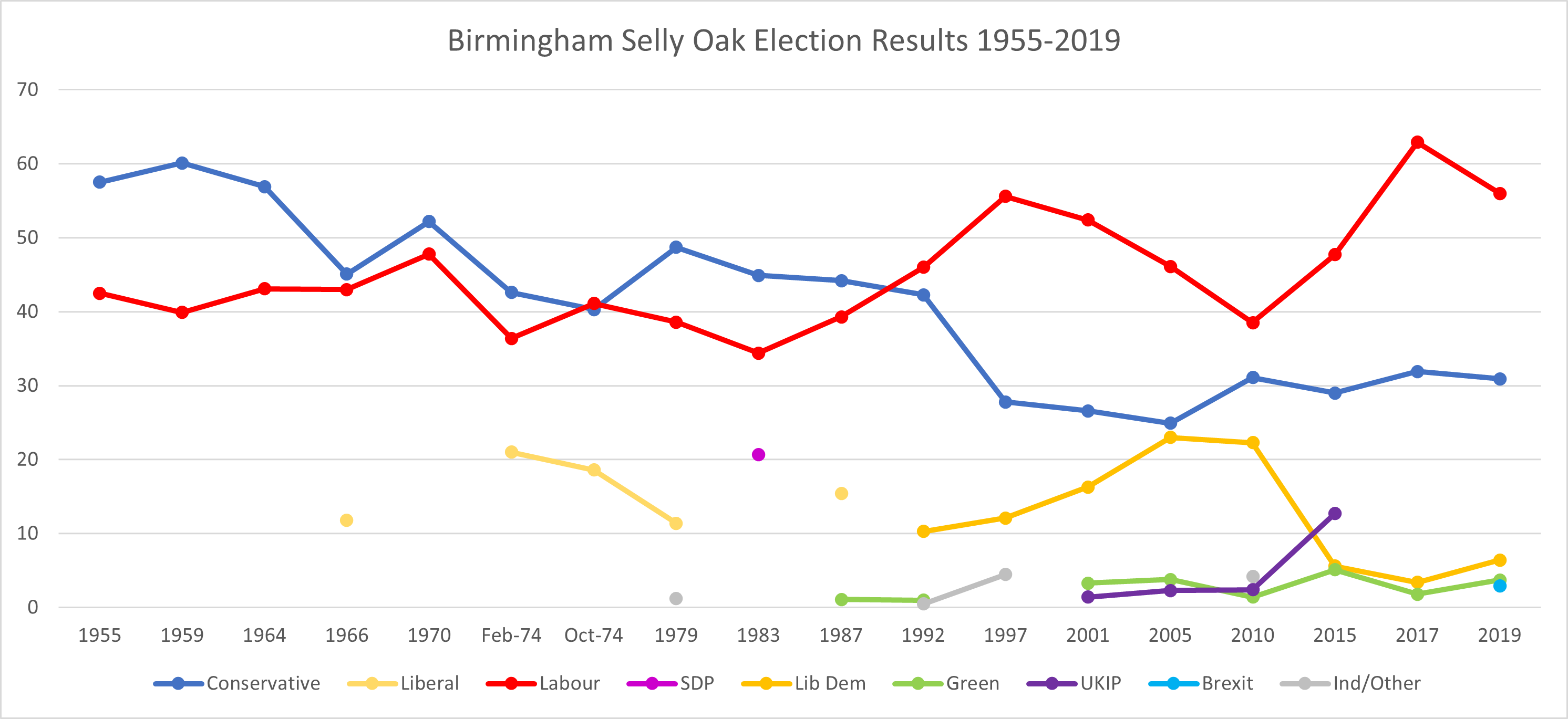

=== Elections in the 2020s ===
General election 2024: Birmingham Selly Oak
Party	Candidate	Votes	%	±%
Labour	Al Carns	17,371	45.2	▼10.5
Conservative	Simon Phipps	5,834	15.2	▼16.4
Reform	Erin Crawford	5,732	14.9	▲12.2
Green	Jane Baston	4,320	11.2	▲7.5
Independent	Kamel Hawwash	2,842	7.4	New
Liberal Democrats	David Radcliffe	2,324	6.0	▼0.2
Majority		11,537	30.1	
Turnout		38,423	50.8	▼12.6
Registered electors		75,678		
Labour hold		Swing	▲3.0	

=== Elections in the 2010s ===
General election 2019: Birmingham Selly Oak
Party	Candidate	Votes	%	±%
Labour	Steve McCabe	27,714	56.0	−6.9
Conservative	Hannah Campbell	15,300	30.9	−1.0
Liberal Democrats	David Radcliffe	3,169	6.4	+3.0
Green	Joe Peacock	1,848	3.7	+1.9
Brexit Party	Joseph Tawonezvi	1,436	2.9	New
Majority		12,414	25.1	−5.9
Turnout		49,467	59.8	−6.1
Registered electors		82,665		
Labour hold		Swing		

General election 2017: Birmingham Selly Oak
Party	Candidate	Votes	%	±%
Labour	Steve McCabe	30,836	62.9	+15.2
Conservative	Sophie Shrubsole	15,629	31.9	+2.9
Liberal Democrats	David Radcliffe	1,644	3.4	−2.2
Green	Julien Pritchard	876	1.8	−3.3
Majority		15,207	31.0	+12.3
Turnout		48,985	65.9	+5.6
Labour hold		Swing	+6.2	

General election 2015: Birmingham, Selly Oak
Party	Candidate	Votes	%	±%
Labour	Steve McCabe	21,584	47.7	+9.2
Conservative	Alex Boulter	13,137	29.0	−2.1
UKIP	Steven Brookes	5,755	12.7	+10.3
Liberal Democrats	Colin Green	2,517	5.6	−16.7
Green	Clare Thomas	2,301	5.1	+3.7
Majority		8,447	18.7	+11.3
Turnout		45,294	60.3	−1.9
Labour hold		Swing	+5.6	

General election 2010: Birmingham, Selly Oak
Party	Candidate	Votes	%	±%
Labour	Steve McCabe	17,950	38.5	–8.3
Conservative	Nigel Dawkins	14,468	31.1	+1.4
Liberal Democrats	David Radcliffe	10,371	22.3	+4.9
BNP	Lynette Orton	1,820	3.9	New
UKIP	Jeffrey Burgess	1,131	2.4	–0.1
Green	James Burn	664	1.4	−2.2
Christian	Samuel Leeds	159	0.3	New
Majority		3,482	7.5	–9.5
Turnout		46,563	62.2	+1.9
Registered electors		74,805		+1,673
Labour hold		Swing	–4.8	

2005 notional result
Party	Vote	%
Labour	20,672	46.8
Conservative	13,108	29.7
Liberal Democrats	7,651	17.3
Green	1,594	3.6
UKIP	1,106	2.5
Turnout	44,131	60.3
Electorate	73,132	

=== Elections in the 2000s ===
General election 2005: Birmingham Selly Oak
Party	Candidate	Votes	%	±%
Labour	Lynne Jones	19,226	46.1	−6.3
Conservative	Joe Tildesley	10,375	24.9	−1.7
Liberal Democrats	Richard Brighton	9,591	23.0	+6.7
Green	Barney Smith	1,581	3.8	+0.5
UKIP	Ronan Burnett	967	2.3	+0.9
Majority		8,851	21.2	−4.6
Turnout		41,740	59.5	+3.2
Labour hold		Swing	−2.3	

General election 2001: Birmingham Selly Oak
Party	Candidate	Votes	%	±%
Labour	Lynne Jones	21,015	52.4	−3.2
Conservative	Kenneth Hardeman	10,676	26.6	−1.2
Liberal Democrats	David Osborne	6,532	16.3	+4.2
Green	Barney Smith	1,309	3.3	New
UKIP	Sheila Williams	568	1.4	New
Majority		10,339	25.8	−2.0
Turnout		40,100	56.3	−13.8
Labour hold		Swing	−1.0	

=== Elections in the 1990s ===
General election 1997: Birmingham Selly Oak
Party	Candidate	Votes	%	±%
Labour	Lynne Jones	28,121	55.6	+9.6
Conservative	Graham Greene	14,033	27.8	−14.5
Liberal Democrats	David Osborne	6,121	12.1	+1.8
Referendum	Laurence Marshall	1,520	3.0	New
ProLife Alliance	Greg Gardner	417	0.8	New
Monster Raving Loony	Peter Sheriff-Knowles	253	0.5	New
Natural Law	Huw Meads	85	0.2	−0.1
Majority		14,088	27.8	+24.1
Turnout		50,550	70.1	−6.5
Labour hold		Swing	+12.1	

General election 1992: Birmingham, Selly Oak
Party	Candidate	Votes	%	±%
Labour	Lynne Jones	25,430	46.0	+6.7
Conservative	Anthony Beaumont-Dark	23,370	42.3	−1.9
Liberal Democrats	David Osborne	5,679	10.3	New
Green	Paul Slatter	535	1.0	−0.2
Natural Law	Christopher Barwood	178	0.3	New
Revolutionary Communist	Kenan Malik	84	0.2	New
Majority		2,060	3.7	N/A
Turnout		55,276	76.6	+3.5
Labour gain from Conservative		Swing	+4.3	

=== Elections in the 1980s ===
General election 1987: Birmingham Selly Oak
Party	Candidate	Votes	%	±%
Conservative	Anthony Beaumont-Dark	23,305	44.2	−0.7
Labour	Albert Bore	20,721	39.3	+4.9
Liberal	Charlotte Cane	8,128	15.4	−5.3
Green	Winifred Hackett	611	1.1	New
Majority		2,584	4.9	−5.6
Turnout		52,765	73.1	+1.6
Conservative hold		Swing	−2.8	

General election 1983: Birmingham Selly Oak
Party	Candidate	Votes	%	±%
Conservative	Anthony Beaumont-Dark	23,008	44.9	−3.8
Labour	John Turner	17,612	34.4	−4.3
SDP	Kevin Wheldall	10,613	20.7	New
Majority		5,396	10.5	+0.5
Turnout		51,233	71.5	
Conservative hold		Swing		

=== Elections in the 1970s ===
General election 1979: Birmingham Selly Oak
Party	Candidate	Votes	%	±%
Conservative	Anthony Beaumont-Dark	23,175	48.7	+8.4
Labour	Tom Litterick	18,400	38.6	−2.5
Liberal	Paul Clifford	5,452	11.4	−7.2
National Front	George Bassett	401	0.8	New
Child and Family Protection Group	Philip Crome	190	0.4	New
Majority		4,775	10.1	N/A
Turnout		47,618	73.7	+3.5
Conservative gain from Labour		Swing	+4.3	

General election October 1974: Birmingham Selly Oak
Party	Candidate	Votes	%	±%
Labour	Tom Litterick	17,320	41.1	+4.7
Conservative	Harold Gurden	16,994	40.3	−2.3
Liberal	Roger Austin Grant	7,850	18.6	−2.4
Majority		326	0.8	N/A
Turnout		42,164	67.2	−7.0
Labour gain from Conservative		Swing	+3.0	

General election February 1974: Birmingham Selly Oak
Party	Candidate	Votes	%	±%
Conservative	Harold Gurden	19,705	42.6	−9.6
Labour	Tom Litterick	16,823	36.4	−11.4
Liberal	Roger Austin Grant	9,718	21.0	New
Majority		2,882	6.2	+1.8
Turnout		46,246	74.2	+10.2
Conservative hold		Swing	+1.0	

General election 1970: Birmingham Selly Oak
Party	Candidate	Votes	%	±%
Conservative	Harold Gurden	18,281	52.2	+7.0
Labour	Michael John Hartley-Brewer	16,758	47.8	+4.8
Majority		1,523	4.4	+2.3
Turnout		35,039	64.0	−2.4
Conservative hold		Swing	+1.1	

=== Elections in the 1960s ===
General election 1966: Birmingham Selly Oak
Party	Candidate	Votes	%	±%
Conservative	Harold Gurden	16,533	45.1	−11.8
Labour	John Garwell	15,756	43.0	−0.1
Liberal	Roy Lewthwaite	4,333	11.8	New
Majority		777	2.1	−11.7
Turnout		36,622	66.4	+0.1
Conservative hold		Swing	−6.0	

General election 1964: Birmingham Selly Oak
Party	Candidate	Votes	%	±%
Conservative	Harold Gurden	21,443	56.9	−3.2
Labour	John Garwell	16,232	43.1	+3.2
Majority		5,211	13.8	−6.4
Turnout		37,675	66.3	−5.3
Conservative hold		Swing	− 3.1	

=== Elections in the 1950s ===
General election 1959: Birmingham Selly Oak
Party	Candidate	Votes	%	±%
Conservative	Harold Gurden	24,950	60.1	+ 2.6
Labour	J Oliver Rhydderch	16,594	39.9	−2.6
Majority		8,356	20.2	+5.2
Turnout		41,544	71.6	−2.7
Conservative hold		Swing	+2.6	

General election 1955: Birmingham Selly Oak
Party	Candidate	Votes	%
Conservative	Harold Gurden	25,774	57.5
Labour	Harry Watton	19,054	42.5
Majority		6,720	15.0
Turnout		44,828	74.3
Conservative win (new seat)			

== See also ==
- List of parliamentary constituencies in the West Midlands (county)
- List of parliamentary constituencies in West Midlands (region)
