= Cookhill =

Village in Worcestershire, England

Coordinates: 52.2284°N 1.9262°W

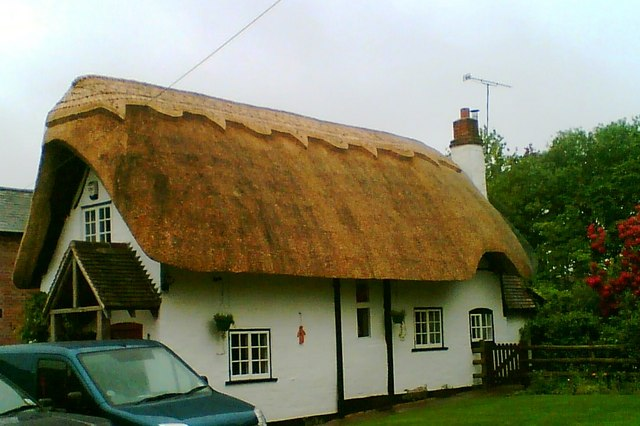

- Location within Worcestershire
- Population: 1,174 (2021)
- OS grid reference: SP053588
- Civil parish: Cookhill
- District: Wychavon
- Shire county: Worcestershire
- Region: West Midlands
- Country: England
- Sovereign state: United Kingdom
- Post town: ALCESTER
- Postcode district: B49
- Police: West Mercia
- Fire: Hereford and Worcester
- Ambulance: West Midlands
- UK Parliament: Redditch

Cookhill is a village and civil parish in Worcestershire, England, on the county border near Alcester. It is close to a former Cistercian priory of the same name. The population was 1,174 in 2021.

== History ==
In the Domesday Book; Cookhill is mentioned as being in the Hundred of Ash in the County of Worcestershire. The total population was of five households - 2 smallholders, 2 slaves and 1 burgess.

== Notable houses ==
- Cookhill Priory
- Dragon Farm

== Churches ==
- St. Paul's, Church Lane.

Consecrated into the Church of England on the 26th October 1876 in a service led by the Lord Bishop of Worcester, St Paul's on Church Lane is a simple stone-built church with seating for around 200 worshipers.

- Baptist Chapel, Chapel lane.

== Politics ==
Cookhill has been represented since 4th July 2024 by Chris Bloore of the Labour Party as part of the Redditch County Constituency, and is part of the South Redditch ward of Worcestershire County Council represented by Conservative Cllr. Anthony Hopkins. Representatives on Wychavon District Council are Cllr's Audrey Steel and David Wilkinson.

== Roads ==
Within the village the major roads are; Salt Way, Brandheath Lane, Wood Lane, Church Lane (leading onto Cladswell Lane, Mearse Lane and Dogbut Lane), Chamberlain Lane, Oaktree Lane and Chapel Lane, all running off the A441 main Evesham Road. The A441 used to continue beyond the junction with the A422 towards Evesham but this has been downgraded to the B4088. The village is served by bus service 149 Worcester–Redditch operated by Diamond. This previously continued to Birmingham as service 150.

== Public houses ==
- The Nevill Arms, at New End, north of Cookhill village.

== Notable residents ==
- Sidney Meteyard (1868–1947), artist
- Kate Eadie (1880–1945), jeweller
