= Brandwood End =

Coordinates: 52.417161°N 1.897776°W

Brandwood End is a locality in Birmingham, England, and makes up the central part of the Brandwood electoral ward. It lies within the B14 postcode and is a sub-area of Kings Heath. The neighborhood's property values have risen higher in 2023-2024 than the average area in the West Midlands.

The area is centred on Brandwood End Cemetery.
