= Sidney Meteyard =

British artist

Sidney Meteyard RBSA
- Born: 2 November 1868; Stourbridge
- Died: 4 April 1947 (aged 78); Cookhill, Worcestershire
- Resting place: Brandwood End Cemetery, Birmingham
- Education: Birmingham School of Art
- Known for: Painting, stained glass
- Spouses: Lizzie Sarah Wilkes Fairfax Muckley (m. 1892; died 1939); Kate Eadie (m. 1940; died 1945)
- Awards: Royal Birmingham Society of Artists

Sidney Harold Meteyard RBSA (2 November 1868 – 4 April 1947) was an English art teacher, painter and stained-glass designer. A member of the Birmingham Group, he worked in a late Pre-Raphaelite style heavily influenced by Edward Burne-Jones and the Arts and Crafts Movement.

== Life and career ==
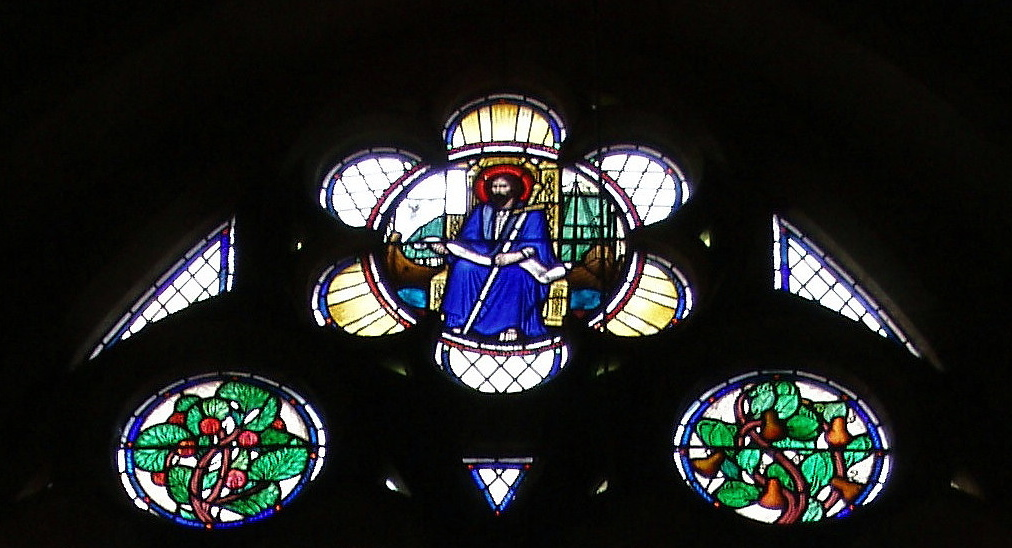
Memorial Window to William Forster and family, at St Paul's, Cookhill. Made in 1933 by Meteyard, probably working with Kate Eadie.

Meteyard was born in Stourbridge, his father was Oswald George Meatyard (d. 4 May 1906) and mother Emma Maria Meatyard, née Rutland (1838–1925). He studied under Edward R. Taylor at the Birmingham School of Art, where he was to later teach for 45 years himself from 1886. He exhibited at the Paris Salon and the Royal Academy from 1900 to 1918, was elected an Associate of the Royal Birmingham Society of Artists in 1902 and made a full member in 1908. He was later their Honorary Secretary.

A friend of William Morris and Edward Burne-Jones, Meteyard worked across a wide variety of media from his studio in Livery Street near Snow Hill station. In 1890 he was one of the pupils at the School of Art to paint a set of murals for Birmingham Town Hall and he later produced works in stained glass, enamel and tempera, and illustrated a number of books including a notable edition of Henry Wadsworth Longfellow's The Golden Legend. He also illustrated the Roll of Honour, in Birmingham's Hall of Memory. In 1907 he made a large single-figure enamel of The Angel of the Resurrection in memory of his father, for Holy Trinity Church, Wordsley.

Meteyard was instrumental in facilitating the donation of Elford Hall to the city of Birmingham.

His first marriage was to Lizzie Sarah Wilkes Fairfax Muckley (d. 9 November 1939) by special licence on 16 April 1892. Shortly after her death he then married in 1940 the jeweller Kate Eadie, a Birmingham School of art student and later fellow RBSA associate, who was also his model.

He suffered with poor eyesight late in life and was blind for his final year. He died on 4 April 1947 at Malt House, Cookhill, Worcestershire and was buried on 11 April at Brandwood End Cemetery, Birmingham, after a service at St Paul's Church, Cookhill.

== Location of work ==
- Birmingham Museum and Art Gallery
- St. Paul’s Church, Cookhill
- British Museum, London
- National Gallery of Canada, Ottawa
- Holy Trinity Church, Wordsley
