= Venetia Stanley =

English beauty

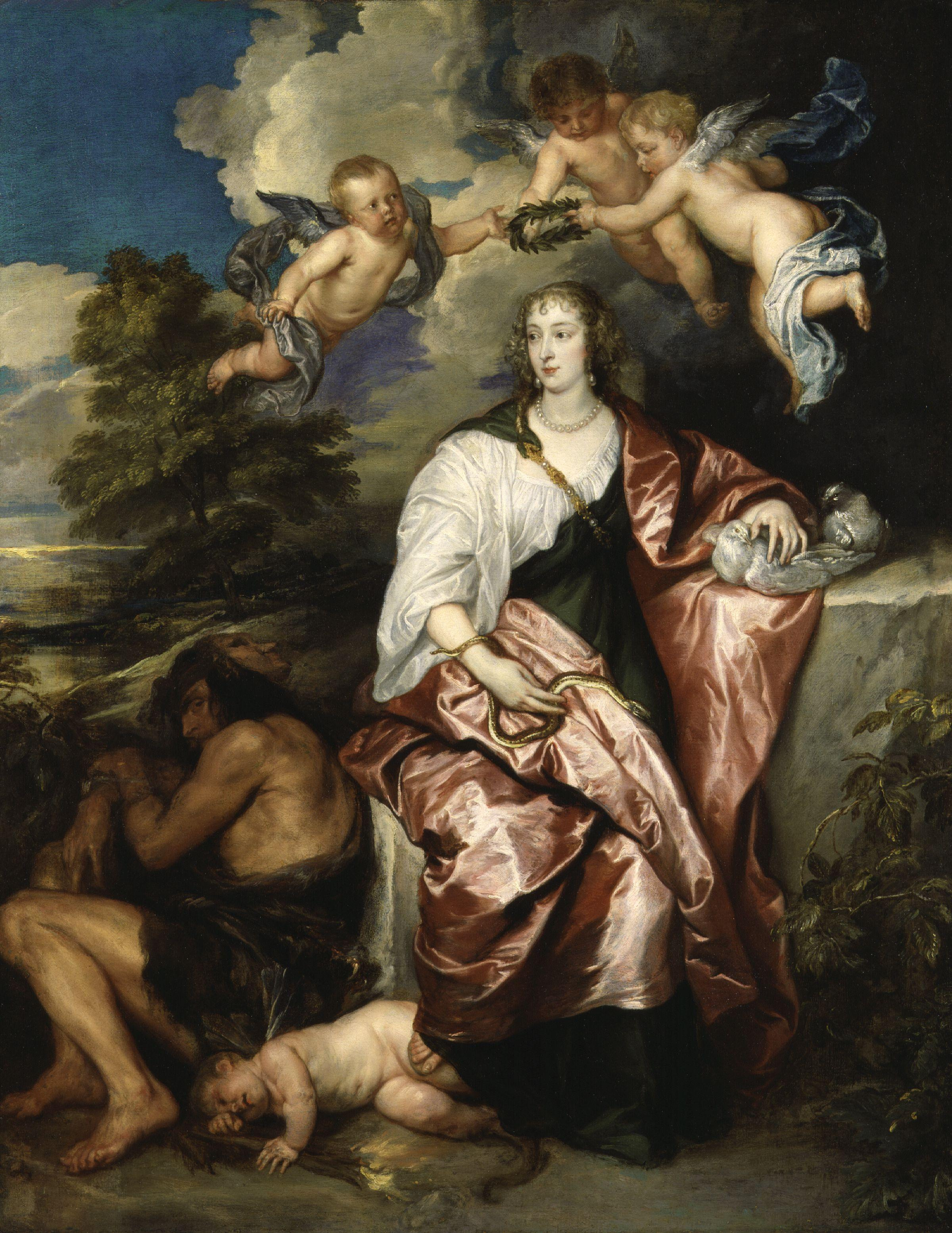
Portrait of Venetia, Lady Digby by Sir Anthony van Dyck.

Venetia Anastasia, Lady Digby (née Stanley; December 1600 – 1 May 1633) was a celebrated beauty of the Stuart period and the wife of a prominent courtier and scientist, Sir Kenelm Digby. She was a granddaughter of Thomas Percy, 7th Earl of Northumberland and a great-granddaughter of Edward Stanley, 3rd Earl of Derby.

== Life ==
Venetia Stanley was the third daughter of Sir Edward Stanley (died c. 1629), of Tong Castle, Shropshire, a baronet (and grandson of Edward Stanley, 3rd Earl of Derby), and Lucy Percy (daughter and co-heiress of the Earl of Northumberland who had been imprisoned for treason for his part in a Catholic plot against Elizabeth I). Lucy Stanley died a few months after giving birth to Venetia. According to The Oxford Dictionary of English Christian Names, "Venetia" is most likely a Latinization of "Gwyneth", not after the Italian city.

A celebrated beauty, Stanley was presented at the court of James I in her teens. At some point around this time she re-encountered Kenelm Digby, whom she had known in childhood, and they fell in love, exchanging a lock of Stanley's hair for a diamond ring from Digby. Digby, not yet of age, was sent off on a Grand Tour of Europe by his mother, who disapproved of the relationship. Later he recorded that in 1620, in Angers, France, he caught the eye of Marie de' Medici, queen mother of France. In order to remove himself from this situation, when fighting broke out in Angers, he let it be understood that he had died, and shortly after he joined the English monarchy’s diplomatic mission to Spain. However in England, Digby’s secret letters of reassurance to Stanley that he was alive were withheld by his mother, and Stanley was overcome with grief.

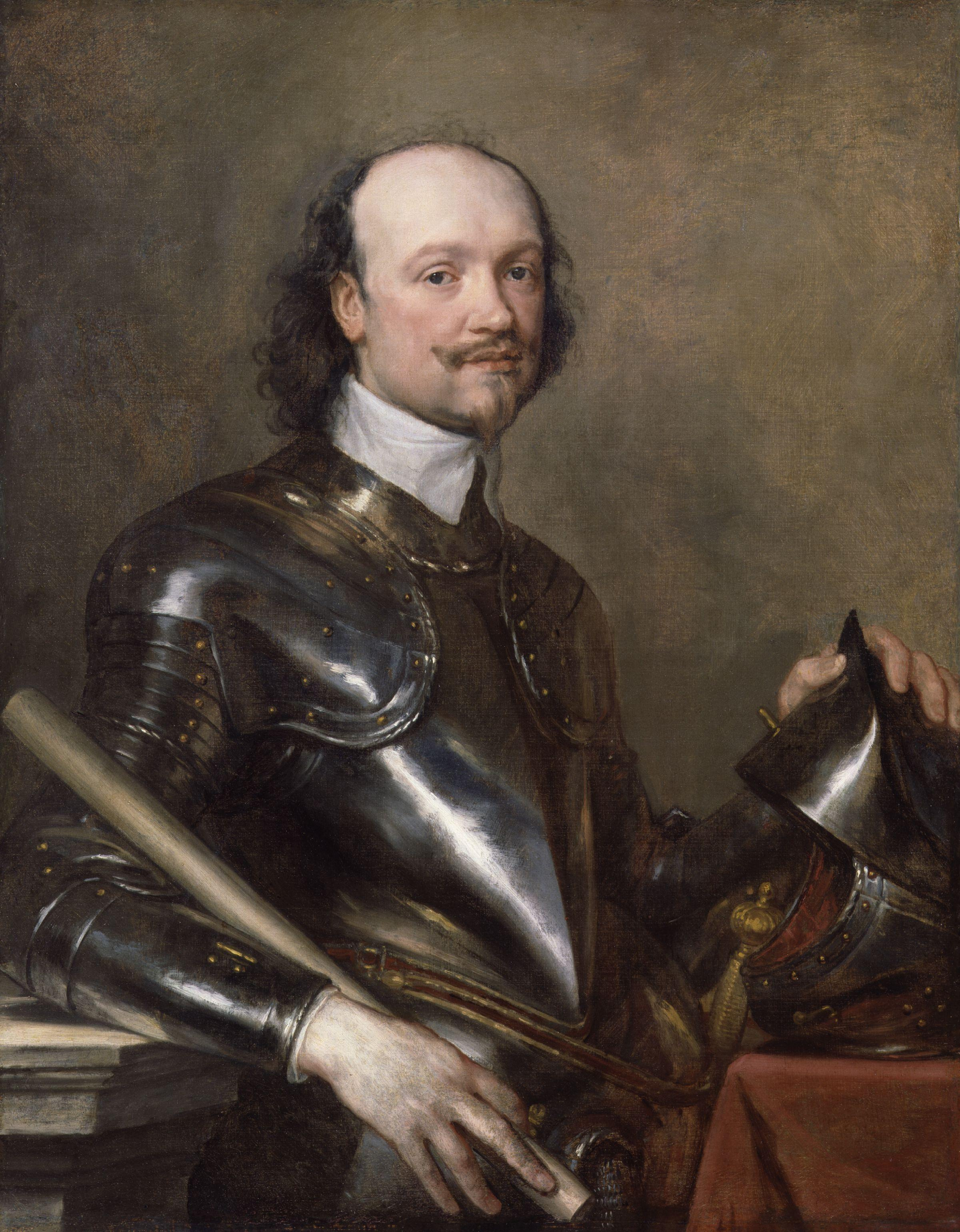
Sir Kenelm Digby by Sir Anthony van Dyck, c. 1640

It may be during this period that her behaviour caused the gossip later reported as fact by the antiquary John Aubrey, who claimed that she was the "concubine" of either the courtier Sir Edmund Wylde or Richard Sackville, Earl of Dorset, the latter of whom, Aubrey said, had children by her and settled upon her an annuity of £500 per annum. However Wylde had died in 1620, before the reports of Digby’s death, and Dorset’s will makes no reference to any children by Stanley, even as twentieth-century biographers refer to their child as fact. Yet John Aubrey’s view of her is the one that has prevailed, such as his report that Digby was supposed to have replied to concerns over Stanley's virtue with the comment that "A handsome lusty man that was discreet might make a virtuous wife out of a brothel-house."

Stanley also had an important relationship with Richard Sackville's younger brother Edward Sackville, who allegedly fought a notable duel over her, yet seems to have remained friends with both her and Kenelm Digby after their marriage.

Digby’s return did not immediately mend the breach caused (on Stanley's side) by Digby’s lack of communication, and (on Digby’s), by rumours of Dorset’s supposed pursuit of Stanley. It was only in 1624, when Digby was attached to the delegation to France, to make arrangements for the soon-to-be King Charles I of England to marry Henrietta Maria, that Stanley sold her jewellery for Digby to use as living expenses, and Digby understood the depth of her feeling for him.

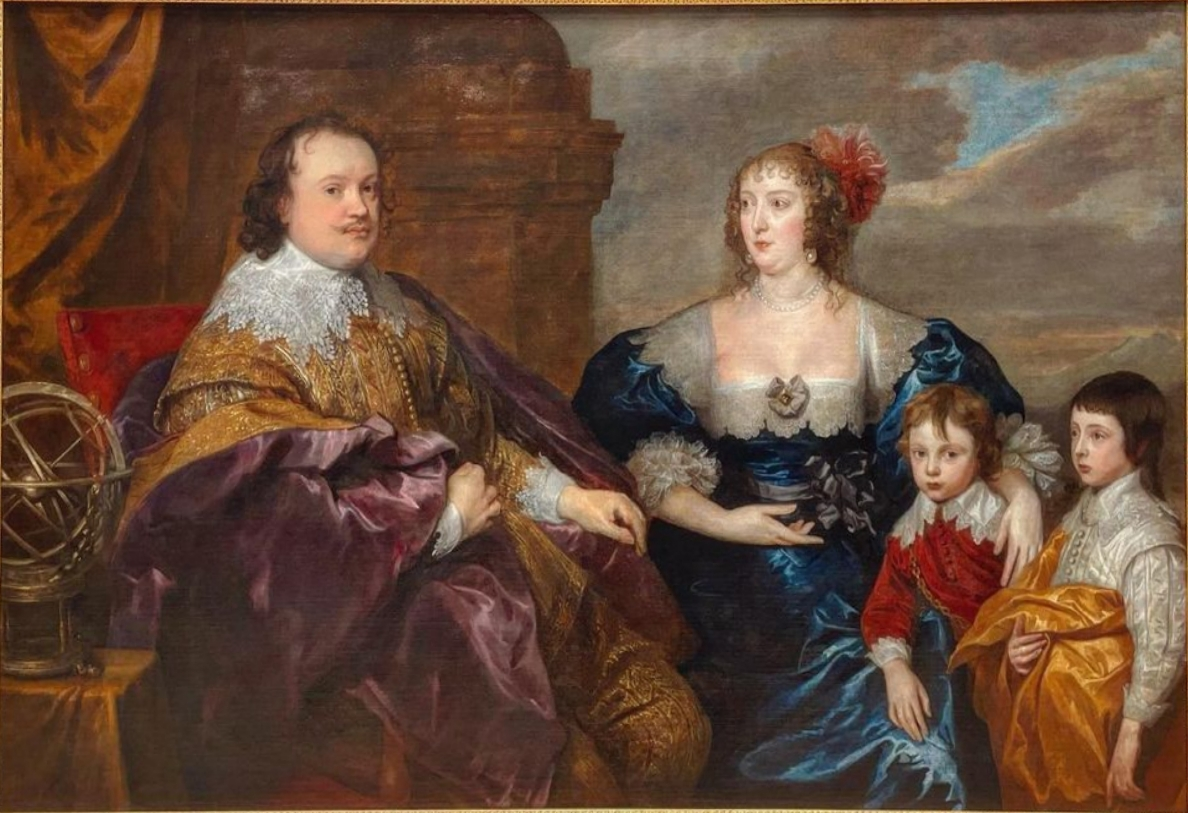
Family portrait of Sir Kenelm Digby and Lady Venetia with their sons Kenelm and John

Digby and Stanley married, most likely in January 1625, in his mother’s absence – she was quarrelling with Lord Stanley, and fears for Stanley's inheritance may have been at the root of the need for secrecy. In another of Digby’s absences on diplomatic missions, in October 1625, Stanley gave birth to their first child, Kenelm, still in secret, with a single servant to attend her. She later bore Digby another three sons, John, George and Everard, the last of whom died in infancy; she also miscarried twins.

Stanley was a devout Catholic. According to her husband, who insisted that she conducted herself "blamelessly" throughout their marriage, she heard Mass daily and prayed for at least several hours a day. She also joined a lay Franciscan group and visited the poor in London. She founded her charity work through a gambling habit, with unusually good luck at the card table and a scheme to save up her profits. She was painted at least three times by Van Dyck in the 1630s: a family portrait, an allegorical portrait as Prudence, and a deathbed portrait, as well as a number of miniatures, including an early one by Isaac Oliver, where she is possibly dressed for a court masque.

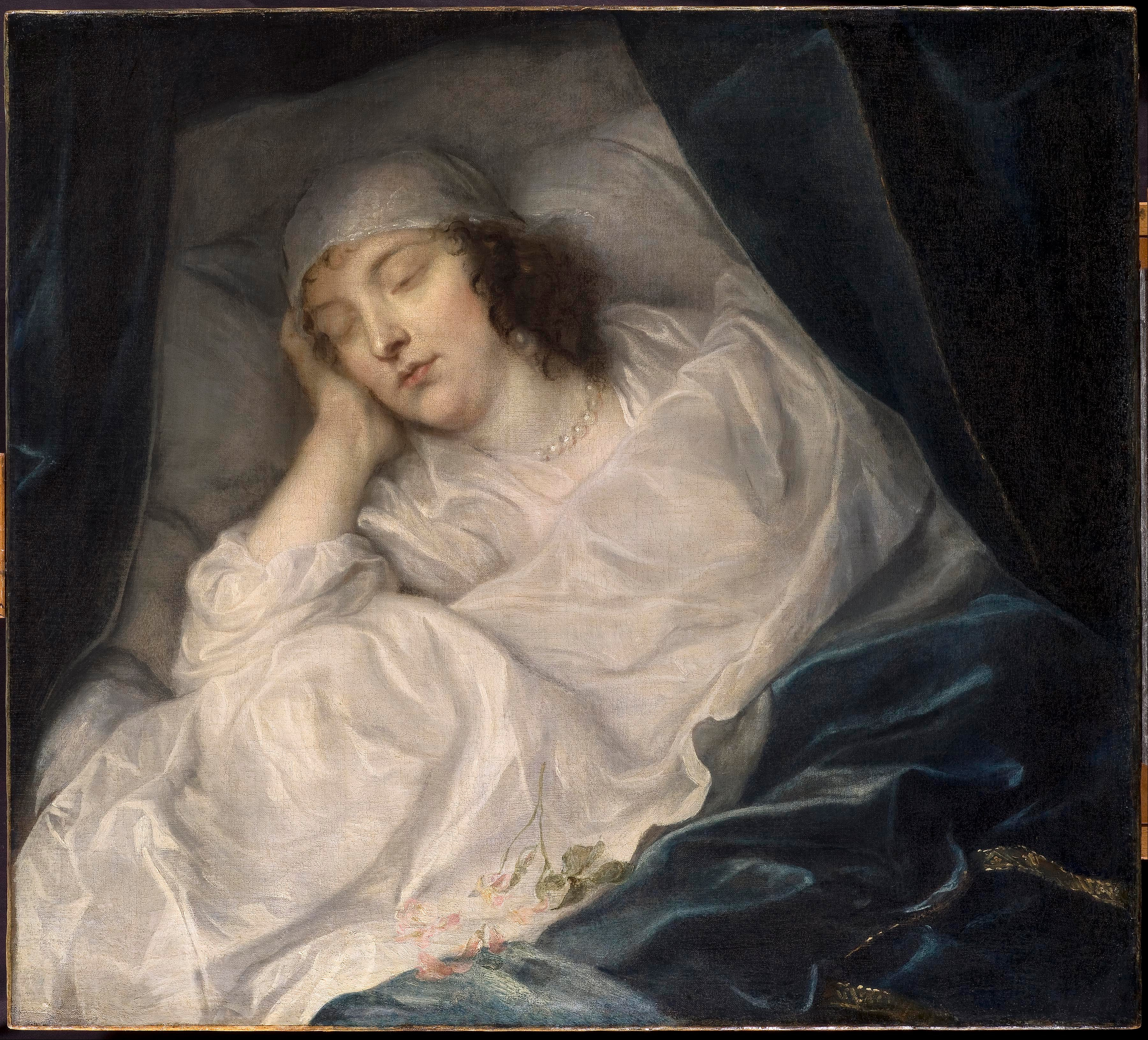
Venetia Stanley on her Deathbed by Van Dyck, 1633. Dulwich Picture Gallery, London.

In April 1633, Venetia died suddenly in her sleep, aged 32. Distraught at her loss, Digby permitted an autopsy, not a routine event at the time. She had, he said, been suffering occasional headaches through the previous eight years, for which she took "viper-wine" (which could have been one of several concoctions involving vipers or their venom in wine, but which is unlikely to have been toxic). The physicians reported finding her brain much putrifyed and corrupted: all the cerebellum was rotten, and retained not the forme of the braine but was meere pus and corrupted matter.

Stanley's death was a tragedy for Digby, probably the defining event of his life. Although he had not been faithful while his wife was alive and he carried out a long relationship with another woman after her death, he never remarried, and the event separated the two great phases of his life: one in which he was a bright young courtier jockeying for position, and one in which he was a melancholy scientist and Catholic apologist. He commissioned plaster casts made of her head, hands, and feet, and had Van Dyck, a good friend, paint Venetia on her deathbed before she was buried at Christchurch, Newgate, in London, in an elaborate tomb of marble topped with a portrait bust.

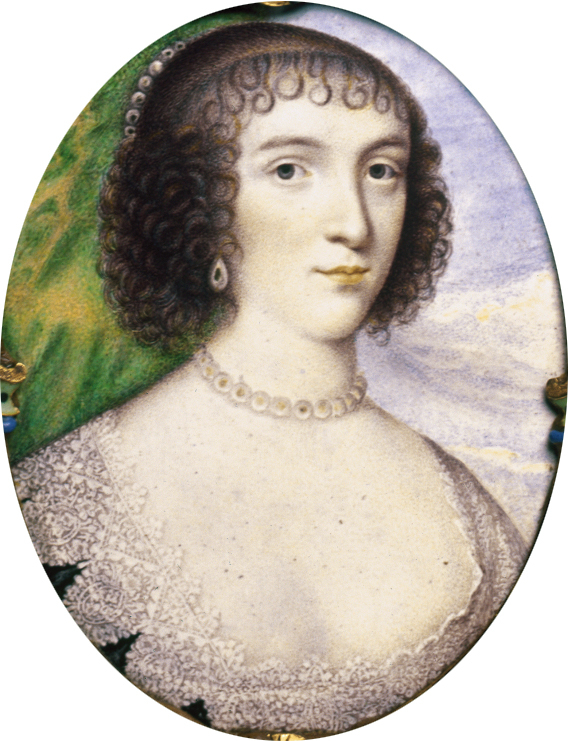
Henri Toutin, posthumous enamel miniature, 1637

Soon after, Digby sent his children to live with their grandmother, and himself moved to Gresham College. There he initially spent his time writing letters eulogizing his wife, which, collected together with verses by Ben Jonson and other poets patronized by Digby, eventually formed a volume titled In Praise of Venetia. Around this time he commissioned a portrait of himself from Van Dyck, bare-headed, bearded, and wearing mourning black. Afterwards, he took up in seriousness the scientific experimentation that he was to be known for through the rest of his life. He lost possession of Stanley's deathbed portrait in one of his flights from England during the English Civil War. (It is now in the Dulwich Picture Gallery in London, and another version is at Althorp.)

Shortly before his death in 1665, Digby included in his will his desire to have his "dust lie by hers who was my greatest worldly blessing", and he was therefore buried in the same black marble and copper tomb Stanley had been buried in three decades earlier. Following his wishes, no inscription was added to hers. Just a year later, the church fell within the area burned in the Great Fire of 1666. John Aubrey later reported seeing in a shop window the gilded bronze bust of Stanley from the top of her tomb, but "the fire had got off all the gilding". Later, he added, the bust was melted down altogether.

Sir Kenelm wrote a "Private Memoir" of their courtship which is one of the major sources of information about her. It uses the pseudonyms Theagenes and Stelliana for the main characters, and Digby appears to have revised it intermittently throughout his life. These Private Memoirs were published in London in 1828, in a bowdlerised form. The cut scenes, mostly sexual in nature, were first privately circulated in a pamphlet, and eventually included as an appendix to a later printing within a year or two of the first publication. The book describes the childhood romance of "Stelliana" and "Theagenes", various obstacles throughout their adolescence, and final union in a secret marriage, after which child is secretly born in Stelliana's father's house. The book ends with Theagenes on a maritime expedition (modelled after Digby's own exploits), looking forward to his return home to his wife and sons.

Yet there is no evidence to verify the document's factual basis. It is not known, for example, the exact identity of "Mardontius," the rival suitor to whom "Stelliana" was engaged during the period in which "Theagenes" was presumed dead. Aubrey attempted to identify him as Richard Sackville, 3rd Earl of Dorset, but the identification does not hold up to any historical examination.

Over the centuries, the most widely disseminated information about Stanley came from John Aubrey's Brief Lives, but Aubrey’s information was hearsay. Vittorio Gabrieli, an Italian scholar, published English-language editions of both In Praise of Venetia and The Private Memoirs in Rome in the second half of the 20th century. An indirect Digby descendant, Roy Digby Thomas, produced a 1956 biography of Sir Kenelm Digby, The Gunpowder Plotter's Legacy, but it contains much now-discredited material.

The Dulwich Picture Gallery's catalogue, Death, Passion, and Politics (ed. Ann Sumner), published in conjunction with their exhibition of Van Dyck's portraits of George Digby and Stanley, also contains some errors (for example, referring to Stanley as impoverished – she was not – and referring to her hair as "somewhat coarse", when Digby specifically stated in his letters that her hair was fine). Nonetheless, it is probably the best current visual resource.

== In literature ==
A.D. Hope's lengthy epistolary poem "Edward Sackville to Venetia Digby" imagines Edward's love for Venetia as an exemplar of what the novelist and literary critic Kerry Greenwood calls, "unrequitable love at its most piercing". The poem opens with Edward addressing the married Stanley: "First, last and always dearest, closest, best,/Source of my travail and my rest,/The letter which I shall not send, I write/To cheer my more than arctic night". Edward Sackville appears as "Mardonius" in Digby's fictionalized account of his and Stanley's marriage.

Venetia Digby and her husband are the subjects of the 2014 literary novel Viper Wine by Hermione Eyre.

== Portraits ==
- Isaac (or Peter?) Oliver, possibly Lady Venetia Stanley, later Digby, c.1615, Victoria and Albert Museum, London
- after Antony van Dyck, double portrait miniature, 1632, Sherborne Old Castle, Dorset
- after Antony van Dyck, double portrait miniature, with Kenelm Digby, Sherborne Old Castle, Dorset
- after Antony van Dyck, family portrait, with children, 1633
- Antony van Dyck, Venetia Stanley on her deathbed, 1633, Dulwich Picture Gallery, London
- Antony van Dyck, portrait, two versions, in Palazzo Reale, Milan; and in the Royal Collection, Windsor
- Henri Toutin, miniature, 1637, Walters Art Museum, Baltimore
- Isaac (or Peter?) Oliver, miniature, n.d.,
