= Anthony Beaumont-Dark =

British politician (1932-2006)

Sir Anthony Michael Beaumont-Dark (11 October 1932 – 2 April 2006) was a British politician.

== Early life and education ==
He was born in Birmingham on 11 October 1932 to Leonard Cecil Dark and Madeline (née Beaumont), who retired to Mundesley, Norfolk. His father was managing director of the Silas Hyde engineering/sheet metal firm in Birmingham, working there for 49 years, and during the Second World War was "one of the men to design the famous block-buster bomb".

Beaumont-Dark was educated at Cedarhurst School, Solihull; Shirley College; Birmingham College of Arts and Crafts; and Birmingham University.

== Career ==
He trained as an investment analyst and became a stockbroker by profession.

He was a Conservative City Councillor for Birmingham from 1956 to 1967, and stood unsuccessfully for Birmingham Aston in 1959 and 1964. Subsequently, he became MP for the constituency of Birmingham Selly Oak from 1979 to 1992. According to The Guardian, he was known for being a "rent-a-quote" MP who would deliver a pithy and memorable comment on almost any public issue.

He defeated Tom Litterick of the Labour Party in 1979, and served as a backbencher until his defeat in the 1992 general election by Lynne Jones, the Labour candidate. He was knighted the same year.

Parliament of the United Kingdom
Preceded by Tom Litterick	Member of Parliament for Birmingham Selly Oak; 1979–1992	Succeeded by Dr. Lynne Jones
