= Brandwood End Cemetery =

Cemetery in Birmingham, West Midlands, England

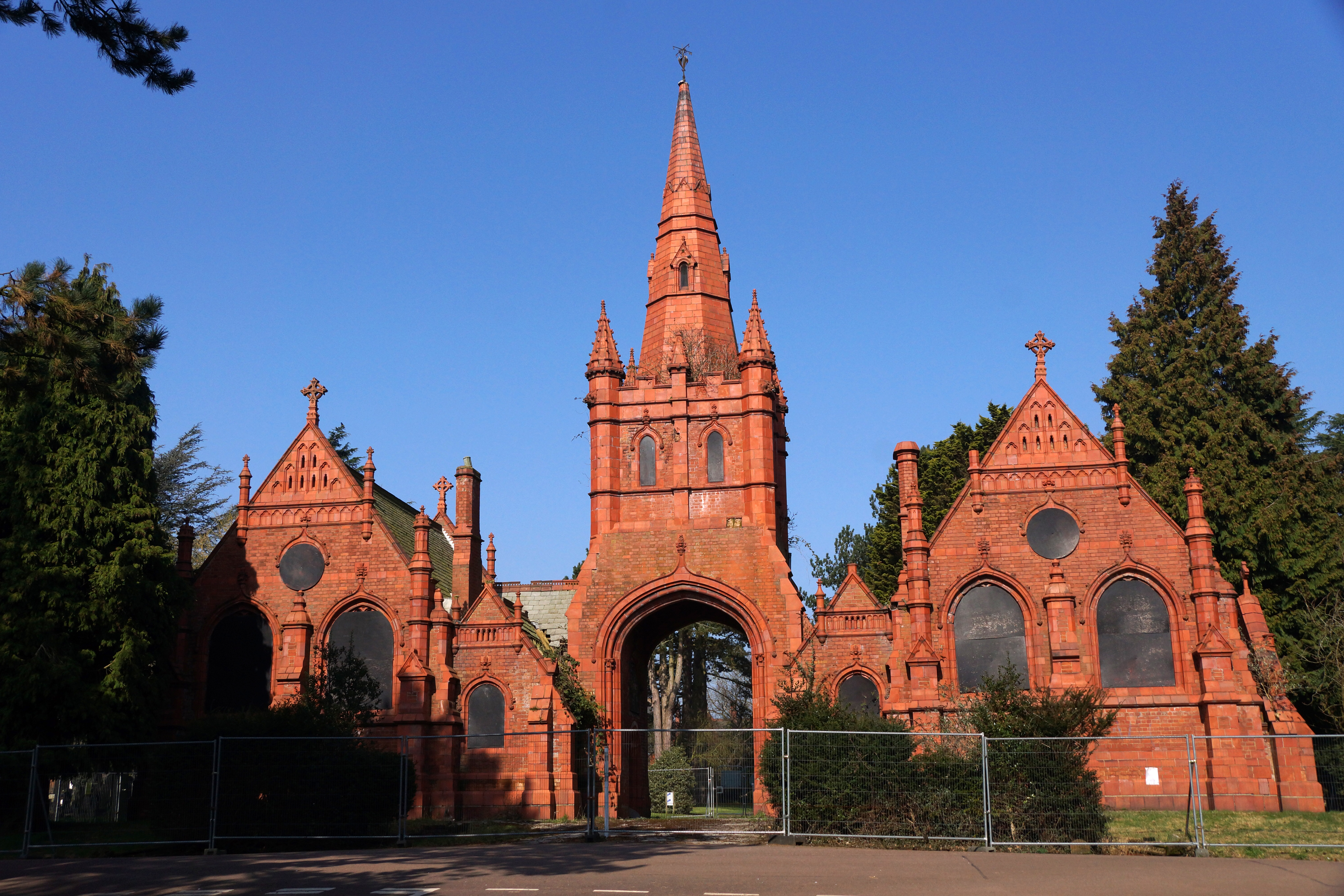
- Entrance and mortuary chapels in March 2015
- Interactive map of Brandwood End Cemetery

Details
- Established: 1899
- Location: Birmingham
- Country: England
- Coordinates: 52.4172°N 1.8978°W
- Owned by: Birmingham City Council
- Size: 53 acres (0.21 km^{2}; 0.083 sq mi)
- Website: birmingham.gov.uk/brandwood-end-cemetery

Brandwood End Cemetery is a cemetery located in the Brandwood ward of Birmingham, England.

== History ==
Until the early 19th century, Church of England churchyards and burial grounds were the only major places available for burial. By that time, these ancient burial grounds were becoming overcrowded, causing burials to become shallower and graveyards to be considered unsanitary health hazards. Added to this was a massive population increase, particularly in expanding urban industrial areas, which increased the demand for burial space. The increased death rate further exacerbated the situation during periodic epidemics such as cholera, occurring unchecked within these overcrowded urban environments.

These burial problems were resolved with the development of ‘public cemeteries for all’. This was initially not directed by local or central government, but by Joint Stock Companies for profit. For example, Key Hill Cemetery in Birmingham's Jewellry Quarter, founded in 1834, was a local example of such a Joint-Stock venture.

However, these private-enterprise efforts could not, by themselves, solve the overall problem. As a direct result of the cholera epidemics of 1831–32 and 1848–49, central government had to act. Between 1852 and 1857, a series of Burial Acts were passed, establishing a national system of public cemeteries under the direction of local Burial Boards. These Boards were responsible for the interment of the dead, could build and manage new cemeteries, and charged the expenses to the Poor Rate.

In the late 19th century, King's Norton Rural District Council was one of the largest administrative districts surrounding Birmingham. As Birmingham expanded in the 1880s and its population increasingly settled in this parish due to the new rail and tram routes, it created increasing pressure on the existing church burial grounds. Like others across the country, these were full and unable to expand. To resolve this problem under the new legislation, the Kings Norton RDC resolved to establish a cemetery in the north of the district, where population growth was greatest. Still, they had difficulty finding a suitable site.

In 1892, the first plan was to build a cemetery in Billesley, in the parish of Yardley, but this was abandoned due to objections by the Yardley authorities. In 1895, an area of farmland was finally acquired to build a new cemetery in Brandwood End, near Kings Heath, within the parish of Kings Norton.

Brandwood End Cemetery was therefore one of the later Victorian Cemeteries, and was formally opened on 13 April 1899, by Mr George Tallis, the Chairman of the Local Cemetery Committee; the cemetery being subsequently incorporated within the City of Birmingham in 1911, under the Greater Birmingham Act, when the city expanded its boundaries.

The two semi-detached mortuary chapels stand at the highest point in the cemetery grounds and provide a dramatic central focus. The chapels are joined by a carriage entrance archway (a porte-cochere), surmounted by a tower and spire. The twin chapels were designed by Mr J. Brewin Holmes, a Birmingham architect, and are built in the Gothic style with Art Nouveau details from red brick and terracotta. The mortuary chapel on the east was for Non-conformists, and the chapel on the west was consecrated for Anglican services. The chapels are mirror images of each other, containing: a chancel, a coffin chamber, a vestry and an underground heating chamber. There is also a Cemetery Lodge, built from red brick and terracotta, which contained the cemetery offices and living quarters for the cemetery Superintendent.

The plans for the original cemetery, drawn up by the Birmingham District Surveyor, are a classic example of the Victorian grid plan design for a cemetery. It contained a grand, tree-lined central driveway running north to south through the cemetery grounds, passing beneath the carriageway arch between the two mortuary chapels. Subsidiary pathways run east to west, at right angles to the grand central driveway, and divide the cemetery into its various Sections. Later extensions to the cemetery grounds: to the west in 1915; to the east in 1917, 1920 and 1950; and two further purchases of small parcels of ground in 1967 and 1996, continued to follow this original grid plan, maintaining the original Victorian layout.

The landscape was a very important aspect of Victorian cemetery design, and Brandwood End was planted with a mixture of evergreen and deciduous trees that were popular at the time. Evergreens are concentrated within the original area of land obtained in 1885 and consist of avenues of Scots pines, cypress trees, and Wellingtonia. The dark green foliage was deliberately planted to present a striking contrast to the red terracotta chapels. The deciduous planting included Horse-Chestnut, Beech, Hornbeam, and Poplar, added to existing Oak trees.

While this was a cemetery for everyone, the most impressive funerary monuments are those grouped around the mortuary chapels, where the local ‘great and the good’ purchased their grave plots. These illustrate a range of early twentieth-century styles, including Edwardian Italian marble angels and the Art Deco memorials of the 1930s.

In 1929, a ‘Cross of Sacrifice' was erected in the main central driveway to commemorate those who died in the First World War, and below this, to the east of the drive, a Memorial Garden was laid out in 1952, in memory of the Civilian War dead from the Second World War who are buried in this cemetery. There are in all 206 British Commonwealth service war graves (108 from the First World War, 98 from the Second) in this cemetery, besides 2 Polish war graves.

For the local historian, all these ‘new’ Victorian cemeteries, whether privately or publicly constructed, are not simply new burial grounds built to answer a burial problem, but a reflection of the attitude of our Victorian and Edwardian predecessors to death and their cherished memory of the departed.

From this 'culture of commemoration' we gain these beautifully landscaped cemeteries, with their Gothic buildings and funerary monuments, which are now treasured open spaces within our 21st-century urban environment. Many of these Victorian cemeteries, including Brandwood End Cemetery, are listed in English Heritage's National Register of Parks and Gardens of Special Historic Interest in England, and many of the Victorian cemetery buildings are listed on the Statutory List of Buildings of Special Architectural or Historic Interest.

Brandwood End Cemetery is listed as Grade II in both the above registers reflecting its historical value.

The Victorian Society has named it a heritage building at risk of disrepair.

== Notable interments ==
- Alderman John Bowen JP (1844–1926)
- Kate Eadie (1880–1945), designer
- Sidney Meteyard (1868–1947), artist
- Patrick Waite (1968–1993), musician of reggae pop group Musical Youth
- Ursula O'Leary (1926–1993), actress

== Friends ==
The Friends of Brandwood End Cemetery (FBEC) arose from community interest in maintaining this historic landscaped Victorian Cemetery, which is also a valued green open space within an urban setting. The group officially commenced its activities following an inaugural meeting on 21 July 2005, when its Constitution was agreed, and an Executive Committee was elected at a well-attended public meeting.

It has the full non-political support of the local Birmingham City Councilors for the area and is a registered charity, number 1114333.

The objectives of The Friends are to promote, for the benefit of the local community and others, the restoration, conservation, and respectful enjoyment of Brandwood End Cemetery and Chapels, including monuments, buildings, records, green spaces, the adjacent pool and allotments, and the overall environment.

In June 2011, it was announced that comedian Alistair McGowan, who has over 30 members of his extended family interred at Brandwood, had become a Patron of the friends.
