= Tom Litterick =

British politician (1929–1981)

Thomas Litterick (25 May 1929 – 6 January 1981) was a British Labour Party politician, on the left wing of the party.

Educated at the Dundee School of Economics and the University of St Andrews, Litterick was elected Member of Parliament for the previously Conservative seat of Birmingham Selly Oak in October 1974 general election, having unsuccessfully contested it in the election eight months earlier. However, he lost to the Conservative Anthony Beaumont-Dark at the 1979 general election.

On the first day of the October Labour Party conference of that year, Litterick gave a speech criticising James Callaghan (who remained Labour leader despite having lost the Prime Ministry). Waving a clutch of policy papers which he claimed Callaghan had vetoed, he quoted from a popular television series featuring Jimmy Savile: ""Jim will fix it", they said. Ay, he fixed it. He fixed all of us. He fixed me in particular." Delegates roared with approval and Tony Benn described it as a "courageous speech".

Litterick died in 1981 aged 51.

Parliament of the United Kingdom
Preceded by Harold Gurden	Member of Parliament for Birmingham Selly Oak; Oct 1974–1979	Succeeded by Anthony Beaumont-Dark
