= Aubrey Jones =

British politician (1911–2003)

The Right Honourable Aubrey Jones
- Jones in 1951

Member of Parliament for Birmingham Hall Green
- In office 1950–1965
- Preceded by: New constituency
- Succeeded by: Sir Reginald Eyre

Minister of Fuel and Power
- In office 20 Dec 1957 – 13 Jan 1959
- Preceded by: Geoffrey Lloyd
- Succeeded by: Percy Mills

Personal details
- Born: 20 November 1911 Penydarren, Merthyr Tydfil, Wales
- Died: 10 April 2003 (aged 91)
- Party: Conservative; Liberal
- Education: Cyfarthfa Castle Secondary School, Merthyr Tydfil
- Alma mater: London School of Economics
- Military career
- Allegiance: United Kingdom
- Branch: British Army
- Service years: 1939-45
- Units: Intelligence Corps; Secret Intelligence Service
- Conflicts: World War II; Allied invasion of Italy

Aubrey Jones (20 November 1911 – 10 April 2003) was a British Conservative politician who served as Member of Parliament for Birmingham Hall Green from 1950 to 1965.

== Early life ==
Jones was born in Penydarren. He attended Cyfarthfa Castle Secondary School in Merthyr Tydfil and later graduated with a first-class degree from the London School of Economics, where he won the Gladstone Memorial Prize. During his time at university he joined the Liberal Party, only to leave "after having heard a speech by Sir Archibald Sinclair." Soon after graduation he found employment as a "secretary-cum-research assistant" to the Foreign Secretary, Sir John Simon. He was to undertake further work as a research assistant at the League of Nations in Geneva before moving on to journalism. An initial stint as a reporter for the Western Mail led, in 1937, to his recruitment by The Times, where he worked firstly as a sub-editor and then, two years later, as a correspondent in Berlin. Following the outbreak of the Second World War he was recruited into the Intelligence Corps and soon transferred to Section V of the Secret Intelligence Service. He was posted to Bari after the Allied invasion of Italy.

== Career ==
At the 1950 general election, he was elected as the first Member of Parliament (MP) for the new constituency of Birmingham Hall Green. He was Minister of Fuel and Power from 1955 to 1957, and the last Minister of Supply from 1957 to 1959. He resigned from the House of Commons in 1965 in order to take up the position of Chairman of the newly created Prices & Incomes Board. He received an Honorary degree (Doctor of Science) from the University of Bath in 1966.

After leaving the Prices and Incomes Board in October 1970, he became chair of Laporte Industries and a director of Thomas Tilling, Cornhill Insurance and Black & Decker.

At the 1983 general election, he stood as the Liberal candidate for Sutton Coldfield, having rejoined the party in 1980 after a hiatus of nearly fifty years.

== Published works ==
- The Pendulum of Politics, 1946
- If Steel is Nationalised, 1949
- Industrial Order, 1950
- The New Inflation: the politics of prices and incomes, 1973
- Economics and Equality (editor), 1976
- My LSE (contribution), 1977
- The End of the Keynesian Era (contribution), 1977
- Oil: the missed opportunity, 1981
- Britain’s Economy: the roots of stagnation, 1985

== Sources ==
- Leigh Rayment's Peerage Pages

Parliament of the United Kingdom
New constituency	Member of Parliament for Birmingham Hall Green; 1950–1965	Succeeded by Sir Reginald Eyre
