= Reginald Eyre =

British politician (1924–2019)

Sir Reginald Eyre

Comptroller of the Household
- In office 1970–1972
- Preceded by: Walter Elliot
- Succeeded by: Bernard Weatherill

Member of Parliament for Birmingham Hall Green
- In office 6 May 1965 – 18 May 1987
- Preceded by: Aubrey Jones
- Succeeded by: Andrew Hargreaves

Personal details
- Born: Reginald Edwin Eyre; 28 May 1924
- Died: 27 January 2019 (aged 94)
- Party: Conservative
- Children: Hermione Eyre
- Education: Emmanuel College, Cambridge

Sir Reginald Edwin Eyre (28 May 1924 – 27 January 2019) was a British Conservative Party politician.

== Early life and career ==
Son of Edwin Eyre, a local government officer, and his wife Mary (née Moseley), a shopkeeper, Eyre was educated at King Edward VI Camp Hill School, Birmingham, and Emmanuel College, Cambridge, before becoming a Birmingham solicitor, and admitted in 1950.

== Career in politics ==
He contested Birmingham Northfield in 1959. Eyre was elected Member of Parliament for Birmingham Hall Green at a 1965 by-election, and represented the seat until he retired in 1987. During the Edward Heath and Margaret Thatcher governments, he served as Lord Commissioner of the Treasury, Comptroller of the Household, and junior Environment (Housing and Construction), and Trade and Transport Minister. He was also a vice-chairman of the Conservative Party.

Eyre died in January 2019 at the age of 94. His daughter, from his second marriage, Hermione Eyre, is an editor at the London Evening Standard, and a novelist. She is married to Conservative MP Alex Burghart.

Parliament of the United Kingdom
Preceded by Aubrey Jones	Member of Parliament for Birmingham Hall Green; 1965–1987	Succeeded by Andrew Hargreaves
Political offices
Preceded by Walter Elliot	Comptroller of the Household; 1970–1972	Succeeded by Bernard Weatherill
