= Birmingham Hall Green =

Parliamentary constituency in the United Kingdom, 1950–2024

- Former borough constituency for the House of Commons
- 2010–2024 boundary of Birmingham Hall Green in Birmingham

- Location of Birmingham within England
- County: West Midlands
- Population: 115,904 (2011 census)
- Electorate: 77,157 (December 2010)

1950–2024
- Seats: One
- Created from: Birmingham Acock's Green and Birmingham Moseley
- Replaced by: Birmingham Hall Green and Moseley

Birmingham Hall Green was a parliamentary constituency in the city of Birmingham, represented in the House of Commons of the UK Parliament from 2019 to 2024 by Tahir Ali of the Labour Party. Under the 2023 review of Westminster constituencies, the constituency was abolished and replaced by the new constituency of Birmingham Hall Green and Moseley with minor boundary changes. It was first contested at the 2024 general election, with Ali being re-elected for the new seat.

It was a safe seat for Labour, having the twelfth-largest majority in the UK (by percentage) with a vote share for Labour of 77.6% and majority of 62.5%, as of 2017. This is compared to only a 32.9% share of the vote and 7.8% majority that Labour achieved in 2010.

== Boundaries ==
Map of 2010-2024 boundaries

1950–1955: The County Borough of Birmingham wards of Hall Green, Sparkhill and Springfield.

1955–1974: The County Borough of Birmingham wards of Brandwood, Hall Green, and Springfield.

1974–1983: The County Borough of Birmingham wards of Billesley, Brandwood, and Hall Green.

1983–1997: The City of Birmingham wards of Billesley, Brandwood, and Hall Green (as they existed on 1 February 1983).

1997–2010: The City of Birmingham wards of Billesley, Brandwood, and Hall Green (as they existed on 1 June 1994).

2010–2024: The City of Birmingham wards of Hall Green, Moseley and King's Heath, Sparkbrook, and Springfield (as they existed on 12 April 2005).

Under the Fifth periodic review of Westminster constituencies, the Boundary Commission for England created a significantly modified version of the Hall Green seat which contained only a third of the constituency which existed for the 1997 general election, being the ward of Hall Green itself. The majority of the newly drawn constituency comprised the two wards of Sparkbrook and Springfield from the Birmingham, Sparkbrook and Small Heath constituency which was abolished at the 2010 general election. Moseley and King's Heath were transferred in from Birmingham, Selly Oak which now included Billesley and Brandwood.

Further to the 2023 review of Westminster constituencies which came into effect for the 2024 general election, the Boundary Commission abolished the constituency and created the new seat of Birmingham Hall Green and Moseley with similar boundaries (minor gains and losses to Birmingham Ladywood, Birmingham Selly Oak, and Birmingham Yardley due to changes to ward boundaries in 2018).

== Constituency profile ==
The constituency is an inner suburban seat, on the fringes of the city centre to its north and bordering Solihull in the east and south. The number of non-whites (64.5%) is high compared to the rest of the city (42%), as is the proportion of social housing (25.7%), with both figures higher than the national average. The area is home to a high number of public parks, open space and numerous tree-lined streets.

A famous landmark is Sarehole Mill, where J.R.R. Tolkien spent his boyhood, and which provided the inspiration for The Hobbit and The Lord of the Rings.

Many constituents were employed in the car industry – notably Rover's nearby factories, which have now closed down.

== History ==
Summary of results

The 2015 result made the seat the 28th-safest of Labour's 232 seats by percentage of majority.

In the 2016 United Kingdom European Union membership referendum, the constituency voted to remain in the European Union with nearly two thirds of the vote, the strongest in Birmingham, despite the then MP Roger Godsiff's pro-Brexit stance. It was thus the most pro-EU constituency outside of Greater London to be represented by a pro-Brexit MP. Despite the Leave side winning the referendum, Godsiff did not vote to trigger Article 50 in the Parliament out of respect for his constituents' wishes.

The 2017 result made it the 12th-safest seat in the UK, with a majority of 62.5% of the vote.

Hall Green, on various boundaries, elected a Conservative MP throughout the period from 1950 to 1997, and formed, with Birmingham, Edgbaston, the last of the Birmingham seats during the 1979–1997 Conservative governments lost to Labour in 1997. This was the first time a Labour candidate had won the seat since it was created in 1950.

The 2015 result saw a 26.9% swing to the Labour Party and a correspondingly much greater-than-national-average swing away from the Liberal Democrat candidate. This was in part due to the collapse of Respect's vote.

Turnout

Turnout has ranged from 83.1% in 1950 to 57.5% in 2001.

== Members of Parliament ==
Birmingham Acock's Green and Birmingham Moseley prior to 1950

Election	Member	Party	Notes
1950	Aubrey Jones	Conservative	Minister of Fuel and Power (1957–1959); Resigned 1965
1965 by-election	Reginald Eyre	Conservative	Comptroller of the Household (1970–1972)
1987	Andrew Hargreaves	Conservative	
1997	Steve McCabe	Labour	Contested Birmingham Selly Oak following redistribution
Constituency split, majority joined Birmingham Selly Oak, minority merged with part of the abolished Birmingham Sparkbrook and Small Heath
2010	Roger Godsiff	Labour	Member for Birmingham Sparkbrook and Small Heath (1997–2010)
Nov 2019	Roger Godsiff	Independent	
Dec2019	Tahir Ali	Labour	Contested Birmingham Hall Green and Moseley following redistribution
2024	Constituency abolished		

== Election results 1950-2010 ==
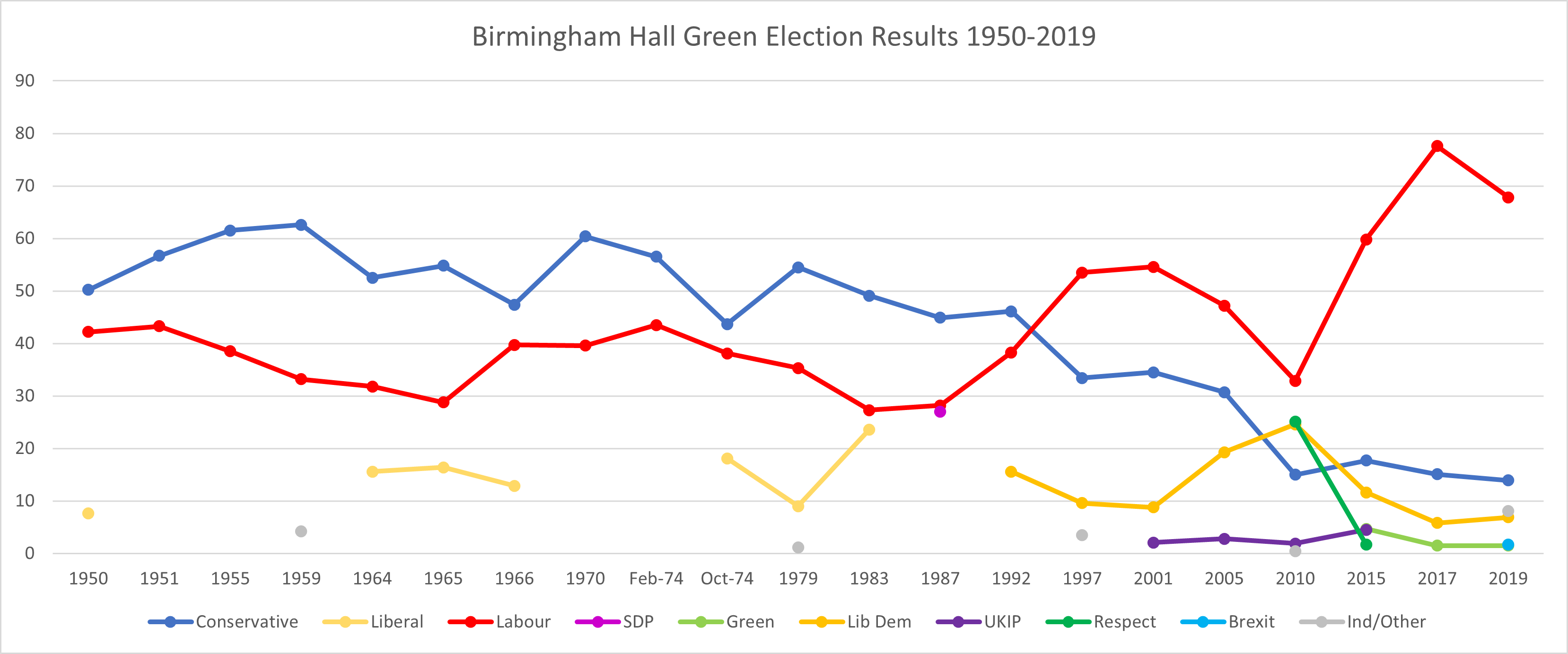

=== Elections in the 1950s ===
General election 1950: Birmingham, Hall Green
Party	Candidate	Votes	%
Conservative	Aubrey Jones	24,444	50.2
Labour	Thomas Crehan	20,591	42.2
Liberal	GL Roy	3,703	7.6
Majority		3,853	7.9
Turnout		48,738	83.1
Conservative win (new seat)			

General election 1951: Birmingham, Hall Green
Party	Candidate	Votes	%	±%
Conservative	Aubrey Jones	27,289	56.7	▲6.5
Labour	Thomas Crehan	20,874	43.3	▲1.1
Majority		6,415	13.4	▲2.0
Turnout		48,163	82.9	▼0.2
Conservative hold		Swing	▼2.7	

General election 1955: Birmingham, Hall Green
Party	Candidate	Votes	%	±%
Conservative	Aubrey Jones	28,543	61.5	▲4.8
Labour	William Pringle	17,846	38.5	▼4.8
Majority		10,697	23.1	▲9.7
Turnout		46,389	75.3	▼7.6
Conservative hold		Swing	▲4.8	

General election 1959: Birmingham, Hall Green
Party	Candidate	Votes	%	±%
Conservative	Aubrey Jones	29,148	62.6	▲1.1
Labour	Deryck HV Fereday	15,431	33.2	▼5.3
Ind. Conservative	Harry W Maynard	1,955	4.2	New
Majority		13,717	29.4	▲6.3
Turnout		46,534	76.2	▲0.9
Conservative hold		Swing	▲3.2	

=== Elections in the 1960s ===
General election 1964: Birmingham, Hall Green
Party	Candidate	Votes	%	±%
Conservative	Aubrey Jones	23,879	52.5	▼10.1
Labour	Graham S Rea	14,477	31.8	▼1.4
Liberal	Penelope Jessel	7,113	15.6	New
Majority		9,402	20.7	▼8.7
Turnout		45,469	75.8	▼0.4
Conservative hold		Swing	▼4.4	

By-election 1965: Birmingham Hall Green
Party	Candidate	Votes	%	±%
Conservative	Reginald Eyre	17,130	54.8	▲2.3
Labour	David Mumford	8,980	28.8	▼3.0
Liberal	Penelope Jessel	5,122	16.4	▲0.8
Majority		8,150	26.0	▲5.3
Turnout		31,232		
Conservative hold		Swing		

General election 1966: Birmingham, Hall Green
Party	Candidate	Votes	%	±%
Conservative	Reginald Eyre	20,628	47.4	▼5.1
Labour	George S Jonas	17,295	39.7	▲7.9
Liberal	John Green	5,617	12.9	▼2.7
Majority		3,333	7.7	▼13.0
Turnout		43,540	73.6	▼2.2
Conservative hold		Swing	▼6.5	

=== Elections in the 1970s ===
General election 1970: Birmingham, Hall Green
Party	Candidate	Votes	%	±%
Conservative	Reginald Eyre	27,319	60.4	▲13.0
Labour	T.L. Keene	17,930	39.6	▼0.1
Majority		9,389	20.8	▲13.1
Turnout		45,249	67.7	▼5.9
Conservative hold		Swing	▲6.6	

General election February 1974: Birmingham, Hall Green
Party	Candidate	Votes	%	±%
Conservative	Reginald Eyre	27,280	56.5	▼3.9
Labour	David Jamieson	21,036	43.5	▲3.9
Majority		6,244	13.0	▼7.8
Turnout		48,316	72.6	▲4.9
Conservative hold		Swing	▼3.9	

General election October 1974: Birmingham, Hall Green
Party	Candidate	Votes	%	±%
Conservative	Reginald Eyre	20,569	43.7	▼12.8
Labour	Theresa Stewart	17,945	38.1	▼5.4
Liberal	I. Powney	8,532	18.1	New
Majority		2,624	5.6	▼7.3
Turnout		47,046	70.2	▼2.4
Conservative hold		Swing	▼3.7	

General election 1979: Birmingham Hall Green
Party	Candidate	Votes	%	±%
Conservative	Reginald Eyre	27,072	54.5	▲10.8
Labour	Theresa Stewart	17,508	35.3	▼2.8
Liberal	P.M. Lockyer	4,440	9.0	▼9.1
National Front	R Maylin	615	1.2	New
Majority		9,564	19.2	▲13.6
Turnout		49,635	73.3	▲3.1
Conservative hold		Swing	▲6.8	

=== Elections in the 1980s ===
General election 1983: Birmingham Hall Green
Party	Candidate	Votes	%	±%
Conservative	Reginald Eyre	21,142	49.1	▼5.4
Labour	Martin Willis	11,769	27.3	▼8.0
Liberal	John Hemming	10,175	23.6	▲14.6
Majority		9,373	21.8	▲2.6
Turnout		43,086	70.6	▼2.7
Conservative hold		Swing	▲1.3	

General election 1987: Birmingham Hall Green
Party	Candidate	Votes	%	±%
Conservative	Andrew Hargreaves	20,478	44.9	▼4.2
Labour	Frances Brook	12,857	28.2	▲0.9
SDP	Francis Wilkes	12,323	27.0	▲3.4
Majority		7,621	16.7	▼8.9
Turnout		45,658	74.7	▲4.1
Conservative hold		Swing	▼2.6	

=== Elections in the 1990s ===
General election 1992: Birmingham Hall Green
Party	Candidate	Votes	%	±%
Conservative	Andrew Hargreaves	21,649	46.1	▲1.2
Labour	Jane Slowey	17,984	38.3	▲10.1
Liberal Democrats	David McGrath	7,342	15.6	▼11.4
Majority		3,665	7.8	▼8.9
Turnout		46,975	78.2	▲3.5
Conservative hold		Swing	▼4.4	

General election 1997: Birmingham Hall Green
Party	Candidate	Votes	%	±%
Labour	Steve McCabe	22,372	53.5	▲15.2
Conservative	Andrew Hargreaves	13,952	33.4	▼12.7
Liberal Democrats	Alastair Dow	4,034	9.6	▼6.0
Referendum	Paul Bennett	1,461	3.5	New
Majority		8,420	20.1	▲12.3
Turnout		41,819	71.2	▼7.0
Labour gain from Conservative		Swing	▲14.1	

=== Elections in the 2000s ===
General election 2001: Birmingham Hall Green
Party	Candidate	Votes	%	±%
Labour	Steve McCabe	18,049	54.6	▲1.1
Conservative	Chris White	11,401	34.5	▲1.1
Liberal Democrats	Punjab Singh	2,926	8.8	▼0.8
UKIP	Peter Johnson	708	2.1	New
Majority		6,648	20.1	Steady
Turnout		33,084	57.5	▼13.7
Labour hold		Swing	Steady	

General election 2005: Birmingham Hall Green
Party	Candidate	Votes	%	±%
Labour	Steve McCabe	16,304	47.2	▼7.4
Conservative	Eddie Hughes	10,590	30.7	▼3.8
Liberal Democrats	Roger Harmer	6,682	19.3	▲10.5
UKIP	David Melhuish	960	2.8	▲0.7
Majority		5,714	16.5	▼3.6
Turnout		34,536	60.4	▲2.9
Labour hold		Swing	▼1.8	

== Election results 2010-2024 ==
=== Elections in the 2010s ===
2005 notional result
Party	Vote	%
Labour	17,708	42.4
Liberal Democrats	11,059	26.5
Conservative	6,226	14.9
UKIP	1,223	2.9
Green	403	1.0
Others	5,190	12.4
Turnout	41,809	55.9
Electorate	74,741	

General election 2010: Birmingham Hall Green
Party	Candidate	Votes	%	±%
Labour	Roger Godsiff	16,039	32.9	▼9.4
Respect	Salma Yaqoob	12,240	25.1	New
Liberal Democrats	Jerry Evans	11,988	24.6	▼1.8
Conservative	Jo Barker	7,320	15.0	▲0.1
UKIP	Alan Blumenthal	950	1.9	▼1.0
Independent	Andrew Gardner	190	0.4	New
Majority		3,799	7.8	▼8.1
Turnout		48,727	63.6	▲7.7
Registered electors				
Labour hold		Swing		

General election 2015: Birmingham Hall Green
Party	Candidate	Votes	%	±%
Labour	Roger Godsiff	28,147	59.8	▲26.9
Conservative	James Bird	8,329	17.7	▲2.7
Liberal Democrats	Jerry Evans	5,459	11.6	▼13.0
Green	Elly Stanton	2,200	4.7	New
UKIP	Rashpal Mondair	2,131	4.5	▲2.6
Respect	Shiraz Peer	780	1.7	▼23.4
Majority		19,818	42.1	▲34.3
Turnout		47,046	61.6	▼2.0
Registered electors				
Labour hold		Swing		

General election 2017: Birmingham Hall Green
Party	Candidate	Votes	%	±%
Labour	Roger Godsiff	42,143	77.6	▲17.8
Conservative	Reena Ranger	8,199	15.1	▼2.6
Liberal Democrats	Jerry Evans	3,137	5.8	▼5.8
Green	Patrick Cox	831	1.5	▼3.2
Majority		33,944	62.5	▲20.4
Turnout		54,310	69.4	▲7.8
Registered electors				
Labour hold		Swing	▲10.2	

General election 2019: Birmingham Hall Green
Party	Candidate	Votes	%	±%
Labour	Tahir Ali	35,889	67.8	▼9.8
Conservative	Penny-Anne O'Donnell	7,381	13.9	▼1.2
Independent	Roger Godsiff	4,273	8.1	N/A
Liberal Democrats	Izzy Knowles	3,673	6.9	▲1.1
Brexit Party	Rosie Cuckston	877	1.7	New
Green	Patrick Cox	818	1.5	Steady
Majority		28,508	53.9	▼8.6
Turnout		52,911	65.9	▼3.5
Registered electors				
Labour hold		Swing	▼4.3	

== See also ==
- Parliamentary constituencies in the West Midlands (county)
