= Brandwood (ward) =

Coordinates: 52.414°N 1.896°W

- Ward
- Location within the West Midlands
- Population: 25,708 (2011 Ward)
  - Density: 41.9 per ha
- OS grid reference: SP070796
- Metropolitan borough: Birmingham
- Metropolitan county: West Midlands
- Region: West Midlands
- Country: England
- Sovereign state: United Kingdom
- Post town: BIRMINGHAM
- Postcode district: B14
- Dialling code: 0121
- Police: West Midlands
- Fire: West Midlands
- Ambulance: West Midlands
- UK Parliament: Birmingham Selly Oak

Brandwood was one of 40 wards which constituted Birmingham City Council and was part of the Birmingham Selly Oak constituency. Prior to May 2010, it was a part of the constituency of Birmingham Hall Green. Since 2018 the area has been part of the Brandwood and Kings Heath Ward. The area contains a large number of owner-occupied properties around Howard Road, Wheelers Lane, May Lane, Woodthorpe Road, Featherstone Road, Brandwood Road, Lindsworth Road and Alcester Road South, in addition to two big former council estates around Allenscroft Road and Druids Heath, the latter containing 16 high-rise tower blocks. Brandwood is a sub-section area of Kings Heath.

The area is served by Druids Heath Library, Cocks Moor Woods Leisure Centre and Golf Course, Baverstock School and Brandwood End Cemetery.

== Demography ==
The 2001 Population Census found that there were 23,306 people living in the ward with a population density of 4,167 people per km^{2} (41.9 people per hectare) compared with 3,649 people per km^{2} for Birmingham. There was a slightly higher proportion of females than males in the ward, with females representing 52.2% of the population, compared with 51.6% for Birmingham as a whole.

Brandwood is not an ethnically diverse community with ethnic minorities representing 12.6% (3,102) of the ward's population as opposed to 29.6% for Birmingham. 9.3% of the population was born outside of the United Kingdom, equal to that of the national percentage. The largest broad ethnic group was the White group at 87.4%. Whilst being above the city average of 70.4%, it was below the national average of 90.9%. The second largest broad ethnic group was Asian at 5.9%. More specifically, the White British group was the largest ethnic group at 81.6%. The White Irish group represented just 4.3%, although this was higher than the city average of 3.2% and the national average of 1.3%. The Black Caribbean ethnic group was the third largest at 2.9%. The most dominant religion in Brandwood was Christianity with 69.8% of residents stating themselves as Christians. 15.4% had no religion, above the city average of 12.4% and the national average of 14.6%. Islam was the second largest religion at 3.3%.

The age group representing the largest proportion of the ward's population was the 25–44 years at 27.7%. This is below the national average of 29.3% and the city average of 28.3%. People of a pensionable age represented 20.1% of the population, above the city average of 16.7%. 58.4% of the population was of a working age, below the city average of 59.8%. The ward had an unemployment rate of 8.1%, below the city rate of 9.5% but above the national rate of 5%. Of the unemployed, 40% were in long term unemployment, above the city average of 36.3%. 8.2% had never worked. 16.8% of those in employment worked in the Finance, Real Estate, & Business Activities sector. 16.2% worked in the Manufacturing sector. The largest employer based in the area is Cleaning Contractor Services Group Ltd, employing around 300 people. Moss Construction were the second largest, employing 285 people.

99.1% of the population lived in a household, above the city average of 98.3%. The other 0.9% lived in communal establishments. The total number of occupied households in the ward was 10,049, resulting in an average of 2.3 people per household. This is below the national average of 2.4 and the city average of 2.5. 62.4% of the households were owner occupied, above the city average of 60.4% and below the national average of 68.7%. 26% of households were rented from Birmingham City Council, above the city average of 19.4%. The majority of houses were semi-detached, with 42.2% of all properties being of that type. 25.1% of households were terraced houses, near to the national average of 25.8%. 21.1% were purpose built blocks of flats. 338 houses were identified as being empty.

== Politics ==
The ward was a Labour/Conservative marginal for its entire history. Local councillors have included: Steve McCabe (also the Member of Parliament for Hall Green Constituency until 2010), Roy Pinney, who served as Chair of and later Cabinet Member for Education, in addition to three female councillors, the last of these being Catherine Grundy, who lost her seat in 2004 and was subsequently elected to the Kingstanding ward in 2006.

Elections between 1984 and 2016 returned the following councillors:

- 1984: Len Gregory (Con) (defeated 1988)
- 1986: Bob Tyler (Con) (defeated 1990)
- 1987: John Lena (Con) (did not seek re-election 1991)
- 1988: Jane Slowey (Lab) (defeated 1992)
- 1990: Steve McCabe (Lab) (re-elected 1994)
- 1991: John Trojnacki (Con) (defeated 1995)
- 1992: Graeme Coombes (Con) (did not seek re-election 1996)
- 1994: Steve McCabe (Lab) (did not seek re-election 1998)
- 1995: Roy Pinney (Lab) (re-elected 1999)
- 1996: Fiona Williams (Lab) (defeated 2000)
- 1998: Catherine Grundy (Lab) (re-elected 2002)
- 1999: Roy Pinney (Lab) (defeated 2003)
- 2000: Mark Hill (Con) (re-elected 2004)
- 2002: Catherine Grundy (Lab) (defeated 2004)
- 2003: Neville Summerfield (Con) (re-elected 2004)
- 2004: Neville Summerfield (Con) (in office), Mark Hill (Con) (re-elected 2007), Ken Hardeman (Con) (re-elected 2006)
- 2006: Ken Hardeman (Con) (died 2007)
- 2007: Mark Hill (Con) (in office)
- 2007 Mike Leddy (Lab) (by-election Sept 2007 to boundary change)
- 2011 Dr Barry Henley (to boundary change)
- 2012 Eva Phillips (to boundary change)

== Transport ==
The main road through the area is the A435 Alcester Road. The Stratford-upon-Avon Canal also passes through the area. Map.
