= Dexter Pratt House =

Historic house in Massachusetts, United States

- U.S. National Register of Historic Places
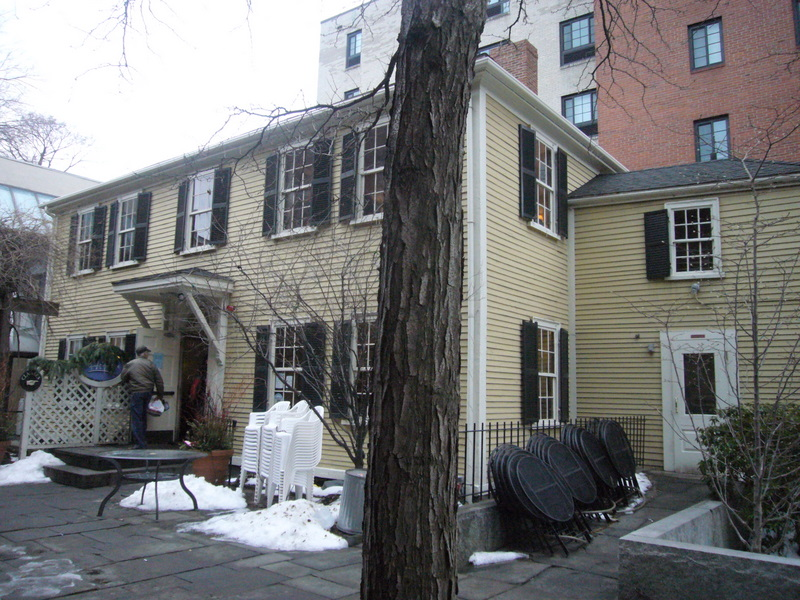

- Location within Massachusetts Location within the United States
- Location: 54 Brattle Street, Cambridge, Massachusetts
- Coordinates: 42°22′28.0″N 71°7′20.3″W
- Built: 1808
- Architectural style: Federal
- NRHP reference No.: 73000288
- Added to NRHP: May 8, 1973

The Dexter Pratt House is a historic house in Cambridge, Massachusetts. It is remembered as the home of Dexter Pratt, the blacksmith who inspired the poem "The Village Blacksmith" by Henry Wadsworth Longfellow.

== History ==
The house was built in 1808 and added to the National Register of Historic Places in 1973. It was built for blacksmith Torrey Hancock, who sold the home in 1827 to fellow blacksmith Dexter Pratt. Pratt worked there until his death in 1847; his widow lived there until her death in 1858. It was then passed on to the couple's married daughter Annie Louise Pratt Smith.

Dexter Pratt was the village blacksmith that inspired Henry Wadsworth Longfellow's poem "The Village Blacksmith". Longfellow published the poem in 1841 as part of Ballads and Other Poems, which also collected "The Wreck of the Hesperus". The poem proved to be popular. It mentioned a "spreading chestnut tree" where Dexter Pratt worked and, when a plan for Brattle Street to be widened was enacted in 1870, the tree was threatened. Initially, the road was built such that the tree was standing in the middle of the street. This set-up did not last long and when the tree was cut down, the children of Cambridge raised money to have the wood converted into an armchair and presented it to Longfellow in 1879, inspiring him to write a poem in gratitude titled "From my Arm-Chair".

After Pratt, the home was owned by Mary Walker and her family. Walker was born into slavery in North Carolina in 1818 and escaped to freedom in 1848. After the passing of the Fugitive Slave Act of 1850, she moved to Milton, Massachusetts before settling in the Pratt House in 1870, which was purchased from the daughter of Dexter Pratt. She lived here with her family for about 40 years. Annie Louise Pratt Smith had by then moved to Northampton, Massachusetts, with her husband George. The purchase of the $4,500 house on June 1, 1870, was subsidized by activist James Murray Howe, who deeded it to Mary Walker the next day.

In the 1930s, the Pratt House was remodeled into a fashionable tea house by local women in Cambridge who employed refugees who had escaped Nazi occupation in Europe. It eventually became a restaurant called the Cock Horse Inn. It was then purchased in 1947 by a group of women including Elsa Brändström Ulich as the new location of The Window Shop, which hired refugees and immigrants, and may have been the first business in Harvard Square to employ African American women. Ulich personally persuaded the group to choose the Pratt House as their location, though it was then in disrepair and its purchase necessitated raising $40,000 in loans.

== Modern use ==
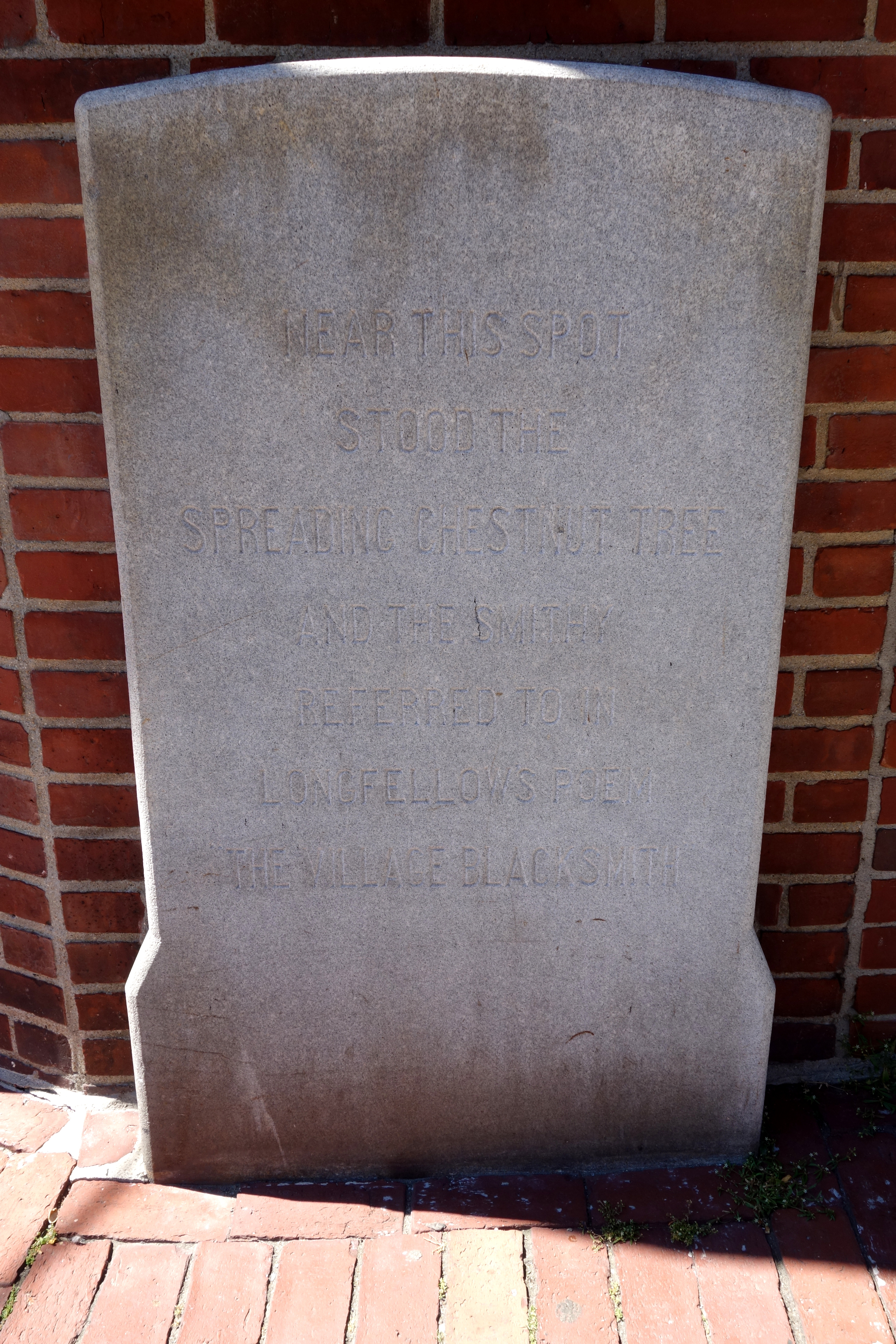
Stone marking the approximate location of the "spreading chestnut tree"

The building is now owned by the Cambridge Center for Adult Education which also owns the historic William Brattle House. The chestnut tree from the poem was commemorated in 1989 with a modern iron sculpture by Dimitri Gerakaris, whose anvil and other tools were incorporated into the metalwork. An engraved stone marks the spot where the tree once stood.

In 2014, the CCAE received a Preservation Award from the Massachusetts Historical Commission for its restoration efforts of the house.

== See also ==
- National Register of Historic Places listings in Cambridge, Massachusetts
