= Brändström =

Brändström may refer to:

- Charlotte Brändström (born 1959), Swedish-French film director
- Elsa Brändström (1888–1948), Swedish nurse and philanthropist
- (8831) Brändström, asteroid of the main asteroid belt see Meanings of minor planet names: 8001–9000#831
