= Rob Marris =

British Labour politician

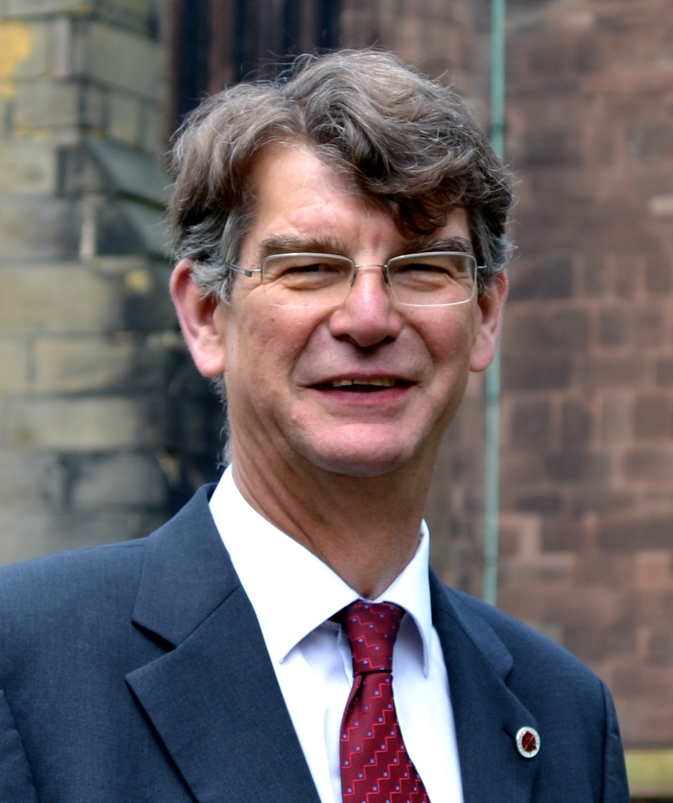
- Marris in 2014

Shadow Financial Secretary to the Treasury
- In office 18 September 2015 – 30 June 2016
- Leader: Jeremy Corbyn
- Preceded by: Alison McGovern
- Succeeded by: Peter Dowd

Member of Parliament for Wolverhampton South West
- In office 7 May 2015 – 3 May 2017
- Preceded by: Paul Uppal
- Succeeded by: Eleanor Smith
- In office 7 June 2001 – 12 April 2010
- Preceded by: Jenny Jones
- Succeeded by: Paul Uppal

Personal details
- Born: Robert Howard Marris; 8 April 1955 (age 71) Wolverhampton, England
- Party: Labour
- Other political affiliations: New Democratic (Canada)
- Education: University of British Columbia
- Profession: Solicitor

Robert Howard Marris (born 8 April 1955) is a British Labour Party politician, who served as the Member of Parliament (MP) for Wolverhampton South West. He first held the seat from 2001 until his defeat in 2010. He regained at the seat at the 2015 general election, but stepped down at the 2017 general election.

== Early life and career ==
The son of Dr. Charles Marris and Margaret Marris JP, he was born in Wolverhampton and partially educated at Warstones Primary School, before attending Birchfield Preparatory School and St. Edward's School in Oxford.

He then moved to Canada and spent some time as a lumberjack, before obtaining a double first in History and Sociology from the University of British Columbia. He then completed a master's degree, working as a truck driver whilst finishing his thesis.

Having decided he wanted a career in law in the UK and not being eligible for a UK grant, he spent 3 years driving trolleybuses, followed by a period as a forest fire fighter during which time he joined Greenpeace, newly founded in Vancouver, becoming world member no. 204. He was also a member of the New Democratic Party, Canada's counterpart to the Labour Party as members of the Socialist International.

He served his articles of clerkship in Wolverhampton and went to work for Thompsons Solicitors, the trade union law firm, until he was elected to the House of Commons.

== Parliamentary career ==
=== 2001–10 ===
First elected at the 2001 general election, on 8 July 2007, he became Parliamentary Private Secretary to Shaun Woodward, the Secretary of State for Northern Ireland.

In July 2008, Marris received the "Backbencher of the Year" award from The House, the magazine of the House of Commons. Marris spoke in a "well above average" number of parliamentary debates and had a "well above average" voting record.

Marris emerged well from the May 2009 political scandal of MPs expenses disclosures being listed as a "saint", with minimal claims for second home. However, he was defeated in the 2010 general election by Paul Uppal of the Conservative Party.

=== 2015–17 ===
In May 2013, Marris was once again selected as the Labour Party's Parliamentary candidate for Wolverhampton South West in the 2015 General Election. The seat was once held by the Conservative Enoch Powell, known for his April 1968 "rivers of blood" speech in which he opposed immigration. In the run-up to the 2015 election, both Marris, his main opponent, Paul Uppal and even UKIP agreed that immigration was no longer a key issue. Marris expressed concern about zero hour contracts, foodbanks and workers earnings below living wages and whilst Uppal highlighted the improvement in community relations.

In 2015, Marris introduced the Assisted Dying Bill, based on Lord Falconer of Thoroton's earlier proposals in the House of Lords. The bill was praised by Philip Collins, a leader writer for The Times as "a sophisticated and humane attempt" to clarify the law before the courts do so and which unlike religion "will actually ease suffering." Archbishop Welby's subsequent objections were described as "histrionic" and lacking any religious reason. According to Linda Woodhead, professor of sociology of religion at Lancaster University, 70 per cent of religious people wanted the law changed. The bill was rejected by 330 to 118.

A marginal at the 2015 general election, Marris regained Wolverhampton South West with a majority of 801 votes. He was appointed Shadow Financial Secretary to the Treasury by Jeremy Corbyn in September 2015.

On 30 June 2016, Marris resigned during the committee stage hearings on the Finance Bill and reportedly called on Corbyn to resign along with a number of Parliamentary colleagues preceding the 2016 leadership election. During the 2020 Labour Party leadership election, a video emerged of candidate Rebecca Long-Bailey, who at the time of the ultimately unsuccessful 2016 leadership challenge had been in post as Shadow Chief Secretary to the Treasury for 3 days, accusing Marris of having his assistant delete shared Shadow Cabinet files after resigning in an attempt to undermine loyalist frontbenchers. Marris strongly denied there was any malicious intent and said that his assistant deleted the files because the document was created by his Parliamentary office and was not the property of the Labour Party. In an interview Marris clarified that it was him who removed the shared files, not his assistant.

Marris stood down at the 2017 general election, which Labour was expected to lose badly. His successor, Eleanor Smith, held the seat for Labour with an increased majority of 2,185.

== Personal life ==
In June 2008, Marris was cautioned after causing damage, which he said was unintentional, to a van which was impeding his access to a bus stop. He is Honorary President of the Wolves on Wheels Cycle Campaign.

After leaving Parliament, Marris was appointed Board Director for B E Wedge Holdings Ltd, the holding company for Wedge Group Galvanizing.

Parliament of the United Kingdom
Preceded by Jenny Jones	Member of Parliament for Wolverhampton South West; 2001–2010	Succeeded by Paul Uppal
Preceded by Paul Uppal	Member of Parliament for Wolverhampton South West; 2015–2017	Succeeded by Eleanor Smith
