= Freedom Church =

Coordinates: 52.0587°N 2.7095°W

- Freedom Church logo
- Freedom Church
- Country: Worldwide
- Denomination: Evangelical Non-denominational Charismatic
- Website: www.freedomchurch.cc

History
- Former name: New Life Church
- Founded: May 1988
- Founder(s): Gary Snowzell, Heather Snowzell

Freedom Church is a global non-denominational evangelical Christian church whose vision is to "Connect Anyone Anywhere to a Life Changing relationship with Jesus". The church is headquartered in Hereford in the United Kingdom with locations in Africa, Asia, Europe, North America, South America. Freedom Church is a member of the Evangelical Alliance.

== History ==
Freedom Church was founded as New Life Church by Pastors Gary and Heather Snowzell in 1988. Originally situated in Leominster in Herefordshire. It moved to Hereford around 2005 and was renamed Freedom Church.

In 2011, Freedom Church partnered with the Southern Baptist megachurch NewSpring Church in South Carolina. The purpose of the partnership was to help Freedom Church plant churches all over the world. This arrangement came to an end in December 2017. In 2015, Freedom Church started to give 10% of its income as a tithe to NewSpring Church, though this has since ceased.

Freedom Church's first church plant was in Cardiff in 2011, and it has since started established in Africa, North America, South America, Asia and Europe.

In 2015, Freedom Church's Hereford location moved into and renovated a former cinema and nightclub in the centre of Hereford.

During the COVID-19 pandemic, Freedom Church in Worcester, England supported a local food bank by providing storage space.

== Music ==
Freedom Church has produced Five albums, Three singles and an EP.

Albums and EPs

- Upstream (Live) (2026)
- Barbarians (2023)
- Thunder. Reign. (2018)
- Uncharted (2015)
- Everything Changes (Live) (2012)
- Courage & Fire - EP (2009)

Singles

- Holy - Single (2025)
- Running The Race (Live At The Cave) - Single (2018)
- This is Love - Single (2014)

== Media ==
Freedom Church has a YouTube channel, and its messages have been shown on the TV channels broadcast on the television channels TBN UK and TBN Africa.

== Freedom Heroes ==
Freedom Church in Kampala, Uganda ran an organisation called 'Freedom Heroes' which took homeless boys aged 12–21 off the streets of Kampala, Uganda and supported them with housing, a "Street School", and "Street Church" with the stated aim of reuniting them with their families. Sponsors from the United States can visit their beneficiaries on a missions trip with NewSpring Church.

Freedom Heroes is a registered charity in both Uganda and the United Kingdom.

== Notable people ==
Stuart Anderson, who sat on Herefordshire Council as councillor for Kings Acre ward and was later elected as the Member of Parliament for Wolverhampton South West in the 2019 general election, was a member of the church along with his wife, and has appeared on Songs of Praise to promote the church. Anderson has since moved to represent the Conservatives in South Shropshire. He has held that seat since July 2024.

Freedom Church has maintained a friendship with NewSpring Church's founder Perry Noble, who delivered a sermon for Freedom Church after finishing rehab and before starting Second Chance Church.

== Controversies ==
In 2011, the Hereford Times reported allegations concerning Freedom Church, including claims relating to arranged marriages, "fight clubs" and mass baptisms. The newspaper also reported concerns about advice given to young members regarding relationships, as well as questions about links between the church's youth group, 2XL, and Herefordshire Council, including reported council funding for youth services delivered in local schools. Freedom Church strongly disputed the claims, saying "We have never encouraged 14-year-old girls to 'consider marrying older men'", "Nor have we ever implied that if a girl were to be baptised 'it will lead to a relationship with someone in the church'", and "We do not brainwash people [...] if Freedom Church is not the place for [new people], they are quite free to leave" if the Church was not for them.

In 2012, police were called when Freedom Church teenagers and volunteers distributed leaflets with attached sweets to children outside Whitecross Hereford High School to promote the church's youth club

In 2013, a Freedom Church volunteer involved with its newly opened Siem Reap church attracted criticism after posting comments about Cambodia and the church's activities there. The comments prompted discussion about the church's evangelistic activities in Cambodia, where restrictions applied to some forms of religious activity, and about its work among disadvantaged communities.

=== Swansea University ===
In 2014, the Swansea University student newspaper reported that the church was banned from campus by the university. The article quoted Kevin Childs, former Director of Student Services, saying: "Concerns have been raised by various organisations and individuals in Wales and elsewhere about the operational methods used by the Freedom Church to recruit members by targeting vulnerable members of society and their cultic style of operation". Freedom Church responded saying it was "baffled by the Swansea University ban, claiming that the institution had 'never spoken to us about anything.'"

The University itself denied the report, saying: "We have not officially banned this organisation from holding services and events on campus. Permission is not granted to any faith group unless they are a society registered with the student’s union. The Freedom Church is not registered with the student’s union. This is what we meant by the term affiliated." A University Spokesperson further clarified: "Only affiliated faith organisations are permitted to hold services on the campus. Members of the Freedom Church were not removed from campus but the 250 posters which appeared just before the Freshers arrived were taken down. Only approved posters are permitted on campus."

The Evangelical Alliance strongly denied that the Freedom Church is a cult, saying that it has worked alongside the organisation for over 20 years. The national director for Evangelical Alliance Wales Reverend Elfed Godding said, "We are fully supportive of what they do. They're an orthodox Christian church; they have a good track record of social engagement, of caring for needy people. I'm not quite sure what the issue of complaint was about."

A former member told Wales Online that they had joined the church during a vulnerable period in their life and subsequently felt that the church had affected their family relationships. When they were invited to attend a £1,000 year-long course in Hereford, they declined but described it as a 'red flag'. It was also claimed that members "never" had relationships outside of the church.

The church responded by saying that they were “great believers in the importance and strength of the family even when families sometimes have a different perspective” and was "more transparent than just about any church".

== Locations ==
Freedom Church has churches across the world, with locations in the following cities:

Europe

- Limassol, Cyprus
- Rotterdam, Netherlands
- Hereford, England, United Kingdom
- Herefordshire, England, United Kingdom (named: Christ Church Herefordshire)
- Bristol, England, United Kingdom (named: Courageous Church Bristol)
- Cardiff, Wales, United Kingdom
- Worcester, England,
- Birmingham, England, United Kingdom
- Cheltenham, England, United Kingdom

Africa

- Nairobi, Kenya
- Kigali, Rwanda
- Musanze, Rwanda
- Cape Town, South Africa
- Kampala, Uganda

Asia

- Battambang, Cambodia
- Phnom Penh, Cambodia
- Siem Reap, Cambodia
- Bengaluru, India
- Chennai, India
- Chiang Mai, Thailand

Americas

- Pindamonhangaba, Brazil
- Charleston, South Carolina, United States (named: Courageous Church Charleston)
- Raleigh, North Carolina, United States
