= Paul Uppal =

British politician (born 1967)

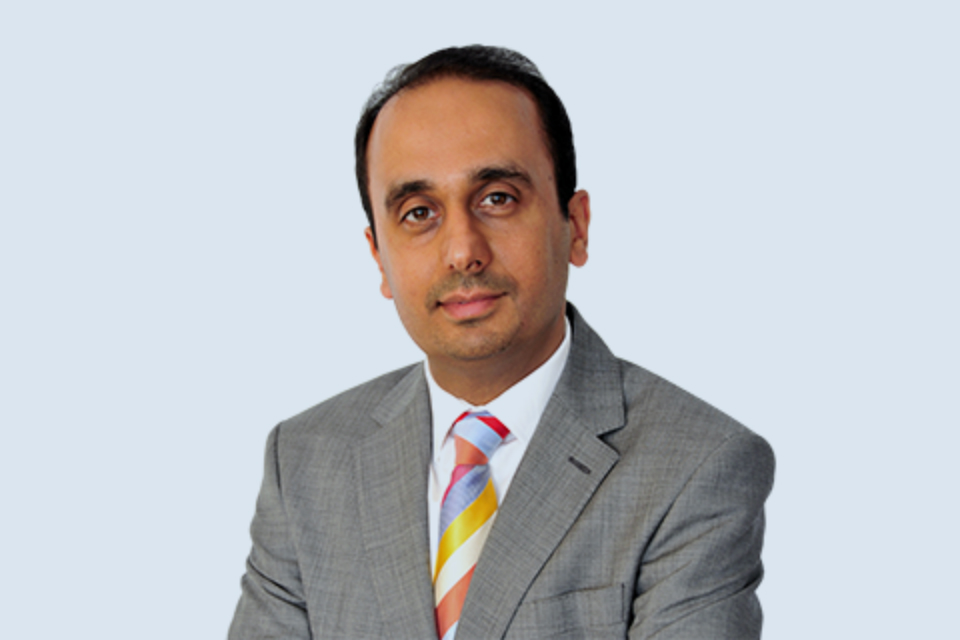

Member of Parliament for Wolverhampton South West
- In office 6 May 2010 – 30 March 2015
- Preceded by: Rob Marris
- Succeeded by: Rob Marris

Personal details
- Born: Paul Singh Uppal; 14 June 1967 (age 59) Birmingham, England
- Party: Conservative
- Spouse: Kashmir Matto
- Children: 3
- Education: University of Warwick
- Website: pauluppal.co.uk

Paul Singh Uppal (born 14 June 1967) is a Conservative Party politician from the United Kingdom. He was the Member of Parliament for Wolverhampton South West from the 2010 general election to 2015. Uppal attempted to win the seat back at the 2017 general election

On 20 December 2017, the government announced that he was to be the first Small Business Commissioner.

== Early life ==
Uppal was born in Birmingham, to Surjit Singh Uppal, a magistrate, and Balbir Kaur on 14 June 1967. His parents are Indian Sikhs from East Africa. He attended Harborne Hill Comprehensive School and then studied three A-levels in Politics, History and Sociology at Matthew Boulton College. He studied Politics and Sociology at the University of Warwick.

He married his wife Kashmir, a lawyer, on 17 November 1991 in Derby. They have three children together. He holds a season ticket for Wolverhampton Wanderers Football Club, and is a trustee of the second largest Gurudwara (Sikh Temple) in Wolverhampton.

== Political career ==
Uppal was selected as Conservative Party candidate for Birmingham Yardley less than three months before the 2005 general election. The seat was traditionally a Conservative-Labour Party marginal, but became a three-way marginal at the 1992 general election and a Labour-Liberal Democrat marginal since the 1997 general election, with the Conservatives pushed into an increasingly distant third place. Uppal came third in 2005, winning 2,970 votes, with Liberal Democrat John Hemming replacing the retiring Labour MP Estelle Morris.

In February 2007, Uppal was selected as the Wolverhampton South West Conservative candidate in an open primary held at Molineux Stadium, in which all constituents were entitled to vote. The seat had once been a safe Conservative seat, held first by Enoch Powell from 1950 to 1974 and then by Nicholas Budgen, but became a Labour marginal, held by Jenny Jones in 1997. Rob Marris held it from 2001 onwards, though the Labour majorities gradually reduced at each election, Uppal won the seat from the incumbent Labour MP Rob Marris with 16,344 votes and a majority of 691.

In July 2010, he was elected Chairman of the All Party Urban Development Group. In October 2011, he voted against a referendum on the UK's membership of European Union. In September 2012, he was appointed PPS to David Willetts at the Department for Business, Innovation and Skills.

In the run up to the 2015 general election, both Uppal, his main opponent Marris, and even UKIP agreed that immigration was no longer a key issue in the seat which was once held by the controversial MP Enoch Powell. Uppal highlighted the improvement in community relations whilst Marris expressed concern about zero-hour contracts, foodbanks and workers earning less than a living wage.

Uppal was narrowly defeated at the 2015 general election, when Marris regained the seat with a majority of 801. Uppal stood as a candidate in the same seat at the 2017 snap general election and despite increasing his party's vote share by 3%, the Labour vote increased by 6.1%, and Uppal consequently lost by 2,185 votes.

Parliament of the United Kingdom
Preceded by Rob Marris	Member of Parliament for Wolverhampton South West; 2010–2015	Succeeded by Rob Marris
