= Flag of the Black Country =

Flag of English region

Black Country
- Proportion: 3:5
- Adopted: 14 July 2012
- Design: Per pall reversed Sable, Gules and Argent a pall reversed Argent over all an inverted chevron of chain counterchanged Argent, Sable, Argent
- Designed by: Gracie Sheppard

The Black Country flag is the flag of the Black Country region of England. It was registered with the Flag Institute as a regional flag in 2012.

== History ==
The design was the winner of a competition run by the Black Country Living Museum in response to a campaign by the Parliamentary Flags & Heraldry Committee encouraging communities and regions to develop their own flags to celebrate the Diamond Jubilee of Elizabeth II and the 2012 Summer Olympics.

2012 competition finalists

Design A - Gracie Sheppard. (Winner)

Design B - Aimee Potter. The gold background symbolises the metal industries that the Black Country was famous for. The prominent chain imagery also evokes the region's industry, with the middle link forged into a strong cross to represent the strength and determination of the people. A crossed chain also appears on the attributed arms of Saint Leonard (albeit with inverted colours), the patron saint of locksmiths and blacksmiths.

Design C - Marnie Bond. The central black lozenge represents a lump of coal, the surrounding red rectangle stands for iron ore, and the white lozenge symbolises limestone. The black background represents the industrial smoke from which the Black Country got its name.

Design D - Samuel Bhella. The blue represents the sky as well as the region's canals, while the yellow symbolises sandstone and the sun. The fire evokes the furnaces that burned in the Black Country's many factories, and the chain link stands for the chainmaking industry.

Design E - Rizwan Jamil. The flame pattern combined with the colours of black and red evoke the era when the Black Country was described as being "black by day (due to the smoke in the sky) and red by night" (due to the glow of the furnace fires).

Design F - Michelle Inston. The black stripe represents a seam of coal and the various industries established in the region because of it. The two green stripes symbolise the present and future state of the Black Country, with its areas of open countryside, urban countryside and parks.

After 1,500 votes were cast by members of the public, a design by 11-year old Gracie Sheppard of Redhill School, Stourbridge was announced as the winning entry at the museum's Festival of Steam, celebrating 300 years of the Newcomen atmospheric engine.

The flag was flown at Eland House, the headquarters of the Department for Communities and Local Government on 14 July 2013 to celebrate 'Black Country Day' and also Britain's role in leading the Industrial Revolution.

== Design ==
The flag features a chain to represent the manufacturing heritage of the area whilst the upright triangular shape (heraldic gusset or graft) in the background recalls the iconic glass cones and iron furnaces that featured in the architectural landscape of the area. The red and black colours recall the famous description of the Black Country by Elihu Burritt that it was "black by day and red by night" owing to the smoke and fires of industry.

The Pantone colours for the flag are:

- Black
- White
- Red 186 C

== Flying the flag ==
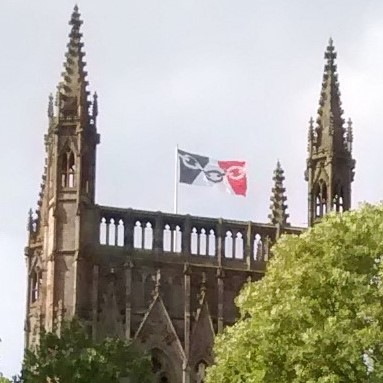
Worcester Cathedral flying the Black Country Flag.

The flag is one of very few regional, non-historic county flags that may be flown without consent of a local planning authority, providing the flag is "maintained in a condition that does not impair the overall visual appearance of the site" and does not block official signs (such as road signs).

== Controversy ==
In July 2015, Wolverhampton-born historian and anti-racism campaigner Patrick Vernon OBE called for the design of the flag to be replaced, saying that "the Black Country factories and foundries made chains, shackles and manacles during slavery that were used in colonial Africa to enslave black people. The same factories employed people from the Caribbean and Asia during the 1950s and 60s on lower wages and poorer working conditions compared to their white counterparts. And of course the chain industry oppressed the white working classes too, so I feel the use of the chain logo is inappropriate in today's world where we know the effects of this history". Vernon later said that the reaction to his comments on the Express & Star website and harassment on his Twitter account reflected "a degree of scepticism and criticism of 'political correctness gone mad' in suggesting that the Black Country ever had some involvement in the slave trade. Again this highlights that we have not matured or reflected as a nation on our colonial past which has an impact both on black and white people".

Shortly after her election to the House of Commons, Wolverhampton South West Member of Parliament Eleanor Smith was reported to have criticised the design of the flag because of the association of locally made chains with the slave trade and to have suggested that the design of the flag be changed. On Twitter, she denied calling the flag racist or calling for it to be banned, and in her Commons maiden speech, said that her comments "had been taken out of proportion", and that she had received "many abusive messages" over the issue. The controversy was the subject of a question in Prime Minister's Questions, in which Theresa May defended the flag, saying "The Black Country remains a great place to do business, and I'd like to congratulate Gracie on designing that flag at the age of only 12 years. And I have to say that I am sure that she and others, including the Express & Star, have been surprised at the attitude from the benches opposite on this particular issue". In 2018, a man from Castlecroft, an area within Smith's constituency, was given a nine-week suspended prison sentence for sending racist and threatening emails to several MPs, including Smith, in which he told her to be put on "the first banana boat" to "the jungle clearing you came from". Both the prosecution and defence cited Smith's reported comments about the flag as having motivated the abusive emails.

Writing in The Guardian in July 2017, activist Matthew Stallard, a former University of Manchester student, claimed that it was "a historical fact that the Black Country was a key provider of metalworked goods to the slave trade and plantation economies of the Americas and throughout the British Empire. Scholars have consistently demonstrated the inherently interlinked nature of industrial development in all areas of the UK and imperial expansion, whether directly by trading British goods for people, using slave-produced raw materials, or the sale and use of British-made goods in slave or colonial economies". He added, "An effort to create a truly inclusive local identity requires a less defensive stance than the one demonstrated by the local press in recent days – one that is at the very least open to listening to and trying to understand the experiences and historical viewpoints of others".

In July 2020, against the backdrop of the George Floyd protests, West Midlands Fire Service pre-emptively denied permission to local fire stations to fly the Black Country flag on Black Country Day "until we have a clear understanding of the meaning of the chains [on the flag]" due to the potential link to slavery. The decision was criticised by Wolverhampton South West MP Stuart Anderson, Dudley South MP Mike Wood, and Dudley North MP Marco Longhi, who called on West Midlands Fire Service to apologise. The fire service later reversed its position.
