= Eleanor Smith (politician) =

Former Labour MP

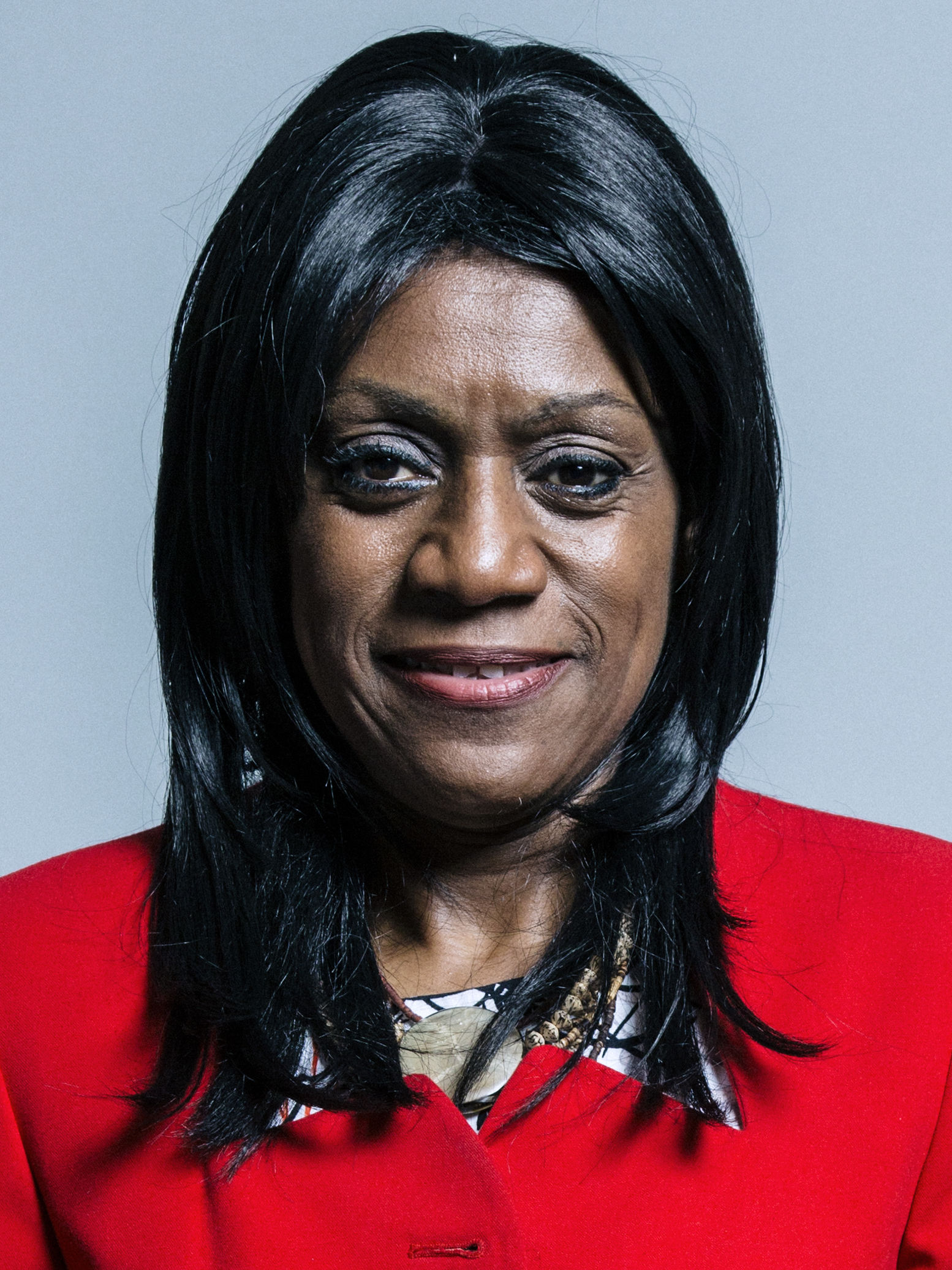
- Official portrait, 2017

Member of Parliament for Wolverhampton South West
- In office 8 June 2017 – 6 November 2019
- Preceded by: Rob Marris
- Succeeded by: Stuart Anderson

President of Unison
- In office 24 June 2011 – 22 June 2012
- General Secretary: Dave Prentis
- Vice President: Chris Tansley; Maureen Le Marinel
- Preceded by: Angela Lynes
- Succeeded by: Chris Tansley

Vice President of Unison
- In office 8 July 2009 – 24 June 2011 Serving with Angela Lynes and Chris Tansley
- General Secretary: Dave Prentis
- President: Gerry Gallagher; Angela Lynes
- Preceded by: Gerry Gallagher
- Succeeded by: Maureen Le Marinel

Personal details
- Born: Eleanor Patricia Smith; 5 July 1957 (age 68) Birmingham, England
- Party: Labour

Eleanor Patricia Smith (born 5 July 1957) is a British Labour politician and trade unionist who served as the Member of Parliament (MP) for Wolverhampton South West from 2017 to 2019. She served as the President of the trade union Unison from 2011 to 2012, and the Vice President from 2009 to 2011.

== Early career ==
Smith started training to be a nurse in 1977, and worked as theatre nurse from 1984 to 2017 at Birmingham Women's NHS Foundation Trust.

Smith was elected to serve as the first black woman President, from 2011 to 2012, and Vice President, from 2009 to 2011, of the trade union Unison. She later became the regional council chair of Trades Union Congress Midlands.

== Parliamentary career ==
Smith was elected as the MP for Wolverhampton South West at the 2017 general election, succeeding outgoing Labour MP Rob Marris with an increased majority. She credited her victory to backing from Unison and Momentum activists rather than her Constituency Labour Party, who she said made her feel like "cannon fodder".

Smith was the first British African-Caribbean person to represent a constituency in the West Midlands in the House of Commons, in a seat that was held for more than two decades by Enoch Powell (but had also been held by Paul Uppal, a British Indian).

Smith was a member of the Public Administration and Constitutional Affairs Committee. She was also the Co-chair of two All-Party Parliamentary Groups (APPGs): one on obesity, and the other on adult social care.

Smith commissioned an outside agency to produce a review into BAME blood, organ and stem cell donation. The review suggested some actions for the Government to take to increase the number of BAME donations. This led to the then Parliamentary Under-Secretary (Department of Health and Social Care) Jackie Doyle-Price agreeing to meet Smith.

At the 2019 election, Smith lost her seat to the Conservative Party candidate, Stuart Anderson.

=== Voting record ===
Smith never rebelled against her party whip on any vote in Parliament. While her constituency voted to leave the European Union, she generally voted for more EU integration, and consistently voted against reducing central government funding of local government.

=== Black Country flag controversy ===
The flag of the Black Country

Shortly after her election to the House of Commons, Smith was reported to have criticised the design of the flag of the Black Country because of the association of locally made chains with the slave trade, and to have suggested that the design of the flag be changed. On Twitter, she denied calling the flag racist or calling for it to be banned, and in her Commons maiden speech, said that her comments "had been taken out of proportion", and that she had received "many abusive messages" over the issue. The flag had previously been described as "offensive and insensitive" in 2015 by Wolverhampton-born, London-based activist Patrick Vernon, who claimed that its chains were a "disturbing" image of an industry that profited from the transatlantic slave trade and colonial rule in Africa.

In 2018, a UK Independence Party supporter from Castlecroft (an area in Smith's constituency) was given a nine-week suspended prison sentence for sending racist and threatening emails to several MPs, including Smith, in which he told her to be put on "the first banana boat" to "the jungle clearing you came from". Both the prosecution and defence cited Smith's reported comments about the flag as having motivated the abusive emails.

== Post-parliamentary life ==
During the COVID-19 pandemic, Smith participated in a round-table event involving church leaders in Birmingham in response to comments the previous week saying uptake of the vaccine in some of the city's most vulnerable communities was as low as 50%. She said as a Christian, she would like to see strong interventions from church leaders, "When people are being misinformed on such a grand scale, churches need to step up. I am a Christian myself and I think they need to be clear. In my view they need to tell people it's OK to be vaccinated or it's a bit of a cop out". She also praised efforts in other faith communities, adding, "Many imams seem to be doing a good job in trying to get these messages out, we need to see the same".

Smith said official efforts to dispel myths and reassure people needed to be stepped-up, "Historically black people have not always been listened to, or treated equally in terms of medical care, so there is a lack of trust sometimes. We need to deal with it and we need role models within the community".

== Personal life ==
Smith's parents arrived in Great Britain from Barbados in 1954 as part of the Windrush generation. Smith is a Christian.

Parliament of the United Kingdom
Preceded by Rob Marris	Member of Parliament for Wolverhampton South West; 2017–2019	Succeeded by Stuart Anderson
