= Orange chips =

Deep fried potato dish

Orange chips are a variety of chips consisting of large slices of potato dipped in an orange batter and deep-fried. The batter colour may be achieved with turmeric or paprika. They are seen as a regional specialty of the English Midlands, particularly the Black Country. In July 2025 a mural by an unknown artist of former England football manager Sam Allardyce eating orange chips was painted on a wall in Dudley. In July 2026, another mural was pasted on a wall of a fish-and-chip shop in Quinton, Birmingham depicting England football team players Jude Bellingham and Morgan Rogers eating orange chips. The Quinton mural was created using Photoshop and added the footballers' birthplaces (Stourbridge for Bellingham and Halesowen for Rogers) to images of them with the addition of the Black Country flag.
