= Harborne Academy =

Location
- Harborne Road; Harborne; Birmingham, West Midlands, B15 3JL; England
- Coordinates: 52.4619°N 1.9382°W

Information
- Type: Academy
- Motto: Aspire Believe Achieve
- Local authority: Birmingham City Council
- Department for Education URN: 136213 Tables
- Ofsted: Reports
- Head teacher: Sarah Ross
- Gender: Mixed
- Age: 11 to 16
- Enrolment: 595 as of January 2023
- Capacity: 600
- Houses: Boulton, Cadbury, Ryland & Zephaniah
- Website: www.harborneacademy.co.uk

Harborne Academy (formerly Harborne Hill School) is a co-educational secondary school in the Harborne area of Birmingham, in the West Midlands of England.

Previously a community school administered by Birmingham City Council, Harborne Hill School converted to academy status in September 2010 and was renamed Harborne Academy. However the school continues to coordinate with Birmingham City Council for admissions. The school is now sponsored by Birmingham Metropolitan College, but continues to coordinate with Birmingham City Council for admissions. The school also has specialisms in science and health.

Harborne Academy offers GCSEs and BTECs as programmes of study for pupils.

== History ==
The school opened in 1952 as Harborne Hill School; the first headteacher was Miss D Hill. In 2010, due to economic issues, the school became an academy. There was some difficulty finding a sponsor for it after Ark Schools pulled out, but it was eventually sponsored by Birmingham Metropolitan College.

== Refurbishment ==
In around mid 2012, work began to demolish the old building which stood since the school opened, and BAM Construction began work on constructing a new building. The old Library front was preserved however, and still stands today in the Atrium. In 2013, the building was finished, and Samsung Digital Academy was chosen to provide many of the IT resources at the time.

== Sixth form ==
The school previously had a sixth form. This was re-opened in 2014. Inspection in 2016 found that "Teaching in the sixth form is better than in the rest of the school". In 2017 Ofsted reported that "The sixth form is a medical academy and specialises in helping students to gain the qualifications and skills needed to go on to a range of medical professions". As of 2023, the school no longer has a sixth form.

== Inspections by Ofsted ==
- 2010, as Harborne Hill School, Satisfactory
- 2013, Requires Improvement
- 2014, Requires Improvement
- 2016, Inadequate
- 2017, Good
- 2022, Good. As of 2023, this is the school's most recent inspection.

== Notable former pupils ==
- Paul Uppal, Conservative Party politician
