= Window Shop =

Shop in Cambridge, Massachusetts, US

- Formation: 1939; 87 years ago
- Founder: Elsa Brändström Ulich
- Founded at: 37 Church Street, Cambridge, Massachusetts, US
- Dissolved: 1972; 54 years ago
- Type: Consignment Shop and Restaurant
- Headquarters: 56 Brattle Street, Cambridge, Massachusetts, US

The Window Shop (1939–1972) was a store located in Cambridge, Massachusetts, created by a small group of women wanting to help immigrants fleeing Europe. It was originally located in a room on the second floor of 37 Church Street and was named for the room's large window. One of these women was Elsa Brändström Ulich, a Swedish-immigrant nurse and philanthropist.

== Background ==
In 1939, four women opened the Window Shop at 37 Church Street with a combined sum of 65 dollars to aid immigrants fleeing German-occupied Europe who needed jobs, housing, and English education. At first, the Shop served as a consignment shop where immigrant women could sell their handicrafts and homemade baked goods, but after moving to 102 Mt. Auburn Street in November 1939, it was able to open a tea room and pastry shop, and within a year, was serving lunch. It would also eventually contain a dress and gift shop.

Shop revenue was used to pay employees, who were mostly immigrants or refugees. During the 1940s, the Shop became one of the first businesses in Cambridge to hire African-Americans. The Window Shop created jobs for and trained hundreds of people in various skills, such as salesclerks, dressmakers, bakers, etc. Employee schedules were based on their own needs and availability, and not at the whim of the Shop. The Shop was also concerned with working conditions, wages, and providing benefits not required by law, which made it a progressive employer for the time. The Window Shop also was funded in part by, and cooperated with, the New England Christian Committee for Refugees (NECCR).

In addition to providing a space for immigrants to work and make money, The Window Shop also provided scholarships to children of employees and emergency assistance funds.

In January 1942, Frances Fremont-Smith (wife of Frank Fremont-Smith), opened a Friendship House, where immigrants and refugees could attend lectures, sing, check out books from a lending library, and get information about other events around town one day a week, while enjoying refreshments. However, due to lack of funding, the Friendship House closed after a year of operation.

Due to lack of space, The Window Shop relocated, for the last time, to 56 Brattle Street in 1947. The new building, constructed in 1811 for Torrey Hancock, had previously been the Cock Horse Inn, Dexter Pratt's Blacksmith Shop (made famous by the Henry Wadsworth Longfellow poem "The Village Blacksmith"), and after The Window Shop sold it in 1972, it was the Hi-Rise Bakery and then the Cambridge Center for Adult Education.

The Window Shop restaurant would, at times, serve around 8,000 customers a day, but by the late 1960s, patron usage declined, and despite rebranding the Shop restaurant with a new manager and a Viennese Cafe, The Window Shop had to sell out and close in 1972. After closure, The Window Shop changed its name to The Window Shop, Inc. Scholarship Fund, which was incorporated in 1942, and it continued to offer scholarships to "new Americans" until 1987.

In 1987, The Window Shop Inc., Scholarship Fund dissolved, with board members deciding that it outlived its usefulness and deeming that other Cambridge institutions could carry out their work. After dissolution, the Fund left its name and some assets to Northeastern University to give to refugee students. Other funds were given to former employees, some were designated for the processing of their archival materials at the Schlesinger Library, and some for a future history written on The Window Shop. The majority of the assets, however, went to The Boston Foundation to assist with refugees and foreign-born residents.

== Sources/external links ==
- Kaufmann, Dorothy (2006). "A Haven for "New Americans": The Window Shop in Cambridge, Massachusetts, 1939-1949". Massachusetts Historical Review. 8: 16–33. ISSN 1526-3894.
- Kleespies, Gavin W.; MacDonald, Katie. "The Window Shop". Harvard Square.
- Miller, Ellen (2007). The Window Shop: Safe Harbor for Refugees. iUniverse. ISBN 9780595849871.
