= Elihu Burritt =

American diplomat (1810–1879)

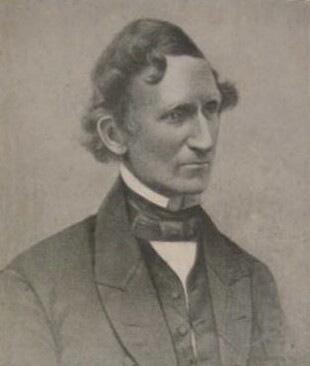
- Born: December 8, 1810; New Britain, Connecticut, U.S.
- Died: March 6, 1879 (aged 68); New Britain, Connecticut, U.S.
- Occupations: Diplomat; philanthropist
- Notable work: Walks in the Black Country and its Green Border-Land

United States Consul to Birmingham, England
- In office 1864–1868
- President: Abraham Lincoln

Elihu Burritt (December 8, 1810 – March 6, 1879) was an American philanthropist, social activist, and blacksmith. He was also a prolific lecturer, journalist and writer who traveled widely in the United States and Europe.

== Early life ==
Elihu Burritt was born December 8, 1810, in New Britain, Connecticut. He first worked as a blacksmith. As an adult he was active as a lecturer in many causes, opposing slavery, working for temperance, and trying to achieve world peace.

In the early 1840s Burritt began to tour New England, speaking against war and promoting brotherhood. His sobriquet "Learned Blacksmith" arose from a period when he earned a living as a blacksmith in Worcester, Massachusetts. He founded a weekly paper, the Christian Citizen, in Worcester in 1844.

By this time, Burritt had emerged at the head of a group of radical pacifists within the American Peace Society, and took on George Cone Beckwith, who supported a gradualist attitude on multiple fronts. There was a confrontation in 1845. Burritt was given the chance to take over as editor of The Advocate of Peace, the organ of the American Peace Society, but Beckwith employed delaying tactics. When Burritt came into post at the beginning of 1846, he renamed the publication as The Advocate of Peace and Universal Brotherhood. But when Beckwith had mustered enough support, in May, the decision was reversed. The infighting cost the society its president, Samuel Elliott Coues, who resigned.

== Move to England ==
In the summer of 1846, the disillusioned Burritt left the cautious Beckwith, and went to England. He stayed initially with Joseph Sturge. Setting off in July on a walking tour, he went to Worcester, the namesake town, to speak. He travelled widely around a new home in Harborne, then a rural village, largely on foot. He was sympathetic to the industrial and political culture of Birmingham, and became a friend of many of its leading citizens, so that what he wrote about it was largely positive. During his time in Birmingham he lived in a house which he named New Britain Villas. Burritt was actively involved in the local community, taking part in the committee for the rebuilding of St. Peter's Church, Harborne.

During a trip abroad in 1846–47, Burritt was touched by the suffering of the Irish peasantry.

== League of Universal Brotherhood ==
Burritt founded the peace organization, the League of Universal Brotherhood in 1846. He launched it at Pershore, and it was supported by Sturge, James Silk Buckingham, and John Jefferson of the London Peace Society. The Quaker Edmund Fry (1811–1866) became its secretary, and Charles Gilpin a supporter. Burritt edited the monthly Bond of Brotherhood, from London. The league promoted the use of free-labour produce. Female auxiliaries, called 'Olive Leaf Circles', raised funds for the league by selling articles made from free-labour cotton and other raw materials. By 1850 there were around 150 of such circles in Britain.

"The peace movement", as an umbrella term that included supporters of William Lloyd Garrison and the "moral force" Chartists, as well as the league and Peace Society radicals, was popularized by Burritt from 1847.

Burritt organized the first international congress of the Friends of Peace, which convened in Brussels in September 1848. The league was shortly an international movement, but its British branch became part of the London Peace Society in 1857. It influenced the later work in the United Kingdom of Priscilla Peckover.

A second International Peace Congress met in Paris in 1849, presided over by Victor Hugo. Burritt attended the "Peace Congresses" at Frankfurt in 1850, London in 1851, Manchester in 1852 and Edinburgh in 1853. The outbreak of the Crimean War and then the American Civil War jolted his views.

== Later life ==
Burritt's first stay in Britain ended in 1853. He returned to New England, taking an interest in farming and agricultural methods.

Burritt advocated that Britain, which introduced the Uniform Penny Post in 1840, should introduce an international "ocean penny post" and reduce the cost from one shilling (12 pence) to threepence. He argued this would increase international correspondence, trade, and hence universal brotherhood. He urged the use of illustrated propaganda envelopes. Postal rates were gradually reduced, but his objective was not entirely achieved in his lifetime.

In 1856–1857 Burritt spent much time on abolitionist lecturing in the USA. He was promoting his version of compensated emancipation.

Burritt was appointed United States consul in Birmingham, England by Abraham Lincoln in 1864. When Ulysses S. Grant was elected in 1868, he was not reappointed to the post. He died on March 6, 1879, in New Britain, Connecticut.

== Selected publications ==
Burritt published at least 37 books and articles. They included:

- Sparks from the Anvil
- Ten Minute Talks.
- A Journal of a Visit of Three Days to Skibbereen (1847). It made residents of the United States more aware of the Great Famine of Ireland.
- Walks in the Black Country and its Green Border-Land. Recorded his thoughts on the industrialization of communities in Birmingham and the Black Country, and brought the latter term into widespread common usage. It was the third of the travel books he wrote about Britain for American readers. He was the author of the famous early description of the Black Country as "black by day and red by night", adding appreciatively that it "cannot be matched, for vast and varied production, by any other space of equal radius on the surface of the globe".
- A Walk from London to John O'Groat's, with notes by the way (1864) and A walk from London to Land's End and back, with notes by the way (1865): These two books are thought to have influenced John and Robert Naylor who undertook the first recorded walk from Land's End to John o' Groats in 1874 and published their book on it in 1916

== Legacy ==
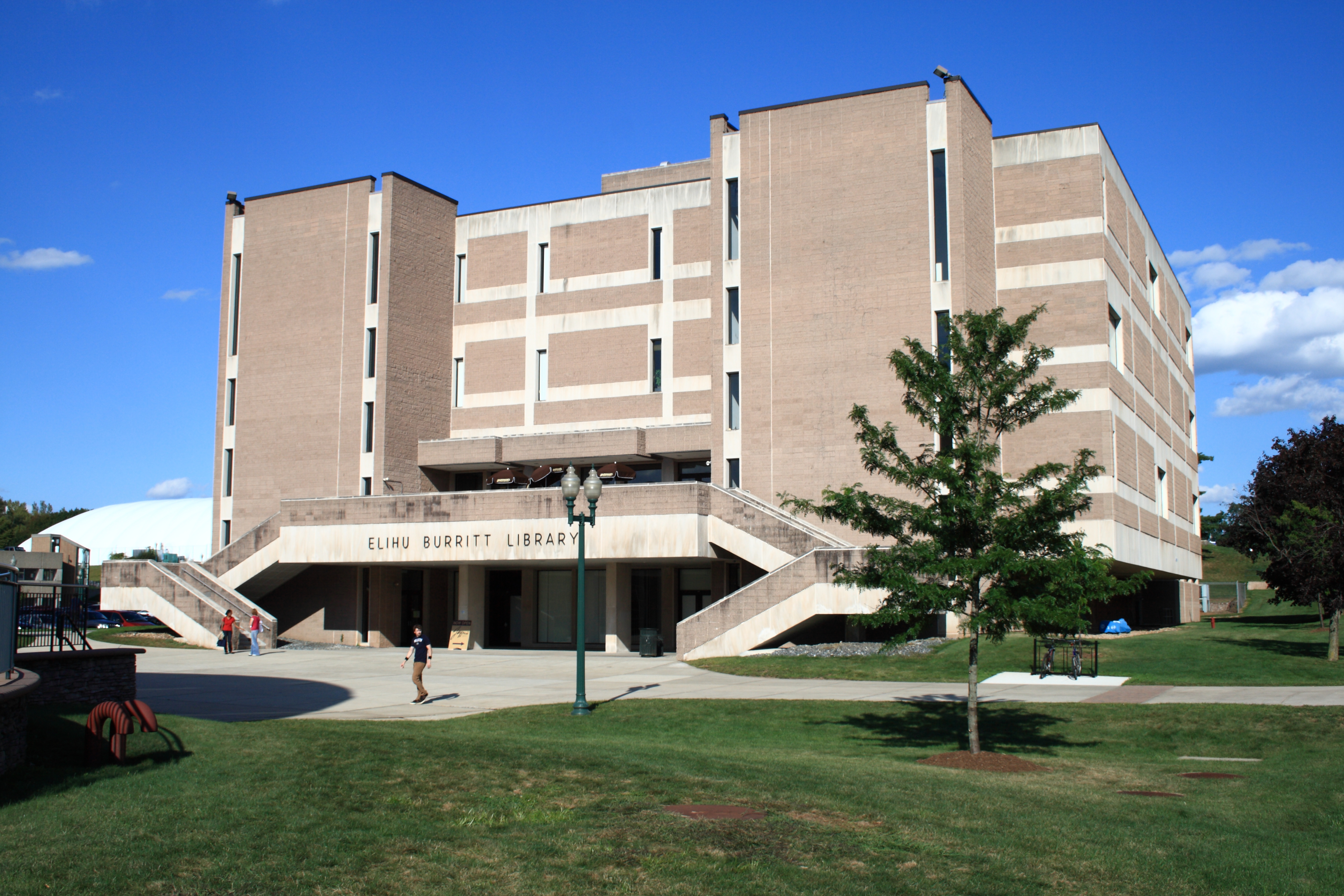
Elihu Burritt Library, Central Connecticut State University

Each August, New Marlborough, Massachusetts, hosts an annual crafts and community fair in honor of Elihu Burritt. Burritt resided in the Berkshire County Town in 1830. He is one of several blacksmiths who may have inspired the poem "The Village Blacksmith" by Henry Wadsworth Longfellow.

Burritt College, which operated in Spencer, Tennessee, from 1848 to 1939, was named in his honor.

The library at the Central Connecticut State University in New Britain, Connecticut is named in his honor – The Elihu Burritt Library. It holds an archive of his work and correspondence. Another archive is held as part of the Swarthmore College Peace Collection.

== See also ==
- List of peace activists
- Black Country flag the colors of which inspired by his description of the Black Country
