= Wedge Group =

British multinational galvanising company

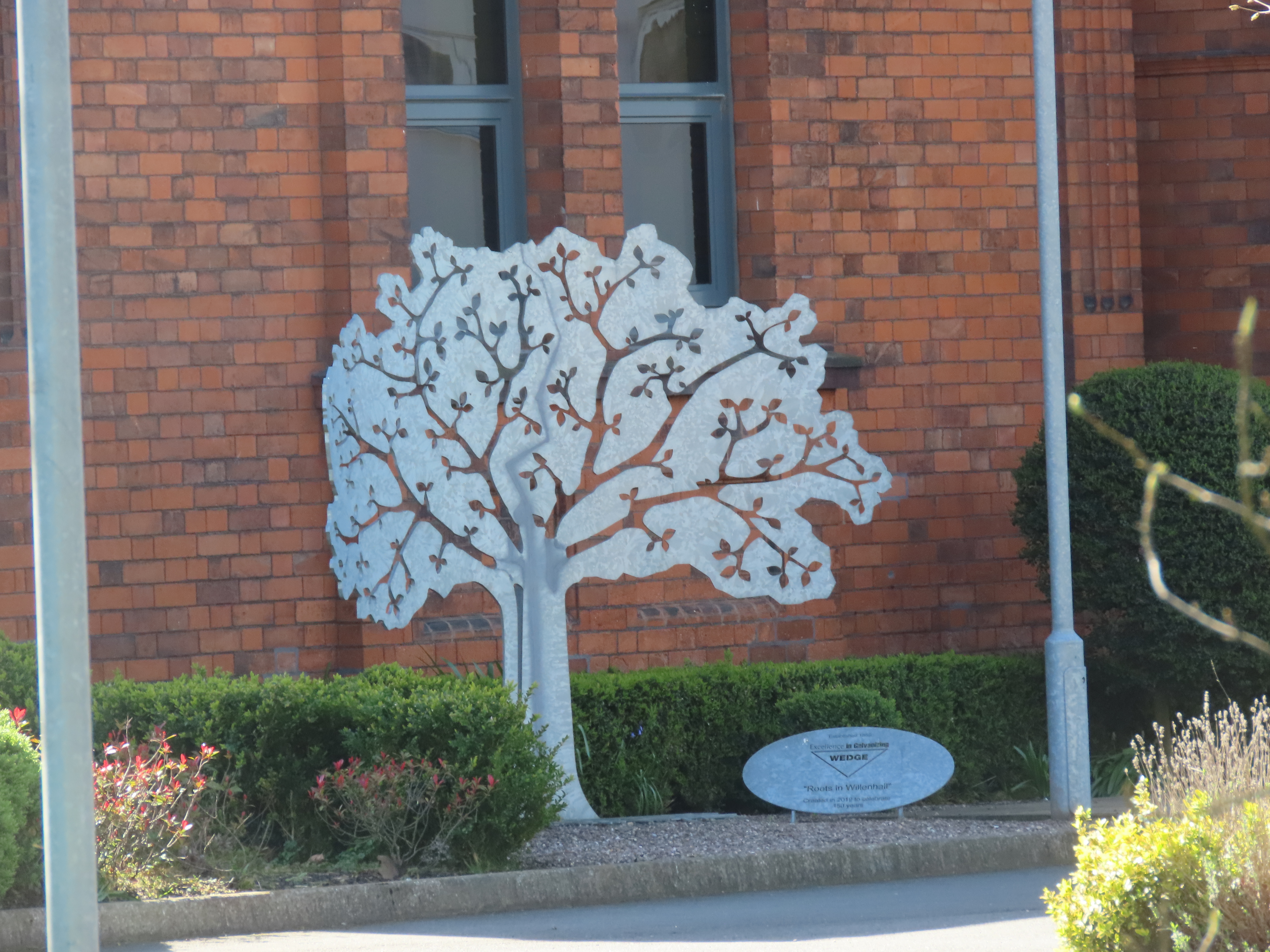
- Sculpture created for the company's 150th anniversary, Willenhall
- Type: Private
- Industry: Galvanising
- Founder: Enoch Wedge
- Headquarters: Willenhall, United Kingdom
- Number of employees: 1050 (2009)
- Website: www.wedge-galv.co.uk

Wedge Group is a British multinational galvanising company which operates several facilities within the United Kingdom. As of 2009 it was the largest galvanising company in the UK, and had wholly owned operations in the United States and Italy. It is headquartered in Willenhall. The company was founded in the 1850s by Enoch Wedge.
