= Jenny Jones (Labour politician) =

British politician

Member of Parliament for Wolverhampton South West
- In office 1 May 1997 – 14 May 2001
- Preceded by: Nicholas Budgen
- Succeeded by: Rob Marris

Personal details
- Born: Jennifer Grace Bew; 8 February 1948 (age 78)
- Party: Labour
- Education: University of Wolverhampton

Jennifer Grace Jones (née Bew; born 8 February 1948) is a Labour Party politician in the United Kingdom.

Jones was selected as a Labour candidate through an all-women shortlist. She was elected as member of parliament in the 1997 general election for the Wolverhampton South West constituency, defeating the Conservative incumbent Nicholas Budgen with a majority of 5,118. However, fairly early on in Labour's first term in government, she announced that she would not be seeking re-election at the 2001 election. She was succeeded by Rob Marris.

Prior to entering Parliament, she worked as a social worker and had served on Wolverhampton Metropolitan Borough Council from 1991 to 1997. In 2002 she was made an honorary fellow of the University of Wolverhampton.

Parliament of the United Kingdom
Preceded by Nicholas Budgen	Member of Parliament for Wolverhampton South West; 1997–2001	Succeeded by Rob Marris
