= The Village Blacksmith =

Poem

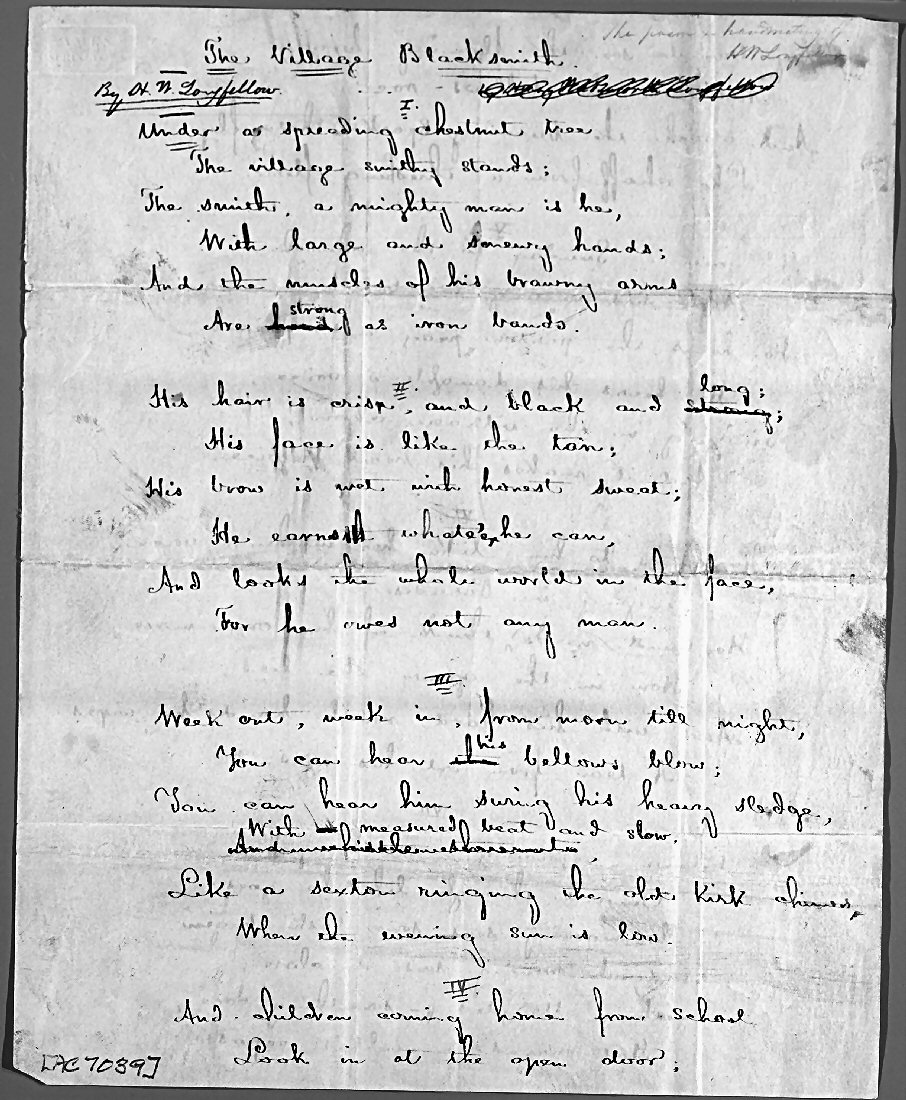
First page of the original manuscript for "The Village Blacksmith"

"The Village Blacksmith" is a poem by Henry Wadsworth Longfellow, first published in 1840. The poem describes a local blacksmith and his daily life. The blacksmith serves as a role model who balances his job with the role he plays with his family and community. Years after its publication, a tree mentioned in the poem was cut down and part of it was made into an armchair which was then presented to Longfellow by local schoolchildren.

== Synopsis ==
The poem is about a local blacksmith. Noted as being strong, he works by the sweat of his brow and does not owe anyone anything. Children coming home from school stop to stare at him as he works, impressed by the roaring bellows and burning sparks. On Sundays, the blacksmith, a single father after the death of his wife, takes his children to church, where his daughter sings in the village choir. He goes through his life following the daily tasks assigned to him and has earned his sleep at night. The narrator concludes by thanking the blacksmith for the lessons he can teach.

== Origins ==
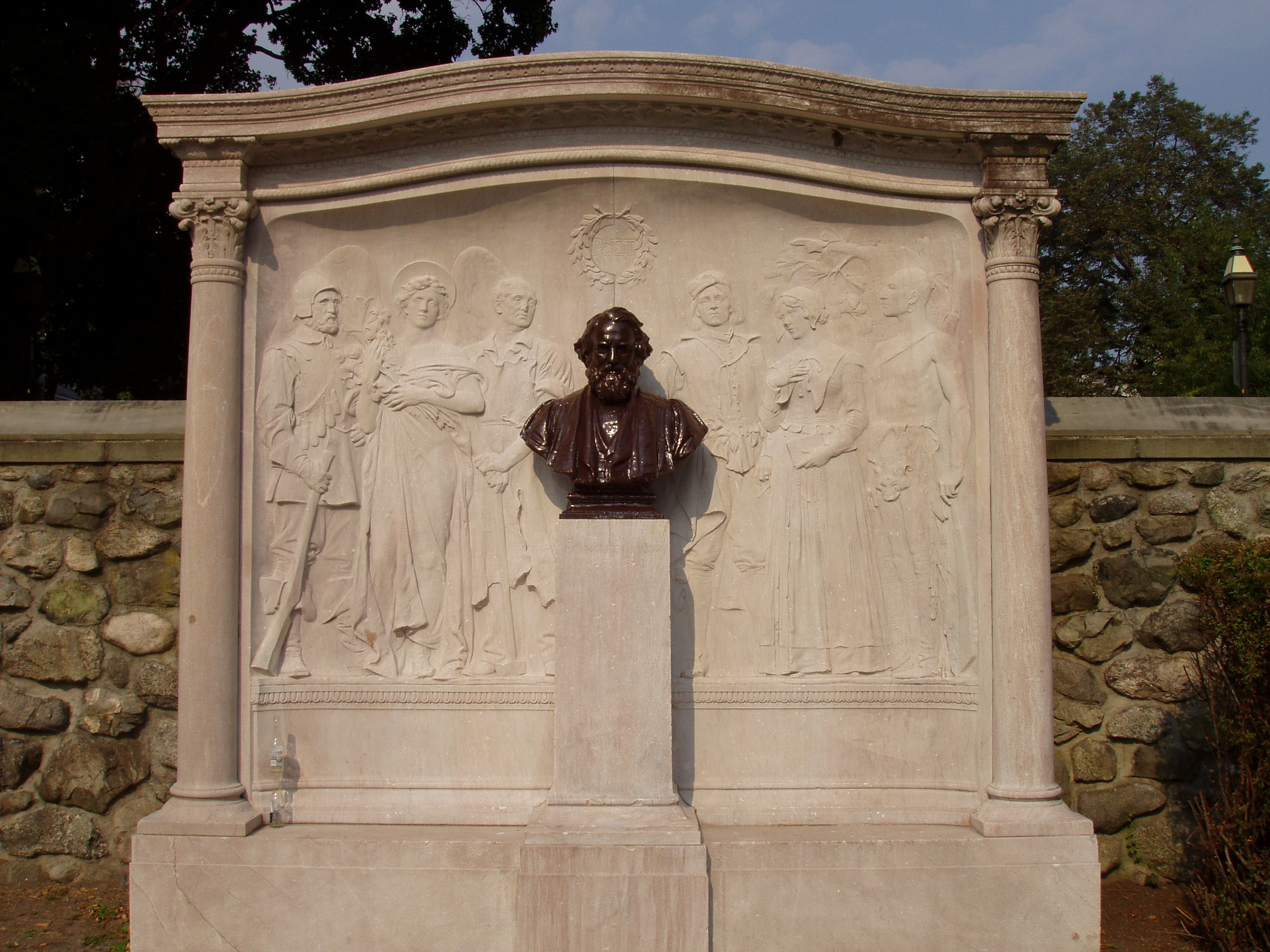
The title character of "The Village Blacksmith", third from the left, depicted in the Longfellow Memorial by Daniel Chester French and Henry Bacon, Cambridge, Massachusetts

Longfellow said the poem was a tribute to his ancestor Stephen Longfellow, who had been a blacksmith, a schoolmaster, then a town clerk. In 1745, this ancestor was the first Longfellow to make his way to Portland, Maine, the town where the poet would be born. The poem was written early in Longfellow's poetic career, around the same time he published his first collection, Voices of the Night, in 1839. The book included his poem "A Psalm of Life". On October 5, 1839, he recorded in his journal: "Wrote a new Psalm of Life. It is 'The Village Blacksmith.'" It would be another year before the poem was published, however. Longfellow wrote to his father on October 25, 1840: "There will be a kind of Ballad on a Blacksmith in the next Knickerbocker, which you may consider, if you please, as a song in praise of your ancestors at Newbury."

The actual village blacksmith in the poem, however, was a Cambridge resident named Dexter Pratt, a neighbor of Longfellow's. Pratt's house is still standing at 54 Brattle Street in Cambridge. Several other blacksmiths have been posited as inspirations for the character in the poem, including "The Learned Blacksmith" Elihu Burritt, to whom Longfellow once offered a scholarship to attend Harvard College.

Several people, both in the United States and in England, took credit for inspiring the poem with varying amounts of evidence. The Longfellow family became annoyed with the preponderance of claims. In 1922, the poet's son Ernest Wadsworth Longfellow responded to these people in his book Random Memories. In a section called "Quips and Cranks", he wrote:

A short time ago I saw in an English newspaper that the “village smithy” was in a certain English village that was named; as a matter of fact, as everybody knows, it was on Brattle Street, Cambridge, Massachusetts.

== Publication and response ==
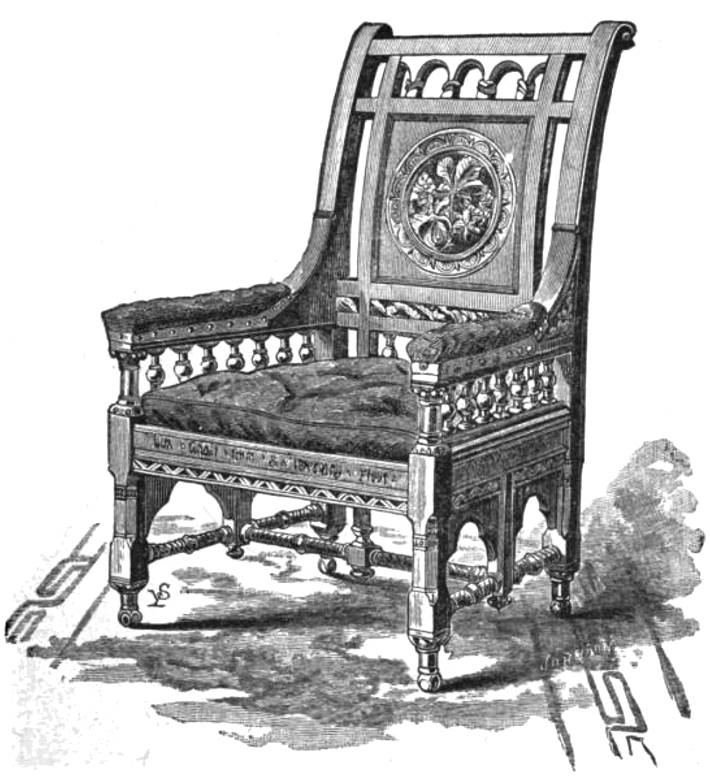
Chair made from the chestnut tree in the poem, presented to Longfellow in 1879

"The Village Blacksmith" was first published in the November 1840 issue of The Knickerbocker. It was soon after printed as part of Longfellow's poetry collection Ballads and Other Poems in 1841. The collection, which also included "The Wreck of the Hesperus", was instantly popular. Scholar Karen L. Kilcup suggests that the poem's popularity, like Longfellow's later poem "Paul Revere's Ride", reflects contemporary Americans' need for heroic national figures.

In 1879, years after the publication of "The Village Blacksmith", the local schoolchildren in Cambridge, Massachusetts presented Longfellow with an armchair made from "the spreading chestnut tree" in the poem which had recently been cut down. Under the cushion of the chair is a brass plate on which is inscribed, in part: "This chair made from the wood of the spreading chestnut-tree is presented as an expression of his grateful regard and veneration by the children of Cambridge". From then on, Longfellow made it a rule to allow schoolchildren to be admitted into his study to see the chair. He also composed a poem to commemorate his gift called "From my Arm-Chair". The site on Brattle Street in Cambridge where the tree once stood is now designated with a stone marker.

== Analysis ==
"The Village Blacksmith" is written in six line stanzas alternating between iambic tetrameter and trimeter with a regularity of cadence and rhyme that mimics the stability invoked in the poem's narrative. The title character of the poem is presented as an "everyman" and a role model: he balances his commitments to work, the community, and his family. The character is presented as an iconic tradesman who is embedded in the history of the town and its defining institutions because he is a longtime resident with deeply rooted strength, as symbolized by the "spreading chestnut tree". Longfellow uses the poem to glorify and celebrate a humble, plain person, much as John Greenleaf Whittier does in his poem "The Barefoot Boy". Further, Simon Bronner notes that, like Nathaniel Hawthorne's woodcarver character in "Drowne's Wooden Image", Longfellow is praising the craftsman in a time of industrialization.

== Adaptations and influences ==
The poem, along with several others by Longfellow, was translated into Spanish by Colombian poet Rafael Pombo. In several interviews, baseball player and manager Billy Southworth noted that his father recited the poem to him as a child, that he himself memorized it, and that it inspired him as an adult.

Several quotes from the poem were used in Buster Keaton's 1922 silent comedy The Blacksmith (1922).

In 1926, a comical song called "The Village Blacksmith Owns the Village Now" was published with words by Leslie Moore and music by Johnny Tucker. The lyrics detailed how the blacksmith grew rich with the rise of the automobile by converting his shop into a service station. The song was recorded by popular U.S. comedians and bandleaders of the era including the Happiness Boys and Harry Reser.

In 1938, songwriters Tommie Connor, Jimmy Kennedy, and Hamilton Kennedy created a comical song and dance routine inspired by the poem; Glenn Miller's recording of the song was featured in the 1990 film Memphis Belle.

Danny Kaye recites a portion of the poem in the 1945 movie Wonder Man.

Daffy Duck recites a portion of the poem in the 1953 cartoon Duck Amuck.

The first bandmaster of the Royal Army Ordnance Corps, R. T. Stevens, suggested the adoption of the song version of "The Village Blacksmith" as the Corps' march of the RAOC in 1922. He argued that the melody had a marching lilt, the theme was appropriate, and that many regimental marches were based on airs. Accordingly "The Village Blacksmith" became the RAOC Regimental March. The Royal New Zealand Army Ordnance Corps adopted the same march.
