= Stuart Anderson (politician) =

British politician (born 1976)

Stuart Anderson MP
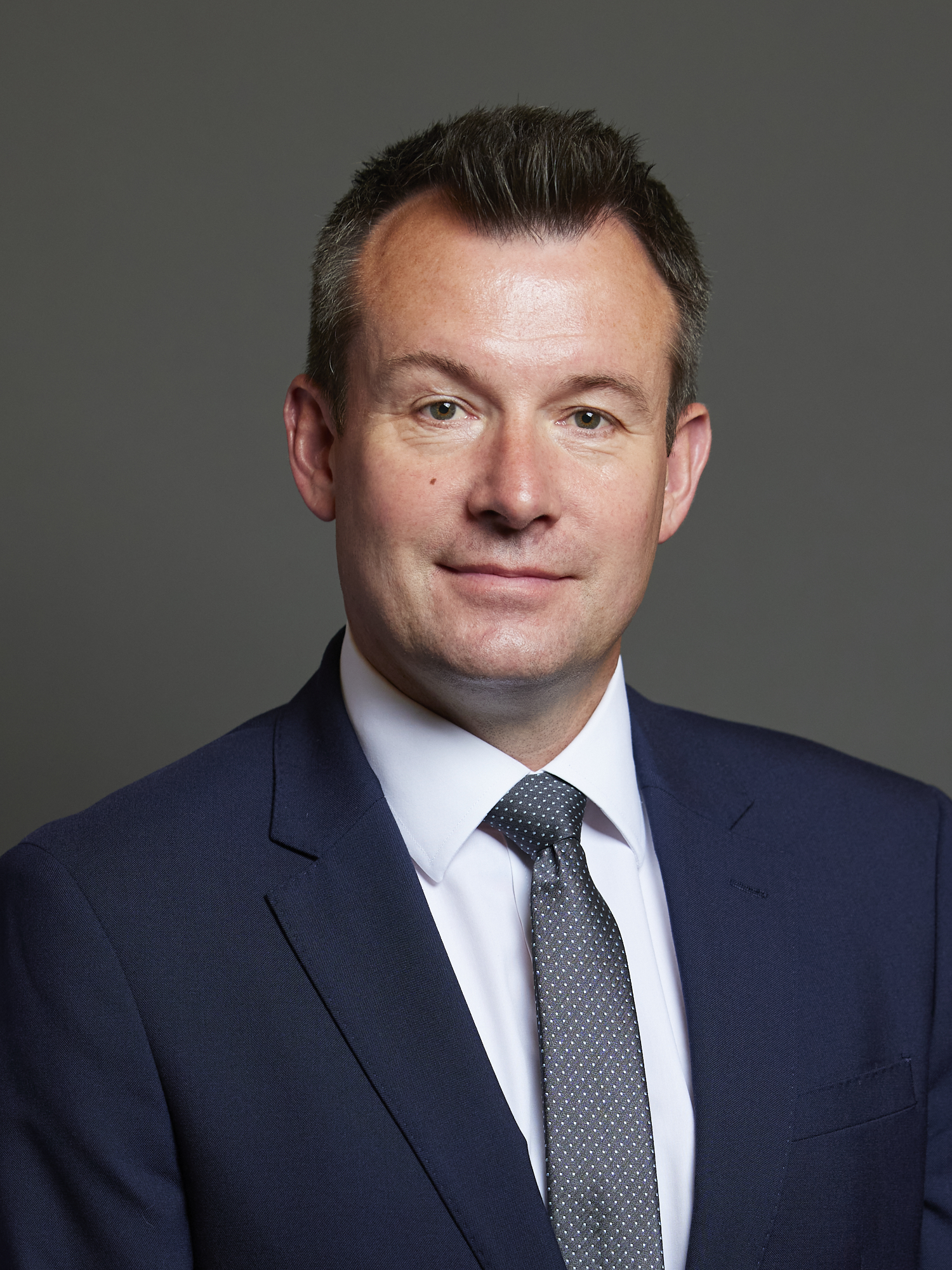
- Official portrait, 2024

Shadow Minister for War Readiness
- Incumbent
- Assumed office 13 September 2026
- Leader: Kemi Badenoch
- Preceded by: Mark Francois
- In office 19 July 2024 – 6 November 2024
- Leader: Rishi Sunak
- Preceded by: Maria Eagle
- Succeeded by: Mark Francois

Vice-Chamberlain of the Household
- In office 14 November 2023 – 5 July 2024
- Prime Minister: Rishi Sunak
- Preceded by: Jo Churchill
- Succeeded by: Samantha Dixon

Lord Commissioner of the Treasury
- In office 7 February 2023 – 14 November 2023
- Prime Minister: Rishi Sunak

Assistant government whip
- In office 8 July 2022 – 7 February 2023
- Prime Minister: Boris Johnson; Liz Truss; Rishi Sunak

Member of Parliament
- Incumbent
- Assumed office 12 December 2019
- Preceded by: Eleanor Smith
- Constituency: Wolverhampton South West (2019–2024); South Shropshire (2024–present)
- Majority: 1,624 (3.1%)

Personal details
- Born: Stuart Paul Anderson; 17 July 1976 (age 50) Hereford, Herefordshire, England
- Party: Conservative
- Spouse: Sarah Anderson (m. 2008)
- Children: 5
- Website: www.stuartanderson.org.uk
- Military career
- Allegiance: United Kingdom
- Branch: British Army
- Service years: 1993–2001
- Unit: The Royal Green Jackets

Stuart Paul Anderson (born 17 July 1976) is a British Conservative Party politician who has been the Member of Parliament (MP) for South Shropshire since 2024, as well as shadow Minister for War Readiness since September 2026. He represents the United Kingdom on the NATO Parliamentary Assembly. He was previously the MP for Wolverhampton South West from 2019 until 2024. He was Vice-Chamberlain of the Household from November 2023 until July 2024, as well as shadow Minister for Defence and Opposition Deputy Chief Whip from July to November 2024.

== Early life and military career ==
Stuart Anderson was born on 17 July 1976 in Hereford. When he was eight, his father Samuel died from a brain tumour that was triggered by skin cancer. Samuel was a corporal in the Special Air Service Regiment (22 SAS) for 12 years, going on tours to Northern Ireland, Borneo and Oman before he returned to the UK and met Stuart's mother, Leslie, who was an army nurse. His father is buried at the SAS graveyard at St Martin's Church in Hereford.

Anderson joined the army after leaving school at 16, served in the Royal Green Jackets, and was shot in the foot by a friend during a training exercise when he was 17. He served tours of duty in Northern Ireland, in Operation Banner, Bosnia, and Kosovo. At one point, Anderson attempted selection for the SAS, but was not successful. He was in the army for nine years.

== Business career ==
After leaving the army at the age of 25, Anderson worked in close protection for high-profile clients in the UK, Africa and the Middle East, including the Qatari prime minister Abdullah bin Khalifa Al Thani. He worked in over 50 countries and ran security for US federal government officials in Baghdad during the 2003 invasion of Iraq.

=== Anubis Associates ===
In 2005, Anderson co-founded Anubis Associates in Herefordshire. The company offered courses in close protection training, "operational protection" for corporate VIPs and "discreet personal protection" and consultancy services for petrochemical groups, financial institutions and stadiums.

Anubis Associates collapsed in 2012, which Anderson attributes to the end of the war on terror. He describes himself as having gone from a "paper millionaire" to being in receipt of food parcels within a month. At the time of its collapse, Anubis Associates owed £271,000 in unpaid tax and £179,000 to unsecured creditors. Administrators said that Anderson, a director and major shareholder, had received £54,000 in illegal dividends "based on forecasted profits for a future period" that never materialised. Ordered to repay the money in full, Anderson only offered £2,000, arguing that he might otherwise go personally bankrupt. The current Companies House report shows sums still 'outstanding', owed to Lloyds TSB plc and HSBC plc. Anderson said that he lost his house and ended up needing to use a food bank as a result, stating, "It was painful, but I have never hid away from what happened and have spoken many times about it".

=== eTravelSafety ===
Within a week of the collapse of his previous company, Anderson founded another based on personal security, eTravelSafety, of which he was "currently operating as CEO" at the time of the 2019 general election, according to his LinkedIn page. In December 2019 Private Eye reported that despite Anderson's professed enthusiasm for Brexit, his company had received £500,000 from the Midlands Engine Investment Fund, a government fund which receives its financial backing from the European Union, with £79 million coming from the European Development Fund and £123 million from the European Investment Bank. The article also noted that whatever the next government decided should happen to EU-funded programmes such as the Midlands Engine Investment Fund, eTravelSafety was now guaranteed its share of EU money.

According to Anderson's entry in the Register of Members' Financial Interests, on 27 February 2020, his shareholding in eTravelSafety was not more than 15% and, on 18 May 2020, his shareholdings were no longer valued at more than £70,000.

== Parliamentary career ==
Anderson was selected as the Conservative prospective parliamentary candidate for Wolverhampton South West in December 2018. He was elected to Parliament as MP for Wolverhampton South West at the 2019 general election with 48.3% of the vote and a majority of 1,661.

During the 2019 general election campaign, Anderson repeatedly pledged his support for Johnson's Brexit withdrawal agreement and said he would support a no-deal Brexit if Johnson's Withdrawal Agreement Bill were not passed.

Following the election, he was named by The Guardian as one of the seven "most controversial" new Conservative MPs, due to his receipt of an illegal dividend as a director of a now defunct company.

In January 2020, The Independent reported that Anderson appeared to have edited his own Wikipedia article (with an account named "Stuart Anderson MP") to remove information about the unlawful payments he had accepted, and made a minor correction about the directorship of one of his companies.

In October 2020, Anderson voted against an opposition day motion calling on the government to continue funding free school meals for 1.4 million disadvantaged children over the school holidays until Easter 2021 during the COVID-19 pandemic. Anderson said he opposed the motion, as he believed it was "the role of the wider welfare system to help families that require extra support" outside school term. He said that the government had temporarily increased Universal Credit by £20 a week until April 2021, although he abstained on a later opposition day motion calling on the government to stop the planned cut in Universal Credit and Working Tax Credit in April. Following the vote, empty plates were left outside his constituency office in protest. Anderson said that he had received death threats following the vote, saying, "I've been told to watch myself if I turn up anywhere. Other MPs have had a lot worse than me and some are afraid to go outside their house at the moment". The following month, the government U-turned on the policy, which Anderson welcomed.

Anderson claimed £3,598 of taxpayers' money on parliamentary expenses for utilities in 2021, more than any other MP.

During Partygate, Anderson was supportive of the prime minister, Boris Johnson, saying, "As a soldier I understand supporting people not just when they're going through good times but when they're going through bad times. The prime minister has been loyal to me and I am loyal to him". After further images of the prime minister drinking during the second lockdown were reported in the media, Anderson and Dudley North MP Marco Longhi said that the country had "moved on" from the scandal and accused sections of the media of trying to oust the prime minister for his role in delivering Brexit. Anderson later reiterated his support for Johnson's premiership during the Chris Pincher scandal.

Anderson was made an assistant government whip in July 2022.

During the July–September 2022 Conservative Party leadership election, after chief whip Chris Heaton-Harris removed the requirement for whips to remain neutral in public, Anderson endorsed Liz Truss, saying "I have worked with Liz Truss on many occasions during the past few years. I believe that her economic position, her commitment to increasing defence spending to 3% of GDP, and her parliamentary experience make her the best option to lead our country".

During the October 2022 Conservative Party leadership election, Anderson is understood to have played a role in Boris Johnson's initial exploration of a possible candidacy for the leadership, but Johnson subsequently declined to stand. After the election, he was re-appointed government whip by Rishi Sunak.

Following the 2023 Periodic Review of Westminster constituencies, Anderson's constituency was to be reincorporated as Wolverhampton West. Anderson was projected to lose his seat under the new boundaries.

In March 2023, Anderson said that he would step down at the next election. Anderson said threats against his family had influenced his decision, that his family had moved out of the area due to safety concerns and he felt he needed to protect them. In July 2023, Anderson was selected as the Conservative candidate for South Shropshire.

During Rishi Sunak's reshuffle in November 2023, Anderson was appointed Vice Chamberlain of His Majesty's Household, a senior government whip post.

At the 2024 general election, Anderson was elected to Parliament as MP for South Shropshire with 17,628 (34.1%) votes, with a majority of 1,624, down from the Conservatives' notional 2019 result of 37,752 (65.4%, majority 28,636).

With the Conservative Party now in opposition, Anderson was appointed to the interim shadow front bench as Shadow Minister of State for Defence and Opposition Deputy Chief Whip in July 2024. Due to family illness, he stepped down from his roles and returned to the backbenches in November. Later that month, he was appointed as a UK representative on the NATO Parliamentary Assembly.

In September 2026, during Kemi Badenoch's reshuffle, Anderson was appointed Shadow Minister of State for Defence for a second time. This was later announced as Shadow Minister for War Readiness on 13 September.

== Political positions ==
Anderson is a Conservative MP, and on the vast majority of issues follows instructions from his party and votes the same way as other Conservative MPs.

Anderson seldom rebelled against his party in the 2019–2024 Parliament, with two exceptions: a free vote on a bill seeking to ban demonstrations outside abortion clinics (in which 56 Conservative MPs voted for the bill and 43 against), and a vote on the Abortion (Northern Ireland) Regulations 2021 (in which 223 Conservative MPs voted in favour and 79 voted against, Anderson among them).

== Personal life ==
Anderson is married and has five children.

In his maiden speech, Anderson spoke about his experience of suicidal ideation and alcoholism following his military career, and how it led to him finding religion. Anderson is a member of the controversial evangelical Freedom Church, and his former business eTravelSafety shares the same registered business address as Freedom Church Hereford.

Parliament of the United Kingdom
Preceded by Eleanor Smith	Member of Parliament for Wolverhampton South West; 2019–2024	Constituency abolished
New constituency	Member of Parliament for South Shropshire; 2024–present	Incumbent
