= Nicholas Budgen =

British politician

Member of Parliament for Wolverhampton South West
- In office 28 February 1974 – 8 April 1997
- Preceded by: Enoch Powell
- Succeeded by: Jenny Jones

Personal details
- Born: Nicholas William Budgen; 3 November 1937 Newport, Shropshire, England
- Died: 26 October 1998 (aged 60)
- Party: Conservative
- Education: Corpus Christi, Cambridge
- Profession: Lawyer

Nicholas William "Nick" Budgen (3 November 1937 – 26 October 1998) was a British Conservative Party politician.

== Early life and career ==
Named after St Nicholas Church in Newport, Shropshire of which his grandfather was a priest, Budgen was baptised at Lichfield Cathedral by his grandfather, who had also baptised Enoch Powell, as well as marrying his parents. Thirty-seven years later Budgen would succeed Powell as the Conservative member of Parliament for Wolverhampton South West.

Budgen was educated at St Edward's School in Oxford and Corpus Christi College, Cambridge. Budgen was raised by his grandfather after his father George had been killed during the Second World War at Tobruk on 16 June 1942, one of his uncles having been killed during the First World War and another during the Second World War at Burma in March 1945.

As a member of Cambridge University Conservative Association, Peter Temple-Morris, a future Conservative MP, recalls that the first time Harold Macmillan used his famous quote "events, dear boy, events" was in response to a question Budgen had asked in a small group discussion.

During his national service he rose to the rank of lieutenant in the North Staffordshire Regiment, before transferring to the Staffordshire Yeomanry in 1959. He became a barrister at Gray's Inn in 1962. Bugden was also a very keen amateur rider under National Hunt rules and in the spring of 1971, won two steeplechases (at Market Rasen and Stratford) on his mare Jocelin, who later became the dam of the very useful steeplechaser Brown Chamberlin.

== Political career ==
In the 1970 general election he stood for the Conservatives in Birmingham Small Heath, but was unsuccessful. When the Conservative MP Enoch Powell left the party and resigned from his seat over their policy on the EEC, only six weeks before the February 1974 general election, Budgen was selected to stand for the Conservatives in Powell's old seat: Wolverhampton South West.

In 1981 Budgen was made a Conservative whip. On 8 May 1982, however, he resigned as a whip over his opposition to the creation of a Northern Ireland Assembly with no government powers. The Spectator selected him as their 1984 Backbencher of the Year. His speeches in November 1985 against the Anglo-Irish Agreement persuaded his cousin Ian Gow to resign as a minister from Margaret Thatcher's government.

According to Michael Brown, who was at the time a government whip, Budgen was the only critic of the March 1988 Budget, which contained many "giveaways" and led to high inflation and the 1990 recession. Brown described the situation in the Commons tea room after the budget as one of congratulatory atmosphere until Nick Budgen entered and proceeded to tell those present "It is the most irresponsible budget I have ever heard, it will be downhill from now on. In one fell swoop Mr Lawson has squandered five years of responsible economic management".

He was also opposed to immigration to the UK and on 10 October 1989, at the Conservative Party Conference, he, with Tim Janman MP, and Jonathan Guinness (in the chair), addressed a fringe meeting organised by the Young Monday Club, advertised as The End of the English? – Immigration and Repatriation.

Charles Moore described at Budgen's memorial service how he once rang Budgen pretending to be a racist constituent. He said that Budgen said he supported a firm immigration policy, but when pushed to agree that all immigrants should be sent home, he forcefully defended their right to be in Britain. "His distaste was palpable. I can think of many more liberal-minded MPs who might have given less firm answers to someone they thought might vote for them," he said.

Budgen came to prominence in the 1990s when he was one of the Maastricht Rebels. These eight MPs had had the Conservative whip removed for their anti-EU stance and had taken to having their own policy meetings, leading former pro-EU Prime Minister Edward Heath to describe them as "a party within a party". To Budgen the European question was an issue far more important than mere party loyalty. He had the second most rebellious voting record in the House of Commons for the period from 1979 to 1997. He is quoted as saying, "you know, this is a government you can push" and was acutely aware that John Major's government was reliant upon the right wing of its party because of its small majority in the House of Commons.

To this end, he helped lead a hardcore of approximately 50 right-wing Conservative Party MPs to influence government policy on Northern Ireland and Europe among other things. His hard line on the Northern Ireland situation was perhaps stiffened by the IRA murder of his cousin and fellow MP Ian Gow in 1990. He was popular with right-wingers not only for his intelligence but also because he had been campaigning against the UK's gradual European drift since he resigned as a government whip.

The day after a conciliatory article in The Times by Budgen, John Major returned the Conservative whip to the rebels. Additionally, of 'the whipless eight', he was the only one to vote with the government on VAT on fuel in November 1994; the government were, however, defeated, forcing the then Chancellor Kenneth Clarke to return to Parliament with a "mini budget", an unprecedented event.

It was Budgen who first mooted the idea of a referendum on the European Single Currency in 1993, with his proposed European Currency (Referendum) Bill.

Budgen was also a leading member of the Treasury Select Committee, who questioned every tax rise and criticised Kenneth Clarke as being "intellectually dishonest". It was his position on this committee that persuaded him that the Bank of England should be made independent of political interference, this led to his private members bill in 1994, an attempt to privatise the Bank of England. The bill failed; however, in 1997 when the Labour Party was in government, it made the Bank of England independent as one of its first measures.

Budgen was also vociferous in protecting the rights of gun owners following the Dunblane massacre. His speech was described in The Guardian by columnist Simon Hoggart as "one of the last great parliamentary speeches". The Dunblane bill created a situation where small calibre pistols were illegal in the UK (apart from a 3-week period in 2002 for the Commonwealth Games being held in Manchester, with British teams being forced to practise in France).

Due to his support for a referendum on the question of European integration, James Goldsmith's Referendum Party decided not to run a candidate against him. Budgen had in fact suggested to the seatless former Conservative Government minister Alan Clark that he should stand for the Referendum Party. He had said that the Conservatives "in the West Midlands will be running on alternative manifesto", presumably meaning with other local Maastricht Rebels, Christopher Gill (Ludlow) and Richard Shepherd (Aldridge & Brownhills). Despite losing with a 9.9% swing from the Conservatives to Labour, of the 144 seats that Labour gained from the Conservatives it had the joint-tenth lowest swing, and was one of only 13 seats that changed hands with a swing in single figures.

Budgen was a keen huntsman. He had hunted in 29 of the UK's counties, and in his youth was well known as a particularly fearless rider; he wrote regularly for Horse & Hound and occasionally for The Wall Street Journal, The Times, Daily Mail, Glasgow Herald and The Irish Times. Budgen was described in the Commons by one former minister as being "worth ten placeman" and by The Daily Telegraph as the "late, great Nicholas Budgen".

Nicholas Budgen died of liver cancer at Stafford General Hospital on 26 October 1998. His funeral service was near his Lichfield farm at Lichfield Cathedral, where his grandfather had been Dean. The eulogy was given by his close friend and fellow Maastricht rebel Richard Shepherd, at his memorial service at St Margaret's Church, Westminster another close friend Charles Moore gave a eulogy.

== Quotations ==
On the Downing Street Declaration which said that Britain has "no selfish, strategic or economic interest" in maintaining the Union with Northern Ireland, Budgen asked John Major the question - "Can I reassure my constituents that the United Kingdom has an interest in maintaining Wolverhampton in the Union?"

On supporting Douglas Hurd in the 1990 Conservative leadership contest: "It is the Conservative worker's fate to be betrayed by his leader, so we may at least be betrayed elegantly."

On John Major: "he would make a reasonably competent head of a Wolverhampton Social Security office."

Parliament of the United Kingdom
Preceded by Enoch Powell	Member of Parliament for Wolverhampton South West; 1974–1997	Succeeded by Jenny Jones
