= Wolverhampton South West =

Parliamentary constituency in the United Kingdom, 1950-2024

Coordinates: 52.59°N 2.17°W

- Former borough constituency for the House of Commons
- Boundary of Wolverhampton South West in West Midlands

- Location of West Midlands within England
- County: West Midlands
- Electorate: 59,846 (December 2010)
- Major settlements: Wolverhampton

1950–2024
- Seats: One
- Replaced by: Wolverhampton West

Wolverhampton South West was a constituency in the House of Commons of the Parliament of the United Kingdom. It was based in the city of Wolverhampton in the West Midlands, and was first created in 1950. (Note: As with all parliamentary constituencies since 1950, it elected one Member of Parliament (MP) by the first past the post system of election.)

Further to the completion of the 2023 Periodic Review of Westminster constituencies, the seat was abolished. Subject to moderate boundary changes, it was reformed as Wolverhampton West, which was first contested at the 2024 general election.

== History ==
Wolverhampton South West was represented by the Conservative Party for 47 years after its formation, with Labour winning it for the first time in its 1997 landslide victory. The Conservatives regained the seat in 2010, only for Labour to regain it at the next general election in 2015, before losing it again in 2019 to the Conservative Party.

The constituency was held by Enoch Powell from 1950 to 1974, a period covering his unsuccessful bid for the Conservative Party leadership in 1965 and his controversial 1968 Rivers of Blood speech, which criticised mass immigration, especially Commonwealth immigration to Britain.

== Constituency profile ==
This, in the 21st century, repeatedly marginal seat contains a mix of different areas; St Peter's, Graiseley and Park are relatively deprived inner city wards, with significant ethnic minority populations, mainly of Asian origin and are Labour voting-areas. Penn and Merry Hill are more mixed and suburban with mostly Conservative voters in times of economic prosperity. Tettenhall Regis and Tettenhall Wightwick are affluent suburbs on the western fringe of the West Midlands conurbation and are the strongest Tory wards in the seat.

The seat includes Molineux stadium, home to Wolverhampton Wanderers F.C.

In 1966, 8.4% of the constituency was born in the New Commonwealth.

== Boundaries ==
Map of boundaries 2010-2024

Wolverhampton South West is one of three constituencies covering the city of Wolverhampton, covering the city centre (including the University and Civic Centre) as well as western and south-western parts of the city. The boundaries run south from the city centre towards Penn and north-west towards Tettenhall.

1950–1955: The County Borough of Wolverhampton wards of Blakenhall and St John's, Graiseley, Penn, St George's, St Mark's and Merridale, St Matthew's, and St Philip's.

1955–1974: As above plus Park.

1974–1983: The County Borough of Wolverhampton wards of Graiseley, Merry Hill, Park, Penn, St Peter's, Tettenhall Regis, and Tettenhall Wightwick.

1983–2010: The Metropolitan Borough of Wolverhampton wards as named above

2010–2024: The City of Wolverhampton wards as named above

== History ==
Prominent frontbenchers

The unit is heavily associated with the controversial Conservative politician Enoch Powell who was MP for the seat from 1950 until 1974, when he departed to the Ulster Unionist Party. It was during this time that he served in Edward Heath's shadow cabinet, from which he was dismissed in 1968 after his controversial Rivers of Blood speech in which he predicted severe civil unrest if mass immigration from the Commonwealth continued. This speech was reportedly the result of Powell's meeting with a woman in the constituency who was the last white person living in her street.

He was succeeded by fellow Conservative Nicholas Budgen, who held the seat until 1997. Budgen is best known as one of the Maastricht Rebels of the mid-1990s.

Summary of results

Wolverhampton South West returned Conservative until a Labour candidate gained it in their 1997 landslide. Budgen was defeated in the 1997 election by Labour's Jenny Jones, a landslide victory for the party. As the next general election loomed, she announced that she would not be seeking re-election. From the 2001 general election, the constituency was represented by Rob Marris of the Labour Party for nine years until he lost it in the 2010 general election to Paul Uppal of the Conservative Party, by a margin of 691 votes. Marris regained the seat from Uppal at the 2015 general election. The 2015 result gave the seat the 14th-smallest majority of Labour's 232 seats by percentage of majority. In 2017, despite Marris standing down after 11 (non-consecutive) years as an MP and Uppal standing for a third time, the new Labour candidate, Eleanor Smith, more than doubled the Labour majority. In 2019, riding the surge from Boris Johnson's Conservative Party, Stuart Anderson was elected as the new Conservative MP for the constituency.

Other parties' candidates

Of the four other candidates standing in 2015, the UKIP candidate kept his deposit by winning more than 5% of the vote, in the year before the 2016 EU referendum. He failed to do so in the 2017 election.

Turnout

Turnout has ranged from 87.2% in 1950 to 62.1% in 2001 and in 2005.

== Members of Parliament ==
Election	Member	Party
1950	Enoch Powell	Conservative
Feb 1974	Nicholas Budgen	Conservative
1997	Jenny Jones	Labour
2001	Rob Marris	Labour
2010	Paul Uppal	Conservative
2015	Rob Marris	Labour
2017	Eleanor Smith	Labour
2019	Stuart Anderson	Conservative

== Elections ==
=== Elections in the 2010s ===
General election 2019: Wolverhampton South West
Party	Candidate	Votes	%	±%
Conservative	Stuart Anderson	19,864	48.3	▲4.1
Labour	Eleanor Smith	18,203	44.3	▼5.1
Liberal Democrats	Bart Ricketts	2,041	5.0	▲3.1
Brexit Party	Leo Grandison	1,028	2.5	New
Majority		1,661	4.0	▼1.2
Turnout		41,136	67.5	▼3.1
Conservative gain from Labour		Swing	▲4.6	

General election 2017: Wolverhampton South West
Party	Candidate	Votes	%	±%
Labour	Eleanor Smith	20,899	49.4	▲6.2
Conservative	Paul Uppal	18,714	44.2	▲3.0
UKIP	Rob Jones	1,012	2.4	▼8.3
Liberal Democrats	Sarah Quarmby	784	1.9	▼0.2
Green	Andrea Cantrill	579	1.4	▼1.2
Independent	Jagmeet Singh	358	0.8	New
Majority		2,185	5.2	▲3.2
Turnout		42,461	70.6	▲4.0
Labour hold		Swing	▲1.5	

General election 2015: Wolverhampton South West
Party	Candidate	Votes	%	±%
Labour	Rob Marris	17,374	43.2	▲4.2
Conservative	Paul Uppal	16,573	41.2	▲0.5
UKIP	Dave Everett	4,310	10.7	▲7.0
Green	Andrea Cantrill	1,058	2.6	New
Liberal Democrats	Neale Upstone	845	2.1	▼13.9
Independent	Brian Booth	49	0.1	New
Majority		801	2.0	N/A
Turnout		40,209	66.6	▼1.3
Labour gain from Conservative		Swing	▲1.9	

General election 2010: Wolverhampton South West
Party	Candidate	Votes	%	±%
Conservative	Paul Uppal	16,344	40.7	▲2.6
Labour	Rob Marris	15,653	39.0	▼4.5
Liberal Democrats	Robin Lawrence	6,430	16.0	▲2.5
UKIP	Amanda Mobberley	1,487	3.7	▲1.2
Equal Parenting Alliance	Raymond Barry	246	0.6	New
Majority		691	1.7	N/A
Turnout		40,160	67.9	▲4.8
Conservative gain from Labour		Swing	▲3.5	

=== Elections in the 2000s ===
General election 2005: Wolverhampton South West
Party	Candidate	Votes	%	±%
Labour	Rob Marris	18,489	44.4	▼3.9
Conservative	Sandip Verma	15,610	37.5	▼2.2
Liberal Democrats	Colin Ross	5,568	13.4	▲5.0
UKIP	Douglas Hope	1,029	2.5	▲0.8
BNP	Edward Mullins	983	2.4	New
Majority		2,879	6.9	▼1.7
Turnout		41,679	62.1	0.0
Labour hold		Swing	▼0.8	

General election 2001: Wolverhampton South West
Party	Candidate	Votes	%	±%
Labour	Rob Marris	19,735	48.3	▼2.1
Conservative	David Chambers	16,248	39.7	▼0.2
Liberal Democrats	Mike Dixon	3,425	8.4	▲0.2
Green	Wendy Walker	805	2.0	New
UKIP	Doug Hope	684	1.7	New
Majority		3,487	8.6	▼1.9
Turnout		40,897	62.1	▼10.3
Labour hold		Swing	▼0.9	

=== Elections in the 1990s ===
General election 1997: Wolverhampton South West
Party	Candidate	Votes	%	±%
Labour	Jenny Jones	24,657	50.4	▲10.5
Conservative	Nicholas Budgen	19,539	39.9	▼9.4
Liberal Democrats	Matthew Green	4,012	8.2	▼0.3
Liberal	Mike Hyde	713	1.5	▼0.8
Majority		5,118	10.5	N/A
Turnout		48,921	72.4	▼5.8
Labour gain from Conservative		Swing	▲9.9	

General election 1992: Wolverhampton South West
Party	Candidate	Votes	%	±%
Conservative	Nicholas Budgen	25,969	49.3	▼1.4
Labour	Simon Murphy	21,003	39.9	▲9.2
Liberal Democrats	Mark Wiggin	4,470	8.5	▼10.1
Liberal	Colin Hallmark	1,237	2.3	New
Majority		4,966	9.4	▼10.6
Turnout		52,679	78.2	▲2.7
Conservative hold		Swing	▲5.3	

=== Elections in the 1980s ===
General election 1987: Wolverhampton South West
Party	Candidate	Votes	%	±%
Conservative	Nicholas Budgen	26,235	50.7	▲0.1
Labour	Roger Lawrence	15,917	30.7	▲3.2
Alliance (SDP)	Beris Lamb	9,616	18.6	▼2.9
Majority		10,318	20.0	▼3.1
Turnout		51,768	75.5	▲3.1
Conservative hold		Swing		

General election 1983: Wolverhampton South West
Party	Candidate	Votes	%	±%
Conservative	Nicholas Budgen	25,214	50.6	▼1.1
Labour	Bob Jones	13,694	27.5	▼4.7
Alliance (SDP)	Edgar Harwood	10,724	21.5	▲8.0
Anti-Common Market	John Deary	201	0.4	New
Majority		11,520	23.1	▼3.6
Turnout		49,833	72.4	
Conservative hold		Swing		

=== Elections in the 1970s ===
General election 1979: Wolverhampton South West
Party	Candidate	Votes	%	±%
Conservative	Nicholas Budgen	26,587	52.4	▲8.3
Labour	Ivan Geffen	15,827	31.2	▼1.8
Liberal	Joseph Wernick	6,939	13.7	▼5.8
National Front	June Lees	912	1.8	▼1.5
Anti-Common Market	John Deary	401	0.8	New
Majority		10,760	21.3	▲10.1
Turnout		50,666	76.6	▲2.9
Conservative hold		Swing		

General election October 1974: Wolverhampton South West
Party	Candidate	Votes	%	±%
Conservative	Nicholas Budgen	20,854	44.2	▼1.5
Labour	Ivan Ernest Geffen	15,554	33.0	▲0.9
Liberal	Joseph Abraham Wernick	9,215	19.5	▲0.3
National Front	Garth Anthony Cooper	1,573	3.3	▲0.3
Majority		5,300	11.2	▼2.4
Turnout		47,196	73.7	▼5.9
Conservative hold		Swing		

General election February 1974: Wolverhampton South West
Party	Candidate	Votes	%	±%
Conservative	Nicholas Budgen	23,123	45.7	▼24.4
Labour	Helene Middleweek	16,222	32.1	▲8.8
Liberal	Joseph Abraham Wernick	9,691	19.2	New
National Front	Garth Anthony Cooper	1,523	3.0	New
Majority		6,901	13.6	▼23.2
Turnout		50,559	79.6	
Conservative win (new boundaries)				

General election 1970: Wolverhampton South West
Party	Candidate	Votes	%	±%
Conservative	Enoch Powell	26,220	64.3	▲5.2
Labour	Joshua Andrew Nicholas Bamfield	11,753	28.8	▼12.1
Liberal	Eric Robinson	2,459	6.0	New
Communist	Pete Carter	189	0.5	New
Independent	Gavin Menzies	77	0.2	New
Independent	Dharam Dass	52	0.1	New
Majority		14,467	35.5	▲17.3
Turnout		40,750	76.0	▲2.4
Conservative hold		Swing		

=== Elections in the 1960s ===
General election 1966: Wolverhampton South West
Party	Candidate	Votes	%	±%
Conservative	Enoch Powell	21,466	59.1	▲1.7
Labour	Alexander Collier	14,881	40.9	▲9.5
Majority		6,585	18.2	▼11.8
Turnout		36,347	73.6	▼1.7
Conservative hold		Swing		

General election 1964: Wolverhampton South West
Party	Candidate	Votes	%	±%
Conservative	Enoch Powell	21,736	57.4	▼6.5
Labour	Antony Gardner	11,880	31.4	▼4.7
Liberal	Nick Lloyd	4,233	11.2	New
Majority		9,856	26.0	▼1.8
Turnout		37,849	75.3	▼3.1
Conservative hold		Swing		

=== Elections in the 1950s ===
General election 1959: Wolverhampton South West
Party	Candidate	Votes	%	±%
Conservative	Enoch Powell	25,696	63.9	▲3.9
Labour	Eric Thorne	14,529	36.1	▼3.9
Majority		11,167	27.8	▲7.8
Turnout		40,225	78.4	▲0.7
Conservative hold		Swing		

General election 1955: Wolverhampton South West
Party	Candidate	Votes	%	±%
Conservative	Enoch Powell	25,318	60.0	▲6.4
Labour Co-op	Lewis Burgess	16,898	40.0	▼6.4
Majority		8,420	20.0	▲12.8
Turnout		42,216	77.7	▼8.6
Conservative hold		Swing		

General election 1951: Wolverhampton South West
Party	Candidate	Votes	%	±%
Conservative	Enoch Powell	23,660	53.6	▲7.6
Labour	Annie Llewelyn-Davies	20,464	46.4	▲2.0
Majority		3,196	7.2	▲5.6
Turnout		44,124	86.3	▼0.9
Conservative hold		Swing		

General election 1950: Wolverhampton South West
Party	Candidate	Votes	%	±%
Conservative	Enoch Powell	20,239	46.0	
Labour	Billy Hughes	19,548	44.4	
Liberal	William Frederick Hubert Rollason	4,229	9.6	
Majority		691	1.6	N/A
Turnout		44,016	87.2	
Conservative gain from Labour		Swing		

== See also ==
- List of Members of Parliament for Wolverhampton
- List of parliamentary constituencies in the West Midlands (county)
- List of parliamentary constituencies in Wolverhampton
