= Elsa Brändström =

Swedish nurse and philanthropist (1888–1948)

Elsa Brandström
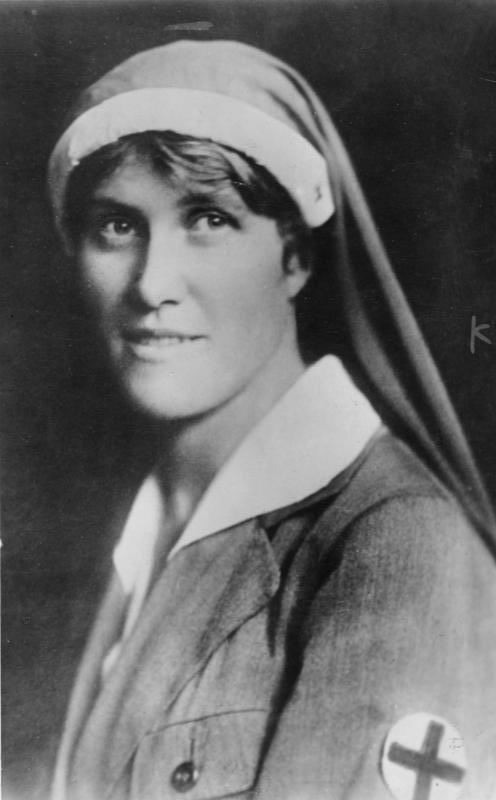
- Brandström in 1929
- Born: 26 March 1888; Saint Petersburg, Russian Empire
- Died: 4 March 1948 (aged 59); Cambridge, Massachusetts, U.S.
- Citizenship: Swedish
- Occupations: Nurse, philanthropist
- Spouse: Heinrich Gottlob Robert Ulich (m. 1929)

Elsa Brändström (26 March 1888 – 4 March 1948) was a Swedish nurse and philanthropist. She was known as the "Angel of Siberia" (German: Engel von Sibirien).

== Life and commitment ==
Elsa Brändström was born in Saint Petersburg, Russia. She was the daughter of the military attaché at the Swedish legation, Edvard Brändström (1850–1921) and his wife Anna Wilhelmina Eschelsson (1855–1913). In 1891, when she was three years old, the family returned to Sweden. In 1906, Brändström, now a major general, became the Swedish envoy at the court of Tsar Nicholas II and returned to Saint Petersburg.

Elsa spent her childhood in Linköping in Sweden. From 1906 to 1908, she studied at Anna Sandström Teachers Training College (Anna Sandströms högre lärarinneseminarium) in Stockholm but returned to Saint Petersburg in 1908. Her mother died in 1913. Elsa was in Saint Petersburg at the outbreak of World War I and volunteered for a position as a nurse in the Imperial Russian Army.

=== World War I ===
In 1915, Brändström went to Siberia together with her friend and nurse Ethel von Heidenstam (1881–1970) for the Swedish Red Cross, to introduce basic medical treatment for the German and Austrian POWs. Up to 80 percent of the POWs died of cold, hunger and diseases. As Brändström visited the first camp and witnessed the inhumane situation, she decided to dedicate her life to these soldiers. For the dedication with which she looked after men from Germany and Austria, many close to death with typhoid fever, she became known as the Angel of Siberia.

Back in Saint Petersburg, she founded a Swedish Aid organisation but her work was severely hindered by the 1917 Russian Revolution and the Bolshevik coup. In 1918, the new Soviet Russian authorities withdrew her work permit, but she did not give up and made several trips to Siberia until being arrested in Omsk in 1920. Accused of being a spy, Brändström was initially sentenced to death by the Soviet authorities. The sentence was eventually revoked and she was interned in 1920. After her release, she returned to Sweden via Stettin on the ship MS Lisboa, where the German government gave her an official public reception. Upon returning to Sweden Brändström organised fund-raising for former POWs and their families. Afterwards she emigrated to Germany.

=== Peacetime ===
In 1922, her book Bland krigsfångar i Ryssland och Sibirien was published. It was later translated and published as Among prisoners of war in Russia & Siberia (London: Hutchinson. 1929). From then onwards she looked after former POWs in a rehabilitation sanatorium for homecoming German soldiers at Marienborn-Schmeckwitz in Saxony. She bought a mill named Schreibermühle close to Lychen in Uckermark and used it as re-socialization centre for former POWs. Schreibermühle had extensive lands including fields, forest and meadows on which potatoes and other crops could be grown. This was most useful at that time because the German Mark was an unstable currency and lost value from day to day.

In 1923, she undertook a six-month tour in the United States, giving lectures to raise money for a new home for children of deceased and traumatised German and Austrian POWs. On her trip she raised US$100,000 and traveled to 65 towns. At a stop at Gustavus Adolphus College in St. Peter, Minnesota, Brändström wore clothing of the Swedish Red Cross and "spoke about her thrilling experiences in Russia and Siberia during and after the war."

In January 1924, she founded a children's home, Neusorge, in Mittweida, which had room for more than 200 orphans and children in need. In Siberia she had promised many German soldiers, who were dying, that she would care for their children.

In 1929 she married her great love Heinrich Gottlob Robert Ulich, a German professor of pedagogy. Afterwards, she moved together with him to Dresden. In 1931, she sold the Schreibermühle and donated her other home, Neusorge, to the Welfare Centre in Leipzig. She founded the Elsa Brändström Foundation for Women, which awarded scholarships to children from Neusorge. On 3 January 1932, her daughter Brita was born in Dresden. In 1933, Robert Ulich accepted a lectureship at Harvard University and in consequence the family moved to the United States. Here Brändström gave aid to newly arrived German and Austrian refugees. In 1939, she opened the Window Shop, a restaurant which gave work opportunities for refugees in Cambridge, Massachusetts.

=== World War II ===
At the end of World War II, she started to raise funds for starving and shelterless women and children in need in Germany through the organisations CARE International (Co-operative for American Relief in Europe) and CRALOG (Council of Relief Agencies Licensed for Operation in Germany). Sizable funds were collected from Americans and especially from German Americans, who accounted for over 25% of the American population. She undertook a final lecture tour in Europe on behalf of the "Save the Children Fund".

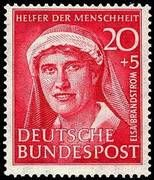
Elsa Brändström as depicted on a German postage stamp issued in 1951

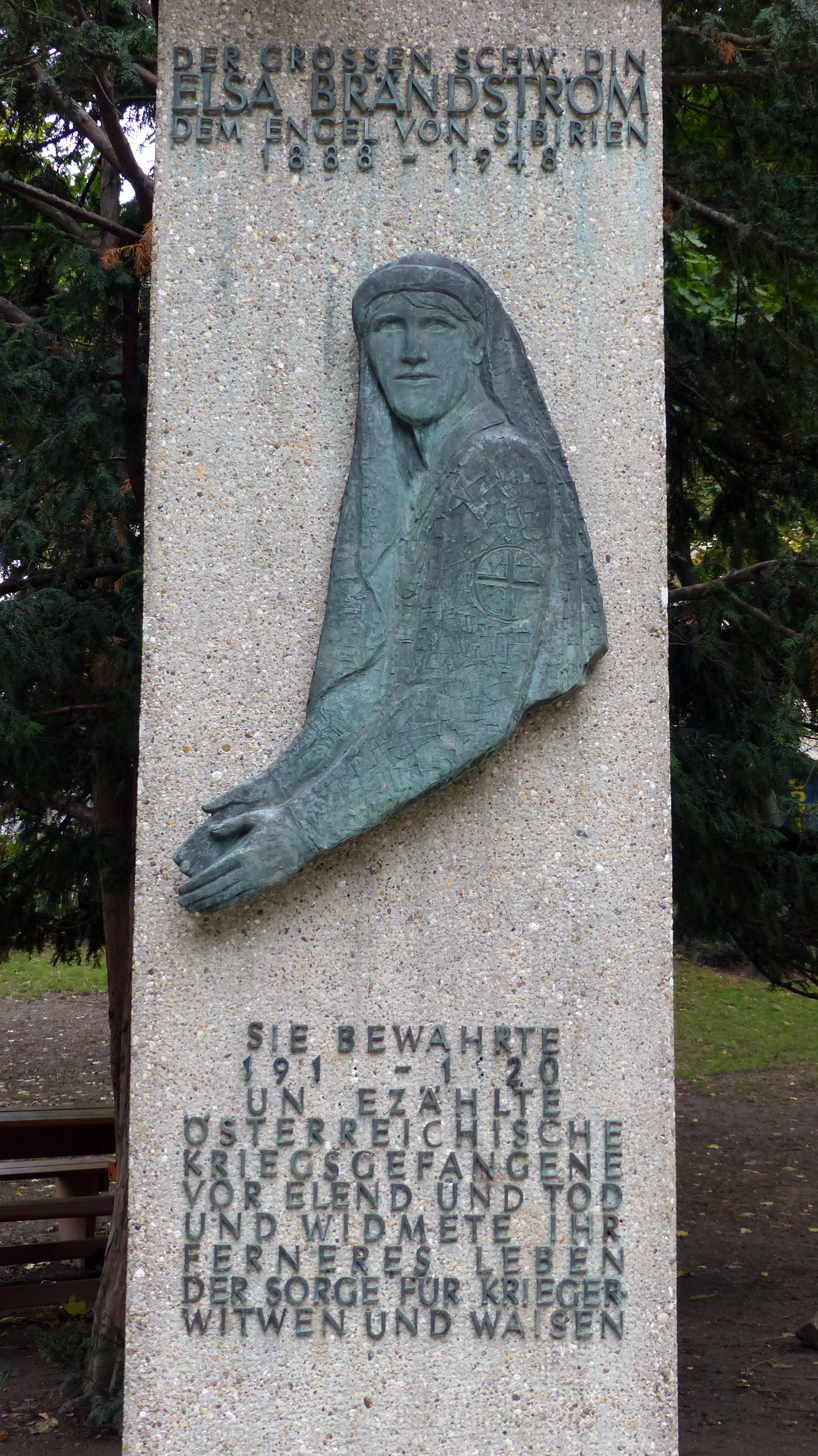
Monument to Elsa Brändström at Arne-Karlsson-Park in Vienna

== Death ==
Brändström could not undertake her last planned journey to Germany because of illness. She died in 1948 of bone cancer in Cambridge, Massachusetts at the age of 59. While her daughter Brita stayed with her husband and children in the U.S., her husband Robert returned to Germany, where he died in 1977 at Stuttgart.

== Honours and memory ==
Because of her commitment to POWs, Brändström became famous as a "patron saint" for soldiers. In Germany and Austria, many streets, schools and institutions are named after her.

"The war has brought about many heroines in various nations, but in my opinion, never again someone, who is more worthy of being honoured than Elsa Brändström." – General Alfred Knox, British Military Attaché in Russia.

Among countless medals, awards and honours, Brändström was awarded the Silver Badge of the German Empire (German: Silberplakette des Deutschen Reiches) and the golden Seraphim Medal (Swedish: Serafimermedaljen). She was awarded the Illis quorum in 1920. Brändström was also nominated for the Nobel Peace Prize "Heroine of Peace" five times: in 1922, twice in 1923, 1928 and 1929.

=== In memory of Brändström ===
A ceremony at Arne-Karlsson-Park in Vienna on 16 September 1965 preceded the official opening of the XXth International Conference of the Red Cross. In the presence of Austrian civilian and military authorities, members of the Swedish colony, leaders of the Austrian Red Cross and many conference delegates, a monument to Elsa Brändström was unveiled. This monument, by the sculptor Robert Ullmann, stands as a testimony of gratitude to the famous Swedish nurse's work for German-Austrian prisoners during the First World War.

Severals schools have been named after Elsa Brändström, particularly in Germany, but also in Sweden, such as Elsa-Brändström-Schule (Bonn), Elsa Brändströms skolan (Linköping) and Elsa-Brändström-Schule (Frankfurt am Main).

== Work ==
- Elsa Brändström: Bland Krigsfångar i Ryssland och Sibirien 1914–1920, Norstedt, Stockholm (1921).
- Elsa Brändström: Unter Kriegsgefangenen in Rußland und Sibirien – 1914–1920, Leipzig, Koehler & Amelang (1927)
- Hanna Lieker-Wentzlau (ed.) and Elsa Brändström: Elsa Brändström-Dank – Das Ehrenbuch nordischer und deutscher Schwesternhilfe für die Kriegsgefangenen in Sibirien, Becker/Säeman/Heliand
