= 1972 Birthday Honours =

British government recognitions

The 1972 Queen's Birthday Honours were appointments to orders and decorations of the Commonwealth realms to reward and highlight citizens' good works, on the occasion of the official birthday of Queen Elizabeth II. They were announced in supplements to the London Gazette of 23 May 1972 for the United Kingdom, Australia, New Zealand, Mauritius, Fiji, and Barbados. At this time honours for Australians were awarded both in the United Kingdom honours on the advice of the premiers of Australian states, and also in a separate Australia honours list.

The recipients of honours are displayed here as they were styled before their new honour, and arranged by honour, with classes (Knight, Knight Grand Cross, etc.) and then divisions (Military, Civil, etc.) as appropriate.

== United Kingdom and Commonwealth ==
=== Life Peer ===
Baron

- Brigadier Sir Bernard Edward Fergusson, GCMG, GCVO, DSO, OBE. For public services.
- Sir Harold Samuel. For public and charitable services.

=== Privy Counsellor ===
- The Right Honourable Charles Frank, Baron Byers, OBE, Leader of the Liberal Party, House of Lords.
- Rodney Graham Page, MBE, MP, Minister for Local Government and Development.
- The Honourable Billy Mackie Snedden, QC, Treasurer for the Commonwealth of Australia.
- Sir Burke St. John Trend, GCB, CVO, Secretary of the Cabinet.

=== Knight Bachelor ===
- Allan Ivor Baker, CBE, Chairman, Baker Perkins Holdings Ltd. For services to Export.
- Donald James Barron, Chairman, Rowntree Mackintosh Ltd. For services to Export.
- Derek Harold Richard Barton, Hofmann Professor of Organic Chemistry, Imperial College of Science and Technology, University of London.
- Professor Misha Black, OBE. For services to industrial design.
- Paul Elmore Oliver Bryan, DSO, MC, MP. For political and public services.
- John Lawie Burgess, OBE, TD, DL. For public services in Cumberland.
- Sydney Morris Caffyn, CBE. For charitable services.
- William Oscar Carter, President, The Law Society.
- The Right Honourable Frederick Vernon Corfield, MP. For political and public services.
- Colonel William Robert Crawshay, DSO, ERD, TD, DL. For public services in Wales.
- Martin Davies, CBE, Director, National Gallery.
- Donald Macleod Douglas, MBE, Professor of Surgery, University of Dundee.
- Professor Kingsley Charles Dunham, Director, Institute of Geological Sciences, and Foreign Secretary of the Royal Society.
- Ernst Hans Josef Gombrich, CBE, Professor of the History of the Classical Tradition, University of London.
- John Ritchie Inch, CVO, CBE, QPM, Chief Constable, City of Edinburgh Police Force.
- William Johnston Keswick, Director, Bank of England.
- Anthony Carey Lewis, CBE, Principal, Royal Academy of Music.
- Patrick Arthur Macrory. For public services in Northern Ireland.
- Peter Thomson Menzies, Chairman, Electricity Council.
- Richard Anthony Meyjes, Head of Business Team, Civil Service Department.
- Edward Henry Nichols, TD, Town Clerk, City of London.
- Montague Illtyd Prichard, CBE, MC, Chairman, Perkins Engines Group Ltd. For services to Export.
- Leonard Redshaw, Assistant Managing Director, Vickers Ltd. For services to Export.
- William Reid, CBE. For services to the North East.
- James Maude Richards, CBE. For services to Architecture.
- Sydney Thomas Franklin Ryder, Chairman and Chief Executive, Reed International Ltd.
- Colonel Geoffrey Peter Shakerley, CBE, MC, TD, Chairman, (Executive Council, County Councils Association.
- Robert Edward Graham Shillington, CBE, Chief Constable, Royal Ulster Constabulary.
- John Arthur Stallworthy, Nuffield Professor of Obstetrics and Gynaecology, University of Oxford.
- Andrew Stephen, Chairman, The Football Association.
- Professor Michael Meredith Swann, FRS, Principal and Vice-Chancellor, University of Edinburgh.
- John Aked Taylor, OBE, TD, DL. For political and public services in Yorkshire.

Diplomatic Service and Overseas List

- Lieutenant-Colonel Jeffrey Carlton Astwood, CBE, ED, Speaker of the House of Assembly, Bermuda.
- The Honourable Gilbert Alexander Cooper, CBE, ED. For public services in Bermuda.
- The Honourable John Anthony Holt Saunders, CBE, DSO, MC, JP. For services to banking in Hong Kong.

Australian States
State of New South Wales

- Arthur Thomas George. For services to the Australian-Greek community, universities and sport.
- George Mervyn Gray, CVO, CBE, Under Secretary and Permanent Head of the Premier's Department and Secretary to the Cabinet.
- John Hedley Douglas Marks, CBE. For services to hospitals and the community.

State of Victoria

- The Honourable George Oswald Reid, QC, MP, Attorney-General and Chief Secretary.

State of Queensland

- The Honourable Alan Roy Fletcher, MLA, Minister for Education and Cultural Activities.
- Councillor James Graham Walker, MBE, of Longreach. For community services, particularly in the field of local government.

State of Tasmania

- The Honourable Mr Justice George Hunter Crawford, Senior Puisne Judge of the Supreme Court of Tasmania.

=== Order of the Bath ===
==== Knight Grand Cross of the Order of the Bath (GCB) ====
Military Division

- General Sir John Antony Jervis Read, KCB, CBE, DSO, MC, ADC (Gen.), (62631), late Infantry, Colonel Commandant The Light Division, Colonel Commandant Small Arms School Corps, Colonel Commandant Army Catering Corps.
- Air Chief Marshal Sir Frederick Rosier, KCB, CBE, DSO, ADC, Royal Air Force.

Civil Division

- Sir Arnold William France, KCB, Chairman, Board of Inland Revenue.

==== Knight Commander of the Order of the Bath (KCB) ====
Military Division

- Vice Admiral John Edward Ludgate Martin, CB, DSC.
- Lieutenant-General John Houghton Gibbon, CB, OBE, (91397), late Royal Regiment of Artillery, Colonel Commandant Royal Regiment of Artillery.
- Air Vice-Marshal Peter de Lacy Le Cheminant, CB, DFC, Royal Air Force.

Civil Division

- Idwal Vaughan Pugh, CB, Second Permanent Secretary, Department of the Environment.
- Henry Gabriel Ware, CB, HM Procurator General and Treasury Solicitor.
- Lieutenant-Colonel The Right Honourable Sir Martin Michael Charles Charteris, KCVO, CB, OBE, Private Secretary to The Queen and Keeper of Her Majesty's Archives.

==== Companion of the Order of the Bath (CB) ====
Military Division

Royal Navy

- Commandant Daphne Mary Blundell, Hon. ADC, Women's Royal Naval Service.
- Rear Admiral Hilary Charles Nicholas Goodhart.
- Surgeon Rear Admiral Rex Philip Phillips, OBE, QHS.
- Rear Admiral Charles William Haimes Shepherd, CBE.
- Rear Admiral Alan Christopher Wyndham Wilson.
- Sidney Palmer, OBE, RCNC.

Army

- Major-General Ronald Edward Coaker, CBE, MC, (378164), late Royal Armoured Corps, Colonel 17th/21st Lancers.
- Major-General Henry Holland Evans (66675), late Royal Army Educational Corps.
- Major-General Peter Howard Girling, OBE, (95692), late Corps of Royal Electrical and Mechanical Engineers.
- Major-General Michael Stephen Hancock, MBE, (73072), late Royal Corps of Signals, Colonel Commandant Royal Corps of Signals.

Royal Air Force

- Air Vice-Marshal Reginald Edward Wynyard Harland.
- Air Vice-Marshal Frederick Desmond Hughes, CBE, DSO, DFC, AFC.
- Air Vice-Marshal Brian Pashley Young, CBE.

Civil Division

- Albert Gwyra Beynon, Chief Veterinary Officer, Ministry of Agriculture, Fisheries and Food.
- Wilfred Burns, CBE, Deputy Secretary and Chief Planner, Department of the Environment.
- Joan Davies Cooper, Director of Social Services, Department of Health and Social Security.
- Leonard Richard Creasy, OBE, Director of Civil Engineering Development, Department of the Environment.
- Brian Arthur Cullum Duncan, CBE, QC, Judge Advocate General of HM Forces.
- Robert Fell, CBE, Secretary, Export Credits Guarantee Department.
- Gordon Neville Gadsby, Chief Scientific Officer (A), Ministry of Defence.
- Frank Dickinson Lawton, Solicitor, Department of Employment.
- Alan Lord, Deputy Chairman, Board of Inland Revenue.
- Norman Jordan-Moss, CMG, Deputy Secretary, Department of Health and Social Security.
- Edward Hurry Palmer, Comptroller of Defence Lands, Ministry of Defence.
- Sidney John Palmer, OBE, Deputy Director General, Ships, Ministry of Defence.
- Leo Pliatzky, Deputy Secretary, HM Treasury.
- William George Pottinger, CVO, Secretary, Department of Agriculture and Fisheries for Scotland.
- Patrick Shea, OBE, Permanent Secretary, Ministry of Education for Northern Ireland.
- Geoffrey Ward Stallibrass, OBE, Controller, National Air Traffic Services, Department of Trade and Industry.

=== Order of Saint Michael and Saint George ===
==== Knight Commander of the Order of St Michael and St George (KCMG) ====
- Archibald Laurence Patrick Kirwan, CMG, TD, Director and Secretary, Royal Geographical Society.

Diplomatic Service and Overseas List

- Frank Dixey, CMG, OBE, FRS, Consulting Hydrogeologist to the Department of Water Development, Cyprus.
- John Nicholas Henderson, CMG, HM Ambassador, Warsaw.
- Charles Peter Hope, CMG, TD, HM Ambassador, Mexico City.
- Sir Robert Lucien Morrison Kirkwood. For services to Anglo-Jamaican relations and to the sugar industry.
- Frederick Archibald Warner, CMG, HM Ambassador-designate, Tokyo.

==== Companion of the Order of St Michael and St George (CMG) ====
- John Lewis Jones, Assistant Secretary, Ministry of Defence.
- Jacob Jordan Watson, Counsellor (Labour), British Embassy, Washington.
- Cyril Montgomery White, QC, Chairman, Foreign Compensation Commission, Foreign and Commonwealth Office.
- Lawrence John White, Assistant Secretary, Board of Customs and Excise.

Diplomatic Service and Overseas List

- The Most Reverend George Appleton, MBE, Anglican Archbishop in Jerusalem.
- Rae Gordon Britten, lately British Deputy High Commissioner, Dacca.
- Edward Peter Nayler de Haan, OBE, Counsellor, Foreign and Commonwealth Office.
- John Boyd Denson, OBE, lately British Chargé d'Affaires, Peking.
- John Alexander Noble Graham, Counsellor, Foreign and Commonwealth Office.
- Edward Firth Henderson, HM Ambassador, Qatar.
- Ernest Gordon Lewis, OBE, Governor, Falkland Islands.
- Reginald Louis Secondé, CVO, Counsellor, Foreign and Commonwealth Office.
- Charles James Treadwell, HM Ambassador, Abu Dhabi.

Australian States

State of Victoria

- His Honour Judge George Leo Dethridge, Chairman of County Court Judges, County Court of Victoria.

State of Queensland

- Frank Victor Sharpe, OBE, ED, of Brisbane. For his services to aviation and to the avocado industry.

=== Royal Victorian Order ===
==== Knight Grand Cross of the Royal Victorian Order (GCVO) ====
- The Right Honourable Charles John, Viscount Cobham, KG, GCMG, TD.

==== Knight Commander of the Royal Victorian Order (KCVO) ====
- Brigadier Geoffrey Paul Hardy-Roberts, CB, CBE.
- Lieutenant-Colonel Eric Charles William Mackenzie Penn, CVO, OBE, MC.

==== Commander of the Royal Victorian Order (CVO) ====
- The Right Honourable (Elizabeth) Vere Drummond, Baroness Birdwood, MVO.
- Edwin Richard Cawston.
- Rear-Admiral Anthony Davies, CB.
- Alice Anne Hawkins, MVO.
- Herbert Harry Hobbs, CB.
- Albert Charles Edward Musk, MVO.
- Albert Edward Perkins, MVO, Commander, Metropolitan Police.
- Commodore Courtenay Alexander Rives Shillington, CB, VRD, DL, Royal Naval Volunteer Reserve (Retired).

==== Member of the Royal Victorian Order (MVO) ====
At this time the two lowest classes of the Royal Victorian Order were "Member (fourth class)" and "Member (fifth class)", both with post-nominal letters MVO. "Member (fourth class)" was renamed "Lieutenant" (LVO) from the 1985 New Year Honours onwards.

Fourth Class

- Commander Lionel Armitage Bird, Royal Navy.
- Sidney Scholfield Campbell.
- Captain Ian Walter Farquhar, The Queen's Own Hussars.
- Surgeon Commander Philip Fulford, Royal Navy.
- Oswald Gillespie, Chief Superintendent, Metropolitan Police.
- The Reverend Canon James Seymour Denis Mansel.
- Geoffrey Montague Fenwick Stow.

Fifth Class

- Mary Ashby.
- David Frederick Batson.
- Marie Lilian Greiner.
- George Edward Wilson.

==== Medal of the Royal Victorian Order (RVM) ====
In Silver

- Thomas William Bell.
- 2028660 Corporal of Horse Cyril Benjamin Blake, The Life Guards.
- Sydney William Bloomfield.
- Michael Silvester Donoghue.
- Leslie Hoskin.
- Chief Marine Engineering Artificer David Leonard Moody P/MX 857740.
- Catherine Josephine O'Neill.
- Yeoman Bed Goer Edward Cyril Parfett, Her Majesty's Bodyguard of the Yeoman of the Guard.
- William Roper.
- 305026 Corporal of Horse Stanley Vaudin, The Life Guards.
- James Watt.
- Cyril Alfred Webb.
- Arthur Leslie Wrixen.

Bar to the Royal Victorian Medal (in Silver)

- Arthur Ernest Henness.

=== Order of the British Empire ===
==== Knight Grand Cross of the Order of the British Empire (GBE) ====
Civil Division

- Sir Hamilton Edward de Coucey Howard, Bt., Lord Mayor of London.

==== Dame Commander of the Order of the British Empire (DBE) ====
Civil Division

- Unity Viola Lister, OBE. For political and public services in London.
- The Right Honourable Bridget Horatia, Baroness Plowden. For services to Education.

==== Knight Commander of the Order of the British Empire (KBE) ====
Military Division

- Vice Admiral Louis Edward Stewart Holland Le Bailly, CB, OBE.
- Lieutenant-General Allan MacNab Taylor, MC, (126636), late Royal Armoured Corps.

Civil Division

- The Right Honourable John Alexander, Viscount Goschen, OBE. For political and public services.
- David Charles Beresford Holden, CB, ERD, Permanent Secretary, Ministry of Finance for Northern Ireland, and Head of the Northern Ireland Civil Service.
- Colonel Arthur Noble, CB, DSO, TD, Vice-Chairman, Council of Territorial Auxiliary and Volunteer Reserve Associations.
- Frank Wood, CB, Secretary, Ministry of Posts and Telecommunications.
- The Right Honourable Kenneth Gilmour Younger, lately Director, Royal Institute of International Affairs.

Diplomatic Service and Overseas List

- Walter Frederick Pretyman. For services to agriculture and industry in Brazil.
- Gordon Arthur Ransome, CBE, lately Professor Emeritus, Faculty of Medicine, University of Singapore.

Australian States

State of Victoria

- The Honourable Gilbert Lawrence Chandler, CMG, MLC, Government Leader in the Legislative Council.

==== Commander of the Order of the British Empire (CBE) ====
Military Division

Royal Navy

- Captain Joseph Charles Brandt.
- Commodore Ian Crawford Davenport, VRD, Royal Naval Reserve.
- Commodore William Richard Dalrymple Gerard-Pearse, MVO.
- Captain Bernard Henry Notley.

Army

- Brigadier Alleyne John Addy (73102), Royal Pioneer Corps.
- Brigadier John Myles Brockbank, MC, (176700), late Royal Armoured Corps.
- Colonel Maurice George Harvey, OBE, MC, (360192), late Infantry.
- Colonel Francis Robert Henn (112980), late Royal Armoured Corps.
- Colonel Lloyd Howell (335392), late Royal Army Educational Corps.
- Brigadier Arthur Walmesley-White (73064), late Corps of Royal Engineers.
- Colonel Rodney Francis Maurice Windsor, ADC, (326157), late Royal Armoured Corps (Territorial and Army Volunteer Reserve) now R.A.R.O.

Royal Air Force

- Air Commodore Roger Mortimer.
- Air Commodore Harry Charles Southgate, MBE.
- Group Captain George John Aylett, MBE.
- Group Captain Christopher Roger Gartside Neville, OBE.
- Group Captain John Edward Smith, AFC.

Civil Division

- Ralph John Attenborough, MBE, Chief Executive and Deputy Chairman, Matthew Hodder Ltd. For services to Export.
- Alan Bainton, Controller (Operations), Prison Department, Home Office.
- Leslie William Bear, lately Editor of the Official Report, House of Commons.
- Alexander Ross Belch, Managing Director, Scott Lithgow. For services to Export.
- Philip Hugh Penberthy Bennett, Chairman, Building Regulations Advisory Committee.
- William Thomas Charles Berry, lately Principal Medical Officer, Department of Health and Social Security.
- Stanley Ernest Blackstone, Director, Hudswell Badger Ltd.
- George Herbert Blanchard. For political and public services in the Midlands.
- Robert Oxton Bolt, Playwright.
- John Eveleigh Bolton, DSC, lately Chairman, Committee of Inquiry on Small Firms.
- John, Michael Worthington Bosworth, Vice Chairman, British Railways Board.
- Stanley Bowen, Crown Agent for Scotland.
- Edward John Mostyn Bowlby, Deputy Director, Tavistock Clinic.
- Alice Grace Jenny, Lady Bragg, Chairman, National Marriage Guidance Council.
- Andrew Breach, Past President, Building Societies Institute.
- John Henshaw Britton. For services to the Magistracy in Bristol.
- Sidney Thomas Broad, County Education Officer, Hertfordshire County Council.
- Joan Dillon Browne, Principal, Coventry College of Education.
- Robert Nigel Beresford Dalrymple Bruce, OBE, TD, Chairman, South Eastern Gas Board.
- Philip Lionel Burton, Assistant Secretary, Civil Service Pay Research Unit.
- James Edward Chick, Executive Chairman, Simon Carves Ltd. For services to Export.
- George Harold Coates, MBE, ERD, lately Director, Post Office Headquarters, Northern Ireland.
- Cyril Vernon Connolly, Author and Journalist.
- John Warcup Cornforth, FRS, Director, Milstead Laboratory, Shell Research Ltd.
- Anthony Wakefield Cox, Partner, Architects' Co-Partnership.
- Professor Robert Craigie Cross. For services to Higher Education.
- James Carlisle Stormonth Darling, MC, TD, Director, The National Trust for Scotland.
- James Alan Davie, Painter.
- John Kenneth Dick, Chairman and Managing Director, Mitchell Cotts Group Ltd., and lately Chairman, British National Export Council for Middle East Trade. For services to Export.
- John Drinkall, Member, lately Chairman, British Wool Marketing Board.
- Henryk Jerzy Elwertowski, lately Deputy Chief Scientific Officer, Admiralty Compass Observatory, Ministry of Defence.
- Vernon Newbury Ely, Chairman, Ely's Ltd. For services to the retail trades.
- Arthur Samson Foot, Deputy Director, National Institute for Research in Dairying, Shinfield.
- Ian James Fraser, MC, lately Director-General, Panel on Takeovers and Mergers.
- Abraham Edward Hardy Frost, Foreign and Commonwealth Office.
- George Thomas Gedge, Director of Manufacturing, British Aircraft Corporation Ltd.
- Geoffrey Gilbertson, Personnel Manager (Labour), Imperial Chemical Industries.
- Maurice Owen Gill, Chairman, Medway Ports Authority.
- Peter Witheridge Grafton, Quantity Surveyor, Partner, G. D. Walford & Partners.
- Michael Mountjoy Hallett. For services to the iron founding industry.
- Frederic Walter Harris. For political and public services.
- The Right Honourable George St. Vincent, Baron Harris, MC. For public services in Kent.
- William Hogarth, General Secretary, National Union of Seamen.
- Brian Harry Holbeche, Headmaster, King Edward's School, Bath.
- Wilfred Hollinrake, County Treasurer, Somerset County Council.
- Richard Robert Hopkins, Personnel Director, Vauxhall Motors Ltd.
- Frank Robert Hornby, MBE, Chief Officer, Council for National Academic Awards.
- James Findlay Hosie, OBE, Chief Scientific Officer, Science Research Council.
- Alfred George Howe, TD, Chairman and Managing Director, The Steel Group Ltd. For services to Export.
- The Right Honourable Lloyd, Baron Kenyon, DL. For public services in Wales.
- Jack Howard Kirby, Chairman and Director, The International Tanker Owners Pollution Federation Ltd., lately President, Chamber of Shipping.
- Edward Michael Lambert, lately Director, Employers' Federation of Papermakers and Boardmakers.
- Keith Eric Lauder, Town Clerk, London Borough of Barking. For services to the London Boroughs' Association.
- Harry Heath Leedale, Controller of Surtax, Board of Inland Revenue.
- William Morison Little, Deputy Chairman and Managing Director, Scottish Transport Group.
- Harry Lomas, Chief Officer, Manchester Fire Brigade.
- The Reverend Prebendary Donald MacLeod Lynch, Chief Secretary, Church Army.
- Ronald Henry Moray Mayor, lately Director, Scottish Arts Council.
- Bertram Desmondelbrook. For services to the Construction Industry.
- John David Bawden Mitchell, Salvesen Professor of European Institutions, University of Edinburgh.
- The Honourable Nancy Mitford, Writer.
- John Moores. For charitable services to Youth and the Arts in Merseyside.
- Jeremy Noah Morris, Professor of Public Health, London School of Hygiene & Tropical Medicine.
- Angus Fraser Murray, lately Joint Secretary and Investment Manager, Prudential Assurance Company Ltd.
- John Nowell Linton Myres, FBA. For services to Archaeology and Bibliography.
- Percy Howard Newby, Director of Programmes, Radio, BBC.
- Marshall Nixon, MBE, TD, Engineer, Trent River Authority.
- Professor Robert Kemsley Orr, Chairman, Scottish Opera.
- Thomas Harry Parkinson, DL, Town Clerk, Birmingham City Council.
- Abram Sydney Myers Peel. For political and public services in Yorkshire.
- Jacob Glyndwr Picton, Vice-Chairman, Birmingham Regional Hospital Board.
- Sydney Plaister. For political services in the Midlands.
- David Hermon Andrew Price, Assistant Director (Chemical), Department of the Environment.
- Llewelyn Ralph Price, Chairman, Honeywell, and Honeywell Information Systems. For services to Export.
- Robert Guy Pulvertaft, Director, Orthopaedic and Accident Services, Derbyshire Royal Infirmary.
- John Ross Raeburn, Strathcona-Fordyce Professor of Agriculture, University of Aberdeen.
- Joseph Shepherd Richardson. For services to local government in Blackpool.
- Brian Lawson Salmon, Vice-Chairman, Board of Governors, Westminster Hospital Group.
- Geoffrey William Searle, DSC, Chairman of the Executive Committee and Director of Finance and Planning, BP. For services to Export.
- John James Byam Shaw, Art Historian.
- Robert Wilson Shaw. For services to Rugby Football in Scotland.
- Patience Sheard, Alderman, Sheffield City Council and Member, Clean Air Council.
- James Francis Shearer, OBE, Member, Royal Ordnance Factories Board.
- David Dury Hindley-Smith, Registrar, The General Dental Council.
- James Eric Smith, Secretary, Marine Biological Association and Director, Plymouth Laboratory.
- John Berriman Smith, formerly Assistant Secretary, Department of Trade and Industry.
- Edwin Solomon, QPM, DL, Chief Constable, West Midlands Constabulary.
- Frederick John Speight. For services to the Passenger Vehicle Operators Association.
- Derek Paul Stevenson, Secretary, British Medical Association.
- Arthur Tiley. For political and public services.
- Alan Gordon Ward, OBE, Procter Professor of Food and Leather Science, University of Leeds.
- Bernard Spencer Wheble. For services to International Trade and Export.
- Gerald Edward Leaman Whitmarsh. For public services in Devonshire.
- Professor Gerald Percy Wibberley. For services to countryside planning.
- Professor Basil Selig Yamey, Member, Monopolies Commission.

Diplomatic Service and Overseas List

- Mr. Justice Hector Barcilon, lately Puisne Judge, Bermuda.
- Peter Brian Baxendell. For services to British commercial interests in Nigeria.
- The Honourable George Frederick Lawrence Charles, JP. For public services in St. Lucia.
- The Honourable Gerald Hugh Choa, JP, Director of Medical and Health Services, Hong Kong.
- Derek George Cudmore, OBE, Governor, British Virgin Islands.
- John Parmenas Eustace. For services to the community in St. Vincent.
- Archibald Galbraith Fleming. For services to British commercial interests in San Francisco.
- Charles James Gomez, OBE, Finance Officer, Gibraltar.
- John Bertram William Grigson, MBE. For services to British interests in Ceylon.
- James Richard Holt. For services to British interests in Thailand.
- William Ernest Evan Kirkham, MBE, Deputy Commissioner for Prisons, Uganda.
- Edward Robert Hugh Paget, OBE, British Council Representative, Australia.
- Thomas Pickett, lately Judge President of the Court of Appeal for Zambia.
- The Honourable James Jeavons Robson, JP, Director of Public Works, Hong Kong.
- Mr. Justice Hedworth Cunningham Smith, Puisne Judge, Bahama Islands.
- Victor Thomas Smithyman, OBE, QPM, Commissioner, Royal Swaziland Police Force.
- Walter Arthur Soundy, OBE. For services to the British community in El Salvador.
- Professor Doreen Mary Elizabeth Vermeulen-Cranch. For services to medicine in the Netherlands.

Australian States

State of New South Wales

- Sidney Hamilton Beadnall Chambers. For services to the motor car industry, the community and cricket.
- Gordon James McCartney. For services as Chairman, Development Corporation of New South Wales.
- Norma Alice Parker (Mrs. Brown). For services to education and child welfare.

State of Victoria

- Wilfred Deakin Brookes, DSO, of Toorak. For services to the State and to charity.
- Frederick Ormond Watts, of Eaglemont. For services to the building industry.

State of Queensland

- Robert Andrew Macquarie Miller, of Brisbane. For services to medicine.
- Edward Fergus Sidney Roberts, of Brisbane. For services to the grazing industry.

State of Tasmania

- Campbell Amiet Duncan. State Director of Pathology.

==== Officer of the Order of the British Empire (OBE) ====
Military Division

Royal Navy

- Commander Philip Thomas Bryant.
- Commander Philip James Stewart Coombes, RD, Royal Naval Reserve.
- Acting Captain Harold Kenneth Dean.
- Commander Reginald William Gilbert Few.
- Commander Kenneth David Frewer.
- Commander Geoffrey James Vivian Harris.
- Commander John Anthony Clive Moulson.
- Chief Officer Natalie Angela Swainson, Women's Royal Naval Service.
- Commander Gilbert Sidney Tilzey.
- Major Frederick Charles Townsend, Royal Marines.
- Commander William James Woolley.

Army

- Lieutenant-Colonel Alfred John Adcock (379279), The King's Regiment.
- Lieutenant-Colonel David William Anderson (397169), The Royal Highland Fusiliers (Princess Margaret's Own Glasgow and Ayrshire Regiment).
- Lieutenant-Colonel Ronald Ernest Crump (435567), Royal Regiment of Artillery.
- Lieutenant-Colonel Colin Derek Cokayne Frith (362764), The Light Infantry, now R.A.R.O.
- Lieutenant-Colonel Patrick Stanley Dillon Griffin (95180), Royal Regiment of Artillery.
- Lieutenant-Colonel John Henry Winfield Haddon (371026), The Royal Green Jackets, now R.A.R.O.
- Colonel (Acting) Douglas Frederick Howard Kelly, TD, (219334), Army Cadet Force.
- The Reverend Leslie Lloyd Jones, Chaplain to the Forces Second Class (236104), Royal Army Chaplains' Department.
- Lieutenant-Colonel Thomas David Lloyd-Jones (422564), The Royal Regiment of Fusiliers.
- Lieutenant-Colonel Frederick Charles Lockwood (403523), Royal Corps of Signals.
- Lieutenant-Colonel Alistair William MacLachlan McKinnon (403754), Royal Corps of Signals.
- Lieutenant-Colonel Charles John Howell Mann, TD, (411777), Royal Army Medical Corps (Territorial and Army Volunteer Reserve).
- Lieutenant-Colonel Roger Brook Marriott (295655), The Royal Regiment of Fusiliers.
- Lieutenant-Colonel John Lionel Pownall (403654), 16th/5th The Queen's Royal Lancers.
- Lieutenant-Colonel Peter Jocelyn Carne Ratcliffe (349737), Grenadier Guards.
- Lieutenant-Colonel David Peter Rowat (403672), 5th Royal Inniskilling Dragoon Guards.
- Lieutenant-Colonel Allan Patrick Skinner (372645), Royal Army Pay Corps.
- Lieutenant-Colonel John Francis Thomas (346187), Corps of Royal Military Police.
- Lieutenant-Colonel John Peter Barry Condliffe Watts, MC, (415012), The Royal Irish Rangers (27th (Inniskilling) 83rd and 87th).
- Lieutenant-Colonel Robert Wheatley, MBE, (403972), Corps of Royal Engineers.

Overseas Award

- Lieutenant-Colonel John Joseph Porral, ED, Officer Commanding, The Gibraltar Regiment.

Royal Air Force

- Acting Group Captain Denis Walker Barber.
- Acting Group Captain Harold Charles Wallace.
- Wing Commander William David Askham (3137962).
- Wing Commander Frederick Clark Barter, AFC, (55223).
- Wing Commander James Cartwright, MBE, (152632).
- Wing Commander Cyril Raymond Johnson, AFC, (153413).
- Wing Commander Harold Arthur Langridge, MBE, (591795).
- Wing Commander Graham Trevor Smeaton (3044746).
- Wing Commander Peter Arthur Michael Sylvester, BEM, (569216).
- Wing Commander Peter Malvern Wilson (503521).
- Wing Commander Leckey Robert Scott Ferguson Wright (55459).
- Acting Wing Commander James Cecil John Farrell (550660), Royal Air Force Volunteer Reserve (Training Branch).

Civil Division

- Robert Hopewell Addlesee, Director of Labour and Staff Relations, West Midlands Passenger Transport Executive.
- Allen Aldington, Vice Chairman, Pharmaceutical Group, Royal Society of Health.
- Robert George Alexander, President, Scottish Building Societies Association.
- Arthur Lloyd-Allen, Alderman, Poole Borough Council.
- John Wood Allen, Chairman, Westmorland Agricultural Executive Committee.
- Ronald George Allen, Director of Research, Water Research Association.
- Leonard Atherton, MBE, lately General Manager, Industrial Relations, British Overseas Airways Corporation.
- Elizabeth Joyce Atkinson, Headmistress, Northgate Grammar School for Girls, Ipswich.
- William John Baker, President, National Federation of Anglers.
- Jessie Halliburton Beckett, Education Officer, Central Midwives Board for Scotland.
- Norman Beeby. For political and public services in the Midlands.
- Richard Onslow Beeston, Director of Education, Burnley County Borough.
- Mary Laetitia Bernard, Secretary, Yeomanry Benevolent Fund.
- Noel Berryman, MBE, Vice-Chairman, London Regional Industrial Savings Committee.
- Joseph Lewis Blonstein, Chairman, Amateur Boxing Association.
- Alfred Brooks, General Secretary, National Union of Bank Employees.
- George Johnstone Brown, HM Inspector of Schools (Higher Grade), Scottish Education Department.
- Lawrence James Bruce, Principal Professional and Technology Officer, Department of the Environment.
- Trevor Burgin, Headmaster, Spring Grove Primary School, Huddersfield.
- Nathalie Mackenzie Caine, Adviser on Nursery Education, Birmingham.
- Stanley Clifton Calder, Director, Papworth Village Settlement and Enham Village Centre.
- Roderick Macrae Campbell, Senior Administrative Medical Officer, Northern Regional Hospital Board, Scotland.
- Philip Jack Henry Candy, Deputy Assistant Commissioner, Metropolitan Police.
- William Thomas Cavey, QPM, Chief Constable, Cumbria Constabulary.
- Eric Lionel Claridge. For political and public services in the Midlands.
- Albert Arthur Clay. For political and public services in Wessex.
- Jocelyn Courtenay Cockroft, President, Women's Advisory Council on Solid Fuel.
- John Peden Coleman, Chairman, Gresham Lion Group Ltd.
- William Robert Collingwood, General Manager, London Stations, British European Airways.
- Denys Irvine Coomber, Senior Principal Scientific Officer, Laboratory of the Government Chemist.
- John Neve Cooper, General Manager, East European Division, Shell International.
- Alexander James Cormack, Member, Economic Development Committee for the Motor Vehicle Distribution and Repair Industry.
- Mark Garnett Cowlishaw. For services to Hockey.
- Lucy Mary Craig, Sister Superintendent and Principal Tutor, Middlesex Hospital.
- Stewart Hunter Cruden, Principal Inspector of Ancient Monuments (Scotland), Department of the Environment.
- Eileen Davies, President, Denbighshire Branch, British Red Cross Society.
- John Charles Clifford Davies, Chairman, Letraset Ltd. For services to Export.
- Richard de Soldenhoff, lately Consultant Obstetrician and Gynaecologist, Ayrshire.
- Philip Shepley Wilson-Dickson, MBE, HM Inspector of Fire Services.
- James Louis Christian Dilcock. For services to the Magistracy in Walsall.
- Robert Dinnage. For services to the National Association of Boys' Clubs, Manchester.
- Reginald William Doak, Chief Inspector, Gaming Board for Great Britain.
- Henry William Donovan, Vice Chairman, Birmingham National Health Service Executive Council.
- Jocelyn Anita Downer (Miss Jocelyn Barrow), lately Member, Community Relations Commission.
- Edwin Arthur Drew, Chief Engineer, Middle Lee Regional Drainage Scheme.
- John Spence Drummond, TD, Chairman, Greenock, Port Glasgow and District Local Employment Committee.
- Evan Roger Edwards, lately Managing Director, Rees Edwards Ltd.
- James Henry Embling, Headmaster, Oxhey Wood Junior School, Watford, Hertfordshire.
- William Stanley English, Station Director, Luddington Experimental Horticulture Station, Ministry of Agriculture, Fisheries and Food.
- Harold Roy Evans. For services to Table Tennis.
- Henry Evans, Chairman, Merseyside and North Wales Electricity Consultative Council.
- Allen Exley, MBE, Chairman, Colne Local Savings Committee.
- Thomas Fergus, Corporation Secretary, Scottish Industrial Estates Corporation.
- Norman William Ferguson, Chief Accountant, Department of Trade and Industry.
- Helena Wilton Foster, Regional Administrator, North-Eastern Region, Women's Royal Voluntary Service.
- Maurice Foster, Senior Inspector of Taxes, Board of Inland Revenue.
- Arthur Frederick Frayling. For services to the fur industry.
- John Furness, Alderman, Birkhenhead County Borough Council.
- John Garston, Executive Director and General Manager, Hawker Siddeley Aviation Ltd. For services to Export.
- Bertram Jeffries Gee, Director and General Manager, United Transport Company Quarry Holdings Ltd.
- Henry George Gilbert, Senior Signals Officer, Department of Trade and Industry.
- Kenneth Leslie Goodall, lately HM Senior Chemical Inspector of Factories, Department of Employment.
- Stephen Thomas Henri Grady, Superintendent, Eastern Mediterranean Area, Commonwealth War Graves Commission.
- Stanley Gretton, General Secretary, Bakers' Union.
- Leslie Valentine Grinsell. For services to Archaeology.
- Samuel Gross, Chairman and Joint Managing Director, Gross Cash Registers Ltd. For services to Export.
- Donald Boswell Gurrey, Foreign and Commonwealth Office.
- Arthur Salmond Hamilton, lately Borough Surveyor and Engineer, Blackpool.
- Doriald Hildreth, Senior Supply and Transport Officer, Ministry of Defence.
- Charles James Robert Hill. For services to the Royal Air Forces Association in Wales.
- John Douglas Hinchcliff, Senior Principal Scientific Officer, Ministry of Defence.
- Norah Mary, Lady Hoare, President and Chairman, The Society for the Aid of Thalidomide Children.
- Bernard Aloysius Hodges, Secretary, Institution of Heating and Ventilating Engineers.
- Peggy Lilian Hodges, Deputy Guided Weapons Projects Manager (Systems), Marconi Space and Defence Systems Ltd.
- Rosamond Agnes Hone, Principal Tutor, St. Thomas' Hospital.
- Cliffordena Ray Marie Horsfall, Headmistress, Lakenham Infant School, Norwich.
- John Basil Horsman, Clerk to the Justices, Wigan.
- Edward Hoyle, Area Director, South Yorkshire Area, National Coal Board.
- John Hutchinson, FRS. For services to Botany.
- Herbert Israel Jacob, Chairman, British Amateur Wrestling Association.
- Bertha Holland James. For services to the elderly in North West Kent.
- William John Jobson, ERD, Regional Architect, Sheffield Regional Hospital Board.
- Cecil George Johnson, lately Senior Principal Scientific Officer, Rothamsted Experimental Station, Harpenden, Hertfordshire.
- George Frederick Johnson, lately Principal, Grantham College for Further Education.
- David Henry Johnston, MBE, Assistant Chief Constable, Royal Ulster Constabulary.
- James Anderson Johnstone, Executive Director Marketing, Hawker Siddeley Aviation Ltd. For services to Export.
- John Eilian Jones. For political and public services in Wales.
- Igor Kaye, lately Librarian, The Royal Society.
- Stephen Wynyard Kaye, Assistant Managing Director, Tubes Division, British Steel Corporation. For services to Export.
- William Kelsall, QPM, Deputy Chief Constable, Cheshire Constabulary.
- Kenneth Alfred Killip, Managing Director, Channel Television.
- Thomas Athwell Kirk, Lieutenant-Colonel, Salvation Army; Director, British Red Shield Services.
- Norbert Kitz, Technical Director, Control Systems Ltd.
- John Knox, ERD, Service Controller, North Eastern Telecommunications Region, Post Office.
- Francis Joseph Kohner, Chairman, Belart Ltd., Glengormley, County Antrim.
- David Kyle, General Medical Practitioner, Brecon.
- Anne Marguerite Lamb, Deputy Chief Nursing Officer, Department of Health and Social Security.
- George Arthur Lawrenson, President, Association of Certifying Factory Surgeons.
- Leonard Lee, Commander, County of Leicester and Rutland St. John Ambulance Association and Brigade.
- The Reverend Ian William Lewis. For services to the community in Halifax.
- Herbert Lisle, General Secretary, Amalgamated Society of Textile Workers and Kindred Trades.
- Geoffrey Brian Longbottom, Director and Divisional Manager, The Hymatic Engineering Company Ltd., Redditch. For services to Export.
- Colin Anderson Lucas. For services to Architecture.
- James Samuel Victor McAllister, DFC, DFM. For services to the Air Training Corps in Northern Ireland.
- Wing Commander William Hunter McGiffin, Member, Northern Ireland Territorial Auxiliary and Volunteer Reserve Association.
- Lieutenant-Commander Lachlan Ronald Duncan Mackintosh of Mackintosh, Royal Navy (Retired). For political and public services in Scotland.
- James Alexander Macnabb, TD, Vice-President, National Federation of Housing Societies.
- Derek McVitty, Senior Principal Scientific Officer, Ministry of Commerce for Northern Ireland.
- John Patrick Maule, lately Director, Commonwealth Bureau of Animal Breeding and Genetics.
- William Meharg, MBE, Assistant Chief Constable, Royal Ulster Constabulary.
- Patrick James Monkhouse. For services to the Peak Park Planning Board.
- Dennis Morgan, Deputy Managing Director, Dowty Mining Equipment Ltd., Cheltenham. For services to Export.
- Douglas Morgan, Principal, Welsh Office.
- Cyril George Lidstone Morley, lately Deputy Director, Department of Mechanical and Electrical Engineering, Greater London Council.
- Peter Victor Morris, Principal, Ministry of Defence.
- Peter Henry Morrison. For services to the Royal College of Music.
- Harry Morton, Organiser of Technical Subjects, Lanarkshire Education Authority.
- John Morton, DFC, Director, Chandler, Hargreaves, Whittall & Company Ltd.
- Percival Stanley Mundy. For services to the Royal British Legion in Bristol and West Midlands.
- Flora Anne Rachel Murray. For services to the Lindsey and Holland County Associations of Parish Councils, Lincolnshire.
- Harold Myerscough. For political and public services in the South East.
- Leslie Charles Myerscough, Manager, Quality Control Department, The Radiochemical Centre Ltd. For services to Export.
- Antony Harold Newton. For political services.
- Henry Alleyne Nicholson, Provost, Kirkcaldy.
- Christine Mary Orton, BEM. For local services in Warwickshire.
- Sydney Robert Victor Paramor, Principal Telecommunications Superintendent, External Telecommunications Executive, Post Office.
- Archibald Paterson, lately Chief Civil Engineer, British Railways Board.
- Roger Hewitt Paul. For political and public services in East Anglia.
- Harold Lloyd Payne, Executive President, National Federation of Far Eastern Prisoners of War Clubs and Association of Great Britain and Northern Ireland.
- Lawrence du Garde Peach, Author and Dramatist.
- Robert Molesworth Peacock, Senior Partner, W. & H. Peacock, Chartered Surveyors and Auctioneers.
- Eric Pearson, Educational Building Consultant, Department of Education and Science.
- Anne Orr Penney, Director of Nursing Services, Surrey County Council.
- James Pinkerton, Chairman, Clyde Agricultural Executive Committee.
- Arthur Eric Pinkett, Senior Advisory Officer for Music in Schools, Leicestershire.
- Anthony Thomas George Pocock, Sales Manager, Oxford University Press.
- David Brinley Powell, Principal, Department of Health and Social Security.
- William Robert Prew, Chief Driving Examiner, Department of the Environment.
- Kathleen Proud, General Secretary, London Council of Social Service.
- William George Purves, WS, Sheriff Clerk of Chancery in Scotland.
- Herman Gabriel Ramm, Investigator I, Royal Commission on Historical Monuments (England).
- Harry Enos Randall. For services to refugees.
- David Walter Ranson, Technical Adviser, Ministry of Defence.
- Francis Rowlinson Ratcliff, Chairman and Joint Managing Director, Ratcliffs (Great Bridge) Ltd. For services to Export.
- Ernest Raymond, Author.
- Andrew Renton, Senior Partner, Renton, Howard, Wood Associates, Architects.
- Stanley Reynolds, Chairman, Wrexham and District Employment Committee.
- Robert Benjamin Leslie Ridge, General Practitioner, Enfield, Middlesex.
- Dorothy Lilian Roberts. For political services in the North of England.
- Ernest Arthur Roberts, Nuclear Submarine Support Manager, Vickers Shipbuilding Group Ltd.
- Alpheus John Robotham, DL, Chairman, Derby National Insurance Local Tribunal.
- George Rendle Rolston. For services to the community in Haslemere, Surrey.
- The Reverend Peter Roth, Principal, Camphill Village Trust, Botton, Yorkshire.
- Alexander Buchanan Russell, Rector, Kelso High School, Roxburghshire.
- Percy Edward Russell, Principal Probation Officer, Hampshire Probation and After-Care Service.
- Denis Hubert Geoffrey Salt. For services to the Scout Association in Shropshire.
- Giuseppe Umberto Salvi. For services to the wine and spirit trade.
- Norman Stanley Sceats, Chief Finance Officer, Cwmbran Development Corporation and Mid-Wales Newtown Development Corporation.
- Ernest Howard Shepard, MC, Artist and Illustrator.
- Derek Peter Esmond Shepherd, VRD, Commercial Director, Vosper Thornycroft Ltd. For services to Export.
- Frederick Leon Michael Shepley, Controller, European Services, External Broadcasting, British Broadcasting Corporation.
- Alfred Shimeld, Headmaster, Wellington County Secondary School for Boys, Shropshire.
- John Anthony Stafford, Director, Rank Precision Industries Ltd. For services to Export.
- George Christopher Stanley, Vice-Chairman, Board of Governors, Moorfields Hospital Group and Royal Marsden Hospital Group.
- John Stewart, QFSM, Firemaster, Lanarkshire Fire Brigade.
- Sheana Mary Strachan, MBE, Foreign and Commonwealth Office.
- Anthony Stuart, Secretary, Leicestershire Association of Parish Councils.
- Charles Randolph Taylor, Leader, Royal Opera House Orchestra.
- Harry Taylor. For public services in Stoke-on-Trent.
- Lawrence Taylor, Senior Captain, British Overseas Airways Corporation and Chairman, British Airline Pilots' Association.
- Maurice Edgar Taylor. For services to the agricultural industry in Northern Ireland.
- Harold Leslie Theobald, Principal, Cabinet Office.
- Vera Elizabeth Thorn, Principal Information Officer, Central Office of Information.
- Michael Grosvenor Thornton, Director, The Centre for International Briefing.
- Ian Teasdale Twyford, Principal Scientific Officer, Foreign and Commonwealth Office (Overseas Development Administration).
- Dorothy Ethel Vallins, Headmistress, The Grammar School for Girls, Cleethorpes.
- Eric Vernon, Consultant Surgeon to the Isle of Man Health Services Board.
- Ruben Viner, Chairman and Managing Director, Viners Ltd. For services to Export.
- Noel Aaron Treasure Vinson, Editor, Western Morning News.
- George Cummings Walton, TD, Consultant, Hammerson Property and Investment Trust Ltd.
- John Walter Ward, Head of Roads Department and Consultant, Sir Alexander Gibb and Partners.
- Arthur Brian Ware, Principal, Brathay Hall, Ambleside.
- James Austin Warhurst, lately Head of Planning, British Council.
- Alfred Watson, Chairman, West Riding of Yorkshire Agricultural Executive Committee.
- James Robertson Watson, Treasurer, Rutherglen Town Council.
- Stewart McDougall Watson, BEM, Mayor, Newport County Borough Council, Monmouthshire.
- William James Webb, lately Editor-in-Chief, West Midlands Press Group.
- William Henry Westphal, DFC, Managing Director, Rentokil Group Ltd. For services to Export.
- Arthur Hamil Westwood, lately Assay Master, Birmingham Assay Office.
- John White, lately Executive Director and General Manager, Hawker Siddeley Aviation Ltd., Brough. For services to Export.
- James Allan Wilen, Chairman, British Food Manufacturing Industries Research Association.
- John Thomas Williams, Director of Engineering, National Ports Council.
- James Campbell Williamson, MC, TD. For services to economic development in North East Scotland.
- Tom Woodhouse. For services to the community in Bridlington and district.

Diplomatic Service and Overseas List

- Phyllis Mary Bassarab, Head of English Department, British Institute, Paris.
- Kenneth Anthony Bishop, First Secretary, HM Embassy, Bonn.
- Audrey Eileen Bradford, British Council Officer, Ibadan, Nigeria.
- Frederick John Bradshaw, lately First Secretary and Consul, HM Embassy, Brussels.
- John Buhagiar, lately Honorary British Consul and Trade Correspondent, Conakry.
- John Ivor Burns, Commandant, Sharjah Police Force.
- Pauline Chan. For services to industry in Hong Kong.
- Kenneth William Chesterman, lately HM Consul (Commercial), Hamburg.
- Frank Barrington Chevallier, QPM, Deputy Commissioner, Malawi Police Force.
- James Morell Clark. For services to British interests in Bordeaux.
- Arthur John Collins, lately First Secretary and Head of Chancery, British Deputy High Commission, Dacca.
- Henry Walter Joseph Connor. For services to British commercial interests in the Soviet Union.
- Anthony Bruce Cross, Surgeon Specialist, Medical Department, British Solomon Islands Protectorate.
- Garth Douglas Curtis. For services to British commercial interests in Libya.
- David Hay Davidson. For services to British commercial interests in Malaysia.
- Barnett Deakin. For services to British commercial interests in Kenya.
- Carlton Leslie Evelyn de Castro. For services to the economy of the British Virgin Islands.
- James McEleney Doherty. For services to British interests in Ecuador.
- Owen Osborne Ellum. For services as General Manager, Cable & Wireless Limited, Jamaica.
- Kenneth William Forrow, JP, Deputy Accountant General, Hong Kong.
- Hugh Frederick Sherston Fuller, MBE, Permanent Secretary, Premier's Office and Secretary to the Cabinet, British Honduras.
- Walter Fraser Grieve, lately First Secretary (Aid) and Head of Chancery, British High Commission, Gaborone.
- Leonard Arthur Griffiths, lately First Secretary, British High Commission, Singapore.
- Ernest Hainsworth, lately Director, Tea Research Institute of East Africa, Nairobi.
- Adelaide Gladys Trimingham, Lady Hall, MBE. For welfare services, particularly to the blind, in Bermuda.
- Desmond Hayward Hill, Professor and Head of the Department of Veterinary Medicine, University of Ibadan, Nigeria.
- Kenneth James Holt. For services to British interests in India.
- Leslie Victor Norman Hudson. For services to the British community in Rio de Janeiro.
- William West Hutton, lately General Manager, Agricultural Development Corporation, Kenya.
- Peter Martin Kiek. For services to British cultural interests in Mexico.
- Daniel Lam See-hin, JP. For services to trade and industry in Hong Kong.
- Donald Liao Poon-huai, JP, Commissioner for Housing, Hong Kong.
- Jonathan Campbell Longbotham, MBE, First Secretary (Economic), HM Embassy, Stockholm.
- George Kinnear Macdonald, Director of Engineering, Malawi Broadcasting Corporation.
- Ian Hamish MacDonald. For services to British commercial interests in Mauritius.
- James Nairn Macpherson, lately Works Manager, Public Works Department, The Gambia.
- Alexander Robinson Mathieson, Professor and Head of Chemistry Department, Ahmadu Bello University, Nigeria.
- Philip Dale Mitchell, TD. For services to British interests in Finland.
- David Montgomery, First Secretary (Commercial), HM Embassy, Bangkok.
- Edward Hewitt Nichols, JP, Director of Agriculture and Fisheries, Hong Kong.
- Donald Augusto Pagliero, DFC. For services to the British community in Antwerp.
- Colin Watson Peck, MBE, Honorary British Vice-Consul, Stavanger.
- Arthur Agenet Plant. For services to British interests in Beirut.
- The Reverend William Park Rankin. For services to the blind in Ethiopia.
- Derek Michael Roff, First Secretary, United Kingdom Delegation to the European Communities, Brussels.
- James Shannon Russell, Director of Public Works, Swaziland.
- George Dyson Sacker, Senior Livestock Improvement Officer, Ministry of Animal Industry, Game and Fisheries, Uganda.
- Ian Joseph Sayer, JP. For services to British interests in Malaysia.
- John Alfred Shorten, First Secretary, HM Embassy, Rome.
- Jaroslav Pavel Svehlik. For services to British interests in Nigeria.
- Clement Garry Thibou. For public services in St. Christopher-Nevis-Anguilla.
- Thomas Russell Thomson, JP, Director of Civil Aviation, Hong Kong.
- Dudley James Toomey. For services to surgery in Gibraltar.
- Neville Ericson Watty, Secretary, Department of Planning and Development, Dominica.
- Richard Anthony Wellington, DSO, DFC, lately First Secretary, HM Embassy, Rio de Janeiro.
- Thomas Stephens West. For services to public health in Nigeria.

Australian States

State of New South Wales

- Alderman James Francis Carr. For services to local government.
- John Ross Cribb. For services to transport.
- Francis Frederick Kraegen. For services to industry.
- The Right Reverend Ernest Kenneth Leslie, Bishop of Bathurst.
- Kathleen Constance Grant McAlister. For services to the community.
- Walter George Spooner. For services to local government.
- Donald Stanley Stewart. For services to industry.

State of Victoria

- Nathan Hirsch Beller, JP, of Toorak. For services to the community, especially to the Jewish community.
- Councillor Charles Edward Brown, of Ballarat, For services to local government and the community.
- John Terence Cahill, of Camberwell. For services to medicine.
- Edward Alexander Cato, of Toorak. For charitable services in the field of medicine.
- The Venerable Percival Hensby Dicker, Archdeacon Emeritus, Diocese of Wangaratta.
- Councillor McGregor Dowsett, JP, Mayor of the City of Geelong. For services to the community.
- Councillor Norman Joseph Oliver, of Bendigo, For services to local government and the community.
- Councillor William Thwaites, of Yannathan. For services to local government and the community.

State of Queensland

- Richard George Fry, of Cairns. For services to North Queensland industry and to the community.
- Mary McLean Hancock, of Brisbane. For philanthropic activities and services to the community.
- Evelyn Violet McIntyre, of Labrador. For services to women.
- Robert Roy Richter, of Brisbane. For services to the oil-drilling industry.
- Edric Dudley Summerson, of Brisbane. For services to commerce.

State of Tasmania

- Thornton John Carins, of Longford. For services to local government and the community.
- John Dexter Valentine, of Launceston. For services to journalism and the community.

==== Member of the Order of the British Empire (MBE) ====
Military Division

Royal Navy

- Lieutenant Commander James Gerald Bridges Armstrong.
- Engineer Lieutenant (A.E.) Frederick John Blackwell.
- Engineer Lieutenant (L.) Alfred John Brunger.
- Lieutenant Commander Royston Dunn.
- Lieutenant Commander (S.D.) (G.) Alfred Eugene Fenton.
- Lieutenant Commander (S.C.C.) William Henry, Royal Naval Reserve.
- Instructor Lieutenant Commander Maurice Charles Johnson.
- Wardmaster Lieutenant John Lyons.
- Instructor Lieutenant David John Roberts.
- Lieutenant Commander (S.D.) (A.V.) Leslie William Spinks.
- Engineer Lieutenant (HULL) Donald William Thorpe, formerly serving with the Royal Naval Training Team, Nigeria.
- Quartermaster Sergeant (C.) Colin Vincent John Wheeler, CH/X 4805.

Army

- Major (Q.G.O.) Asalbahadur Limbu (426755), 7th Duke of Edinburgh's Own Gurkha Rifles.
- Major (Quartermaster) Arthur Bell (469980), Irish Guards.
- Captain (Quartermaster) Timothy Wynford Alexander Best (473794), Army Catering Corps.
- 22845143 Warrant Officer Class I Ivan Frederick Butters, Corps of Royal Electrical and Mechanical Engineers.
- Major Anthony Edward Carter (370713), The Duke of Edinburgh's Royal Regiment (Berkshire and Wiltshire).
- Major David Edward Cox (430274), The Royal Regiment of Wales, lately serving with the Royal Brunei Malay Regiment.
- Major Peter Luxford Cutler (368736), The Royal Regiment of Wales.
- Major Robert Oswald Davies (382017), Intelligence Corps.
- Captain (Quartermaster) Geoffrey Raymond Davison (474253), Royal Regiment of Artillery.
- Major George Henry Alastair Douglas (314003), Royal Army Ordnance Corps.
- Major Laurence Percy Farrar L'Estrange (444815), The Parachute Regiment (Territorial and Army Volunteer Reserve).
- Major (Quartermaster) Thomas Anderson Ferrier, MM, (472674), The Queen's Royal Irish Hussars.
- 23480761 Warrant Officer Class I (Acting) Roger George French, Royal Corps of Signals.
- Major (Quartermaster) Douglas Herbert John Glisson (463651), Coldstream Guards now R.A.R.O.
- Major Peter Foster Gregson (427798), Royal Tank Regiment.
- 14461528 Warrant Officer Class I (Local) Aubrey Alfred Hopewell, Royal Corps of Signals.
- 2671091 Warrant Officer Class I Frederick Peter Horsfall, Coldstream Guards.
- Major Robert Jukes-Hughes (426925), Corps of Royal Engineers.
- Major (Quartermaster) Arthur Frank Ladd (472460), Royal Regiment of Artillery.
- Major Anthony Graham Laurie-Chiswell (433079), The Devonshire and Dorset Regiment.
- Major Percy George Frank Martin (164293), Royal Army Pay Corps.
- Major Anthony John Lindsay Molesworth (449013), Royal Regiment of Artillery.
- Major John Anthony Montague (420889), Royal Corps of Signals.
- Captain (Quartermaster) Alan Norris (480225), The Black Watch (Royal Highland Regiment).
- Captain (Acting) Jack Henry Race (195318), Army Cadet Force.
- Major (Acting) Eric Frank Randall (460804), Combined Cadet Force.
- Lieutenant (Quartermaster) Joseph Claridge Roseblade (468080), The Royal Regiment of Fusiliers (Territorial and Army Volunteer Reserve).
- Major David Ruttledge (85644), The Light Infantry.
- Major (Quartermaster) Kenneth John Richard Sawyer (432981), Corps of Royal Engineers (Territorial and Army Volunteer Reserve).
- Major (Quartermaster) Albert Henry Sedgwick (452984), The Green Howards (Alexandra, Princess of Wales' Own Yorkshire Regiment).
- Major Henry James Seed (Retired) (323854), R.A.R.O. late Royal Army Ordnance Corps.
- Lieutenant-Colonel Michael Chandos Merrett Steele (420928), Royal Regiment of Artillery.
- Major Robin Lynn Stevens (451323), The Duke of Wellington's Regiment (West Riding).
- Major (Quartermaster) Thomas Sturgeon (474708), The Royal Irish Rangers (27th (Inniskilling) 83rd and 87th).
- Captain Reginald Cecil Taylor (482205), Royal Regiment of Artillery.
- Major Peter David Wyamar Vaughan, TD, (410800), Corps of Royal Engineers (Territorial and Army Volunteer Reserve).
- Major (Director of Music) Harold William Vince (474509), 5th Royal Inniskilling Dragoon Guards, now Retired.
- 22326179 Warrant Officer Class II William Charles George Wall, Royal Corps of Signals.
- Major Robert William Ward (443583), 1st The Queen's Dragoon Guards.
- Major David Angus Wighton (422854), Royal Regiment of Artillery (Territorial and Army Volunteer Reserve).
- Lieutenant-Colonel (Acting) (N.M.) Kenneth Wilson (463742), Royal Army Medical Corps.
- Major William John Neville Wood (424144), Corps of Royal Military Police.

Royal Air Force

- Squadron Leader Stanley Arnold (197514), Royal Air Force Regiment.
- Squadron Leader Victor Caradoc Arthur (49342).
- Squadron Leader Reginald Harry Crumpton (4083101).
- Squadron Leader Edward Philip Folland (503723).
- Squadron Leader Ian Hall (4230255).
- Squadron Leader John Hartley (572117).
- Squadron Leader Alan Guy Cunningham-Hill (503493).
- Squadron Leader Douglas Hopton (949221), OBE.
- Squadron Leader John Vernon Lobley (4230153).
- Squadron Leader John Henry Procter (506464).
- Squadron Leader Douglas William Samuel (569286).
- Squadron Leader Graham Adrian Smart (3519697).
- Squadron Leader John Victor Taylor (1624472).
- Squadron Leader Robert Michael Turner (4230307).
- Squadron Leader Francis Walter Lyle White, (506086).
- Squadron Leader Dmitri Victorovitch Zotov (608125).
- Acting Squadron-Leader William Prentice (201746), Royal Air Force Volunteer Reserve (Training Branch).
- Flight Lieutenant Derek Anthony John Bell (1895056).
- Flight Lieutenant Barrie Epwell Lear Browning (3059647).
- Flight Lieutenant Bryan Allan Hayward (1922028).
- Flight Lieutenant Arthur Edward Horn (1920535).
- Flight Lieutenant Alec Raymond Tearle (4025695).
- Flight Lieutenant Owen John Thomas, AFC, (523514).
- Flight Lieutenant George Edward White (588044).
- Flight Lieutenant Thomas Winchcombe (579459).
- Flight Lieutenant Roger Arthur Wood (4335280).
- Warrant Officer Henry Ralph Broadhurst (E1147225).
- Warrant Officer James Durkin (B4032264).
- Warrant Officer Lockett Thompstone Evans (S0550020).

Civil Division

- Hubert Norman Abernethy. For political services in the East of England.
- Norman Acaster, Honorary Treasurer, Tonbridge Urban District and Rural District Local Savings Committee.
- William Birss Aitken, lately General Manager, Edinburgh Savings Bank.
- Amelia Lawrence Albert, Senior Information Officer, Department of Health and Social Security.
- John Vivian Alexander, lately Warden, The Mary Ward Centre.
- William John Alexander, Accounts Clerk, Carter Jonas, Crown Estate Receivers.
- Ellen Elizabeth Anderson, Interpreter, Able Language Services Ltd.
- Thomas Sheppard Angrave. For political services in Wessex.
- Cyril Wilfred Reginald Armitage, Professional and Technology Officer Grade II, Royal Mint.
- Jack Roy Armstrong, Research Director, Weald and Downland Open Air Museum.
- Mary Olive Arnott. For political and public services in Fife.
- Margaret Lindsay Arthur, lately Teacher-in-Charge, Philipshill Hospital School, Busby, Clarkston.
- Sarah Elizabeth Attwell, Honorary Secretary, Belfast Savings Group Secretaries Committee for Industry.
- Douglas Bagley, lately National Savings Liaison Officer, East Midlands Electricity Board.
- Kate Bagley, Health Visitor, Midhurst, Sussex.
- Walter Frank Bailey, Professional and Technology Officer Grade I, Department of the Environment.
- Ernest James Baker, lately Site Agent, W. E. Chivers & Sons Ltd.
- William Henry Banks, Consultant, Research Association for the Paper and Board, Printing and Packaging Industries.
- Henry Barker, Manager, Fabrication Departments, Manufacturing Division, Vickers Shipbuilding Group Ltd.
- William Charles Barker, formerly Higher Executive Officer, Royal Aircraft Establishment, Ministry of Defence.
- Victor Richard Barrett, Tax Officer (Higher Grade), Board of Inland Revenue.
- William Leslie Beavington, Personnel Relations Manager, Weybridge Division, British Aircraft Corporation Ltd. For services to Export.
- Lilian Margarette Beisiegel, Director, Periodicals Department, British Council.
- David Bell. For services to the disabled.
- Marjorie Anderson Bellamy. For services to the community in Grantham and Kesteven.
- William Norris Bentley. For political and public services in Lancashire.
- Robert Marston Beresford, Surveyor, Chief Grade, Ordnance Survey.
- John Wright Spears Beswick. For services to physical education in Shropshire.
- Irene Inga Betts. For services to Ecclesiastical Embroidery.
- Leslie Bichener, Ground Operations Superintendent, British European Airways.
- George Binks, Clerical Officer, Board of Customs and Excise.
- Mary Ellen Birchall. For services to the community in Wigan and district.
- Jean Marjorie Black, Grade 3 Officer, Department of Employment.
- John Blackledge, lately Director of Finance, The Textile Council.
- Dorothy Blundy, Clinical Nurse Teacher, The Ivy Lang School of Nursing, Crawley.
- Walter George Bowen, lately Secretary, Royal Seamen's Pension Fund.
- William Reginald Bowness, lately Chairman, Northern District Committee, Nottinghamshire Agricultural Executive Committee.
- Eunice Mary Rita Boyce, lately Medical Ward Sister, Southampton Children's Hospital.
- Richard Patrick James Seymour Boyce, BEM, Secretary, Old Comrades Association of the Royal Irish Regiment.
- Thomas John Bradshaw. For services to agriculture in Buckinghamshire.
- Roy Brewis, Contracts Manager, Armament Division, Vickers Ltd., Newcastle upon Tyne.
- Mary Elizabeth Bridgland, Deputy Chief Executive Officer, Distressed Gentlefolk's Aid Association.
- Hugh Marriner Brigg. For political services in Wales.
- Betty Owens Britton, Senior Personnel Officer, John Player & Sons, Nottingham.
- Harriet Mary Brockhurst, President and Chairman, Devon Association of Parish Councils.
- Wilfred Murgatroyd Brook, Housing and Estates Manager, Cardiff City Council.
- Clarice Hilda Brooksbank. For services to Music in Harrow.
- Arthur William Broomfield, Senior Development Engineer, Marine Gas Turbines Department, Rolls-Royce (1971) Ltd.
- Mollie Patricia Brown. For services to the disabled in Thames Ditton, Surrey.
- Carol Kathleen Bryant. For services to Paraplegic Sport.
- Norman Hughes Buckley. For services to Motor-boat racing.
- Frank Marshall Bucknall, Chief Inspector of Weights and Measures, County Borough of Grimsby.
- Arthur Raymond Bunce, Chief Project Engineer, British Ropeway Engineering Company Ltd. For services to Export.
- William George Burnett, Office Manager, Commonwealth Producers' Organisation.
- George Vincent Burns, lately Assistant Secretary, Institution of Civil Engineers.
- Benjamin George Butcher, Overseas Exhibitions Executive, Russells (Paddington) Ltd. For services to Export.
- Thea Byles, Headmistress, Chapel Road School, Attleborough, Norfolk.
- Reginald Stanley Cadman, Professional and Technology Officer Grade I, Ministry of Defence.
- Robert Cameron, Engineer-in-Charge, (Northern Ireland), Independent Television Authority.
- William Campbell, Fishing Boat Skipper, Elgin.
- Evelyn Margaret Candler, Matron, Convalescent Home for South Wales Mining Industry, Bournemouth.
- Elizabeth Carrick, Staff Tutor in Literature. Department of Adult Education, University of Newcastle upon Tyne.
- William Henry Carroll, Production Manager, British Rail Engineering Ltd.
- Ethel Eleanor Beatrice Chipchase, Secretary, Women's Advisory Committee, Trades Union Congress.
- Edith Margery, Lady Clark. For services to overseas students in London.
- Henry George Clark. For services to the Royal British Legion.
- May Agnes Clarke, Headmistress, Poole's Park Infants School, London.
- James Clubb. For services to charity.
- Robert McIntosh Clyde, General Manager, Cairngorm Chairlift, Aviemore.
- Thomas Charles Coe, Manager, Machine and Fittings Shops, Butterley Engineering Company Ltd., Derby.
- Christopher Herbert Collins, Senior Technical Officer, Public Health Laboratory Service.
- The Reverend Richard John Connell, General Secretary, Methodist Homes for the Aged.
- Eileen Patricia Connolly, Senior Executive Officer, Metropolitan Police Office.
- Charles George Cottey. For services to the community in Great Baddow, Essex.
- Mary Winifred Agnes Courtney. For services to the community in Bristol.
- Joy Cozens. For services to the community in Cheltenham.
- Gladys Agnes Craig, Principal Assistant (Secretarial Services) South of Scotland Electricity Board.
- Barbara Gladys Cruickshank, Deputy County Organiser, Leicestershire, Women's Royal Voluntary Service.
- John Bryon Cruse, TD, Chairman, Barnstaple, Bideford and District Disablement Advisory Committee.
- Mary Cullen, Deputy Assistant Registrar and Clerk of the Lists, Supreme Court of Judicature of Northern Ireland.
- Winifred Barbara Cumine, Superintendent of Typists, Home Office.
- Brenda Davies, Head of Information Department, National Film Archive.
- Emrys Davies, General Manager, Clynderwen and District Farmers Association Ltd., Pembrokeshire.
- Ernest Leslie Davies, Higher Executive Officer, Department for National Savings.
- Joan Florence Mary Davis, Chairman, South East Glamorgan War Pensions Committee.
- Alexander Ewing Crawford Denovan, lately Higher Scientific Officer, Ministry of Defence.
- Arthur William Edmund Dethan, Principal, Trustee Savings Banks College.
- Cecil Dinsdale, Regional Metallurgist, Eastern Region, British Railways Board.
- Robert Biggs Domony, lately Chairman, Dalton-in-Furness Road and Home Safety Committee.
- Robert Alexander Donaldson, Staff Reporter, Yorkshire Post.
- Margaret Alice Down, lately Manageress, Methodist Soldiers' Home, Blackdowh, Surrey.
- Harry Dros, MC, General Manager, J. Meredith-Jones & Sons, Cambrian Leather Works. For services to Export.
- William George Dunkley, Section Officer, Royal Naval Auxiliary Service.
- James Greig Dyer, General Medical Practitioner, Grangemouth, Stirlingshire.
- William Janies Michael Eastwood, Export Manager, C. Shippam Ltd. For services to Export.
- William Somerville Edgar. For services to the Boys' Brigade in Newtownards, County Down.
- David Geoffrey Edwards, Town Clerk, Colwyn Bay Borough Council.
- Frederick Goldfield Elliott, Chief Administration Officer, Town Clerk's Department, Burnley.
- Harry Juby Emery, Executive Officer, Ministry of Defence.
- Mary Endacott, Records Officer, Arts Council of Great Britain.
- Idris Evans, Wages Clerk, Brymbo Works, Special Steels Division, British Steel Corporation.
- The Reverend William Everett Evans, lately Free Church Hospital Chaplain, Epsom.
- Edward Henry Farnsworth, Chairman, North Durham Supplementary Benefit Appeal Tribunal.
- Kathleen Ferguson, Chairman, North East Children's Society.
- Thomas Field, lately Honorary Secretary, South Western Branch, Institution of Highway Engineers.
- Marion Jean Findlater, Higher Executive Officer, Ministry of Defence.
- Reginald Henry Firkins, Professional and Technology Officer Grade I, Department of the Environment.
- Edward Fitzpatrick, Manager, Sheffield Branch, Pickfords Heavy Haulage Ltd.
- Rachel Heyhoe Flint. For services to Women's Cricket.
- Newton John Forrest, Chief Safety Officer, George Wimpey & Company Ltd.
- Joseph Roger Forsyth, Manager, Halewood Transmission Plant, Ford Motor Company.
- Jack Forton, Area Manager, Refuse Disposal Branch, Public Health Engineering Department, Greater London Council.
- Anthony Francis Fox, ERD, Executive Geologist, British Petroleum Company Ltd.
- John William Fox, Establishment Officer, Merseyside Passenger Transport Executive.
- James Frame, Works Manager, North East Coast Shiprepairers Ltd., South Shields.
- Daniel Thomas Gethin, Chief Office Assistant, House of Lords.
- James Simpson Gibson, Sanitary Inspector and Master of Works, East Lothian County Council.
- Kenneth Gilbert. For services to rural industries in Northern Ireland.
- Agnes Barbara Goodall, Principal Medical Social Worker, Halifax Area Hospitals Management Committee.
- William Thomas Goosey, Chief Superintendent, Lincolnshire Constabulary.
- Doris Sarah Helen Graney, Higher Executive Officer, Department of Health and Social Security.
- Leslie Gordon Greatbatch, Chairman, West Bromwich Savings Committee.
- Albert Green, General Superintendent (Despatch & Car Assembly Belt), British Leyland (Austin/Morris) Ltd., Longbridge. For services to Export.
- Lucy Esme Green, Librarian, Education and Youth Department, Nottinghamshire Library.
- Clifford Howell Griffiths, Chairman, Newport Savings Committee, Monmouthshire.
- Ronald John Collins Hagley, Chief Superintendent, Surrey Constabulary.
- Hubert Charles Thomas Hailes, Chief Administrative Officer, Roads and Bridges Department, Dorset County Council.
- Douglas Alfred Hall, Regional Chief Scientist, North East Region, National Coal Board.
- Percy Desborough Hallam, DFC, Professional Officer (C), Department of Planning and Transportation, Greater London Council.
- Hugh Handley. For services to the community in Westmorland.
- Fred Hardman. For political and public services in the Midlands.
- Leslie Hartley, lately Secretary, Sailors' Children's Society, Hull.
- Edith Jessie Hawkin. For services to the community in Liverpool.
- Ronald Philip Hawkins, Senior Executive Officer, Board of Inland Revenue.
- Leonard Heap, Clerk to Bradford National Health Service Executive Council.
- Arthur Clarke Hendley, Assistant Distribution Engineer, East Midlands Gas Board.
- Eileen Henshall, Member, Sandbach Urban District Council, Cheshire.
- Frederick Heppenstall, General Works Manager, Immingham Works, Fisons Ltd.
- Harry Edmed Hewett, Senior Executive Officer, Lord Chancellor's Department.
- Lilian May Hewitt, lately Theatre Superintendent, Isle of Thanet District Hospitals.
- Leslie Hewkin, lately Member, Lake District Planning Board.
- Mary Anne Hickie, lately Matron, Hungerford Hospital, Berkshire.
- William Paton Highet, Chief Clerk of Works and Progress Officer, Cumbernauld Development Corporation.
- Joseph Hill. For political services in the East of England.
- Annie Evelyn Hinton. For services to the elderly in Wallasey.
- Irven Hobbs, Head of Art Department, Colmers Farm Secondary School, Birmingham.
- Cicely Elizabeth Hobkirk. For services to the community in Maiden and Coombe, Surrey.
- Robert Frederick Hobson. For services to the community in Moy, County Tyrone.
- Margaret Alice Hodge, Secretary, Wandsworth and Battersea Branch, National Society for the Prevention of Cruelty to Children.
- Katheleen Mary Holt, Member, North West Regional Sports Council.
- John Herbert Horry. For services to Squash Rackets.
- Harry Howarth, Professional and Technology Officer, Grade I, Department of the Environment.
- Harry Hughes, Observer Lieutenant, Royal Observer Corps.
- Arthur Horace Sydney Hull. For political and public services in London.
- Margaret Hunter, Personal Assistant, Washington, HM Treasury.
- William Johnstone Hunter, Commander, Metropolitan Police.
- Margaret Maureen Hurst, lately Head of Science Department, La Retraite High School, Bristol.
- Alfred Huyton, Factory Manager, Lucas Aerospace Ltd.
- Robert James St. Quintin Insull, Works Manager, Experimental Manufacture, Derby Engine Division, Rolls-Royce (1971) Ltd.
- Philip Ip Wan Tsung, Executive Officer, Ministry of Defence.
- Alfred Ralph Jarvis, Chief Superintendent, Metropolitan Police.
- Wilfred Joshua Jay. For political services in London.
- George Eric Jenkins, Assistant Clerk, Pembrokeshire County Council.
- Clement Armine Jennings, Senior Administrative Assistant, East Suffolk County Council.
- Christabel Frances Jeram, lately Higher Executive Officer, United Kingdom Atomic Energy Authority, Harwell.
- Leslie William Johnston, Divisional Officer, Belfast Fire Brigade.
- Leonard Robert Jolly, Exhibitions Secretary, Society of British Aerospace Companies. For services to Export.
- Betty Eileen Jones, Higher Executive Officer, Ministry of Defence.
- Henry Evans Jones, Chairman, North West Wales Disablement Advisory Committee.
- Leslie Edward James Jones, Foreign and Commonwealth Office.
- William John McKanan-Jones, Member, Highworth Rural District Council, Wiltshire.
- Lewis Judge, Children's Supervisor, Valence Special School, Westerham.
- Beryl Kampe. For services to the elderly in Hertfordshire.
- Colonel Waclaw Karpinski, President, Birkenhead Unit, Sea Cadet Corps.
- Arthur Henry Keates, Group Secretary, University Hospital Management Committee of South Manchester.
- Ruby Florence Kebble, Higher Executive Officer, Lord Chancellor's Department.
- Olive May Keirle, Principal Nursing Officer, Air Corporations Joint Medical Service.
- Ida Maud Kenworthy. For political services in the Midlands.
- Joseph Kenyon, Senior Nursing Officer and Superintendent, Princess Christian's Hospital, Hildenborough, Kent.
- William Percival Kidd, lately Journalist, Leicester Mercury.
- Muriel Joyce Kinchington, Senior Executive Officer, Foreign and Commonwealth Office (Overseas Development Administration).
- Cicely Kingdon, District Nurse, Midwife and Health Visitor, Callington, Cornwall.
- James Michael Kirkness, RD, Export Manager, Association of the British Pharmaceutical Industry. For services to Export.
- George Edward Valentine Lambert, Higher Scientific Officer, National Physical Laboratory, Department of Trade and Industry.
- James Leslie Lane, Higher Executive Officer, Department of Health and Social Security.
- Florence May Laws, Member, South East Northumberland Local Employment Committee and Disablement Advisory Committee.
- Dorothy Maud Leacey. For services to nursing and to the British Red Cross Society in Gloucester.
- Ruth Lee, lately Honorary Secretary, Winterton Hospital League of Friends, Co. Durham.
- Austin Leslie Leggett, Higher Executive Officer, Ministry of Defence.
- Captain Frank David Lloyd, Master Mariner, Sir R. Ropner & Company Ltd.
- Arthur Long, QPM, Deputy Chief Constable, Suffolk Constabulary.
- The Reverend Canon John Charles Longbottom, Chairman, Warrington and District Trustee Savings Bank.
- Michael McAtamney, Chief Superintendent, Royal Ulster Constabulary.
- Margaret McAteer, lately Midwifery Sister, Bellshill Maternity Hospital.
- William James McBride. For services to Rugby Football.
- James Leslie McCullough, Building Contractor, Newry, County Down.
- Alexander McDonald, Headmaster, Chilton School, Maghull, Liverpool.
- Archibald Thomas McKechnie, Inspector (Higher Grade), Board of Inland Revenue.
- James Lumsden McKenzie. For services to Highland Dancing.
- Alfred James Macklin, Senior Executive Officer, Department of Health and Social Security.
- Andrew Macklin, Chief Officer, Stockport Fire Brigade.
- Daphne May Maclean. For political services in the London area.
- Ronald Macmillan, TD, Ophthalmic Optician, Aberdeen.
- Esther Mahijr, Senior Executive Officer, Department of Education and Science.
- Victor George Maitland, Grade 4 Officer, Department of Employment.
- Edwin Hugh Markham. For services to the Scout Association in Essex.
- Audrey Catherine Martin, Higher Executive Officer, Laboratory of Molecular Biology, Medical Research Council.
- Mary Bryson Martin, Navy, Army and Air Force Institutes Club Supervisor, Airmen's Social Club, RAF Lyneham, Wiltshire.
- Thomas William James Mather, Senior Probation Officer, Warwickshire Probation and After-Care Service.
- Harry Mayor, Regional Auditor, Northern Ireland, Ministry of Agriculture, Fisheries and Food.
- Doris Mandeville Mead, Senior Occupational Therapist, Napsbury Hospital, Hertfordshire.
- Joyce May Meekins, Head of Children's Welfare Department, London, Women's Royal Voluntary Service.
- The Reverend James Wilkie Meiklejohn. For services to The Scripture Union in Scotland.
- Kathleen Merritt. For services to the Southern Orchestral Concert Society.
- John Edward Micklewright, Senior Executive Officer, Department of Health and Social Security.
- George Robert Milne, Deputy Regional Director, Glasgow and West of Scotland Blood Transfusion Service.
- Dennis Clifford Mitchell, Divisional Officer Grade II, Glamorgan Fire Brigade.
- Henry George Mitchell, General Manager, Land Settlement Association Ltd. (Horley, Surrey).
- Jean Mitchell, Executive Officer, Department of Health and Social Security.
- John Gwilym Molyneux. For services to the community in Cumberland.
- Patrick Monaghan, Honorary Treasurer/Secretary, No. 107 (Aberdeen) Squadron Committee, Air Training Corps.
- Robert Montgomery, Professional and Technology Officer Grade I, Scottish Home and Health Department.
- Eric Carol Moore, Works Manager, Diesel Engine Components Division, Associated Engineering Ltd., Bridgwater. For services to Export.
- Leslie Ernest Moreby, General Secretary, Birmingham Federation of Boys' Clubs.
- Joan Wilfredene Lavinia Morgan, Executive Officer, Welsh Office.
- Arthur Morley, Senior Accident Claims Officer, Metropolitan Police Office.
- Major Walter Mortimer, TD, Stores Officer, Lowlands of Scotland, Territorial, Auxiliary and Volunteer Reserve Association.
- William Leonard Moss, Higher Scientific Officer, Institute for Research on Animal Diseases, Compton, Agricultural Research Council.
- William MacDonald-Murray, lately Higher Executive Officer, Director of, Public Prosecutions Department.
- Charles Cooper Naan, Chief Superintendent, Mid-Anglia Constabulary.
- Frank Barrass Naylor, lately Warden, Maes yr Haf Education Settlement, Rhondda, Glamorgan.
- Eric John Nichols, Group Building Supervisor, Clwyd and Deeside Hospital Management Committee.
- Dorothy Sylvia Norman, ARRC, Chief Nursing Officer, Bath City Council.
- Kathleen Alma Northcott, Superintendent of County Council Children's Home, Vyvyan House, Helston, Cornwall.
- Humphrey Nowill. For services to the Abbeydale Industrial Hamlet.
- Cyril Nuttall, Member, Blackpool and Fylde Hospital Management Committee.
- Brigid Maeve O'Donovan, Head of Establishments, Council of Industrial Design.
- David Gerard O'Keefe, Headmaster, St. Saviour's Secondary School, Bellshill, Lanarkshire.
- William James Oram. For political services in Wessex.
- Florence Barbara Jenny Osborn, Foreign and Commonwealth Office.
- Doris Ellen Paddon, Director of Nursing Services, Chester County Borough.
- Ethel Agnes Page, Housing Officer, Royal Air Force Benevolent Fund.
- Robert Hector Claude Papworth, Regional Manager, South America, Thomas De La Rue & Company Ltd.
- Thomas Park, Chief Housing Inspector, Ministry of Development for Northern Ireland.
- Sybil Edith Emily Parsons, Higher Executive Officer, Department of the Environment.
- John Pate, Principal Administrative Officer, Lanarkshire County Council.
- James Paterson, Executive Officer, Board of Customs and Excise.
- Bernard Payne, lately Organist, HM Prison, Birmingham.
- Mervyn Street Payne. For services to the Magistracy in Norfolk.
- Ernest Peet, Supervisor of Caretaking Services, West Riding of Yorkshire Education Authority.
- Gerald Crosland Pengilly, Mine Manager, South Crofty Ltd.
- Phyllis Beryl Perchard, Honorary Treasurer, First Tower School Savings Bank, Jersey.
- Bernard Lloyd Ashburn Pester, Clerical Officer, Ministry of Defence.
- Walter Thomas Peters, lately Manager, Space Projects, British Hovercraft Corporation Ltd.
- Winifred Sarah Peters, Joint County Borough Organiser, Warley, Women's Royal Voluntary Service.
- Arthur Henry Phipps, Secretary, Bureau of Hygiene and Tropical Diseases.
- Gwendoline Marguerite Pierce, lately Sister, North Cambridgeshire Hospital, Wisbech.
- Lydia Doreen Mary Pike, Chief Clerk, Plymouth Fire Brigade.
- Henry Edward Melville Poole, Foreign and Commonwealth Office.
- Edmund Francis Potter, Assistant Secretary, Institution of Mechanical Engineers.
- Eric George Quested. For services to dairy farming and milk marketing.
- John McDougall Rae, Higher Executive Officer, Board of Inland Revenue.
- Flora Nicolson Reid, Head Teacher, Kyleakin Primary School, Skye.
- Ernest Lawrence Rhoden, Headmaster, Grove Junior School, Wolverhampton.
- Kenneth John Rhodes, Senior Executive Officer, HM Stationery Office.
- Drusilla Maygone Richards, Honorary Secretary, Merthyr Vale and Treharris Divisions, Glamorgan, Soldiers' Sailors' and Airmen's Families Association.
- Henry Albert Roberts, lately Regional Marketing Officer, British Waterways Board.
- Margaret Roberts, Higher Executive Officer, Ministry of Defence.
- Rachel Elisabeth Roberts, Member of Consumers' Committees for Great Britain and for England and Wales.
- Alexander Thomas Parke Robertson. For services to Music.
- William Robson, Clerical Officer, Ministry of Agriculture, Fisheries and Food.
- Albert James Rodwell. For services to the Brewing Industry and to Export.
- Eric Newton Sainter, Secretary, North Western Road Car Company Ltd. and Omnibus Stations Ltd.
- Robert Schueller, Senior Executive Officer, Office of Population Censuses and Surveys.
- Richard Johnson Sefton, Assistant Divisional Officer, Belfast Fire Brigade.
- Ernest Barber Seymour, Export Manager, Beatson, Clark & Company Ltd. For services to Export.
- Thomas Charles Frederick Sharman, lately Assistant Secretary, The Boys' Brigade.
- Frederick William Shearman, Executive Officer, Ministry of Defence.
- Anthony Ashley Shipton, TD, Joint Managing Director, Ward Lock Ltd.
- Ernest John Simmonds, Professional and Technology Officer, Grade I, Ministry of Defence.
- Kathleen Beck-Slinn, lately Senior Scientific Officer, Torry Research Station, Department of Trade and Industry.
- Jan Adam Sliwa, Head of Research and Development Unit, Architect's Department, Oxford Regional Hospital Board.
- Leonard Smalley, Member, Kenilworth Urban District Council, Warwickshire.
- Stanley William Smith, Executive Engineer, London Telecommunications Region, Post Office.
- Amelia Haslam Sowrey. For political services in Edinburgh.
- Reginald Graham Nigel Spears, Chief Superintendent, Royal Ulster Constabulary.
- Alexander Speirs, Senior Executive Officer, Department of Health and Social Security.
- Florence Ellen Spencer, Secretary, Western Regional Association for the Blind.
- George William Spofforth, Inspector (Higher Grade), Board of Inland Revenue.
- Margaret Peel Spriggs, Centre Organiser, Altrincham, Women's Royal Voluntary Service.
- Wilfred Edgar Stanton, Technical Director, Metallisation Ltd.
- Leslie Eric Starnes, Senior Engineer, Design Office, Sir Owen Williams & Partners.
- Ethel Beatrice Stephens, Principal Nursing Officer, Dudley Road Hospital, Birmingham.
- Roderick Alan Stephenson, lately Assistant Engineer-in-Chief (Research & Development), Mersey Docks & Harbour Company.
- John Donne Stevens, Mess Manager, Central Flying School, Ministry of Defence.
- George Chrystal Stevenson, Member, Visiting Committee, HM Borstal Institution, Castle Huntly.
- Hans Stevenson, Head Postmaster, Newry, County Down.
- James Cochrane Stevenson, Administrative Secretary, Northern Ireland Council of Social Service.
- James Paul Stewart, Honorary Surgeon, Glasgow, St. Andrew's Ambulance Association.
- Sarah Ann Stewart, lately Midwifery Sister, Grantham and Kesteven General Hospital.
- Harold Styan. For services to youth in Harrogate.
- Arthur Joseph Sudbery, Executive Engineer, London Telecommunications Region, Centre Telephone Area, Post Office.
- John Gordon Sutter, Field Maintenance Engineer (Transmission), Electricity Board for Northern Ireland.
- Arthur Ronald Taffs, Public Relations Officer and Road Safety Organiser, London Borough of Lewisham.
- Brenda Tetlow. For political and public services in the Midlands.
- Major Edwin Leslie Thomas, TD, Member, National Savings Committee for Scotland.
- Jack Reymond Thomas, lately Senior Executive Officer, Department of Trade and Industry.
- Richard Thompson. For services to youth in Middlesbrough.
- Thomas Henry Thornton, Domestic Marketing Manager, Eastern Gas Board.
- Edward Ernest Tilbury, Foreign and Commonwealth Office.
- Dorothy Lilian Tilleard, Consultant, Research Association of British Paint, Colour and Varnish Manufacturers.
- Fred Tomlinson, Conductor, Rossendale Male Voice Choir.
- Nellie Margaret Tripp, Chairman, Lewes Division, Hellingly Hospital League of Friends.
- John Patrick Turley, Managing Director and Secretary, Industrial Therapy Organisation and Housing Association.
- Catherine Turner, Ward Sister, Middlewood Hospital, Sheffield.
- Anthony John Uren, Chief Warning Officer, Coventry Group, United Kingdom Warning and Monitoring Organisation.
- Ann Urquhart, Member, Ross and Cromarty County Council.
- Gordon Ernest Vale, District Officer, Housing Department, Greater London Council.
- Francis Ernest Paul Vaughan, Deputy Supply and Transport Officer, Ministry of Defence.
- Madeline Ethel Wadsworth, County Borough Organiser, Bolton, Women's Royal Voluntary Service.
- Francis Walker, Assistant Executive Engineer, Post Office, Northern Ireland.
- George Walker, General Works Manager, Preston Division, British Aircraft Corporation Ltd. For services to Export.
- John Chisholm Ward, Chairman and Secretary, General Aviation Safety Committee.
- Doris Vera Webber, Deputy Head Teacher, Tiber Street County Primary School, Liverpool.
- John William West, County Youth Officer, Cornwall.
- Frances Marian Whiteford, Valuation Clerk (Higher Grade), Board of Inland Revenue.
- Eric James Wigmore, Administrative Officer, Secretary's Department, Headquarters, Central Electricity Generating Board.
- Muriel Josephine Wilkins, Superintendent Physiotherapist Grade I, Ministry of Defence.
- George Hampton Wilkinson, lately Outside Erection Manager, Armament Division, Vickers (Engineers) Ltd.
- Francis James Williams, Grade 3 Officer, Department of Employment.
- Liam Augustine Williams, Administrator, St. Martin of Tours House, London.
- Thomas Edward Williams, Inspector, HM Coastguard, Department of Trade and Industry.
- John Charles Williamson, lately Manager, Lord Roberts' Workshops, Bristol.
- Daniel Leitch Wilson, Secretary, Scottish Police Federation.
- Marjorie Longworth Woodford. For services to Anglo-American Community Relations in Upper Heyford, Oxfordshire.
- Stanley Woodhouse, lately Honorary Treasurer, Slough Deaf Centre.
- Douglas Robert Woodman, BEM, Chief Administrative Officer, West Yorkshire Constabulary.
- Douglas Henry Woods, Superintendent of Building and Plant, Parsons Peebles Ltd., Edinburgh.
- Bertram Wood Woolley, Lecturer, Teesside College of Education.
- Edward Donald Wynn, Chairman and Managing Director, Wynstruments Ltd. For services to Export.
- Emily Florence Yates, County Secretary, Surrey, National Federation of Women's Institutes.

Diplomatic Service and Overseas List

- Captain Arthur Edward Adey. For services to electrical engineering in St. Lucia.
- Pauline Elizabeth Allan, lately Grade 9 Officer, HM Embassy, Bonn.
- Harold Baker, Chief Superintendent, Malawi Police Force.
- William Gerald Calthrop Bearcroft, lately Research Officer, West Africa Medical Research Council.
- Nora Hunter Bell. For charitable and welfare services in Nigeria.
- Edith Mary Alice Burge. For nursing and welfare services in El Salvador.
- Ian William Derek Buxton, lately Director of Audit, Uganda.
- Edith Margaret Callam, Personal Assistant to HM Ambassador, Brasilia.
- The Reverend Reuben Edward Cooper. For services to education and to the community in the Bahama Islands.
- Gideon John Cordice, Medical Officer of Health and Medical Superintendent of the Mental Hospital, St. Vincent.
- Joseph Charles Cortes. For services to the Scout movement in Gibraltar.
- Julia de Cooman, Commercial Officer Grade II, HM Embassy, Brussels.
- Zorick Shahen Delanian, Senior Consular Clerk, HM Embassy, Tehran.
- James Esperdiao de Souza, Chief Accountant, Treasury Department, Uganda.
- Dorothy Mary Elchlepp. For services to the British community in Stuttgart.
- Lois Leonara Ellis, Machine Room Supervisor, Ministry of Finance, Bahama Islands.
- Roger Lewis Flanagan, British Vice-Consul, Nice.
- Frederick Shirley Furbert. For services to education in Bermuda.
- Patricia Gale, lately Personal Assistant to HM Ambassador, Moscow.
- Edwina Aileen Garrett. For charitable and welfare services in Rio de Janeiro.
- Beatrice Ray Griffiths, British Vice-Consul, Cairo.
- Henry Arthur Harbottle, Chief Government Chemist, Ministry of Internal Affairs, Uganda.
- Miriam Haynes, lately Shorthand-typist, HM Embassy, Vientiane.
- David Michael Hogan, Senior Superintendent, Royal Swaziland Police Force.
- Ronald Sydney Howe, Second Secretary (Commercial), British High Commission, Blantyre.
- Evadne Marie Hulse, JP. For services to the community in British Honduras.
- Charles Thomas Humphrey, Senior Commercial Officer, HM Embassy, Madrid.
- Robert Nicholas Jack, Finance Clerk, British Development Division in the Caribbean, Bridgetown.
- Geoffrey George Lamacraft. For services to education in Bermuda.
- Lau Yuen-cheuk, Senior Education Officer, Hong Kong.
- Patricia Lighthill, Assistant British Council Representative, Yugoslavia.
- Ina Lucien Loving. For services to education in Antigua.
- Liu Fook-hong. For services to the community in Hong Kong.
- Mary McAuley. For services to education in Japan.
- John Desmond Maher, lately First Secretary and Consul, HM Embassy, Bangkok.
- Charles Noel Mann, Assistant Trade Commissioner, British Government Office, Montreal.
- Edward Gordon Markee, Second Secretary (Visa), HM Embassy, Paris.
- Charles Paul Guy Nicholson, British Vice-Consul (Commercial), Bilbao.
- Roriald George Osborn, First Secretary (Commercial), HM Embassy, Monrovia.
- Wyndham Gethin Owen, Senior Hydrologist, Water Development Department, Uganda.
- Reginald Oswald Palmer. For services to education in Grenada.
- Nicholas Miltiades Papangelis, British Vice-Consul and Commercial Attaché, Athens.
- Denis Harry Payne, Commercial Officer, HM Consulate-General, Atlanta.
- Stanley Vernon Procope. For services to the community in St. Christopher-Nevis-Anguilla.
- Peter Albert Raftery, First Secretary, HM Embassy, Bahrain.
- Wynifred Anne Ransome, Grade 9 Officer, British High Commission, New Delhi.
- The Reverend Lindsay Henry Robertson, Village Technologist, Department of Community Development, Malawi.
- Stanley Rob'Son. For services to the British community in Copenhagen.
- Joseph Paschal Russo, Accountant, Post Office and Savings Bank, Gibraltar.
- Christine Louise Scotson, Headmistress, British Embassy School, Budapest.
- Jeanne Taylor. For nursing and welfare services in Lesotho.
- Alison Mary Todd. For services to nursing and the community in the New Hebrides.
- Florence Alice Walker, British Pro-Consul, São Paulo.
- Ernest Peter Waring, DFC, Second Secretary, United Kingdom Delegation to the European Communities, Brussels.
- Jane Wilson. For services to the British Red Cross Society hi Botswana.
- Wong Ki-lim, Liaison Officer Class I, Secretariat for Home Affairs, Hong Kong.
- Stephen Wong Yuen-cheung. For services to the community in Hong Kong.
- Yue Kam-kau, Waterworks Inspector Class I, Public Works Department, Hong Kong.

Australian States

State of New South Wales

- Alexander Alexander. For services to the community.
- Cornelius Kennedy Asmussen. For services to surf life saving.
- George Alfred Edwards. For services to the community.
- Eleanor Margaret Fitzsimons. For services to the community.
- Peter Roynon Mitchell Jenkins. For services to education.
- Beverley Hunter Job. For services to the community.
- Francis Charles Laut. For services to Police welfare and to the community.
- Gwendoline Victoria McLaughlin. For services to the community.
- Councillor Bernard Anthony Mullane. For services to local government.
- William Robert Howard Naylor. For services to the Royal Over-Seas League, New South Wales Branch.
- Mildred Daphne Reece. For services to nursing.
- Elaine Beth Sheargold. For services to the community.
- Leonard Nelson Schultz. For services to the community.
- Hilda May Tinkler. For services to ex-servicemen and to the community.

State of Victoria

- Councillor Percy William Attree, JP, of Nariel. For services to the community.
- Dorothy Leighton Berry, JP, of Hawthorn. For services to politics.
- Arnold Roy Blashki, of Toorak. For services to ex-servicemen and women and to the Jewish community.
- Albert George Davis, JP, of Rosanna. For services to pharmacy and the community.
- Reginald Frank Hargreaves Dixon, MC, of Horsham. For services to the community.
- Alice Fletcher, JP, of Yarraville. For services to the community.
- Patricia Irene Garett, of Berwick, For services to journalism.
- John Claude Moseley Harper, MC, of Daylesford. For services to medicine and the community.
- Arthur Stanley Howard, of South Yarra. For services as an art collector.
- Benjamin John Hubbard, JP, of Ringwood. For services to the community.
- Councillor Herbert Aikman Keele, of Lockington. For services to the community.
- Councillor Thomas Henry King, of Armadale. For services to the community.
- Walter Lawton, of Langwarrin. For services to charity and to the community.
- John Gerrard Lyons, Director of Administration, Police Department.
- Cyril John Michelsen, of Bendigo. For services to journalism and the community.
- Gladys Christlieb Post, of East Bentleigh. For services to the community.
- Gordon William Rothacker, of Reservoir. For services to the sport of trotting.
- Brian Chadwick Seymour, of Mount Waverley. For services to youth.
- Janet Emily Schintler, of West Footscray. For services to the community.
- Councillor William Henry Sloper, of Mangalore. For services to the community.

State of Queensland

- Malcolm James Anderson, of Brisbane. For his contribution to lawn tennis.
- William James Seattle, of Calico Creek. For services to the vegetable growing industry.
- William Francis Brook, of Birdsville. For his contribution to local authority and public affairs in the outback.
- Frank Llewellyn Chadwick, of Brisbane. For services to motoring.
- Winifred Florence Mabel Davson, of Gatton. For services to the theatre, and cultural and community activities.
- Mary Myrtle Flower, of Roma. For services to the community.
- Clifford Wilton Lanham, of Tugun. For services in the field of aviation.
- Eric Edwin Winter, of Caboolture. For services to ex-servicemen.

State of Tasmania

- Nellie Winifred Brown, of New Town. For services to the community.
- (Sister) Laura May Fisher, of Oatlands. For services to nursing.
- Claude Wesley Stratton, Master Warden, Marine Board of Burnie.

=== Order of the Companions of Honour (CH) ===
- The Right Honourable Arnold Abraham, Baron Goodman. For public services.
- Herbert Norman Howells, CBE, Composer.
- John Egerton Christmas Piper, Painter.
- Reginald Jones Powell, Principal, Board of Customs and Excise.
- Ivor Francis Bassett Richards, Superintending Architect, Ministry of Finance for Northern Ireland.
- Arthur Lionel Smith, Principal Collector of Taxes, Board of Inland Revenue.
- Frank Maurice Wharram Smith, MBE, Executive Director, Ministry of Defence.
- Frank Solari, lately Assistant Director, Aircraft Equipment Production, Ministry of Defence.
- Derek John Swift, Superintending Engineer, Department of the Environment.
- Stanley Lewis Sheldon Thomas, Principal Scientific Officer, National Physical Laboratory, Department of Trade and Industry.
- Eric Kenneth Williams, Principal Scientific Officer, Royal Radar Establishment, Ministry of Defence.

Diplomatic Service and Overseas List

- Captain Gerard Maurice Clarke, MBE, Superintendent of Prisons, Dominica.
- Iu Kau-yu, Interpreter/Translator Class II, Criminal Investigation Department, Royal Hong Kong Police Force.
- David Nye Willis, Chief Information Officer, Hong Kong.

Australian States
State of Queensland

- Edward Kevin Emmett Healy, Under Secretary, Department of Mines.

=== Companion of the Imperial Service Order (ISO) ===
Home Civil Service

- Hannah Gwendolen Alston, HM Inspector, Department of Education and Science.
- Raymond Edgar Ball, Principal, Department of Health and Social Security.
- Harry Thornley Bowden, Chief Accountant, Public Trustee Office.
- Brian George Buckley, MBE, Principal, Civil Service Sports Council.
- George Francis Gartan, Senior Principal, Home Office.
- Leonard Sanders Horsham, Acting Constructor, Ministry of Defence.
- John William Johns, Principal Examiner, Patent Office.
- Reginald Kimsey Johns, Assistant Controller of Death Duties, Board of Inland Revenue.
- Harold Alphonse Johnson, Principal, Department of the Environment.
- John Richard Keyworth, Divisional Agricultural Officer, Ministry of Agriculture, Fisheries and Food.
- Hermann Leslie Maggs, Principal, Department of Trade and Industry.
- Albert John Middleton, Senior Assistant District Auditor, Department of the Environment.
- Mervyn Morris, Principal, Department for National Savings.

=== British Empire Medal (BEM) ===
Military Division

Royal Navy

- Colour Sergeant Eric Murray Exelby Alexander, PO/X 5796.
- Marine Engineering Artificer First Class (P.) Frank Appleford, V.994652.
- Chief Petty Officer (G.I.) Peter Dennis John Basher, P/J 581300.
- Colour Sergeant (C.A.) Harold Frank Crittenden Burt, CH/X 4633.
- Chief Petty Officer Writer Ronald Caine, P/MX 834392.
- Colour Sergeant Bugler George Joseph Castle, RM 8435.
- Chief Petty Officer Cook Tan Chau, O.1056.
- Chief Petty Officer Writer Dennis John Cooper, D/MX 670290.
- Regulating Petty Officer James Farmer, D/M 830607.
- Chief Petty Officer (Q.A.2) David John Gaden, P/JX 835847.
- Chief Radio Supervisor Norman Goddard, D/JX 213110.
- Chief Petty Officer (U.C.I) Kenneth Albert Hayes, P/JX 893130.
- Chief Petty Officer Cook Wai Yu Lo, O.2180.
- Chief Petty Officer (T.A.S.I.) Robert Cedric Loftus, JX 858227.
- Chief Petty Officer Medical Assistant Raymond Hori Mariner, P/MX 899041.
- Colour Sergeant George Miller, RM 11318.
- Chief Petty Officer Stores Accountant Leslie Philip Montague, P/MX 47524.
- Chief Petty Officer Stores Accountant David Hugh Morgan, P/MX 896782.
- Chief Air Fitter (O.) Edward Thomas Murphy, L/FX 519901.
- Chief Petty Officer Writer William Percy Northfield, MX 875864.
- Chief Ordnance Artificer John William O'Connor, Q 990908.
- Chief Ordnance Electrician Edwin James Osborne, P/M 759157.
- Chief Wren Margaret Pacheco, J/W 130.
- Head Naval Nurse Joan Reynolds, Queen Alexandra's Royal Naval Nursing Service, 0085.
- Chief Petty Officer (C.D.I) Francis Patrick Rose, D/JX 864915.
- Chief Petty Officer Steward Dennis George Stevens, P/LX 904332.
- Mr. Dennis Vance, DSM, Boatswain, Royal Fleet Auxiliary Service.
- Colour Sergeant Robert Williams, RM 18516.
- Ordnance Electrical Artificer First Class Thomas Yarrow, P/MX 704008.

Army

- 23613209 Staff Sergeant (Acting) Russell Weir Adey, Royal Corps of Signals.
- 23719738 Staff Sergeant Frank Agnew, Corps of Royal Electrical and Mechanical Engineers, Territorial and Army Volunteer Reserve.
- 22818913 Staff Sergeant (Acting) Roy Joseph Baldwin, Corps of Royal Military Police.
- 22736803 Staff Sergeant Joseph Edward Betteridge, Royal Corps of Transport.
- 23744392 Sergeant Peter Boulton, Royal Army Pay Corps.
- 23086970 Staff Sergeant (Provisional) Clive Desmond Bowler, Corps of Royal Engineers, Territorial and Army Volunteer Department.
- 23932226 Sergeant Edward John Cook, Royal Army Ordnance Corps.
- 21001463 Staff Sergeant (Local) Douglas Dawson, Royal Tank Regiment.
- 23735946 Sergeant Joseph William Fletcher, Royal Army Ordnance Corps.
- 22286359 Sergeant Joseph William Fisher, Royal Corps of Signals.
- 23785999 Staff Sergeant Thomas Gilmore, Royal Army Ordnance Corps.
- W/395393 Sergeant (Acting) Ursula Barbara Gregory, Women's Royal Army Corps.
- 22359963 Warrant Officer Class II (Acting) Terence James Harris, The Royal Regiment of Wales.
- 23836983 Sergeant (Acting) Richard John Bernard Harvey, Corps of Royal Engineers.
- 23212246 Staff Sergeant Peter Hill, Corps of Royal Military Police.
- 23533930 Sergeant Barry Ellis Ibbertson, Royal Corps of Signals.
- 21009025 Sergeant (Acting) Patrick Christopher Irwin, Irish Guards.
- 23677608 Sergeant John Lee Kennedy, Royal Corps of Transport.
- 23693616 Staff Sergeant James William Laybourne, Special Air Service Regiment, Territorial and Army Volunteer Reserve.
- 23683156 Staff Sergeant William Taylor Murray, 9th/12th Royal Lancers (Prince of Wales's).
- 22540867 Staff Sergeant Joseph Michael Reddick, The Parachute Regiment.
- 24092592 Corporal (Acting) David Allen Robb, Royal Army Ordnance Corps.
- 22526527 Sergeant (Acting) Ernest Claude Robertson, Royal Regiment of Artillery.
- 23496142 Staff Sergeant Gordon Thow Thomas Rose, Corps of Royal Military Police.
- 21005504 Sergeant Frederick Seth Small, Royal Corps of Signals.
- 23820536 Sergeant Mark Alan Spring, Royal Corps of Signals.
- 24018315 Sergeant Michael John Stretton, Royal Corps of Signals.
- 14856457 Warrant Officer Class II (Local) Ronald Thursfield, Royal Army Ordnance Corps.
- HK/18022796 Staff Sergeant Ting Yau Tse, Royal Corps of Transport.
- 23939408 Corporal Charles Rudi Victor Paul Vigo Di Gallidoro, Royal Corps of Transport.
- 11273210 Warrant Officer Class II (Local) Joseph Lewis Ward, Royal Army Pay Corps, Territorial and Army Volunteer Reserve.
- 22217268 Staff Sergeant Colin Clive Willetts, Welsh Guards.
- 22285125 Staff Sergeant (Acting) Austin Gordon Worthington, Corps of Royal Electrical and Mechanical Engineers.

Royal Air Force

- Acting Warrant Officer Brian Parkin (A4031374).
- R0585252 Flight Sergeant Antony Michael Browne.
- N4006215 Flight Sergeant Edward Buckley.
- F4174664 Flight Sergeant Dennis Victor Bunney.
- G4014562 Flight Servant James Sinkins Colbert.
- B1145802 Flight Sergeant Andrew Vincent Beverley Crawford.
- K3010666 Flight Sergeant Harold Edward Evans.
- NOS19472 Flight Sergeant Alan Fairclough.
- T3501122 Flight Sergeant Desmond Kennedy.
- K3S00424 Flight Sergeant Edward Martin Rogers.
- N057927S Flight Sergeant Roy Donald Smith.
- EO630S86 Flight Sergeant Ronald Harris Southwood.
- H4028189 Flight Sergeant Daniel John Thomas.
- W3062813 Flight Sergeant Charles Wilfred Tomes.
- S4169685 Acting Flight Sergeant Angus McCamish.
- WO626920 Acting Flight Sergeant John Henry Millar.
- K1922012 Acting Flight Sergeant John Michael Ridley.
- TO683560 Acting Flight Sergeant John Elwyn Tunnah.
- A4066060 Chief Technician John Brian Basting.
- MO589942 Chief Technician David George Dicker.
- X4140995 Chief Technician Thomas William Gore.
- WO527698 Chief Technician Perton Vivian Hatton.
- Q1922186 Chief Technician Peter Hughes.
- G1922127 Chief Technician Geoffrey Knut Malmstrom.
- VI430797 Chief Technician Richard Arthur Wood.
- B4256567 Sergeant David Brewin.
- P4112706 Sergeant John Edwin Jarrett.
- V4067573 Sergeant William Charles John.
- Y4235745 Sergeant Geoffrey James Osborne.
- R4247782 Sergeant Michael John Smith.
- T4151467 Corporal Thomas Paul Boyd.
- K1947185 Corporal Howard Leslie Instone.
- W4183587 Corporal John Donald Ross McRae.

Bar to the British Empire Medal (Military Division)

- T0538070 Flight Sergeant John Whitehead, BEM.

Civil Division

United Kingdom

- May Irene Adamson, Drawing Office Assistant, Aldermaston, United Kingdom Atomic Energy Authority.
- Clifford Addyman, Gas Fitter, Harrogate District, North Eastern Gas Board.
- John Hubert Edmond Allen, Squadron Warrant Officer, No. 342 (Ealing and Brentford) Squadron, Air Training Corps.
- George Daniel Anderson, Assistant Administrative Instructor, Kent Army Cadet Force.
- William Annandale, Senior Foreman, Ferranti Ltd., Edinburgh.
- Joseph Atkin, Head Porter, St. James's Hospital, Leeds.
- James Baird, Driver/Projectionist, Ulster Savings Committee.
- William Craig Barnett, Arm Training Instructor, Princess Margaret Rose Hospital, Edinburgh.
- Albert Frederick Beacall, Head Caretaker, South Cheshire Central College of Further Education, Crewe.
- Henry John Beese, Overman, Tymawr Colliery, East Wales Area, National Coal Board.
- William Bell, Training Officer, Rothwell Colliery, North Yorkshire Area, National Coal Board.
- Owen Leslie Bennett, Foreman Fitter, A. Monk & Company, Orton Longueville, Peterborough.
- Sidney William Bennett, Office Keeper, Royal Courts of Justice.
- Eric Arrowsmith Bennion, Foreman Fitter (Mechanical), Chester District, Merseyside and North Wales Electricity Board.
- George James Ernest Bird, Transport Inspecting Officer, London Fire Brigade.
- James Ferguson Black, Stock-keeper, Glengarnock Works, British Steel Corporation.
- Sydney Clements Black, lately Technical Grade II, Department of the Environment.
- Arthur Blizzard, Fitter, Vosper Thornycroft Ltd., Southampton Docks.
- Elsie Bradfield, Senior Section Leader, Interdepartmental Despatch Service, Department of the Environment.
- Helen Judith Brown, Group Leader, Kendal Members' Group, Westmorland Branch, British Red Cross Society.
- James Henry Brown, lately Chauffeur, British Transport Advertising Ltd.
- John Brown, Sergeant, Royal Ulster Constabulary.
- Fred Brunskill, lately Schoolkeeper, Inner London Education Authority, Education Equipment Centre, London S.E.11.
- Edna Bullock, Emergency Services Organiser, Sheffield County Borough, Women's Royal Voluntary Service.
- Nellie Milroy Campbell. For services to the welfare of the elderly in Swansea.
- Ernest Reginald Thomas Carter, Station Officer, Somerset Fire Brigade.
- Charles Chapman, Carpenter and Chargehand Foreman, G. & W. Waller Ltd., London S.W.18. For services to Export.
- Stanley Chapman, Driver, Killingholme Terminal, Shell-Mex & B.P. Ltd.
- Malcolm Horace Chase, Principal Photographer, Eastcote, Ministry of Defence.
- Harry Clark, Foreman, Test Engineers, Vickers Shipbuilding Group Ltd., Barrow-in-Furness.
- Cyril Clifton, Boatswain, Shell Tankers (U.K.) Ltd.
- Ernest John Coates, Auxiliary Coastguard in Charge, Littlehampton, Sussex.
- Frederick George Coleman, Process and General Supervisory Grade IV, Boom Defence Depot, Fairlie, Ministry of Defence.
- Horace George Compton, Overseer Cable & Wireless, Head Post Office, Chester, Wales and The Marches Postal Region.
- Elizabeth Winnie Cooper, Commandant, Dundee No. 4. V.A.D. Detachment, British Red Cross Society.
- Frederick Copsey, lately Security Patrolman, B.P. Chemicals International Ltd., Great Burgh, Surrey.
- Ann Dorothy Mary Courage, Centre Organiser, Uckfield Rural District, Women's Royal Voluntary Service.
- William Cruden, Safety Officer, John Morgan (Builders) Ltd., Newport, Monmouthshire.
- Bertram George Danby, Messenger, Blackpool, Department of Health and Social Security.
- Rosa Danser, National Savings Street Groups Collector, London Borough of Tower Hamlets.
- James Octavius Davies, Calf Certifying Officer, Ministry of Agriculture, Fisheries and Food.
- John Leslie Davis, Pipe and Sand Plant Operator, Stanton Works, British Steel Corporation.
- Eva Grace Davison, National Savings Street Group Collector, Cromer, Norfolk.
- Ewart Dawes, Radio Operator, Ministry of Defence.
- Percy Henry Dawson, Head Gardener, North-West Europe Area, Commonwealth War Graves Commission.
- John William Demellweek, lately Head Messenger, Office of the Commander in Chief, Portsmouth, Ministry of Defence.
- Charles Stanley Dolman, Experimental Worker Grade II, Explosives Research and Development Establishment, Ministry of Defence.
- Patrick Michael Duggan, Inspector, North Postal Engineering Section, Mount Pleasant, London Postal Region.
- Thomas Francis Dunkley, Assistant Administrative Instructor, Surrey Army Cadet Force.
- Norman Draycott Eglinton, Chief Observer, No. 2 Group, Horsham, Royal Observer Corps.
- Andrew Murray Ellis, MM, Foreign and Commonwealth Office.
- Harold Evans, Shop Manager, G. Blagg Ltd., Builders Merchants, Hednesford, Staffordshire.
- Thomas Alexander Faragher, Sergeant, Liverpool and Bootle Constabulary.
- Mary Ferguson, Collector, Street Savings Group, Wigtown.
- Herbert Stanley Forster, Deputy Overseer, HM Stationery Office.
- Gladys Francis, Foster-mother, Barnet, Hertfordshire.
- Vera Gascoigne, Cook, Home Place Convalescent Home, Holt, Norfolk.
- Robert Gibson, Senior Liaison Officer, Armament Division, Vickers (Elswick) Ltd.
- Hugh Barton Gorman, Constable, Royal Ulster Constabulary.
- Stanley Goulding, Chargehand Fitter, Ministry of Defence.
- Henry George James Grace, Chargehand Fitter, Exeter and North Devon District, South Western Gas Board.
- Edward Plowright Griffiths, Sergeant, Gwynedd Constabulary.
- Muriel Guilding, Voluntary Worker, Friends of Hales Hospital, Norwich, Norfolk.
- Leslie Hall, First Hand Melter, River Don Works, British Steel Corporation.
- Thomas Hartley, lately Dairyman, Preston, Lancashire.
- Florence Hayton, Canteen Manageress, West Yorkshire Constabulary.
- Ella Henderson. For services to the welfare of the elderly in West Lothian.
- Tim Medd Heron, Skilled Erection Fitter and Instructor, W. J. Jenkins & Company Ltd., Retford, Nottinghamshire.
- Robert Alexander Higgs, Chief Operating Theatre Attendant, Southampton General Hospital.
- George Hill, Continental Tours Driver, Sheffield United Tours Ltd.
- Rose Edith May Hook. For services to the Ambulance Service at Kirkby Stephen, Westmorland.
- Joseph William Hootton, District Road Foreman, Cambridgeshire and Isle of Ely County Council.
- Isaac Houfe, Farm Foreman, High Mowthorpe Experimental Husbandry Farm, Ministry of Agriculture, Fisheries and Food.
- John Howie, Ventilation Officer, Scottish South Area, National Coal Board.
- Amy Hughes, National Savings Street Group Collector, Dudley.
- Gerald Ernest Hughes, Senior Chauffeur, Guided Weapons Division, British Aircraft Corporation, Stevenage.
- Owen Humphrey Hughes, Senior Foreman, W. E. Sykes Ltd., Staines, Middlesex.
- Rowland Iles, Driver, British Road Services Ltd., Grimsby.
- Samuel Jamison, Constable, Royal Ulster Constabulary.
- Winifred Emily Jewell, National Savings Street Groups Collector, Perranporth, Truro, Cornwall.
- Ada Jones, Cleaner/Rest Room Attendant, Board of Customs and Excise.
- Charles Henry Jones, Skilled Fitter, Hawker Siddeley Aviation Ltd., Broughton, Flintshire.
- Margaret Jones. For services to the community in Neath, Glamorganshire.
- Ernest Edward Kelly, Leading Chargehand, R.E.M.E., Aldershot, Ministry of Defence.
- Cyril John Hillier King, Deputy Foreman, Science Museum.
- Jack Francis Kingman, Area Inspector, S.W. Division, Southern Region, British Railways Board.
- Maurice Kirkland, Jig Borer, Dowty Rotol, Ltd., Cheltenham.
- Leslie Mason Knight, Assembly Shop Manager, Burgess Micro Switch Company Ltd., Newcastle upon Tyne. For services to Export.
- Albert William Edward Lambkin, Sergeant, Metropolitan Police.
- Beatrix Alice Laney, lately Female Examiner II, Electronics Components Department, Electrical Quality Assurance Directorate, Ministry of Defence.
- Leslie John Leonard, Superintendent, General Services, National Research Development Corporation.
- Cyril George Lineham, Skin Room and Clicking Room Foreman, Church & Company Ltd., Northampton.
- Albert John Long, Fireman, London Fire Brigade.
- Harold Francis Lugg. For services to workers in the milk industry.
- John William Lynn, Donkeyman, MV Corbeach, General Service Contracts.
- James Lyons, Office Keeper Grade III, Scottish Office.
- James McClelland, Sub-Postmaster, Whiteabbey, County Antrim.
- John Stephen McClelland, Section Leader, Northern Ireland Fire Authority.
- John McGuckin, Head Messenger, Ministry of Agriculture for Northern Ireland.
- Edith McKinley, Group Collector, Street Savings Group, Omagh, County Tyrone.
- James McLean, Joiner, Department of the Environment.
- Neil Maclennan, Sub-Postmaster, Lochboisdale, Isle of South Uist.
- John McQuade, Blind Telephone Operator, Grays Employment Exchange, Department of Employment.
- Harold Henry May, Chief Office Keeper, Civil Service Department.
- Hedley Mills, Blacksmith. For services to forestry.
- Joseph Milton, Foreman Plumber, Whittingham Hospital, Preston, Lancashire.
- Richard Andrew Mitchell, Works Superintendent/General Foreman, George Wimpey & Company Ltd.
- John Monks, General Foreman, Quality Control, Ford Motor Company, Dagenham.
- John Taylor Morris, Craftsman, HM S. Dryad, Portsmouth, Ministry of Defence.
- William Anthony Augustine Murtagh, Sergeant, Royal Ulster Constabulary.
- Charles William Henry Mutton, Foreman Tinsmith/Welding Fitter, Plymouth, South Western Gas Board.
- Arthur Henry Naulder, Carpet Repairer, British Broadcasting Corporation.
- Margaret Hilda Nicholas, Member, Worcestershire Branch, British Red Cross Society.
- Philip William Nock, Machine Shop Chargehand, Massey Ferguson Manufacturing Company, Coventry.
- Thomas Edward Nugent, Station Barrack Warden, RAF Leeming, Ministry of Defence.
- John James Westerby Nundy, Sergeant, Lincolnshire Constabulary.
- Cyril Thomas Nurden, Foreign and Commonwealth Office.
- Eric Overton, Inspector, Metropolitan Police.
- Albert George Frederick Palmer. For services to the community, particularly to the elderly in the Colchester district.
- George Frederick Jack Palmer. For services to the community, particularly to the elderly in the Colchester district.
- Frank Parkin, Coastguardsman, HM Coastguard, Eastern Division, Department of Trade and Industry.
- James Robert Paton, Coxswain, Montrose Life-boat, Royal National Life-boat Institution.
- Robert Thomas Peters, Technical Grade 2, National Physical Laboratory, Department of Trade and Industry.
- George Albert Victor Peyton, Fore/nan, Instruments Division, Tomey Industries Ltd., Birmingham.
- Frank Phillips, Assistant Divisional Officer, Swansea Fire Brigade.
- Frederick John Phillips, Chief Observer, No. 13 Group, Fishguard, Royal Observer Corps.
- Harry Phillips, Maintenance Foreman, North Western Electricity Board Headquarters.
- Percy Frank Phillips, Engineroom Storekeeper, British & Commonwealth Shipping Company Ltd.
- George Robert Piggott, lately Head Custodian, Dover Castle, Department of the Environment.
- William James Pinion, Senior Technician, Eastern Telecommunications Region, Post Office.
- Gladys Clyde Pratley, Member, Borough Staff, London Borough of Ealing, Women's Royal Voluntary Service.
- John Louis Quarrie, Sergeant, Metropolitan Police.
- John Quayle, Senior Gardening Instructor, Finchale Training College, Durham.
- Jane Richards, National Savings Street Group Collector, Dolrhedyn, Merioneth.
- Thomas Ellis Roberts, Shepherd, Llysfasi College of Agriculture, Ruthin, Denbighshire.
- Margaret Elizabeth Robertson, Meals-on-Wheels Driver, Edinburgh, Women's Royal Voluntary Service.
- Marcia Robison, Centre Organiser, Haltwhistle Rural District, Women's Royal Voluntary Service.
- William Rollinson, Section Leader, Castings Ltd., Wadsall.
- Louis John Victor Roux, Standard Bearer and Delegate, Rouen Branch, Royal British Legion.
- Mary Nelson Sagar, Chief Supervisor, North Western Telecommunications Region, Post Office.
- Esteban Sciacaluga, Technical Supervisor of Fitters, HM Dockyard, Gibraltar, Ministry of Defence.
- Harold Scurrah, Commandant, City of Bradford Special Constabulary.
- William John Shepherd, Office Keeper Grade III, HM Treasury.
- Arthur Edward Simpson, Colliery Deputy, Frickley/South Elmsall Colliery, Doncaster Area, National Coal Board.
- Douglas Roy Smith, Foreman/Driver, Warwick & Barr Ltd., Haulage Contractors, Whitchurch, Hampshire.
- Henry George Smith, Messenger, Home Office.
- Ivy Millicent South, Supervisor of Cleaners, Home Office.
- William Henry Sparey, Gas Fitter, Epsom, South Eastern Gas Board.
- Evan Richard Spencer, Leading Carriage Examiner (Call Point), London Transport Executive.
- Reginald Charles Squires, lately Leading Officeman, British Transport Hotels Ltd., British Railways Board.
- Charles Stacey, Senior Rougher, Darlington & Simpson Rolling Mills Ltd., Darlington.
- Alexander Mitchell Steel, Inspector, Fife Constabulary.
- John Thomas Stitt, Quantity Surveying Assistant Grade II, Lisburn, County Antrim, Department of the Environment.
- Violet Talbot, Home Help, Warwickshire County Council.
- Leslie Thackray, Surveyor Senior Grade, Ordnance Survey.
- Jean Peggy Thomas, Group Officer, Brighton Fire Brigade.
- Samuel Fulton Thompson, Professional and Technology Officer Grade IV, Royal Naval Aircraft Yard, Belfast, Ministry of Defence.
- Frank William Thornton, Cash Van Assistant, Selnec Passenger Transport Authority, Salford.
- William Granville Tomlinson, Electrical Maintenance Foreman, Nottingham Power Station, Midlands Region, Central Electricity Generating Board.
- Constance Trimmer, School Crossing Patrol, Whetstone and Barnet, Metropolitan Police.
- Jeffrey Albert Urry, Assistant Officer, Board of Customs and Excise, Yarmouth, Isle of Wight.
- Alfred Walter Vardy, Professional and Technology Officer Grade III, Royal Armament Research and Development Establishment, Ministry of Defence.
- Joseph Wallace, Yard Superintendent, Containerway & Roadferry Ltd., Larne, County Antrim.
- Peter Cyril Wallace, Squadron Warrant Officer, No. 301 (Bury St. Edmunds) Squadron, Air Training Corps.
- Harry Walmsley, Instructional Officer Grade 111, Denton Industrial Rehabilitation Unit, Department of Employment.
- Leslie Harold Wattam, Fire Appliance and Rescue Equipment Attendant, Santon Mine, Scunthorpe General Steels Division, British Steel Corporation.
- Benjamin Edward Watts, Yard Foreman, Coventry Scaffolding Ltd.
- Harold Frank Watts, Divisional Commandant, Sussex Special Constabulary.
- Charles James Weeks, Linenkeeper, SS Camito, Fyffes Group Ltd.
- Violet Beatrice Lilian Welsford, Foster Mother, Honicknowle, Plymouth.
- Edward George Werninck, Scenic Painter, British Broadcasting Corporation.
- Russell Albert Whiting, Inspector, Warwickshire and Coventry Constabulary.
- John Wooder Wickland, Auxiliary Coastguardsman, Tenby.
- Cecil Gilbert Wilkin, lately Leading Chargehand Grade I, Colchester, Ministry of Defence.
- Herbert Williams, National Savings Street and Social Groups Collector, Liverpool.
- Leslie Victor Williams, Postman, Head Post Office, Birmingham.
- Roland Wilson, Foreman Welder, Maintenance Services Branch, North Eastern Region, Central Electricity Generating Board.
- Francis William Wiltshire, Labour Co-Ordinator, Port of London Authority.
- Mary Wolfe, Member, Centre Staff, Rickmansworth, Women's Royal Voluntary Service.
- Henry James Wood, Inspector, Metropolitan Police.

Overseas Territories

- Marie Selipha Descartes. For services to folk art and culture in St. Lucia.
- Cecelia Enoe. For services to youth and education in Grenada.
- Rogelio Hernandez, lately Road Superintendent, Gibraltar.
- Rosa Malone. For services to midwifery in the British Virgin Islands.
- Sheila Marie, Accounts Officer, Electricity Department, Seychelles.
- Gerald Martinez, Technical Recording Assistant, Gibraltar Broadcasting Corporation.
- Marcus Pipisi, Headman, West Guadalcanal, British Solomon Islands Protectorate.
- Moti Tuivaka, Warder Sergeant, Gilbert and Ellice Islands Constabulary.

Australian States
State of New South Wales

- James Robert Crome. For services to the community.
- Jack Fardell. For services to the community.
- Grace Catherine Melba Farthing. For services to nursing in Port Macquarie.
- Margaret Jane Gilmore. For services to the community.
- Nellie Gould. For services to sport.
- Noel Haslam Edgar Jennings. For services to the community in Tenterfield.
- Sydney Vincent Kennedy, lately Custodian of Plans, Survey Drafting Branch, Registrar-General's Department.
- Violet May Lewis. For services to the community in Armidale.
- George Scanlen Makim. For services to the community.
- Maud Margaret Molesworth. For services to the community in Ku-ring-gai.
- Alexander Moore Potter. For services to ex-servicemen.
- Joe Rose. For services to art.
- Phillpots Rothman. For services to swimming.
- Mary Olga Sheliah Russell. For services to the community in Coff's Harbour.
- George Robert Mountford Smith. For services to primary industry.
- Wallace Peter Snelson. For services to the community.
- Arthur Gregory Times, Attendant, Government House.
- John Edward Travers, MC. For services to ex-servicemen.
- Lorna Irene Travers. For services to the State.

State of Victoria

- Alexander Paul Anderson. For services to education and youth in Geelong.
- Lorna Lament Banfield. For services to the community in Ararat.
- Hedwig Benz. For services to immigrants as an interpreter in West Heidelberg.
- Archie Trevor Billingham. For services to athletics and to youth in Lara.
- Lawrence Loader Clavarino. For services to fire-fighting and civil defence in Foster.
- Leila Robina Freemantle. For services to the community in Bendigo.
- Ella Frances Gallagher. For services to music and the community in Red Cliffs.
- Eva Veronica Caspar. For services to music in Warrnambool.
- Norman John Grant, of Footscray. For services to football as an Umpire.
- Jessie May Green. For services to the community in Carnegie.
- Jack Grut, lately Town Clerk of Mordialloc.
- Alan McGregor Harris. For services to Toora Urban and Rural Fire Brigades.
- Ernest Henderson. For services to charity in East Malvern.
- Christina Lome Hood. For services to School libraries in Mortlake.
- Dorothy Homann. For voluntary services to hospitals in Caulfield.
- Thomas Vincent Landy. For services to music in Kew.
- Ernest William Lawn of Caulfield. For services to the Supreme Court and to the legal profession.
- Emmeline Margaret Cairns-Lloyd. For voluntary services to the community in South Yarra.
- Mary Elizabeth Bateman Logus. For services as a fund raiser on behalf of charity in Caulfield.
- Robert Alexander McAlpine, JP. For services to the community in Camperdown.
- William Norman Melrose, lately Officer-in-Charge of the Heytesbury Development Area.
- George McIsaac Thomas Morrish. For services to the community in Ouyen.
- Richard Nicholas. For services to the community in Oakleigh.
- Estelle Agnes Rennie. Secretary to the Vice-Chancellor, University of Melbourn.
- Mabel Emma Skelton. For services to the community in Sorrento.
- Nell Mary Taylor. For services to the blind in Prahran.
- Annie Wornes. For services to the community, and especially to hospitals in Wodonga.

=== Royal Red Cross (RRC) ===
- Patricia Gould, ARRC, Principal Matron, Queen Alexandra's Royal Naval Nursing Service.
- Lieutenant-Colonel Nancy Marson (218382), Queen Alexandra's Royal Army Nursing Corps.
- Air Commandant Ann Smith McDonald, CB, ARRC, QHNS, Princess Mary's Royal Air Force Nursing Service.

==== Associate of the Royal Red Cross (ARRC) ====
- Jean Hurworth, Matron, Queen Alexandra's Royal Naval Nursing Service.
- Lieutenant-Colonel Julia Gahan (252835), Queen Alexandra's Royal Army Nursing Corps, now R.A.R.O.
- Major Elizabeth Kathleen O'Sullivast (432861), Queen Alexandra's Royal Army Nursing Corps.
- Major Enid Margaret Thomas (441035), Queen Alexandra's Royal Army Nursing Corps, now Retired.

=== Air Force Cross (AFC) ===
Royal Navy

- Lieutenant Commander Edgar Michael Horne.

Royal Air Force

- Squadron Leader Jeremy John Lee (2617332).
- Squadron Leader John Richard Owen (607871).
- Squadron Leader Peter Wilson (168291).
- Flight Lieutenant Michael Minshall Charles (4231009).
- Flight Lieutenant Terence Rodney Francis (4231411).
- Flight Lieutenant Alastafr Alfred Holyoake (3054036).
- Flight Lieutenant Alan David George Jones (508242).
- Flight Lieutenant Joseph Leon Jean Claude Le Brun (507133).

=== Air Force Medal (AFM) ===
Royal Air Force

- N0683180 Flight Sergeant Reginald Wilfred Desmond Bye.
- D4112814 Flight Sergeant Peter John Quinney.
- B4153188 Flight Sergeant Keith John Teesdale.

=== Queen's Police Medal (QPM) ===
England and Wales

- Philip Alan Myers, Chief Constable, Gwynedd Constabulary.
- Alan Goodson, Deputy Chief Constable, Essex and Southend-on-Sea Joint Constabulary.
- David Bradley, Assistant Chief Constable, West Yorkshire Constabulary.
- Patrick Ross, Assistant Chief Constable, Sussex Constabulary.
- Alistair Macintyre Campbell MacGregor, Commander, City of London Police.
- Ernest Radcliffe Bond, Commander, Metropolitan Police.
- Robert Allan Peat, Commander, Metropolitan Police.
- Irving Edward King, lately Commander, Metropolitan Police.
- Lily Jane Leach, Chief Superintendent, Lancashire Constabulary.
- Henry George Williams, Chief Superintendent, Birmingham City Police, seconded as Co-ordinator, No. 4 Regional Crime Squad.
- Frederick Moore Mallin, Chief Superintendent, South Wales Constabulary.
- Richard Foster, Chief Superintendent, Manchester and Salford Police.
- Ronald Wigley, Chief Superintendent, Leicester and Rutland Constabulary.
- Ivor Glynn Shepherd, Chief Superintendent, Staffordshire County and Stoke-on-Trent, Constabulary.

Northern Ireland

- Joseph Leo McBrien, Chief Inspector, Royal Ulster Constabulary.

Scotland

- Andrew Lindsay McClure, Chief Constable, Inverness Constabulary.
- William Milne Rae, Assistant Chief Constable, City of Glasgow Police.

Overseas Territories

- Peter Fitzroy Godber, Chief Superintendent, Royal Hong Kong Police Force.
- Henry Lin Hsing-chih, Senior Superintendent, Royal Hong Kong Police Force.

Australian States
State of New South Wales

- Robert Arthur Barnett Allen, Superintendent, 3rd Class, New South Wales Police Force.
- William James Brown, Superintendent, 2nd Class, New South Wales Police Force.
- Alfred Barton Cameron, Superintendent, 1st Class, New South Wales Police Force.
- Charles Power Cantwell, Superintendent 2nd Class, New South Wales Police Force.
- Raymond Noel Hamer, Superintendent, 2nd Class, New South Wales Police Force.
- Reginald Hamilton Lucas, Superintendent, 2nd Class, New South Wales Police Force.
- Leslie Victor Moore, Detective Superintendent, 3rd Class, New South Wales Police Force.
- Roy Cecil Slocombe, Detective Inspector, 1st Class, New South Wales Police Force.
- Robert Orlando Walton, Superintendent, 3rd Class, New South Wales Police Force.
- Herbert Neville White, Superintendent, 3rd Class, New South Wales Police Force.

State of Victoria

- Oswald Henry Beever, Chief Inspector, Victoria Police Force.
- Alexander Leslie Buckler, Chief Inspector, Victoria Police Force.
- Michael Hanley, Superintendent, Victoria Police Force.
- Frederick Taylor Kennedy, Chief Superintendent, Victoria Police Force.
- Herbert Ray Morshead, Senior Constable, No. 9272, Victoria Police Force.
- William Charles Woods, Chief Superintendent, Victoria Police Force.

State of Western Australia

- John McKinley Meakins, Superintendent, Western Australian Police Force.
- William Henry John Nielson, Superintendent, Western Australian Police Force.
- Ronald Henry Sims, Deputy Commissioner, Western Australian Police Force.

=== Queen's Fire Services Medal (QFSM) ===
England and Wales

- Donald Robert Burrell, Assistant Chief Officer, London Fire Brigade.
- Neville Chilton Mountford, MBE, Chief Officer, Northamptonshire Fire Brigade.
- Arthur Thomas Sennett, Deputy Assistant Chief Officer, London Fire Brigade.
- Harry Sheldon, Chief Officer, Chester Fire Brigade.

Scotland

- David McMurtrie, Deputy Firemaster (Divisional Officer Grade II), Perth and Kinross Fire Brigade.

Australian States
State of Victoria

- Frank Edward Tueno, Chief Fire Officer, Metropolitan Fire Brigade, Melbourne.

=== Colonial Police Medal (CPM) ===
Overseas Territories

- Collis Barrow, Inspector, Royal St. Lucia Police Force.
- Joseph Louis Canepa, Superintendent, Gibraltar Police Force.
- Paul Chan Cheuk-kei, Senior Inspector, Royal Hong Kong Police Force.
- Chan Yeun-cheung, Inspector, Royal Hong Kong Police Force.
- Leslie Clark, Senior Inspector, Royal Hong Kong Auxiliary Police Force.
- Gordon Doore, Senior Divisional Officer, Hong Kong Fire Services.
- Fung Chi-sang, Principal Fireman, Hong Kong Fire Services.
- Fung Shun, Senior Fireman, Hong Kong Fire Services.
- Manawar Hussain, Sergeant, Royal Hong Kong Police Force.
- John Ronaldson Johnston, Superintendent, Royal Hong Kong Police Force.
- Montague Kingdom, Senior Divisional Officer, Hong Kong Fire Services.
- William McIntyre Ross, Superintendent, Royal Hong Kong Police Force.
- Siu Sang, Senior Fireman, Hong Kong Fire Services.
- Charles Smith, Chief Inspector, Royal Hong Kong Police Force.
- Matthew Taylor, Superintendent, Royal Hong Kong Police Force.
- Herbert James Woodthorpe, Assistant Superintendent, Royal Hong Kong Auxiliary Police Force.
- Yau Tat-fung, Assistant Divisional Officer, Hong Kong Fire Services.

=== Queen's Commendation for Valuable Service in the Air ===
Royal Air Force

- Squadron Leader Anthony John Bendell, AFC, (3517266).
- Squadron Leader John Antony Joseph Farrell (1609671).
- Squadron Leader Peter Brigstocke Isherwood (4174043).
- Squadron Leader Roger Hewlett Palin (507462).
- Squadron Leader Richard Michael Raeburn (3122328).
- Squadron Leader John Gilbert Sheldon (2620340).
- Squadron Leader Joseph Kerr Sim (608065).
- Flight Lieutenant James Robert Bowman (3517202).
- Flight Lieutenant Bruce Adrian Charles Chapple (4231616).
- Flight Lieutenant Peter Geoffrey Cowen (608080).
- Flight Lieutenant Marshall Edward Hall (4146169).
- Flight Lieutenant David Edward Hilton (592876).
- Flight Lieutenant James Scott Hogg (4032543).
- Flight Lieutenant John Patrick Holland (4031509).
- Flight Lieutenant Philip Patrick William Lowe (4230943).
- Flight Lieutenant Charles William Lyons, AFM, (1867544).
- Flight Lieutenant Alexander Clive Monteath Nicholson (2619508).
- Flight Lieutenant Alexander William Pirrie (2562235).
- Flight Lieutenant Robert Edward Turner (4230892).
- Flying Officer Ronald William Brian Pattinson (2618048).
- Flying Officer Rodney Alec Sargeant (4233087).

United Kingdom

- Gerald Henry Easton, Senior Captain First Class, British Overseas Airways Corporation.
- Roy John Stuart Hermes, Airline Captain, Manager Boeing 707 Fleet, British Caledonian Airways Ltd.
- Arthur Thomas Hollis, Manager, Navigation Services, British Caledonian Airways Ltd.
- Derek Mason, Assistant Flight Manager, Training, British European Airways Airtours Ltd.
- William Harold Cyril Williams, Engineer Officer Instructor, British Overseas Airways Corporation.

== Australia ==
=== Knight Bachelor ===
- Robert Crichton-Brown, CBE, of Bellevue Hill, New South Wales. For distinguished services to finance and the community.
- Edward Thomas Cain, CBE, Commissioner of Taxation.
- The Honourable Charles Walter Michael Court, OBE, MLA, of Nedlands, Western Australia. For distinguished services to government and national development.
- John Brian Massy-Greene, of Woollahra, New South Wales. For distinguished services to finance, mining and government.
- Pastor Douglas Ralph Nicholls, OBE, of Northcote, Victoria. For distinguished services to the advancement of the Aboriginal people.
- William Walter Pettingell, CBE, of Castlecrag, New South Wales. For distinguished services to finance and government.
- Benjamin Keith Rank, CMG, of Heidelberg, Victoria. For distinguished services to medicine.
- Patrick Shaw, CBE, Australian High Commissioner in India.
- Alvin Burton Taylor, of Warrawee, New South Wales. For distinguished services to commerce, finance and government.

=== Order of the Bath ===
==== Companion of the Order of the Bath (CB) ====
Military Division

- Air Marshal Charles Frederick Read, CBE, DFC, AFC, (0367), Royal Australian Air Force, Chief of the Air Staff.

=== Order of Saint Michael and Saint George ===
==== Companion of the Order of St Michael and St George (CMG) ====
- George Garrett Burniston, OBE, Director, Department of Physical Medicine and Rehabilitation, Teaching Hospitals of University of New South Wales.
- Philip Henry Jeffery, OBE, of Parramatta, New South Wales. For services to the community.
- Reginald Byron Leonard, OBE, of St. Lucia, Queensland. For services to the newspaper industry.
- John Eric Rankin, of Northbridge, New South Wales. For services to commerce.
- Edwin Harold Tytherleigh, MBE, of Sutton Forest, New South Wales. For services to finance and international relations.

=== Order of the British Empire ===
==== Knight Commander of the Order of the British Empire (KBE) ====
Military Division

- Lieutenant-General Mervyn Francis Brogan, CB, CBE, Chief of the General Staff.

Civil Division

- The Honourable Reginald William Colin Swartz, MBE, ED, MP, Minister for National Development and Leader of the House of Representatives.
- The Most Reverend Dr. Frank Woods, Primate of Australia and Archbishop of Melbourne.

==== Commander of the Order of the British Empire (CBE) ====
Military Division

- Rear Admiral Brynmor Wheatley Mussared, Royal Australian Navy. Project Director, Royal Australian Navy's Light Destroyer Programme.
- Brigadier Keith Royce Colwill (17537), Australian Staff Corps, Deputy Quarter-Master General, Army Headquarters.
- Air Commodore Horton Douglas Marsh DFC, (0382), Royal Australian Air Force, Officer Commanding RAAF Base Richmond.

Civil Division

- The Most Reverend Dr. Thomas Vincent Cahill, Archbishop of Canberra and Goulburn.
- Douglas Haig Freeman, of Killara, New South Wales. For services to industry and government.
- George Fuller Godfrey, of Mosman, New South Wales. For services to journalism.
- John Guise, MHA, Member and former Speaker, Papua New Guinea House of Assembly.
- Leslie Bruce Hamilton, OBE, Director-General, Department of Social Services.
- Beryl McFadyen, OBE, of Bellevue Hill, New South Wales. For continued services to the dependants of ex-servicemen.
- Henry Wells Rowden, of Berwick, Victoria. For services to industry, finance and government.
- Kenneth Smithers, of Warrawee, New South Wales. For services to law.
- Raymond Harold Whittorn, MP, of Brighton, Victoria. For services to politics and the community.

==== Officer of the Order of the British Empire (OBE) ====
Military Division

Royal Australian Navy

- Commander Keith Alexander Williams.

Royal Australian Military Forces

- Lieutenant-Colonel Eric Robert McCully (5366), Royal Australian Infantry Corps.
- Colonel Peter Henry Griffith Oxley (2298), Australian Staff Corps.
- Lieutenant-Colonel Howard Major Taylor, ED, (368010), Royal Australian Infantry Corps.

Royal Australian Air Force

- Wing Commander Jack Francis Mitchell (035493).
- Principal Air Chaplain Bernard David O'Regan (0314435).
- Wing Commander Colin William Spitzkowsky (0213658).

Civil Division

- Reuben Aaron, of North Bondi, New South Wales. For services to the community.
- James Lawrence Allen, Australian High Commissioner to Bangladesh.
- Adam Alexander Armstrong, MC, of Deniliquin, New South Wales. For political and public services.
- Peter Hamilton Bailey, Deputy Secretary, Department of the Prime Minister and Cabinet.
- James Cuming Campbell, of Caulfield, Victoria. For services to industry and industrial relations.
- William Frederick Carter, Director, Posts and Telegraphs, Papua New Guinea.
- Kathleen Danetree, of Curl Curl, New South Wales. For services to ballet.
- Ralph Chelmsford Davis, of Toorak, Victoria. For services to the transport industry and to government.
- Betty Constance Laura Doubleday, Chief Librarian, Commonwealth Scientific and Industrial Research Organisation.
- William Albert Flick, of Newport, New South Wales. For services to industry and export.
- Alfred Silva Harril Gifford, DCM, of Burwood, Victoria. For services to the community.
- Bede Gregory Hartcher, of Garrari, Australian Capital Territory. For services to politics.
- Emeritus Professor Alec Derwent Hope, of Forrest, Australian Capital Territory. For services to literature.
- Murray Wentworth Howell, of Toorak, Victoria. For services to the mining industry.
- Jeffrey Penfold-Hyland, of Elizabeth Bay, New South Wales. For services to the wine industry.
- Nathan Jacobson, of Caulfield, Victoria. For services to the community.
- William Henry Johns, of Port Moresby, Papua New Guinea. For services to the Government and the community.
- Harold Welbourn King, of Magill, South Australia. For services to primary industry.
- George Sugden Le Couteur, of Pymble, New South Wales. For services to finance and the community.
- Francis Joseph Mahony, Deputy Secretary, Attorney-General's Department.
- Keith John Carson Mitchell, of Warwick, Queensland. For services to primary industry.
- Sandford Saul Neville, of Research, Victoria. For services to the wool industry.
- John Manfield Newton, of Pordon, New South Wales. For services to dentistry.
- Clarence Thomas Pullan, of Nedlands, Western Australia. For services to industry and to Government.
- Lloyd-Robert Maxwell Ross, of Hunter's Hill, New South Wales. For services to industrial relations and the arts.
- Harry Seidler, of Killara, New South Wales. For services to architecture.
- Clement William Semmler, of Longueville, New South Wales. For services to literature.
- Neal Francis Stevens, of Killara, New South Wales. For assistance to government and to finance.
- Freda Mary Thompson, of Toorak, Victoria. For services to aviation.
- Harold Stannett Williams, of Kobe, Japan. For services to historical research.

==== Member of the Order of the British Empire (MBE) ====
Military Division

Royal Australian Navy

- Lieutenant-Commander Ralph Trethowan Derbidge.
- Lieutenant-Commander Thomas Wentworth Vance.
- Lieutenant-Commander Lindsay Gordon Wilson.

Royal Australian Military Forces

- Major Frederick John Anderson (337547), Royal Australian Infantry Corps.
- Major Norman Stanley Blackburn, ED, (3905005), Royal Australian Corps of Signals.
- Warrant Officer Class I John Brian Cavanagh (32407), Royal Australian Army Ordnance Corps.
- Captain Harold Charles Christiansen (2557), Royal Australian Armoured Corps.
- Warrant Officer Class II Robin Alexander Collins (113499), Royal Australian Artillery.
- Warrant Officer Class I John Grant Currie (11811), Royal Australian Infantry Corps.
- Warrant Officer Class II Daniel Garnon (2238423), Royal Australian Infantry Corps.
- Warrant Officer Class I Norman Herbert Goldspink (51811), Royal Australian Infantry Corps.
- Captain Robert Henry Peter Porter (3619), Royal Australian Artillery.
- Warrant Officer Class I Frank Joseph Bert Scott (26221), Royal Australian Corps of Signals.

Royal Australian Air Force

- Warrant Officer Mervyn Hartley Clark (A41569).
- Warrant Officer Allan Wyndham Conway (A14394).
- Warrant Officer Walter James Leiper (A11385).
- Squadron Leader Vincent Joseph O'Brien (02774).
- Squadron Leader Herbert Ernest Alfred Stanton (035041).

Civil Division

- Cyril Bruce Andrew, of West Mentone, Victoria. For services to sport.
- Stanley Messenger Arms, of Wangaratta, Victoria. For services to industry and the community.
- William Tuxford Atkin, of Northcote, Victoria. For services to the church and the community.
- Allyn Gordon Bryant, of Mount Hawthorn, Western Australia. For services to handicapped people.
- Albert Ernest Winton Burrell, of Griffith, New South Wales. For services to the community.
- Donald Vernon Burrows, of Sans Souci, New South Wales. For services to jazz music.
- Norman Cashman, of Five Dock, New South Wales. For services to real estate, local government and the community.
- Percy Wells Cerutty, of Portsea, Victoria. For services to sport and physical fitness.
- Henry Thomas Clarke, Deputy Paymaster-in-Chief, Department of the Army.
- Nan Dobie, of Hamilton, Queensland. For services to the community over many years.
- Peter Neville Fleming, of St. Georges, South Australia. For services to ex-servicemen and women.
- Alan Lindsay Fogg, Director, Department of Foreign Affairs.
- John Lionel Gazzard, of Granville, New South Wales. For public service.
- Leo Denis Vaughan Hanly, of Floreat Park, Western Australia. For services to music.
- John Keith Holdsworth, of Kilsyth, Victoria. For services to the blind.
- Royce Harry Kronborg, of Ivanhoe, Victoria. For services to hospital administration.
- Doreen Ida Lawrence, of Campbell, Australian Capital Territory. For services to international relations.
- William Bing Lee, of Darwin, Northern Territory. For services to the community.
- William Frederick Leslie Liggins, of Ashfield, New South Wales. For services to the community.
- Mervin Wallace Linklater, of Gymea, New South Wales. For services to scouting.
- Alan Frederick George McDougall, of Burwood, New South Wales. For services to ex-servicemen and women.
- Reverend Brother Camillus William Maye, of South Melbourne, Victoria. For long services to under-privileged boys.
- David Fitzroy Millar, of Kilcoy, Queensland. For services to the community and in particular ex-servicemen and women.
- Eileen Marie Murphy, Matron, Lady Davidson Hospital, Turramurra, New South Wales.
- The Reverend Ronald Arthur O'Brien. For services to the Church and the community.
- Morgan Patrick O'Reilly, formerly Superintendent, Personnel Branch, Postmaster-General's Department, Queensland.
- Alfred Oswald Payne, of East Ivanhoe, Victoria. For services to the aircraft industry.
- David Maxwell Purnell, of Braddon, Australian Capital Territory. For services to the community.
- Sheila Sanderson Reid, Receptionist, Australia House, London.
- Carl Rodgers, of Armadale, Western Australia. For services to the poultry industry.
- Alan Scurrah, of Ascot, Queensland. For services to the community.
- Harry Seldon, of Croydon Park, New South Wales. For long services to the community.
- Elizabeth Catherine Sexton, of Reid, Australian Capital Territory. For long services to girl guiding.
- Edna Mary Sharrock, of Bribbaree, New South Wales. For services to migration and to welfare of country women.
- Walter Shepherd, of Claremont, Western Australia. For services to education.
- Geebank Sifuyu, of Finschhafen, Papua New Guinea. For services to the development of co-operatives in Papua New Guinea.
- Rose Skinner, of Perth, Western Australia. For services to art.
- Jessie Adele Smith, of Darwin, Northern Territory. For services to the Aboriginal people.
- Albert William Stagey, of West Ryde, New South Wales. For services to the community.
- Alfred George Stafford, Ministerial Attendant, Parliament House.
- Harrie Standen, of Bamu River Mission, Papua. For missionary work in Papua since 1926.
- Florence Stobert, of Kelvin Grove, Queensland. For services to incapacitated ex-servicemen.
- The Reverend Gordon Joseph Symons, of Darwin. Northern Territory. For services to the Methodist Church and the Aboriginal people.
- William Thomas Tait, of Moree, New South Wales. For services to local government and the community, particularly pensioners.
- Methuselah Topuek Tonata, of Rabaul. For services to broadcasting in Papua New Guinea.
- William Richard Tresise, of Lennox Head, New South Wales. For services to the community.
- Hazel Elizabeth Treweek, of Lindfield, New South Wales. For assistance to Asian students in Australia.
- Joan Eileen Usher, of Port Macquarie, New South Wales. For services to international relations and the community.
- Darcy Wearne, of Belfield, New South Wales. For services to the welfare of ex-servicemen and women.
- Commander John David Lewis Williams, DSC, Royal Navy (retired), of Hobart, Tasmania. Regional Controller, Department of Shipping and Transport.
- Bernard Garnett Williss, of Second Valley, South Australia. For services to the community.
- Kathleen Margaret Winning, of Burradoo, New South Wales. For services to child health and infant welfare.
- George Winunjug, of Goulburn Island. For services to the community and the performing arts.

=== Companion of the Imperial Service Order (ISO) ===
- Noel Charles Daniel Allen, Assistant Secretary, Department of Air.
- Harold Vivian Fealy, Chief Auditor, Auditor-General's Office, Victoria.
- Philip Morris Hosken, of Annerley, Queensland. Assistant Director (Engineering), Postmaster-General's Department.
- David William Shoobridge, Director, Parks and Gardens Branch, Department of the Interior.

=== British Empire Medal (BEM) ===
Military Division

Royal Australian Navy

- Chief Mechanician (A.E.) Francis Collins (R48281).
- Radio Supervisor Brian West Coultas (R41775).
- Chief Petty Officer Cook Gordon Leslie Craze (R36101).
- Chief Petty Officer Coxswain Kevin Patrick Wilkie (R3S223).

Royal Australian Military Forces

- Sergeant William John Booth (2167854), Royal Australian Infantry Corps.
- Sergeant Clarence William Clifton (54010), Royal Australian Infantry Corps.
- Corporal Francis John Cronin (25794), Royal Australian Electrical and Mechanical Engineers.
- Sergeant (Temporary Warrant Officer Class II) Francis Alfred Bring (373256), Australian Intelligence Corps.
- Sergeant (Temporary Warrant Officer Class II) Albert Thomas McNamara (16507), Royal Australian Engineers.
- Staff Sergeant Albert Robert Owens (210426), Royal Australian Artillery.
- Sergeant William James Sheehan (22449), Australian Army Band Corps.
- Sergeant Irene Stacker (F28236), Women's Royal Australian Army Corps.

Royal Australian Air Force

- Flight Sergeant Alan Wilson McDonald (A21657).
- Flight Sergeant Jack William Hargrave Miles (A51340).
- Corporal Godfrey John Olsen (A19521).
- Flight Sergeant Donald Edward Skinner (A310829).
- Flight Sergeant William Norman Edward Taylor (A216525).

Civil Division

- Edith Muriel Allen, Nursing Sister, Commonwealth Department of Health.
- Keith Beaty, of Kogarah, New South Wales. For assistance to welfare of dependants of ex-servicemen.
- Mavis Mary Bentley, Hospital Assistants' Supervisor, Repatriation General Hospital, Concord, New South Wales.
- Peter Beor, of Bentley, Western Australia. For assistance to migrants.
- Gertrude Ada Border, of Coonabarabran, New South Wales. For services to the community.
- Henry Bernard Bradford, Senior Inspecting Officer, Department of the Army.
- James William Bradshaw, Handyman, Admiralty House.
- Harold Charles Bull, Senior Technical Officer, Department of the Navy.
- Ernest Roy Clout, Assistant Manager (Administration), Department of Supply, Sydney.
- Doris Hazel Coleman, of Narrabri, New South Wales. For services to the community.
- Ruby Coulson, of Cronulla, New South Wales. For services to servicemen and exservicemen.
- Florence Croot, of Hurstvffle, New South Wales. For services to the community.
- Elizabeth D'Arbon, of Singleton, New South Wales. For services to the community.
- Robert Lewin Davis, of Darling Point, New South Wales. For services to the community.
- George William Ashley Davison, Clerical Assistant, Mercantile Marine Office, Department of Shipping and Transport.
- Reginald Allen Ellison, of Penrith, New South Wales. For services to ex-servicemen and women.
- John Richard Etheridge, Experimental Officer, Commonwealth Scientific and Industrial Research Organisation.
- Ernest Harold Fowler, of Peterborough, South Australia. For services to the community and local government.
- Nina Lilla Gray, of Rhodes, New South Wales. For services to the community.
- Audrey Gladys Harvey, of Cronulla, New South Wales. For services to the community.
- Hannah Mary Henkel, of Nowra, New South Wales. For services to ex-servicemen and women.
- Clifford William Herbert, Superintendent (Station Services), Commonwealth Railways.
- David Edward Hopkins, of Renmark, South Australia. For services to the community.
- Frederick Mils Jacobson, of Adelaide, South Australia. For services to pensioners and children.
- Elsie Jane Jelbart, of Katoomba, New South Wales. For services to the community.
- Ella Lillian Jemison, of Ramco, South Australia. For services to the community.
- Raymond Alfred Norman Kelly, of Griffith, Australian Capital Territory. For services to ex-servicemen and women.
- Hugh Dudley Kruger, Chief Health Inspector, Department of Health.
- William Ivor Lewis, of Wilcannia, New South Wales. For services to the community.
- Gavera Lohia, of Port Moresby, Papua New Guinea, Officer-in-Charge, Mailing and Despatch Section, Post Office Philatelic Bureau.
- Essie Beatrice May McDonald, Official Postmistress, Central Lansdowne, New South Wales, since 1944.
- Annie Elizabeth Burdett Mallard, of Oatley West, New South Wales. For services to the community.
- Hubert Rex Mitchelhill, Mechanical Engineer, Reserve Bank of Australia.
- Alfred Charles Mofflin, of Alice Springs, Northern Territory. Formerly Sergeant, Northern Territory Police Force.
- Peter Gay Morris, of Avalon, New South Wales. For assisting persons afflicted with kidney disease.
- Andrew Robson Morton, of Queanbeyan, New South Wales. For services to sport and physical fitness.
- Leslie Frank Moyle, Postmaster, Greenacres, South Australia.
- Jack Wallace Munro, of Bermagui South, New South Wales. For services to the community.
- Liola Doreen Myers, of Shortland, New South Wales. For services to the community.
- Gacomino Natoli, of Five Dock, New South Wales. For services to the Italian community.
- Rebecca Gertrude Poole, of Eastwood, New South Wales. For services to the community.
- Leslie James Ridley, of Yarraville, Victoria. Formerly Chief Postal Investigation Officer, Postmaster-General's Department.
- Alfred James Rogers, of Tuart Hill, Western Australia. For services to the community.
- William John Sandwith, of Kyle Bay, New South Wales. For services to the community.
- Ernest David Sprudd, of Belmont South, New South Wales. For services to scouting.
- Jeannie Sutherland, of Kew, Victoria. For services to education.
- James Bernard Toner, of Baroko, Papua New Guinea. For his contribution to academic research.
- Hendrika Timmerman, of East Devonport, Tasmania. For assistance to migrants.
- Eida Vaccari, of Toorak, Victoria. For services to migrants.
- Greta Mary Winch, of Long Jetty, New South Wales. For services to the community.

=== Royal Red Cross (RRC) ===
==== Associate of the Royal Red Cross (ARRC) ====
- Major Thora Jean Long (F36), Royal Australian Army Nursing Corps.

=== Air Force Cross (AFC) ===
Royal Australian Air Force

- Squadron Leader John Stewart Back (0216336).
- Squadron Leader Murray Alexander Turnbull (0219324).

=== Queen's Commendation for Valuable Service in the Air ===
- Captain Graeme Roderick Maughan (16896), Australian Army Aviation Corps.

== Mauritius ==
=== Order of the British Empire ===
==== Officer of the Order of the British Empire (OBE) ====
Civil Division

- Leon Andre Melotte, lately Public Assistance Commissioner, Ministry of Social Security.
- Ramnarain Nuboo Roy. For voluntary social work and services to the sugar industry and the economy of Mauritius.

==== Member of the Order of the British Empire (MBE) ====
Civil Division

- Mahmood Gopaul, lately Deputy Chief Surveyor, Ministry of Housing, Lands and Town and Country Planning.
- Marie Lise Yolande Herbereau de Lachaise, lately Inspector of Schools.
- Charles McKay Lingaya, Rehabilitation Officer, Ministry of Health.
- Joseph Robert Planteau de Maroussem. For services to sport and especially to football.
- Brijchand Mungur. For services to Hindi Literature.
- Ramlugun Sewgobind. For long service to the teaching of Hindi.

=== Queen's Police Medal (QPM) ===
- Joseph Albert Jupin de Fondaumiere, MVO, Commissioner, Mauritius Police Force.

== Fiji ==
=== Order of the British Empire ===
==== Officer of the Order of the British Empire (OBE) ====
Civil Division

- The Venerable Charles William Whonsbon-Aston, Archdeacon Emeritus. For services to the peoples of the South Pacific and especially Fiji and to the Church.

==== Member of the Order of the British Empire (MBE) ====
Civil Division

- Girwar Prasad. For services to Government and the community.
- Ratu Jeremaia Natoko Tavaiqia, JP. For service to his own people and the community at large.

=== British Empire Medal (BEM) ===
Military Division

- Pay Sergeant Filipe Maka, Royal Fiji Military Forces.

== Barbados ==
=== Order of the British Empire ===
==== Commander of the Order of the British Empire (CBE) ====
Civil Division

- Senator Frederick Colin Hugh Carew. For public service, especially as Chairman of the Urban Development Corporation.
- The Honourable Cuthbert Edwy Talma, MP, Minister of State and Leader of the House of Assembly.

==== Member of the Order of the British Empire (MBE) ====
Civil Division

- Dennis Ambrose Smith, Chief Electoral Officer, Ministry of Home Affairs.
