= Frank Murphy (disambiguation) =

Frank Murphy (1890–1949) was a governor of Michigan and later justice of the United States Supreme Court.

Frank Murphy may also refer to:

== Arts and entertainment ==
- Frank Murphy (architect) (1916–1993), Irish architect
- Frank Murphy (radio personality) (fl. 1980s–present), American radio producer / deejay
- Frank Murphy, fictional character from the 1983 film Blue Thunder
- Frank Murphy, fictional character in the 2003 film Pullin' the Devil by the Tail
- Frank Murphy, fictional character in the American television series F Is for Family

== Politics and law ==
- Frank Reid Murphy (1844–1892), Australian politician, member of the Queensland Legislative Assembly
- B. Frank Murphy (1867–1938), U.S. representative from Ohio
- Frank Murphy (Michigan legislator) (1878–?), American politician, Michigan state representative
- Frank Murphy (public servant) (1893–1949), Australian public servant
- Frank E. Murphy (1896–?), American politician, Michigan state representative
- Frank Murphy (lieutenant governor) (1897–1944), American politician, lieutenant governor of Michigan
- Frank Murphy Jr. (1934–2022), American politician, California state assemblyman

== Sports ==
- Frank Murphy (baseball) (1876–1912), American Major League Baseball player
- Frank Murphy (pole vaulter) (1889–1980), American pole vaulter
- Frank Murphy (footballer, born 1900) (1900–1953), Australian rules footballer for Carlton and Hawthorn
- Frank Murphy (Australian rules footballer) (1905–1995), Australian rules footballer for Collingwood
- Frank Murphy (footballer, born 1915) (1915–1984), Scottish footballer for Celtic
- Frank Murphy (sports administrator) (born 1944), Irish athletic administrator
- Frank Murphy (runner) (1947–2017), Irish middle-distance runner
- Frank Murphy (footballer, born 1959), Scottish footballer for Kettering and Nuneaton
- Frank Murphy (gridiron football) (born 1977), American NFL football player
- Frank Murphy (rugby union) (born 1981), Irish rugby union player

== Others ==
- Frank E. Murphy (farmer) (fl. early 1900s), American businessman in Wisconsin who developed Murphy Farms Number 1
- Frank Murphy (RNZAF officer) (1917–1997), British-born New Zealand flying ace of the Second World War

== See also ==
- Francis Murphy (disambiguation)
- Franklin Murphy (disambiguation)
