= Forster baronets =

Set index for Forster baronets

There have been six Forster baronetcies, four in the Baronetage of England, one in the Baronetage of Ireland and one in the Baronetage of the United Kingdom. All are extinct.

- Forster baronets of Bamburgh (1620): see Sir Claudius Forster, 1st Baronet (c. 1575–1623)
- Forster baronets of Aldermaston (1620)
- Forster baronets of Stokesley (1649)
- Forster baronets of East Greenwich (1661)
- Forster baronets of Coolderry (1794)
- Forster baronets of Lysways Hall (1874)
- Forster baronets of The Grange (1912): see Sir Ralph Forster, 1st Baronet (1850–1930)
