= 1925 Walsall by-election =

UK parliamentary by-election

← 1924	27 February 1925	1929 →
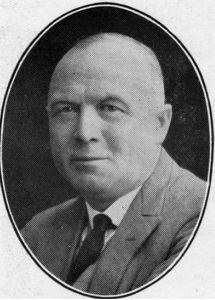

Candidate	William Preston	Thomas Macnamara	Lothian Small
Party	Unionist	Liberal	Labour
Popular vote	14,793	12,300	11,610
Percentage	38.2%	31.8%	30.0%
MP before election
William Preston
Unionist
Subsequent MP
William Preston
Unionist

The 1925 Walsall by-election was held on 27 February 1925. The by-election was held due to the disqualification of the incumbent Unionist MP, William Preston. It was retained by Preston.

== Vacancy ==
The by-election was caused by the disqualification of the sitting Unionist MP, William Preston. He had only been an MP since the General Election of 1924. However, following his election, it was discovered that Preston had received payments for two small contracts to supply electrical fittings to the Post Office Stores Department. As a government contractor, Preston was ineligible to stand for parliament, and his election was declared void.

== Electoral history ==
The constituency was created for the 1832 general election. Over the years, the seat frequently changed hands between Liberal and Conservative. The Labour Party first ran a candidate in 1918. The Liberal Pat Collins had won in both 1922 and 1923 before Preston won in 1924;

General election 1924: Walsall
Party	Candidate	Votes	%	±%
Unionist	William Preston	15,168	37.9	+0.1
Liberal	Pat Collins	12,734	31.8	−11.7
Labour	Lothian Small	11,474	28.7	+10.0
Independent	J J Lynch	622	1.6	New
Majority		2,434	6.1	N/A
Turnout		39,398		
Unionist gain from Liberal		Swing		

== Candidates ==
- Having overcome his legal difficulties, the Walsall Unionist Association re-selected 51-year-old William Preston as their candidate. He was educated at Walsall Grammar School and Weston School, Bath. In 1907 he married Lilly Swinton Sanders, and he became managing director of William Sanders & Co (Wednesbury) Limited, a major manufacturer of electrical switching equipment.
- Pat Collins who had sat as Liberal MP for Walsall until losing to Preston in the void election, seemed the obvious candidate. However Collins chose to withdraw due to ill-health. On 13 February 1925 the Executive Council of the Walsall Liberal Association adopted 64-year-old Rt Hon. Thomas Macnamara as their candidate. He had been Liberal MP in Camberwell, London from 1900 until his defeat at the 1924 general election. He had served as Minister of Labour under Prime Minister David Lloyd George.
- The Walsall Constituency Labour Party re-selected 41-year-old trade unionist Lothian Small who had been their candidate in 1924. He came from Glasgow where he attended the University. During World War I, Small served as an officer with the South Staffordshire Regiment. He had also contested Exeter at the 1923 general election.

== Campaign ==
The confidence within Liberal Party ranks was not high following the 1924 general election when they were reduced to just 40 MPs. Among the defeated was their leader H.H. Asquith. Lloyd George had been elected the Chairman of the Liberal Parliamentary party. On 21 February, although suffering illness, Lloyd George spoke at Walsall Town Hall in front of 2,500 people, in support of Macnamara.

== Result ==
The result was almost identical to the result at the 1924 general election, with little change in the vote share of the three parties;

Walsall by-election, 1925
Party	Candidate	Votes	%	±%
Unionist	William Preston	14,793	38.2	+0.3
Liberal	Thomas James Macnamara	12,300	31.8	0.0
Labour	Lothian Small	11,610	30.0	+1.3
Majority		2,493	6.4	+0.3
Turnout		38,703	83.4	
Unionist hold		Swing	+0.1	

== Aftermath ==
Preston was only a member of the House of Commons for one term. At the 1929 general election there was a swing to Labour, and he was defeated by that party's candidate;

General election 1929: Walsall
Party	Candidate	Votes	%	±%
Labour	John James McShane	20,524	39.6	+9.6
Unionist	William Preston	15,818	30.6	−7.6
Liberal	Thomas James Macnamara	15,425	29.8	−2.0
Majority		4,706	9.0	N/A
Turnout		51,767	85.9	+2.5
Labour gain from Unionist		Swing	+8.6	
