= John McShane =

John McShane may refer to:

- John A. McShane (1850–1923), United States Representative from Nebraska
- John James McShane (1882–1972), British Member of Parliament
- Jon McShane (born 1991), Scottish footballer
