= Frank James (disambiguation) =

Frank James (1843–1915) was a Confederate soldier, outlaw, and older brother of Jesse James.

Frank James may also refer to:

- Frank A. James III (born 1953), American theologian and academic administrator
- Frank B. James (1912–2004), American general in the United States Air Force
- Frank Cyril James (1903–1973), Canadian academic and principal of McGill University
- Frank James (MP) (1821–1924), British businessman and politician
- Frank James (racing driver) (born 1938), American racing driver
- Frank Linsly James (1851–1890), English explorer
- Frank Robert James (born 1959), perpetrator of the 2022 New York City Subway attack
- W. Frank James (1873–1945), American soldier and politician from Michigan
- Frank "Springback" James, American blues and boogie-woogie pianist, singer, and songwriter

== See also ==
- Francis James (disambiguation)
