= Forster baronets of Lysways Hall (1874) =

Escutcheon of the Forster baronets of Lysways Hall

The Forster baronetcy of Lysways Hall, Longdon, Staffordshire, was created in the Baronetage of the United Kingdom on 17 March 1874 for Charles Forster, Member of Parliament for Walsall from 1852 to 1891, son of the banker Charles Smith Forster.

The title became extinct on the death of the 3rd baronet in 1930.

=== Forster of Lysways Hall (1874) ===
- Sir Charles Forster, 1st Baronet (1815–1891)
- Sir Charles Forster, 2nd Baronet (1841–1914)
- Sir Francis Villiers Forster, 3rd Baronet (1850–1930), left no heir.
