= Carlsville, Wisconsin =

- Unincorporated community
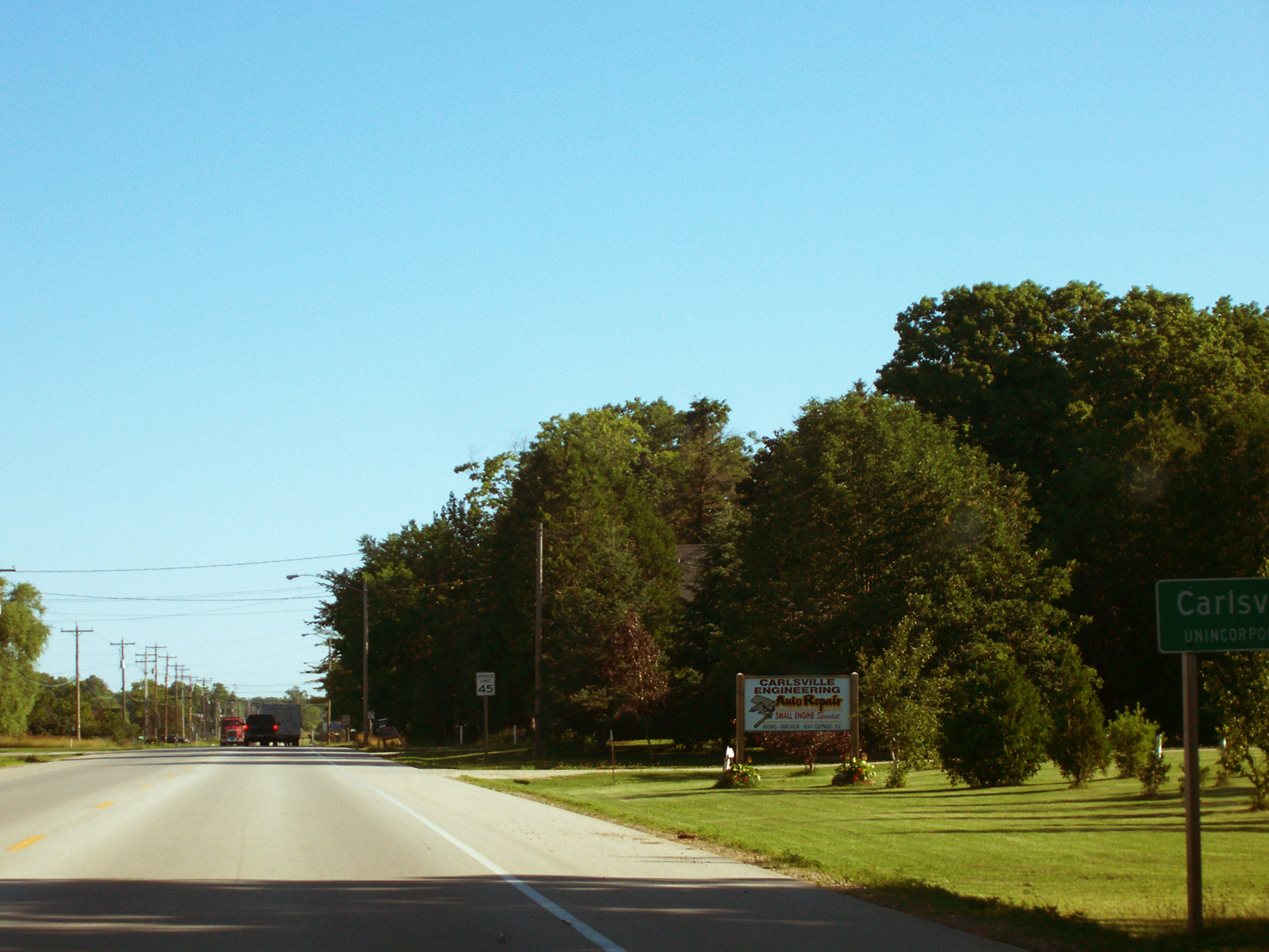
- Southern border of Carlsville from Wisconsin Highway 42

- Location within the state of Wisconsin
- Coordinates: 44.9517°N 87.3368°W
- Country: United States
- State: Wisconsin
- County: Door
- Town: Egg Harbor
- Elevation: 732 ft (223 m)
- Time zone: UTC-6 (Central (CST))
  - Summer (DST): UTC-5 (CDT)
- Area code: 920
- GNIS feature ID: 1562721

Carlsville is an unincorporated community in Door County, within the town of Egg Harbor, Wisconsin, United States. It is on Wisconsin Highway 42 between Sturgeon Bay and Egg Harbor.

== History ==
Carlsville has been in existence since the 1860s and was originally named Karlsville due to the number of men named Karl who lived in the settlement; the name was later anglicized.
