= Sir Charles Forster, 1st Baronet =

English politician

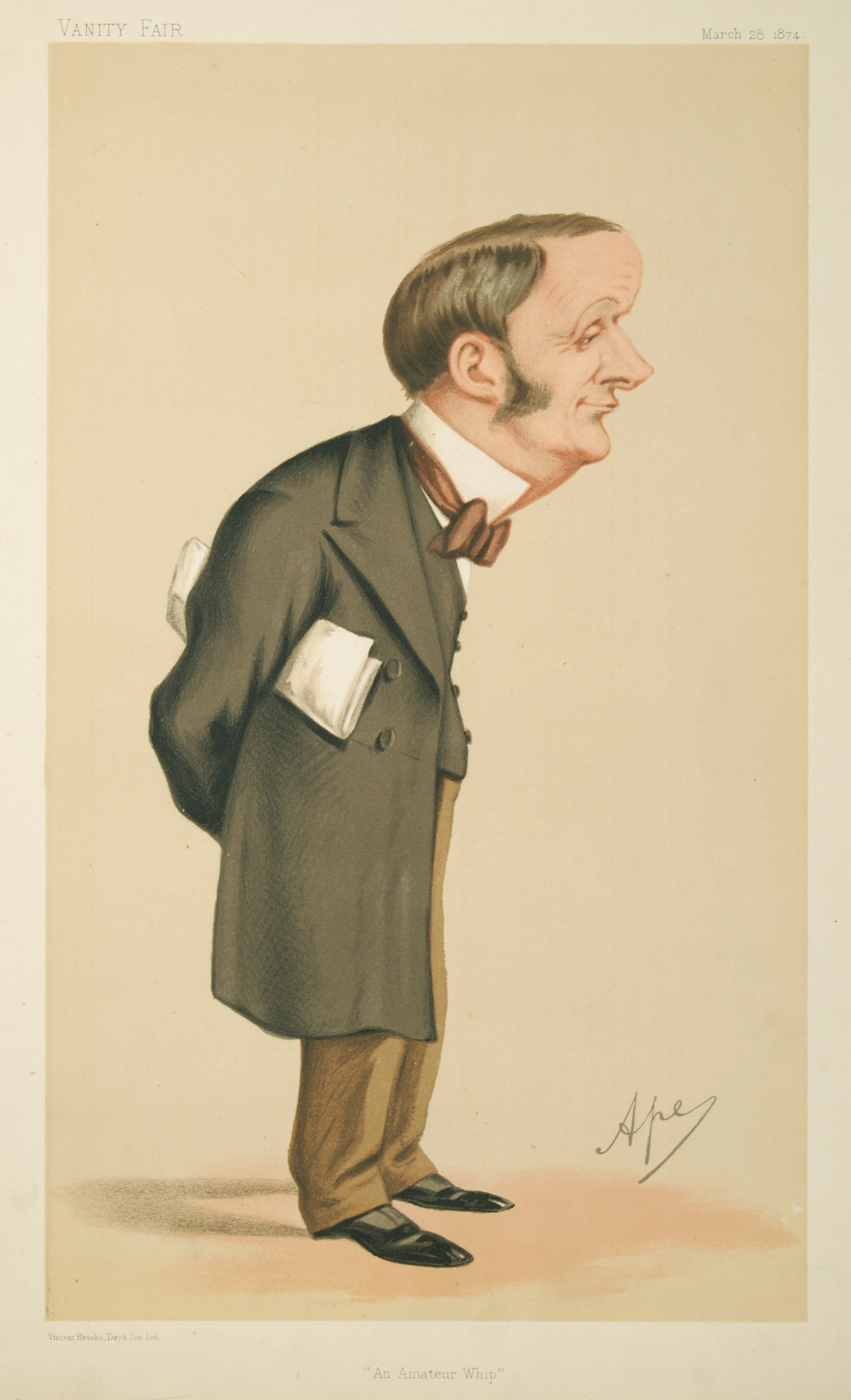
"An Amateur Whip" Forster as caricatured by Ape (Carlo Pellegrini) in Vanity Fair, March 1874

Sir Charles Forster, 1st Baronet (3 August 1815 – 26 July 1891) was an English Liberal politician who sat in the House of Commons from 1852 to 1891.

== Biography ==
Forster was born at Worcester, the only son of Charles Smith Forster of Lysways Hall, Rugeley, and his wife Elizabeth Emery. His father was a banker of Walsall and had been Member of Parliament for Walsall and High Sheriff of Staffordshire. Forster was educated at Worcester College, Oxford and called to the bar at Inner Temple in 1843. He was a Deputy Lieutenant and Justice of the Peace for Staffordshire.

Forster stood unsuccessfully for Walsall in 1847, but in 1852, he was returned unopposed as MP for Walsall. He lived at Lysways Hall, Staffordshire, and was created a baronet, of Lysways Hall, in March 1874. He remained member for Walsall until his death at the age of 75, in 1891. He made 210 contributions in the House of Commons. Forster supported women's suffrage in 1875, writing to the Manchester-based Women's Suffrage Journal that he "[regarded] [it] as a measure of progress, and one which cannot logically be resisted."

Forster married Frances Catherine Surtees of Newcastle upon Tyne in 1840. His son, Charles, succeeded to the baronetcy.

Parliament of the United Kingdom
Preceded by Edward Littleton	Member of Parliament for Walsall; 1852–1891	Succeeded by Edward Thomas Holden
Baronetage of the United Kingdom
New creation	Baronet (of Lysways Hall); 1874–1891	Succeeded by Charles Forster
