= Francis Finch (MP for Walsall) =

Francis Finch (died 1874) was a British Liberal Party politician. He was the Member of Parliament (MP) for Walsall 1837–1841 .

He died in 1874.

Parliament of the United Kingdom
Preceded by Charles Smith Forster	Member of Parliament for Walsall; 1837–1841	Succeeded by John Neilson Gladstone
