= Walsall (constituency) =

Parliamentary constituency in the United Kingdom, 1832–1955

- Former borough constituency for the House of Commons

1832–1955
- Seats: one

Walsall was a borough constituency centred on the town of Walsall in the West Midlands of England. It returned one Member of Parliament (MP) to the House of Commons of the Parliament of the United Kingdom, elected by the first past the post voting system.

== Boundaries ==
Throughout its existence, the seat included the entirety of the County Borough of Walsall. In 1955, it was split into Walsall North and Walsall South

== Members of Parliament ==
| Election | Member | Party |
|---|---|---|
| 1832 | Charles Smith Forster | Tory |
| 1834 | Charles Smith Forster | Conservative |
| 1837 | Francis Finch | Radical |
| February 1841 | John Neilson Gladstone | Conservative |
| June 1841 | Robert Scott | Whig |
| 1847 | Edward Littleton | Whig |
| 1852 | Sir Charles Forster | Radical |
| 1859 | Sir Charles Forster | Liberal |
| 1891 by-election | Edward Thomas Holden | Liberal |
| 1892 | Frank James | Conservative |
| 1893 by-election | Sir Arthur Hayter | Liberal |
| 1895 | Sydney Gedge | Conservative |
| 1900 | Sir Arthur Hayter | Liberal |
| 1906 | Edward Marten Dunne | Liberal |
| January 1910 | Sir Richard Cooper | Conservative |
| 1918 | Sir Richard Cooper | National |
| 1922 | Pat Collins | Liberal |
| 1924 | William Preston | Conservative |
| 1925 by-election | William Preston | Conservative |
| 1929 | John James McShane | Labour |
| 1931 | Joseph Leckie | Liberal |
| 1935 | Joseph Leckie | Liberal National |
| 1938 by-election | Sir George Schuster | Liberal National |
| 1945 | William Wells | Labour |
| 1955 | constituency abolished: see Walsall North and Walsall South | |

== Elections ==
=== Elections in the 1830s ===
General election 1832: Walsall
| Party | Candidate | Votes | % |
|---|---|---|---|
| Tory | Charles Smith Forster | 304 | 56.8 |
| Radical | George de Bosco Attwood | 231 | 43.2 |
| Majority | | 73 | 13.6 |
| Turnout | | 535 | 89.6 |
| Registered electors | | 597 | |
| Tory win (new seat) | | | |

General election 1835: Walsall
| Party | Candidate | Votes | % |
|---|---|---|---|
| Conservative | Charles Smith Forster | Unopposed | |
| Registered electors | | 578 | |
| Conservative hold | | | |

General election 1837: Walsall
| Party | Candidate | Votes | % |
|---|---|---|---|
| Radical | Francis Finch | 316 | 51.6 |
| Conservative | Charles Smith Forster | 296 | 48.4 |
| Majority | | 20 | 3.2 |
| Turnout | | 612 | 82.0 |
| Registered electors | | 746 | |
| Radical gain from Conservative | | | |

=== Elections in the 1840s ===
Finch resigned by accepting the office of Steward of the Chiltern Hundreds, causing a by-election.

By-election, 2 February 1841: Walsall
| Party | Candidate | Votes | % | ±% |
|---|---|---|---|---|
| Conservative | John Neilson Gladstone | 362 | 51.9 | +3.5 |
| Radical | John Benjamin Smith | 335 | 48.1 | −3.5 |
| Majority | | 27 | 3.8 | N/A |
| Turnout | | 697 | 86.3 | +4.3 |
| Registered electors | | 808 | | |
| Conservative gain from Radical | | Swing | +3.5 | |

General election 1841: Walsall
| Party | Candidate | Votes | % | ±% |
|---|---|---|---|---|
| Whig | Robert Wellbeloved Scott | 334 | 51.7 | +0.1 |
| Conservative | John Neilson Gladstone | 312 | 48.3 | −0.1 |
| Majority | | 22 | 3.4 | N/A |
| Turnout | | 646 | 80.0 | −2.0 |
| Registered electors | | 808 | | |
| Whig gain from Radical | | Swing | | |

General election 1847: Walsall
| Party | Candidate | Votes | % | ±% |
|---|---|---|---|---|
| Whig | Edward Littleton | 289 | 41.6 | −10.1 |
| Radical | Charles Forster | 282 | 40.6 | N/A |
| Conservative | William Henry Cooke | 124 | 17.8 | −30.5 |
| Majority | | 7 | 1.0 | −2.4 |
| Turnout | | 695 | 81.2 | +1.2 |
| Registered electors | | 856 | | |
| Whig hold | | Swing | +2.6 | |

=== Elections in the 1850s ===
General election 1852: Walsall
| Party | Candidate | Votes | % | ±% |
|---|---|---|---|---|
| Radical | Charles Forster | Unopposed | | |
| Registered electors | | 1,026 | | |
| Radical gain from Whig | | | | |

General election 1857: Walsall
| Party | Candidate | Votes | % | ±% |
|---|---|---|---|---|
| Radical | Charles Forster | Unopposed | | |
| Registered electors | | 1,188 | | |
| Radical hold | | | | |

General election 1859: Walsall
| Party | Candidate | Votes | % | ±% |
|---|---|---|---|---|
| Liberal | Charles Forster | 495 | 56.4 | N/A |
| Conservative | Charles Bagnall | 383 | 43.6 | New |
| Majority | | 112 | 12.8 | N/A |
| Turnout | | 878 | 80.4 | N/A |
| Registered electors | | 1,092 | | |
| Liberal hold | | Swing | N/A | |

=== Elections in the 1860s ===
General election 1865: Walsall
| Party | Candidate | Votes | % | ±% |
|---|---|---|---|---|
| Liberal | Charles Forster | Unopposed | | |
| Registered electors | | 1,296 | | |
| Liberal hold | | | | |

General election 1868: Walsall
| Party | Candidate | Votes | % | ±% |
|---|---|---|---|---|
| Liberal | Charles Forster | Unopposed | | |
| Registered electors | | 6,047 | | |
| Liberal hold | | | | |

=== Elections in the 1870s ===
General election 1874: Walsall
| Party | Candidate | Votes | % | ±% |
|---|---|---|---|---|
| Liberal | Charles Forster | 3,364 | 66.0 | N/A |
| Conservative | William Morrison Bell | 1,731 | 34.0 | New |
| Majority | | 1,633 | 32.0 | N/A |
| Turnout | | 5,095 | 58.7 | N/A |
| Registered electors | | 8,684 | | |
| Liberal hold | | | | |

=== Elections in the 1880s ===
General election 1880: Walsall
| Party | Candidate | Votes | % | ±% |
|---|---|---|---|---|
| Liberal | Charles Forster | Unopposed | | |
| Registered electors | | 9,537 | | |
| Liberal hold | | | | |

General election 1885: Walsall
| Party | Candidate | Votes | % | ±% |
|---|---|---|---|---|
| Liberal | Charles Forster | 5,112 | 59.8 | N/A |
| Conservative | Frank James | 3,435 | 40.2 | New |
| Majority | | 1,677 | 19.6 | N/A |
| Turnout | | 8,547 | 79.6 | N/A |
| Registered electors | | 10,742 | | |
| Liberal hold | | Swing | N/A | |

General election 1886: Walsall
| Party | Candidate | Votes | % | ±% |
|---|---|---|---|---|
| Liberal | Charles Forster | Unopposed | | |
| Liberal hold | | | | |

=== Elections in the 1890s ===
Forster's death caused a by-election.

By-election, 12 Aug 1891: Walsall
| Party | Candidate | Votes | % | ±% |
|---|---|---|---|---|
| Liberal | Edward Holden | 4,899 | 52.9 | N/A |
| Conservative | Frank James | 4,360 | 47.1 | New |
| Majority | | 539 | 5.8 | N/A |
| Turnout | | 9,259 | 79.1 | N/A |
| Registered electors | | 11,712 | | |
| Liberal hold | | Swing | N/A | |

General election 1892: Walsall
| Party | Candidate | Votes | % | ±% |
|---|---|---|---|---|
| Conservative | Frank James | 5,226 | 51.2 | N/A |
| Liberal | Edward Holden | 4,989 | 48.8 | N/A |
| Majority | | 237 | 2.4 | N/A |
| Turnout | | 10,215 | 85.7 | N/A |
| Registered electors | | 11,915 | | |
| Conservative gain from Liberal | | Swing | N/A | |

The election was declared void on petition.

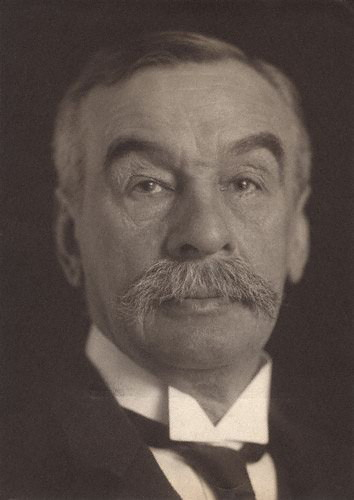
Charles Ritchie

By-election, 9 Feb 1893: Walsall
| Party | Candidate | Votes | % | ±% |
|---|---|---|---|---|
| Liberal | Arthur Hayter | 5,235 | 50.4 | +1.6 |
| Conservative | Charles Ritchie | 5,156 | 49.6 | −1.6 |
| Majority | | 79 | 0.8 | N/A |
| Turnout | | 10,391 | 87.8 | +2.1 |
| Registered electors | | 11,838 | | |
| Liberal gain from Conservative | | Swing | +1.6 | |

Sydney Gedge

General election 1895: Walsall
| Party | Candidate | Votes | % | ±% |
|---|---|---|---|---|
| Conservative | Sydney Gedge | 5,145 | 51.6 | +0.4 |
| Liberal | Arthur Hayter | 4,828 | 48.4 | −0.4 |
| Majority | | 317 | 3.2 | +0.8 |
| Turnout | | 9,973 | 90.5 | +4.8 |
| Registered electors | | 11,015 | | |
| Conservative hold | | Swing | +0.4 | |

=== Elections in the 1900s ===
Arthur Hayter

General election 1900: Walsall
| Party | Candidate | Votes | % | ±% |
|---|---|---|---|---|
| Liberal | Arthur Hayter | 5,610 | 51.5 | +3.1 |
| Conservative | Sydney Gedge | 5,285 | 48.5 | −3.1 |
| Majority | | 325 | 3.0 | N/A |
| Turnout | | 10,895 | 84.8 | −5.7 |
| Registered electors | | 12,851 | | |
| Liberal gain from Conservative | | Swing | +3.1 | |

General election 1906: Walsall
| Party | Candidate | Votes | % | ±% |
|---|---|---|---|---|
| Liberal | Edward Dunne | 7,092 | 54.6 | +3.1 |
| Conservative | Bernall Bagshawe | 5,893 | 45.4 | −3.1 |
| Majority | | 1,199 | 9.2 | +6.2 |
| Turnout | | 12,985 | 91.9 | +7.1 |
| Registered electors | | 14,127 | | |
| Liberal hold | | Swing | +3.1 | |

=== Elections in the 1910s ===
General election January 1910: Walsall
| Party | Candidate | Votes | % | ±% |
|---|---|---|---|---|
| Conservative | Richard Cooper | 7,290 | 51.9 | +6.5 |
| Liberal | Edward Dunne | 6,745 | 48.1 | −6.5 |
| Majority | | 545 | 3.8 | N/A |
| Turnout | | 14,035 | 95.4 | +3.5 |
| Registered electors | | 14,713 | | |
| Conservative gain from Liberal | | Swing | +6.5 | |

General election December 1910: Walsall
| Party | Candidate | Votes | % | ±% |
|---|---|---|---|---|
| Conservative | Richard Cooper | 7,174 | 52.9 | +1.0 |
| Liberal | John Morgan | 6,385 | 47.1 | −1.0 |
| Majority | | 789 | 5.8 | +2.0 |
| Turnout | | 13,559 | 92.2 | −3.2 |
| Registered electors | | 14,713 | | |
| Conservative hold | | Swing | +1.0 | |

General Election 1914–15: Another General Election was required to take place before the end of 1915. The political parties had been making preparations for an election to take place and by July 1914, the following candidates had been selected;

- Unionist: Richard Cooper
- Liberal: William Henry Brown

W.H. Brown

General election 1918: Walsall
| Party | Candidate | Votes | % | ±% |
|---|---|---|---|---|
| National | Richard Cooper | 14,491 | 52.3 | −0.6 |
| Labour | Joseph Thickett | 8,336 | 30.0 | New |
| Liberal | William Henry Brown | 4,914 | 17.7 | −29.4 |
| Majority | | 6,155 | 22.3 | N/A |
| Turnout | | 27,741 | 64.7 | −27.5 |
| National gain from Unionist | | Swing | | |

- Cooper founded the National Party and had the support of the local Unionist Association. However, his candidature was not supported by Unionist party HQ or the Coalition Government.

=== Elections in the 1920s ===
Pat Collins

General election 1922: Walsall
| Party | Candidate | Votes | % | ±% |
|---|---|---|---|---|
| Liberal | Pat Collins | 14,674 | 38.6 | +20.9 |
| Unionist | Alice Cooper | 14,349 | 37.8 | −14.5 |
| Labour | Robert Dennison | 8,946 | 23.6 | −6.4 |
| Majority | | 325 | 0.8 | N/A |
| Turnout | | 37,969 | | |
| Liberal gain from National | | Swing | +17.7 | |

General election 6 December 1923: Walsall
| Party | Candidate | Votes | % | ±% |
|---|---|---|---|---|
| Liberal | Pat Collins | 16,304 | 43.5 | +4.9 |
| Unionist | Sydney Kersland Lewis | 14,141 | 37.8 | 0.0 |
| Labour | Arthur Carr Osburn | 7,007 | 18.7 | −4.9 |
| Majority | | 2,163 | 5.7 | +4.9 |
| Turnout | | 37,452 | 82.6 | |
| Liberal hold | | Swing | -2.4 | |

General election 1924: Walsall
| Party | Candidate | Votes | % | ±% |
|---|---|---|---|---|
| Unionist | William Preston | 15,168 | 37.9 | +0.1 |
| Liberal | Pat Collins | 12,734 | 31.8 | −11.7 |
| Labour | Lothian Small | 11,474 | 28.7 | +10.0 |
| Independent | J J Lynch | 622 | 1.6 | New |
| Majority | | 2,434 | 6.1 | N/A |
| Turnout | | 39,998 | 83.0 | +0.4 |
| Unionist gain from Liberal | | Swing | | |

1925 Walsall by-election
| Party | Candidate | Votes | % | ±% |
|---|---|---|---|---|
| Unionist | William Preston | 14,793 | 38.2 | +0.3 |
| Liberal | Thomas Macnamara | 12,300 | 31.8 | 0.0 |
| Labour | Lothian Small | 11,610 | 30.0 | +1.3 |
| Majority | | 2,493 | 6.4 | +0.3 |
| Turnout | | 38,703 | 83.4 | |
| Unionist hold | | Swing | +0.1 | |

General election 1929: Walsall
| Party | Candidate | Votes | % | ±% |
|---|---|---|---|---|
| Labour | John McShane | 20,524 | 39.6 | +9.6 |
| Unionist | William Preston | 15,818 | 30.6 | −7.6 |
| Liberal | Thomas Macnamara | 15,425 | 29.8 | −2.0 |
| Majority | | 4,706 | 9.0 | N/A |
| Turnout | | 51,767 | 85.9 | +2.9 |
| Labour gain from Unionist | | Swing | +8.6 | |

=== Elections in the 1930s ===
General election 1931: Walsall
| Party | Candidate | Votes | % | ±% |
|---|---|---|---|---|
| Liberal | Joseph Leckie | 30,507 | 56.0 | +26.2 |
| Labour | John McShane | 23,952 | 44.0 | +4.4 |
| Majority | | 6,555 | 12.0 | N/A |
| Turnout | | 54,459 | 86.3 | +0.4 |
| Liberal gain from Labour | | Swing | +10.9 | |

- Conservative candidate, William J Talbot, withdrew.

General election 1935: Walsall
| Party | Candidate | Votes | % | ±% |
|---|---|---|---|---|
| National Liberal | Joseph Leckie | 28,563 | 57.5 | +1.5 |
| Labour | William Graham | 19,594 | 39.5 | −4.5 |
| Christian Socialist | J A Harper | 1,480 | 3.0 | New |
| Majority | | 8,959 | 18.0 | +6.0 |
| Turnout | | 49,637 | 75.3 | −11.0 |
| National Liberal hold | | Swing | +3.0 | |

1938 Walsall by-election
| Party | Candidate | Votes | % | ±% |
|---|---|---|---|---|
| National Liberal | George Schuster | 28,720 | 57.1 | −0.4 |
| Labour | George Jeger | 21,562 | 42.9 | +3.4 |
| Majority | | 7,158 | 14.2 | −3.8 |
| Turnout | | 50,282 | 75.9 | +0.6 |
| National Liberal hold | | Swing | -0.4 | |

=== Elections in the 1940s ===
General Election 1939–40:

Another General Election was required to take place before the end of 1940. The political parties had been making preparations for an election and by the end of the Autumn of 1939, the following candidates had been selected;

- Liberal National: George Schuster
- Labour: A J Stanley

General election 1945: Walsall
| Party | Candidate | Votes | % | ±% |
|---|---|---|---|---|
| Labour | William Wells | 28,324 | 53.9 | +14.4 |
| National Liberal | George Schuster | 24,197 | 46.1 | −11.4 |
| Majority | | 4,127 | 7.8 | N/A |
| Turnout | | 52,521 | 76.2 | +0.9 |
| Labour gain from National Liberal | | Swing | | |

=== Elections in the 1950s ===
General election 1950: Walsall
| Party | Candidate | Votes | % | ±% |
|---|---|---|---|---|
| Labour | William Wells | 36,483 | 56.0 | +2.1 |
| National Liberal | John Barlow | 28,700 | 44.0 | −2.1 |
| Majority | | 7,783 | 12.0 | +4.2 |
| Turnout | | 65,183 | 86.2 | +10.0 |
| Labour hold | | Swing | | |

General election 1951: Walsall
| Party | Candidate | Votes | % | ±% |
|---|---|---|---|---|
| Labour | William Wells | 33,556 | 52.3 | −3.7 |
| Conservative | Frank Roper | 23,083 | 36.0 | −8.0 |
| Liberal | Barbara Lewis | 7,517 | 11.7 | New |
| Majority | | 10,473 | 16.3 | +4.3 |
| Turnout | | 64,156 | 83.1 | −3.1 |
| Labour hold | | Swing | | |

== Sources ==
- Craig, F. W. S. (1983) [1969]. British parliamentary election results 1918-1949 (3rd ed.). Chichester: Parliamentary Research Services. ISBN 0-900178-06-X.
- Leigh Rayment's Historical List of MPs – Constituencies beginning with "W" (part 1)
