= Edward Thomas Holden =

British politician

- Born: September 10, 1831
- Died: 13 November 1926 (aged 95)
- Known for: MP

Sir Edward Thomas Holden (10 September 1831 – 13 November 1926) was a British businessman and Liberal Party politician, who was briefly Member of Parliament (MP) for Walsall.

== Biography ==
Holden was born in Walsall, Staffordshire, and was the son of Edward Holden and his wife Elizabeth née Mason of New York City. Following a private education, he joined the Walsall firm of tanners and curriers founded by his father, whom he eventually succeeded as its head. In 1854, he married Caroline Glass of Edinburgh. They made their home at Glenelg, Great Barr, and had one son.

Holden was a member of Walsall Borough Council for more than sixty years. He was the mayor of Walsall on three occasions: in 1870/71, 1871/72 and 1904/05. He was also a member of the Walsall School Board and the Walsall Board of Guardians, and a justice of the peace for the borough of Walsall and the county of Staffordshire.

In July 1891, Walsall's sitting Liberal member of parliament, Sir Charles Forster, died suddenly. Holden, who was a close friend of the late MP and president of the Walsall Liberal Association, was unanimously adopted to contest the resulting by-election as the Liberal candidate. Holden campaigned on a platform of opposing the incumbent Conservative government, and argued in favour of Irish Home Rule, "one man – one vote" and the introduction of elected parish councils. He also had the support of the local temperance movement, as he was in favour of the closure of licensed premises on Sundays. His Conservative opponent was Frank James, who was supported by the Licensed Vintners National Defence League.

The by-election was held on 11 August: Holden held the seat for the Liberals with a majority of 539 votes. It was believed that he owed his success in part to the presence of some thousand Irish voters in the constituency.

Holden's membership of the Commons was brief: a general election was held in 1892, and Holden's opponent of the previous year, Frank James, recovered the seat for the Conservatives. Although James was subsequently unseated on petition in August 1892 due to breaches of Corrupt Practices Act 1883, Holden did not choose to exercise his right to claim the seat. Indeed, he stated that he would "not again offer himself for Walsall or any other place". However, he continued to be involved in Walsall politics at a municipal level. He was knighted in 1907.

In 1916, Holden was a signatory of a successful application to the charity commission by Ruiton Congregational Chapel in Upper Gornal in the Parish of Sedgley in the then county of Stafford. It is understood that he was a member of the church.

Holden died in November 1926, aged 95.

Holden's younger brother, James Alexander Holden (1835–1887) emigrated to South Australia and founded a family saddlery business which later manufactured the Holden automobile.

Parliament of the United Kingdom
Preceded by Sir Charles Forster, Bt.	Member of Parliament for Walsall; 1891 – 1892	Succeeded by Frank James
