= Murphy Farms Number 1 =

- U.S. National Register of Historic Places
- Location: 7195, 7199, 7203, 7207, 7212 and 7213 Horseshoe Bay Rd. Egg Harbor, Wisconsin
- Architect: Henry Anschutz
- Architectural style: Colonial Revival
- NRHP reference No.: 12000314
- Added to NRHP: May 24, 2012

Murphy Farms Number 1 is located in the Town of Egg Harbor, Wisconsin.

== History ==
Frank E. Murphy was a prominent philanthropist, businessman and politician in Green Bay, Wisconsin. During the early 20th Century, he began developing a pair of farms, with his nephew, Elbridge.

Originally, the Murphys bred and showcased Holstein Friesian cattle at the farm. Frank Murphy would later focus on Dairy and fruit farming.

The farm was added to the State Register of Historic Places in 2011 and to the National Register of Historic Places the following year.
