= Frances James =

Frances James may refer to:

- Frances James (ecologist) (born 1930), American ecologist
- Frances James (soprano) (1903–1988), Canadian soprano
- Frances James (Winners & Losers), fictional character from the Australian drama series Winners & Losers

== See also ==
- Francis James (disambiguation)
