= Hat Island (Wisconsin) =

Island in Wisconsin, United Statss

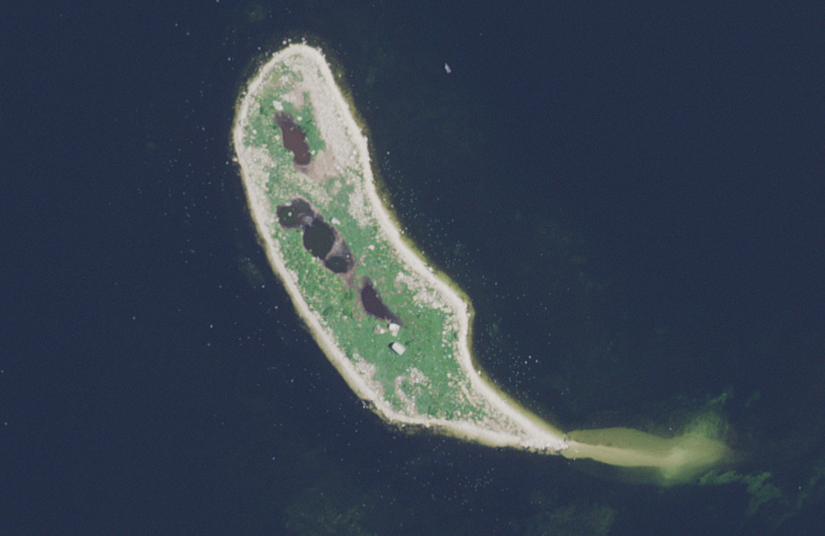

- Location within Wisconsin

Geography
- Location: Green Bay
- Coordinates: 45°06′08″N 087°19′04″W
- Area: 8 acres (3.2 ha)
- Highest elevation: 581 ft (177.1 m)

Administration
- United States
- State: Wisconsin
- County: Door County
- Town: Gibraltar

Hat Island is an island in Green Bay in Door County, Wisconsin. The island is part of the Town of Egg Harbor, and lies offshore from the community of Juddville. Hat Island is privately owned.

== Diagram ==
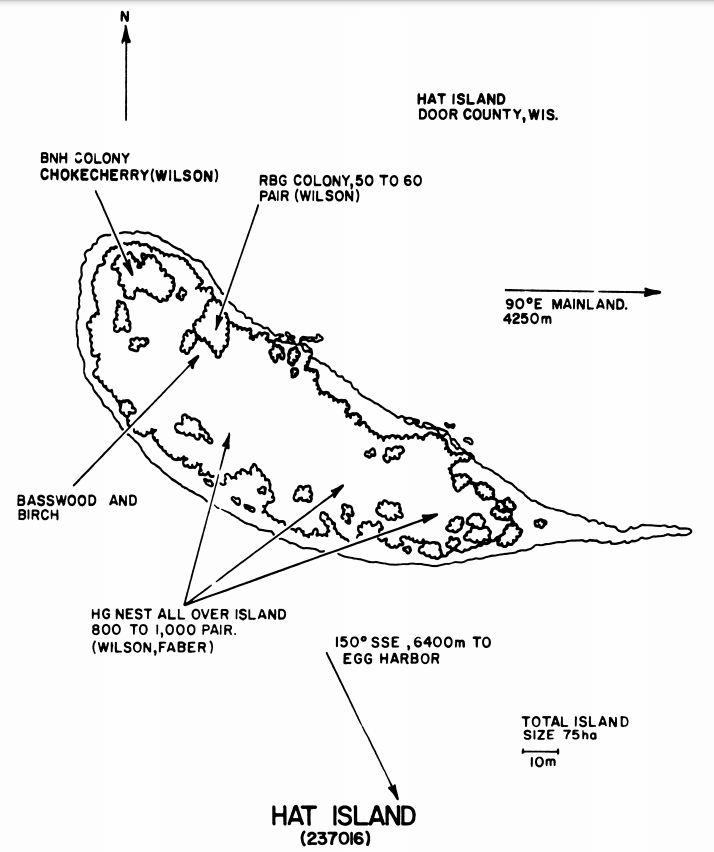
Hat Island diagram drawn in the 1970s.
