= Franklin Murphy =

Franklin Murphy may refer to:

- Franklin Murphy (governor) (1846–1920), 31st Governor of New Jersey
- Franklin David Murphy (1916–1994), University of California official

== See also ==
- Frank Murphy (disambiguation)
