= Joseph Thickett =

British political figure

Joseph Thickett (14 July 1865 – 7 November 1938) was a British trade unionist and political activist.

Born in Wolverhampton, Thickett began working at a young age at a forge in Wednesbury. In 1887, he moved to work on the railways, becoming a porter at Bescot railway station, then a signalman at Pleck Junction. He joined the Amalgamated Society of Railway Servants (ASRS), serving on its national executive in 1905. He supported the ASRS's merger into the National Union of Railwaymen in 1913, becoming president of the union's Walsall branch, and representing the union on the Walsall Trades Council. From 1906, he was president of the trades council, and so was a leading figure in the successful Black Country strike of 1913.

In 1913, Thickett was elected to Walsall Town Council, its first Labour Party member. He stood for Walsall at the 1918 UK general election, taking second place despite a lack of organisation, largely on the strength of his local popularity and strong speaking ability. In 1923, he became the first Labour Party Mayor of Walsall. He became an alderman in 1928, continuing following his retirement from work in 1930, until his death in 1938.
