= Charles Smith Forster =

English banker and Conservative politician

Charles Smith Forster (1786 – 17 November 1850) was an English banker and Conservative politician who represented Walsall in the 19th century.

Forster was born at Walsall, the son of Charles Forster and his wife Hannah Westley. He became a banker and Mayor of Walsall, before being elected the first MP for Walsall in the reformed parliament of 1832. In 1845 he was High Sheriff of Staffordshire.

Forster married Elizabeth Emery in 1813. His son Charles was also Member of Parliament for Walsall and became a baronet, of Lysways Hall

Parliament of the United Kingdom
| New constituency | Member of Parliament for Walsall; 1832–1837 | Succeeded by Francis Finch |
Honorary titles
| Preceded by Ralph Sneyd (1793–1870) | High Sheriff of Staffordshire; 1845–1846 | Succeeded by John Levett |
