= Bayshore Blufflands State Natural Area =

State Natural Area in Wisconsin

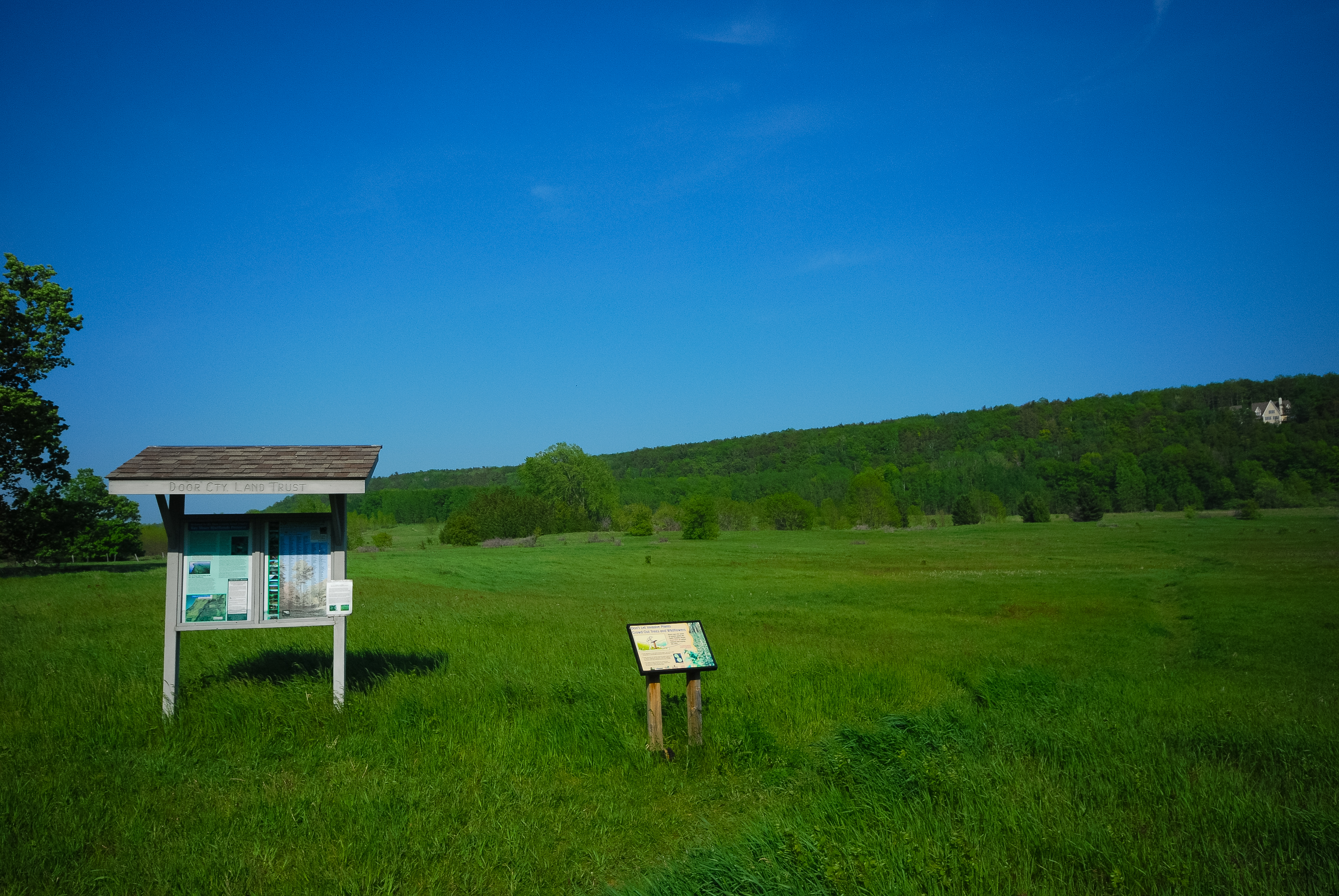
- Preserve kiosk
- Interactive map of Bayshore Blufflands State Natural Area
- Location: Door County, Wisconsin
- Coordinates: 44°56′5″N 87°23′25″W
- Area: 370 acres (150 ha)
- Established: 2002
- Owner: The Door County Land Trust and The Nature Conservancy
- Website: Official website

Bayshore Blufflands State Natural Area is a Wisconsin Department of Natural Resources-designated State Natural Area of significant note for its grand scenery, unusual geology, rare plant and animal species. Containing more than 7 miles (11 km) of the Niagara Escarpment, the Bayshore Blufflands is an ecologically complex site with a diversity of plant communities both above and below the escarpment and a series of seeps and springs at the base of the bluff's talus slopes.

== Location and access ==
The Bayshore Blufflands Preserve is located on the western shore of the Door Peninsula approximately 2 miles (3.2 km) west of Carlsville and 6 miles (9.7 km) north of Sturgeon Bay. There are parking areas at the east and west end of the property, and trails provide access into and through the site.

== Description ==
Rising 150–200 feet (45–60 m) above the low terrace of Green Bay, the steep carbonate cliffs and outcrops support numerous rare land snails including the cherrystone drop snail (Hendersonia occulta), a state-threatened species. Aspen, sugar maple, red oak, hemlock, and white cedar grow out of the talus affording complete shade to the escarpment maintaining the cool and damp conditions, which support a lush growth of mosses.

The unique site conditions also support such uncommon species as climbing fumitory, mountain maple, bulblet fern, common polypody, and fragile fern. Above the escarpment is a dry-mesic forest of red and white pine with red oak. The ground layer is dominated by round-leaved dogwood with northern bush honeysuckle, zig-zag goldenrod, big-leaved aster, and bracken fern. The site slowly grades into a richer, more mesic forest containing sugar maple, beech, and red oak with hemlock, and white pine. Also present is a wet-mesic forest of white cedar, big-tooth aspen, and black ash. Several white cedars reach impressive sizes here. Below the escarpment are seasonally flooded forests dominated by silver maple, and green ash with swamp white oak, American bladdernut, and great water-leaf.

The site contains many rare plants including dwarf lake iris (Iris lacustris). Other noteworthy species within the SNA are variegated horsetail (Equisetum variegatum), Hooker's orchid (Platanthera hookeri), long-spurred violet (Viola rostrata), and large-flowered ground-cherry (Leucophysalis grandiflora).

Rare animals include red-shouldered hawk (Buteo lineatus), Midwest Pleistocene vertigo (Vertigo hubrichti), Iowa Pleistocene vertigo (V. iowaensis) and Four-toed salamander (Hemidactylium scutatum). Significant portions of the Bayshore Blufflands are owned by the Door County Land Trust.

== Gallery ==
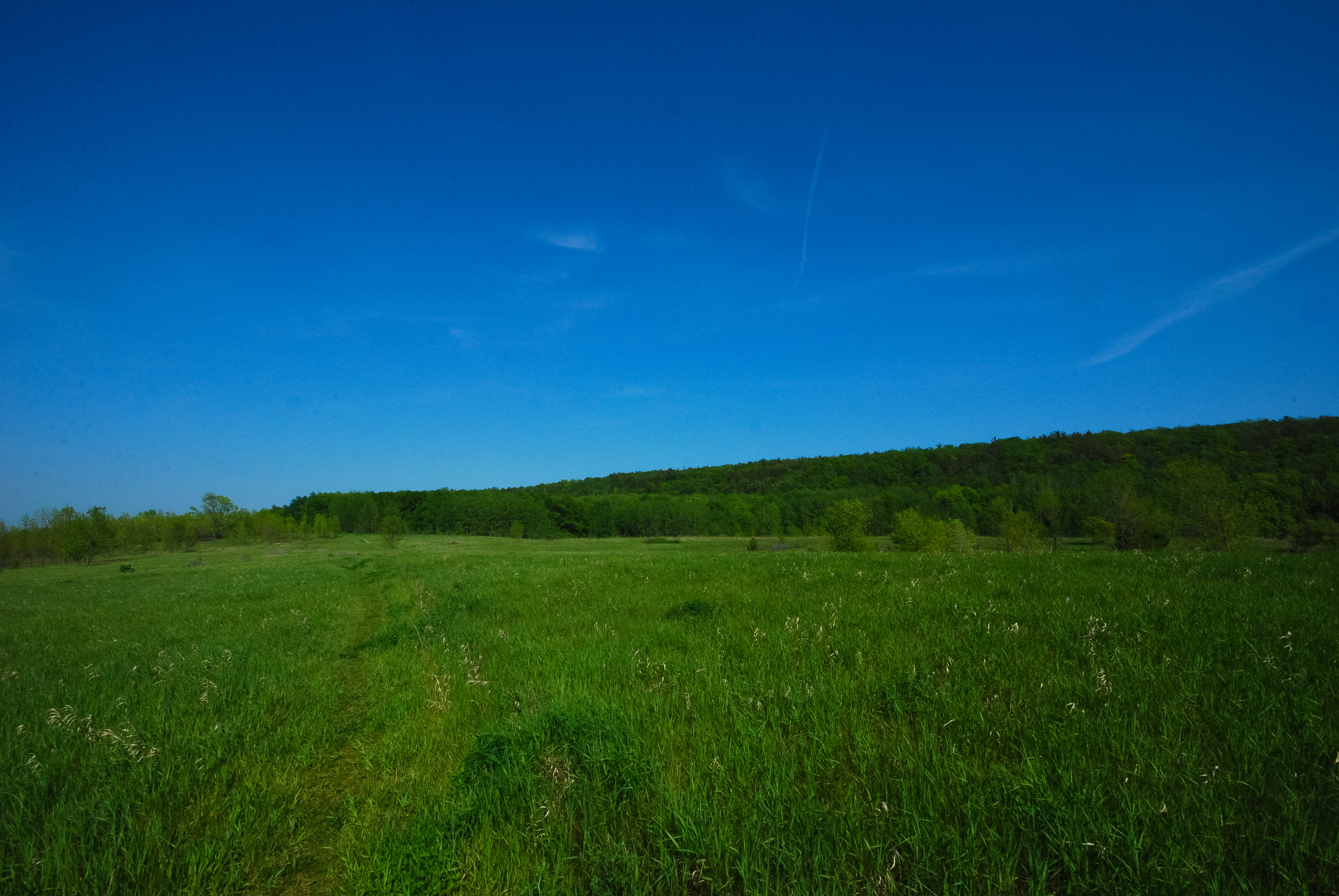
Escarpment

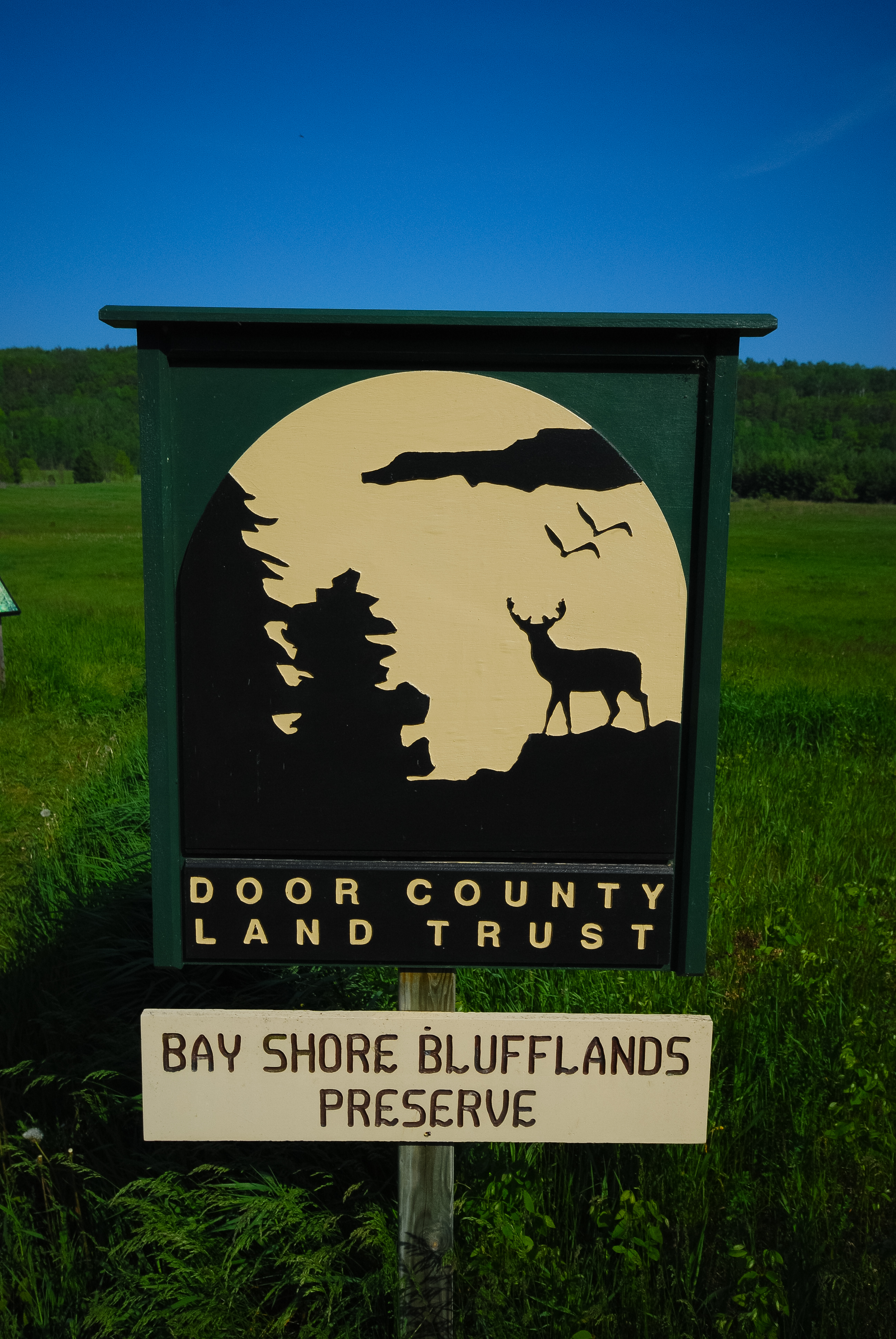
Sign

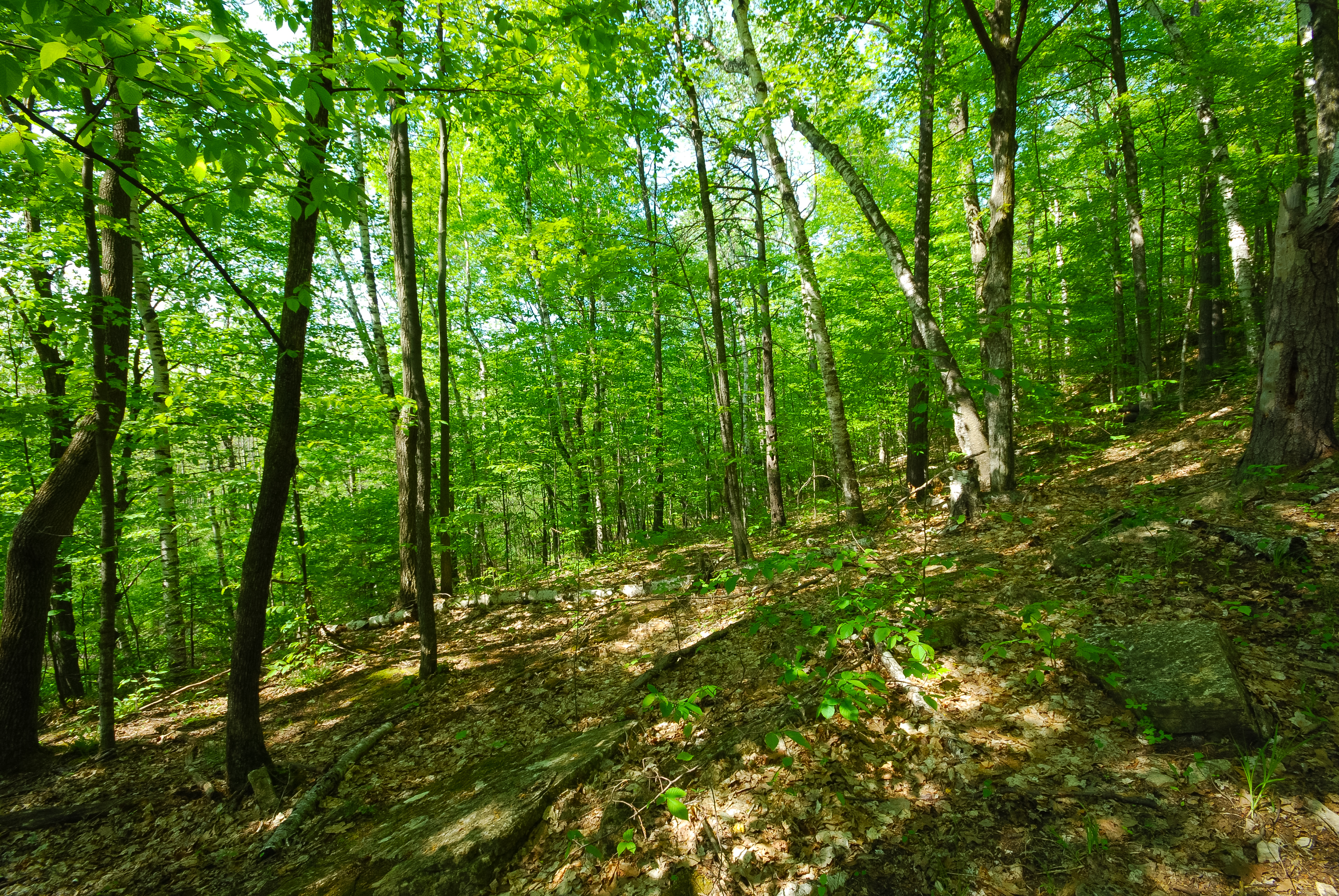
Slope

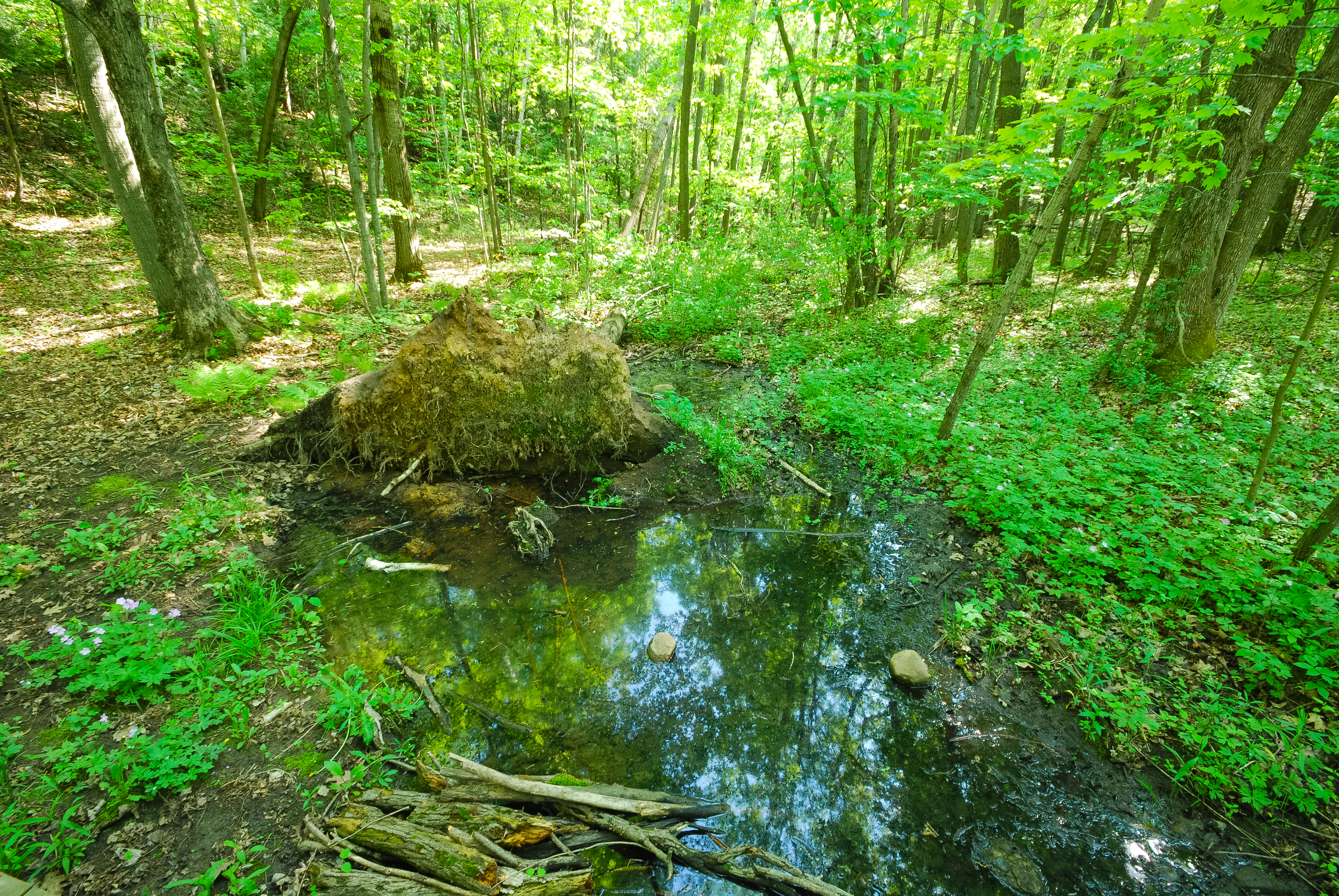
Wet area

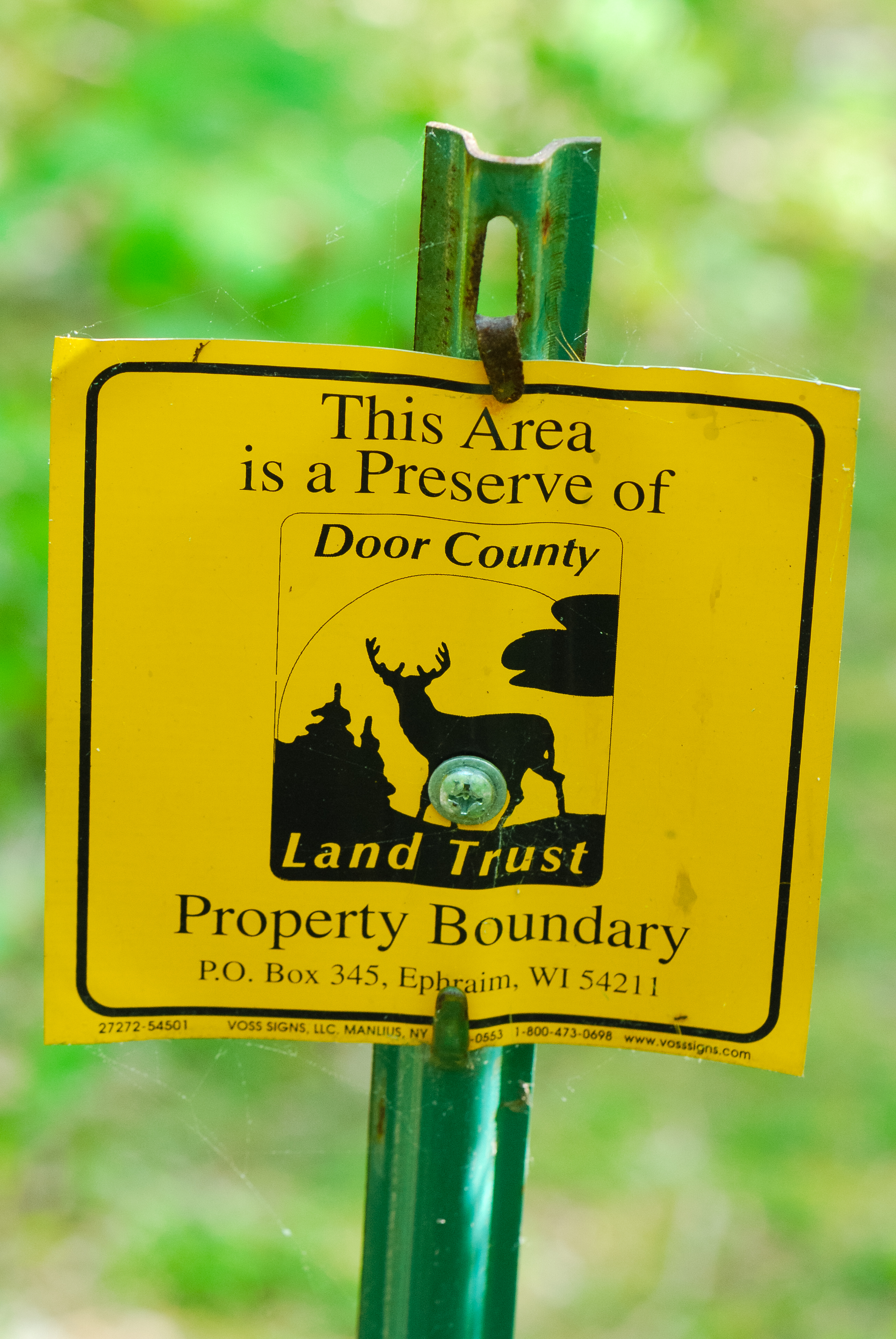
Boundary sign

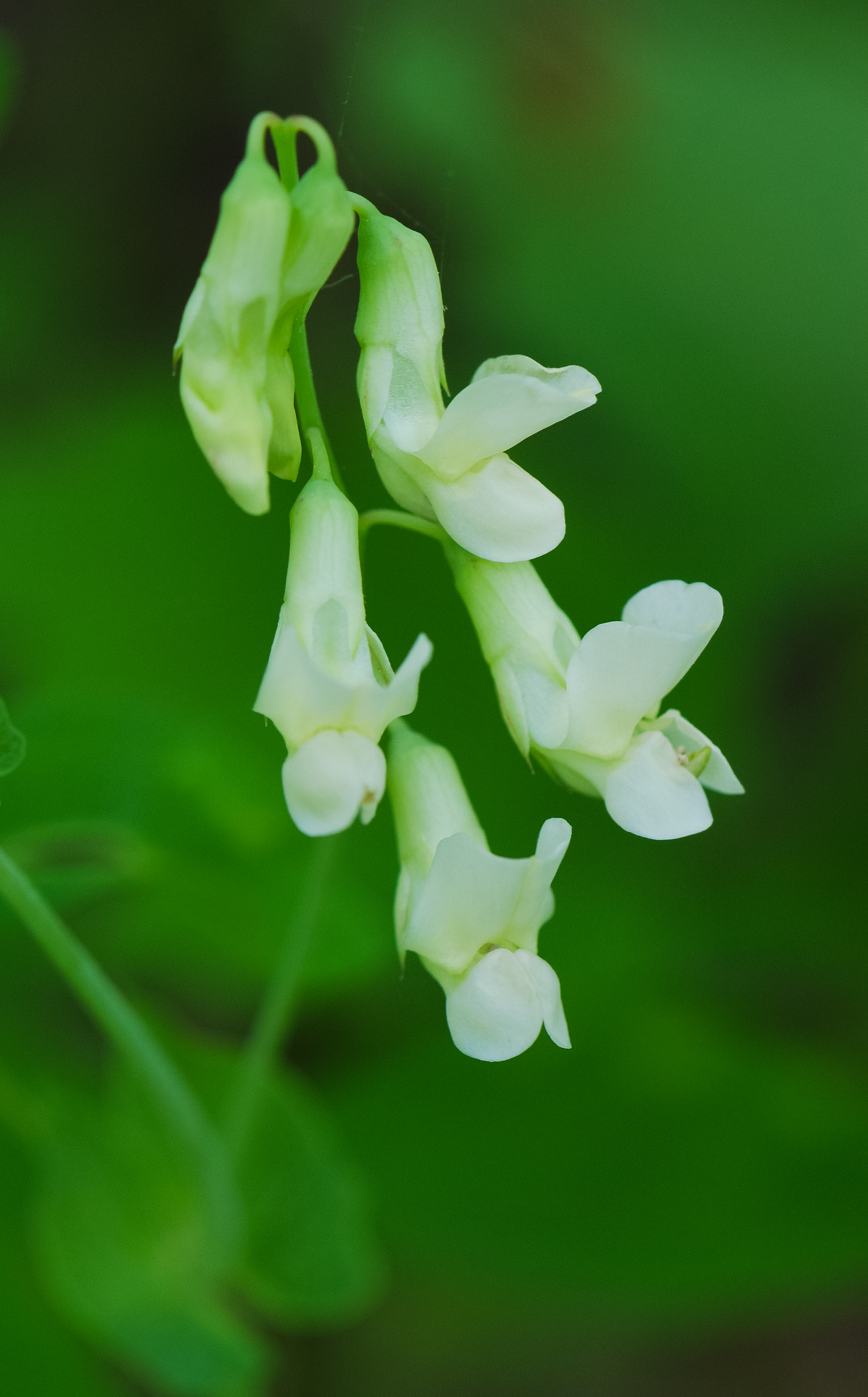
Lathyrus ochroleucus, cream pea

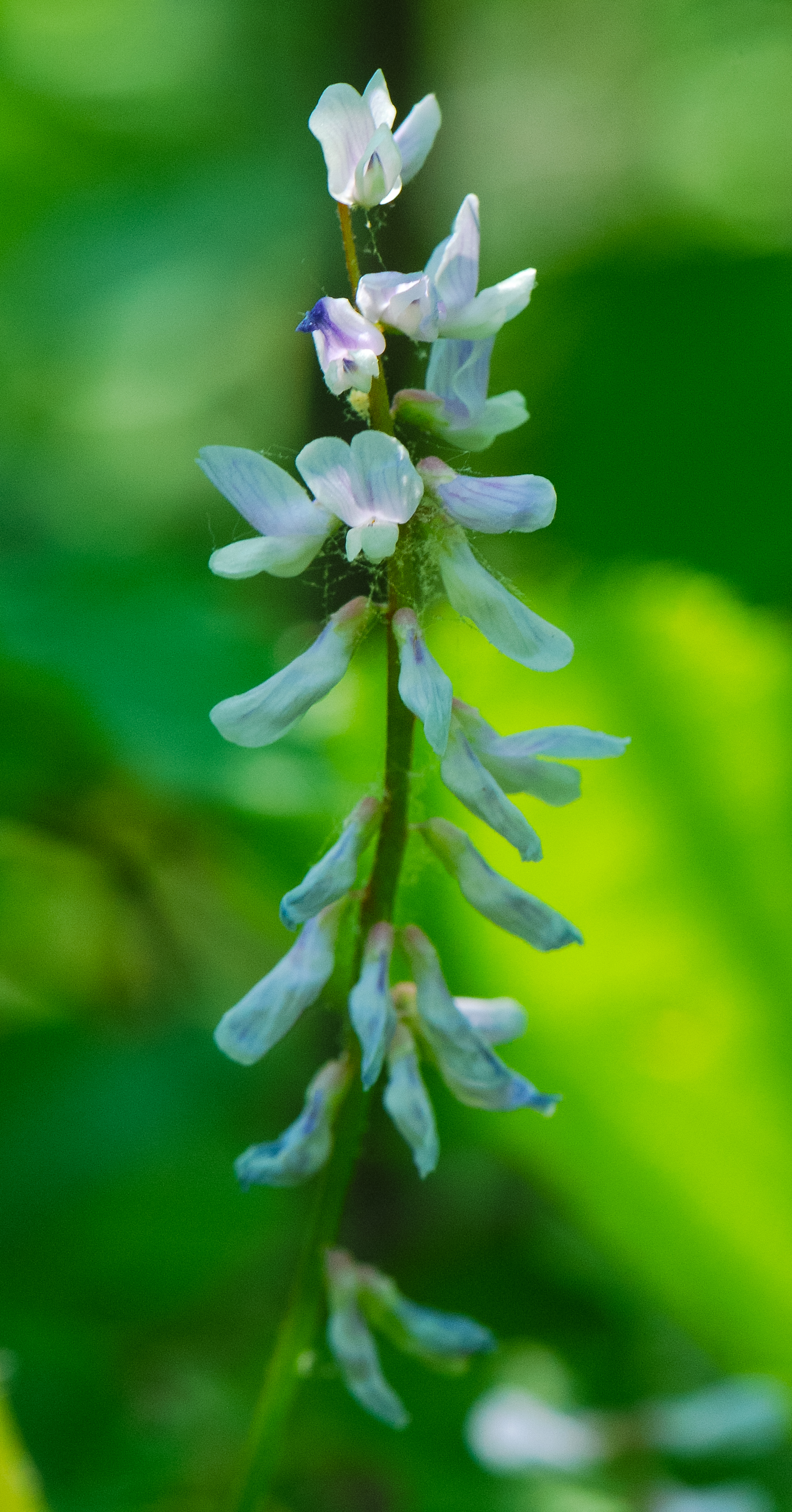
Vicia caroliniana, Carolina vetch
