= James Francis =

James Francis may refer to:

- James Francis (politician) (1819–1884), Australian colonial politician
- James B. Francis (1815–1892), British-American engineer
- James Francis (American football) (born 1968), former linebacker in the NFL
- Jim Francis (1910–2004), Australian rules footballer and coach
- James Francis, one of the members of the band Panic Lift

== See also ==
- Francis James (disambiguation)
- James Francis Murphy (disambiguation)
