= Joseph Leckie =

British politician (1866–1938)

Joseph Alexander Leckie (24 May 1866 – 9 August 1938) was a British Liberal, later Liberal National politician and leather manufacturer.

== Education and business life ==
Leckie was born in Govan in Glasgow, Scotland, the son of John and Isabella Leckie. He was educated at Glasgow Academy and Bellahouston Academy, Glasgow. Leckie joined his father's wholesale saddlery and leather goods manufacturing business, which had branches in Glasgow, London and Walsall. He travelled widely on the company's business in Europe, Canada, the US and Central America. He continued to work for the company until 1928. During this time he was a member and sometime president of Walsall Incorporated Chamber of Commerce. Leckie later became a member of the Council of the Federation of Chambers of Commerce of the British Empire. He married Jean Wightman, the daughter of a Walsall Justice of the Peace.

== Public life ==
Like most late Victorian businessmen, Leckie took an interest in public affairs. As early as 1898 he was chosen as Hon. Secretary to the Walsall Victoria Nursing Institution, and he took an active part in temperance, social and religious works. Presumably reflecting his Glasgow roots, Leckie was a Presbyterian. He served as president of the West Midland Federation of Free Churches and treasurer of the Federal Council of the Free Churches. He also served as president of the Walsall and District Band of Hope Union for some years. He was a chairman of the Walsall Chamber of Commerce in the early years of the 20th century.

== Local politics ==
Leckie first stood for election to Walsall Council in the Bridge Ward in 1903, describing himself as a Progressive candidate. He was defeated by a local solicitor. This was only a temporary setback, for in 1905 Leckie became a member of the Walsall Education Committee and was chairman of the committee from 1930 to 1937. He became a member of Walsall Town Council in 1916. Elections to the council were suspended because of the First World War and when in April 1916 a sitting councillor in Hatherton Ward resigned to devote more time to his business, Leckie was proposed for co-option and chosen over a candidate put forward by the Labour Party and Trades Council. He retained his seat comfortably at the municipal elections of 1919 and went on to a distinguished local government career. He was later an alderman of what was by then the County Borough of Walsall from 1930 until 1937. He was Mayor of Walsall in 1926–27. In 1933 he was elected to the executive committee of the Association of Education Committees. In 1937 he was made an honorary freeman of Walsall. He also served as a Justice of the Peace.

== Parliament ==
Leckie was chairman of Walsall Liberal Association from 1912 to 1931 and in 1931 was chosen to be Liberal candidate for Walsall at the general election. This was the election following the formation of the National Government under Ramsay MacDonald. An agreement was made with the Conservatives, and Leckie got a free run against the sitting Labour Member of Parliament (MP) John McShane. When the Liberal Party withdrew from the National Government after the general election and divided into those who supported the coalition and those against, Leckie stayed with the National Liberal group led by Sir John Simon. He stood as a Liberal National again at the 1935 general election and was returned with a majority of 8,969 votes. The by-election in Walsall which followed Leckie's death resulted in a win for the Liberal National (government) candidate Sir George Schuster.

== Death ==
He died following a seizure on 9 August 1938 at a nursing home in Edgbaston, Birmingham, aged 72.

Parliament of the United Kingdom
Preceded by John James McShane	Member of Parliament for Walsall; 1931–1938	Succeeded by Sir George Schuster
