= Francis Murphy =

Francis Murphy may refer to:

- Francis Murphy (bishop) (1795–1858), Irish-born bishop in Australia
- Francis Murphy (Australian politician) (1809–1891), Australian politician and pastoralist
- Francis Murphy (diver) (1928–2012), Australian Olympic diver
- Francis Murphy (evangelist) (1836–1907), American temperance evangelist
- Francis Murphy (judge), Irish judge
- Francis P. Murphy (1877–1958), Republican 73rd Governor of New Hampshire
- Francis X. Murphy (1915–2002), Catholic theologian and chaplain
- Francis Murphy (Irish politician) (1810–1860)

== See also ==
- Frank Murphy (disambiguation)
- James Francis Murphy (disambiguation)
