= James Francis Murphy =

James Francis Murphy may refer to:

- Frank Murphy (public servant) (1893–1949), Australian public servant
- Jim Murphy (born 1967), Scottish politician

== See also ==
- Francis Murphy (disambiguation)
- James Francis (disambiguation)
- James Murphy (disambiguation)
