= Francis James (disambiguation) =

Francis James (1918–1992) was an Australian publisher and eccentric, imprisoned as a spy.

Francis James may also refer to:

- Francis James (American politician) (1799–1886), U.S. Representative from Pennsylvania
- Francis James (missionary) (1851–1900), British Christian missionary in China
- Francis James (MP), MP for Dorchester

== See also ==
- Frank James (disambiguation)
- Frances James (disambiguation)
- James Francis (disambiguation)
