= George Schuster (public servant) =

Sir George Schuster

Sir George Ernest Schuster KCSI KCMG CBE MC (25 April 1881 – 5 June 1982) was a British barrister, financier, colonial administrator and Liberal politician.

== Biography ==
He was the son of Ernest Schuster, a King's Counsel, and was educated at Charterhouse School and New College, Oxford. He was called to the bar at Lincoln's Inn in 1905. In 1908 he married Gwendolen Parker, daughter of Mr Justice Parker, later Baron Parker of Waddington.

At the outbreak of the First World War, Schuster was working in finance in the City of London, and was prospective Liberal parliamentary candidate for Eskdale, North Cumberland. He held a commission in the Oxfordshire Yeomanry, and was mobilised to serve on the Western Front until 1918, when he joined the allied force in the Murmansk area. He ended the war with the rank of lieutenant-colonel, having been awarded the Military Cross and appointed Commander of the Order of the British Empire. He was also decorated with the Russian Order of St. Vladimir.

Following the war he took further training in finance at the University of Birmingham, and became a member of the treasury advisory committee of the League of Nations. In 1922 he was appointed Financial Secretary to the Government of Sudan. In 1925 he was appointed a Knight Commander of the Order of St Michael and St George. In 1927 he ended his appointment to the government of Sudan, having been appointed as Economic and Financial Advisor to the Secretary of State for the Colonies. In 1928 he succeeded Sir Basil Phillott Blackett as finance minister of the Council of India. In 1931 he was made a Knight Commander of the Star of India. He served as finance minister until 1929, during which time he was injured during a bomb attack in the Central Legislative Assembly by Bhagat Singh and Batukeshwar Dutt.

On return to the UK, Schuster resumed his career in banking. In August 1938 the sitting Liberal National Member of Parliament (MP) for Walsall, Joseph Leckie, died. The parties forming the National Government agreed on Schuster as their candidate, nominated by the Liberal Nationals and supported by the Conservatives. Schuster was opposed by George Jeger of the Labour Party, and foreign policy was the main issue at the by-election. Polling took place on 16 November, and Schuster comfortably held the seat for the government with a majority of 7,158 over Jeger. His Liberal National colleague Robert Bernays, who opened the by-election campaign with a speech in Walsall on 31 October, remarked that "[in] three weeks of campaigning the Schusters captured the hearts of the town". He remained a member of the House of Commons until 1945, working with Stafford Cripps on war production. At the 1945 general election he was defeated, with Labour's Major W T Wells taking the seat.

Following the loss of his seat, Schuster was given several appointments to official bodies: he was chairman of the Cotton Working Party, a member of the committee on industrial productivity, and conducted an inquiry into the finances of Malta. In 1951 he became chairman of the Oxford Regional Hospital Board. He also led a highly successful campaign to raise corporate funding for the Public Schools Appointments Board which encouraged young people to enter a wider range of careers than previously. He subsequently chaired the organisation.

In 1962, he became honorary treasurer of the international development charity, Voluntary Service Overseas and was involved in fund-raising for the establishment of the United World College of the Atlantic, of which he was chairman of the board of governors until 1973.

Sir George Schuster died in June 1982, aged 101.

Parliament of the United Kingdom
| Preceded by Joseph Leckie | Member of Parliament for Walsall; 1938–1945 | Succeeded by William Wells |
