= 1938 Walsall by-election =

UK by-election

The 1938 Walsall by-election was a parliamentary by-election held for the British House of Commons constituency of Walsall on 16 November 1938. The by-election was caused by the death of the sitting Liberal National Member of Parliament, Joseph Leckie. The election was won by George Schuster, a fellow Liberal National.

== Candidates ==
=== Liberal National ===
The Liberal Nationals selected Sir George Schuster. Schuster was something of a renaissance man. He had qualified as a barrister and had already had successful careers in business, colonial government, and economics. He came from a wealthy family with banking and cotton interests. As a representative of the National Government Schuster was not opposed by the Conservatives, although they were apparently disappointed the Liberal Nationals exercised their right to find their own successor to Leckie and did not cede the National nomination to the local Conservatives. Schuster later went on to spend 22 years on Oxfordshire County Council and achieve success in the field of further education as Chairman of the Board of Governors of Atlantic College from 1963-1973. He died in 1982 aged 101 years.

=== Labour ===
Schuster was therefore opposed only by the Labour Party candidate, George Jeger, a journalist from London and a local councillor in Shoreditch, of which he was mayor in 1938. Jeger had been Labour candidate in Bethnal Green South West at the 1935 general election. He went on to represent Winchester (1945–1950) and Goole (1950–1971) in Parliament.

== Issues ==
As the National candidate, Schuster sought to defend the record of the National Government and in particular the foreign policy associated with Prime Minister Neville Chamberlain. The great issue of the day was the worsening of international relations with the rise of Adolf Hitler in Germany, Benito Mussolini in Italy and Japanese expansionism in the Far East. Chamberlain’s policy of appeasing these dissatisfied powers, in the immediate glow of what was thought to be Chamberlain’s success in getting the Munich Agreement signed at the end of September, was the one that Schuster, and those in the government supporting him, chose to emphasise. He also attacked the Labour Party for its support of economic planning and state regulation at the expense of small business and local enterprise and for its allegation that the government planned further cuts in social welfare provision. However, the main issue was for the electors of Walsall to show their approval or rejection of the Munich Agreement.

For Labour, George Jeger attacked the government’s record on international and domestic policy. He was reported in the local press as saying that the National Government was not firm enough in its stand for peace and had failed the League of Nations but he also criticised the government’s re-armament policy as taking funds away from essential social services. Jeger attacked Chamberlain’s efforts at Munich saying that forcing Czechoslovakia to hand over the Sudetenland merely encouraged further aggression by Hitler and sacrificed a democratic country in the face of Nazi blackmail. The Times headline over its by-election coverage of 14 November summed it up –‘Walsall Contest – Foreign Policy the Main Issue'.

== Result ==
The Liberal National Party held the seat.

Walsall by-election, 1938: Staffordshire, Walsall
Party	Candidate	Votes	%	±%
Liberal National	George Schuster	28,720	57.1	−0.4
Labour	George Jeger	21,562	42.9	+3.4
Majority		7,158	14.2	−3.8
Turnout		50,282	75.9	+0.6
Liberal National hold		Swing	-0.4	

== See also ==
- List of United Kingdom by-elections
- United Kingdom by-election records
