= Forster baronets of Coolderry (1794) =

Escutcheon of the Forster baronets of Coolderry

The Forster baronetcy of Coolderry, County Monaghan was created in the Baronetage of Ireland on 15 January 1794 for the Rev. Thomas Forster, a priest of the Church of Ireland. His father Nicholas Forster had assumed the title of baronet by 1739. His mother was Caroline Foster, daughter of John Foster of Dunleer. Thomas Forster had married in 1786 Dorcas Howse, daughter of George Howse, and in 1787 had succeeded his elder brother Anthony in the family estates. The title became extinct on the death of the 4th baronet in 1904.

== Forster baronets, of Coolderry (1794) ==
- Sir Thomas Forster, 1st Baronet (1751–1843)
- Sir George Forster, 2nd Baronet (1796–1876), Member of Parliament for County Monaghan 1852–1865
- Sir Thomas Oriel Forster, 3rd Baronet (1824–1895)
- Sir Robert Forster, 4th Baronet (1827–1904)
