= William Preston (British politician) =

British industrialist and politician (1874–1941)

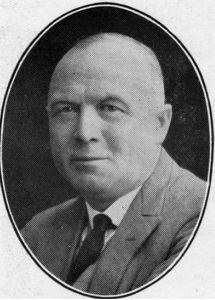
William Preston

William Preston (February 1874 - 22 November 1941) was a British industrialist and Conservative politician.

== Biography ==
Born in 1874, Preston was educated at Walsall Grammar School and Weston School, Bath. In 1907 he married Lilly Swinton Sanders, and he became managing director of William Sanders & Co (Wednesbury) Limited, a major manufacturer of electrical switching equipment. He played cricket for Staffordshire in the Minor Counties Championship, making one appearance in 1901 against Northamptonshire and another in 1911, against Lincolnshire.

At the 1924 general election, Preston was chosen as Conservative candidate for the Walsall constituency. He unseated the sitting Liberal MP, Patrick Collins. However, following his election, it was discovered that Preston had received payments for two small contracts to supply electrical fittings to the Post Office stores department. As a government contractor, Preston was ineligible to stand for Parliament, and his election was declared void.

William Preston Indemnity Act 1925 (Note: Section 2.)
- Act of Parliament
- Parliament of the United Kingdom
- Long title: An Act to indemnify and relieve William Preston, Esquire, from any penal consequences which he may have incurred or suffered by sitting or voting as a member of the House of Commons during a time when he was executing, holding or enjoying a contract, agreement or commission made or entered into with the Postmaster-General, and for purposes incidental thereto.
- Citation: 15 & 16 Geo. 5. c. 7
- Territorial extent: United Kingdom

Dates
- Royal assent: 5 March 1925
- Commencement: 5 March 1925 (Note: The Acts of Parliament (Commencement) Act 1793.)
- Repealed: 23 May 1950
Other legislation
Repealed by	Statute Law Revision Act 1950

Status: Repealed

Text of statute as originally enacted

Having overcome his legal difficulties, Preston was selected as Conservative candidate at the ensuing by-election. The poll was held on 27 February, and Preston was elected ahead of Liberal and Labour candidates, with a similar majority to that gained at the 1924 election.

Preston was only a member of the House of Commons for one term. At the 1929 general election there was a swing to Labour, and he was defeated by the party's candidate John James McShane. He retired from politics. William Preston died after a long illness at his home, Gorway, Walsall in November 1941, aged 67.

== Notes ==
Parliament of the United Kingdom
Preceded by Patrick Collins	Member of Parliament for Walsall; 1924–1929	Succeeded by John James McShane
