= Egg Harbor (town), Wisconsin =

Egg Harbor, Wisconsin
- Town
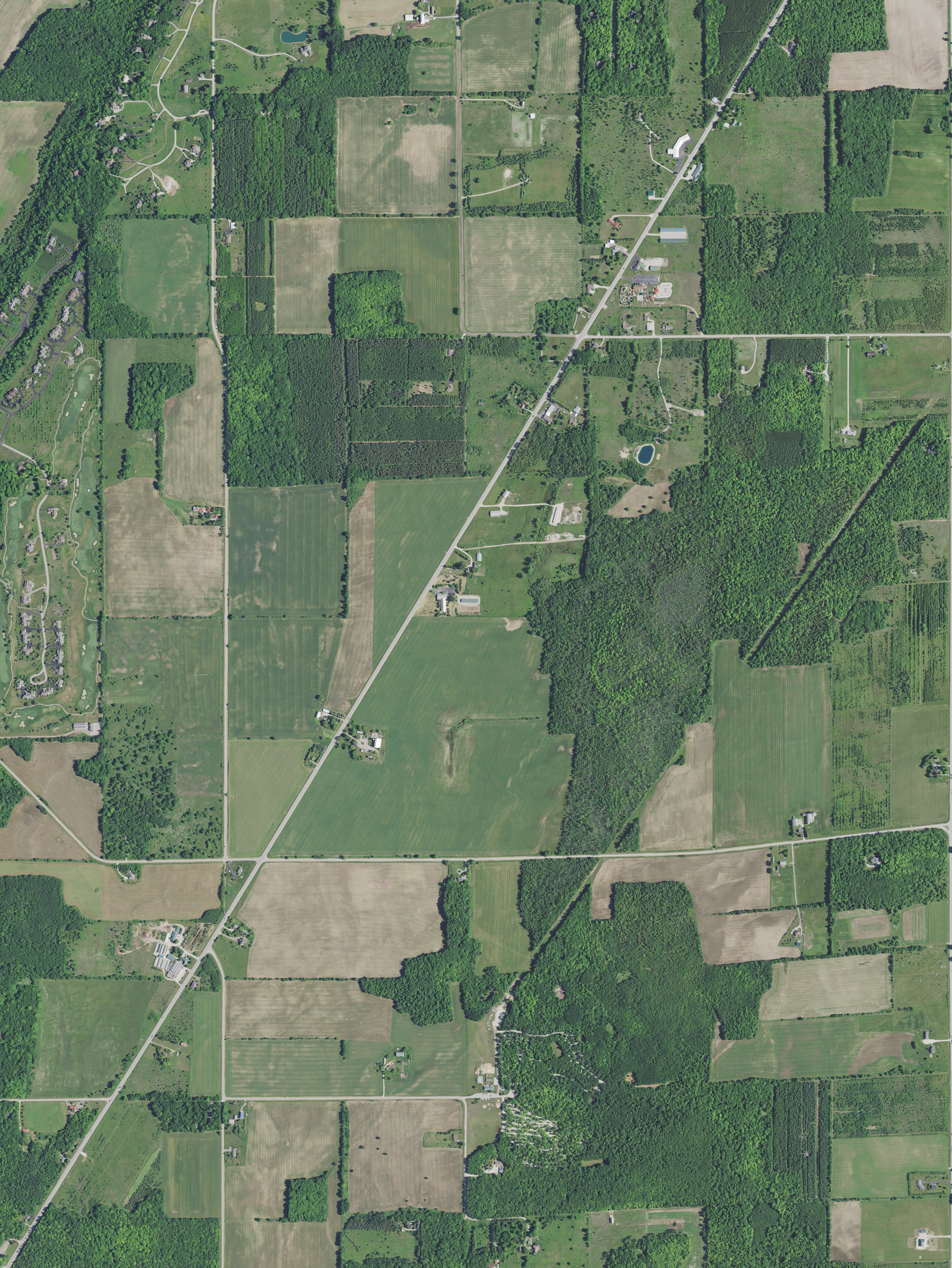
- Wisconsin Highway 42 passing through the southwestern town of Egg Harbor

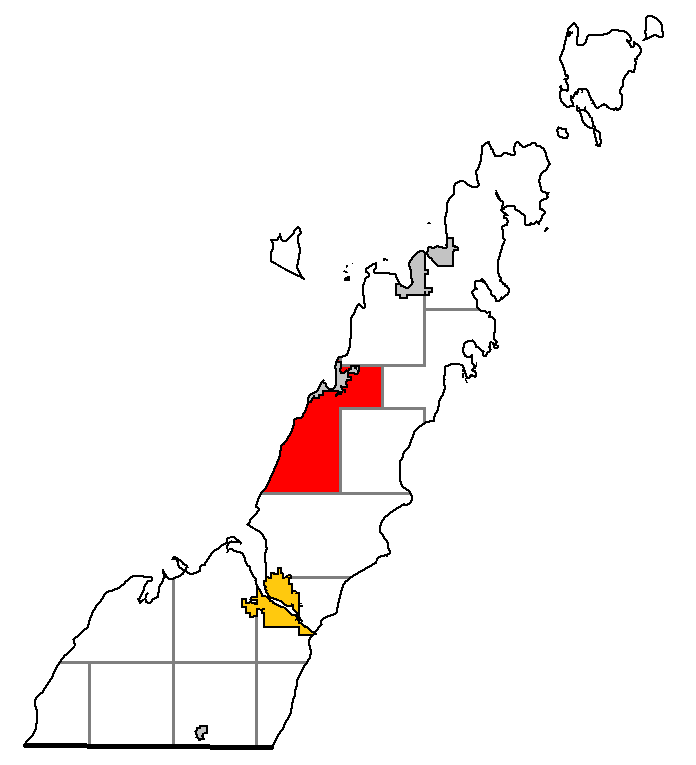
- Location of Egg Harbor, within Door County
- Coordinates: 45°0′27″N 87°18′42″W
- Country: United States
- State: Wisconsin
- County: Door

Area
  - Total: 102.9 sq mi (266.5 km^{2})
  - Land: 36.6 sq mi (94.7 km^{2})
  - Water: 66.4 sq mi (171.9 km^{2})
- Elevation: 630 ft (192 m)

Population (2020)
  - Total: 1,458
  - Density: 39.9/sq mi (15.4/km^{2})
- Time zone: UTC-6 (Central (CST))
  - Summer (DST): UTC-5 (CDT)
- Area code: 920
- FIPS code: 55-22875
- GNIS feature ID: 1583137
- Website: https://townofeggharbor.org/

Egg Harbor is a town in Door County, Wisconsin, United States. The population was 1,458 at the 2020 census. The Village of Egg Harbor and the unincorporated community of Carlsville are located within the town. The Town of Egg Harbor was hit by an F3 tornado in 1998.

== Geography ==
According to the United States Census Bureau, the town has a total area of 102.9 square miles (266.5 km^{2}), of which 36.6 square miles (94.7 km^{2}) is land and 66.3 square miles (171.8 km^{2}) (64.47%) is water. Limestone outcroppings of the Niagara Escarpment are visible at several locations within the town and can be seen in the Bayshore Blufflands State Natural Area.

The entrance to Horseshoe Bay Cave is in Frank E. Murphy County Park on the western side of the town. Horseshoe Bay Cave is the second-longest cave in the state and the longest one currently undeveloped. At night, bats in the cave engage in fall swarms from about August 15 through October 1, and hibernation is from about October 1 through May 15. White-nose syndrome caused the bat population to fall from 1,100 bats in 2015 to a low of 24 bats in 2019. In March 2022 there were 44 bats, and two of the bat species have not returned since the epidemic. Before the epidemic, the cave was the largest bat hibernaculum in the state with a winter population ranging from 1,000 to 1,500 bats.

== Demographics ==
As of the census of 2000, there were 1,194 people, 491 households, and 362 families residing in the town. The population density was 32.7 people per square mile (12.6/km^{2}). There were 930 housing units at an average density of 25.4 per square mile (9.8/km^{2}). The racial makeup of the town was 98.16% White, 0.25% Black or African American, 0.67% Native American, 0.17% Asian, 0.34% from other races, and 0.42% from two or more races. 0.50% of the population were Hispanic or Latino of any race.

There were 491 households, out of which 27.7% had children under the age of 18 living with them, 64.0% were married couples living together, 6.1% had a female householder with no husband present, and 26.1% were non-families. 21.6% of all households were made up of individuals, and 6.9% had someone living alone who was 65 years of age or older. The average household size was 2.43 and the average family size was 2.81.

In the town, the population was spread out, with 22.0% under the age of 18, 5.7% from 18 to 24, 27.2% from 25 to 44, 30.7% from 45 to 64, and 14.3% who were 65 years of age or older. The median age was 43 years. For every 100 females there were 99.0 males. For every 100 females age 18 and over, there were 102.4 males.

The median income for a household in the town was $43,098, and the median income for a family was $47,778. Males had a median income of $31,346 versus $20,391 for females. The per capita income for the town was $24,329. About 6.3% of families and 8.5% of the population were below the poverty line, including 16.9% of those under age 18 and 5.6% of those age 65 or over.

== Climate ==
Horseshoe Point and Leroys Point

Climate chart (precipitation, max. and min. temperature)
J	F	M	A	M	J	J	A	S	O	N	D
57 −9 −12	54 −7 −11	60 0 −7	129 9 −1	93 16 3	85 20 9	97 24 16	78 23 13	87 19 12	129 10 4	85 2 −2	65 −3 −6
- █ Average max. and min. temperatures in °C
- █ Precipitation totals in mm
Imperial conversion
J	F	M	A	M	J	J	A	S	O	N	D
2.2 16 10	2.1 19 12	2.4 32 19	5.1 48 30	3.7 61 37	3.3 68 48	3.8 75 61	3.1 73 55	3.4 66 54	5.1 50 39	3.3 36 28	2.6 27 21
- █ Average max. and min. temperatures in °F
- █ Precipitation totals in inches

== Gallery ==
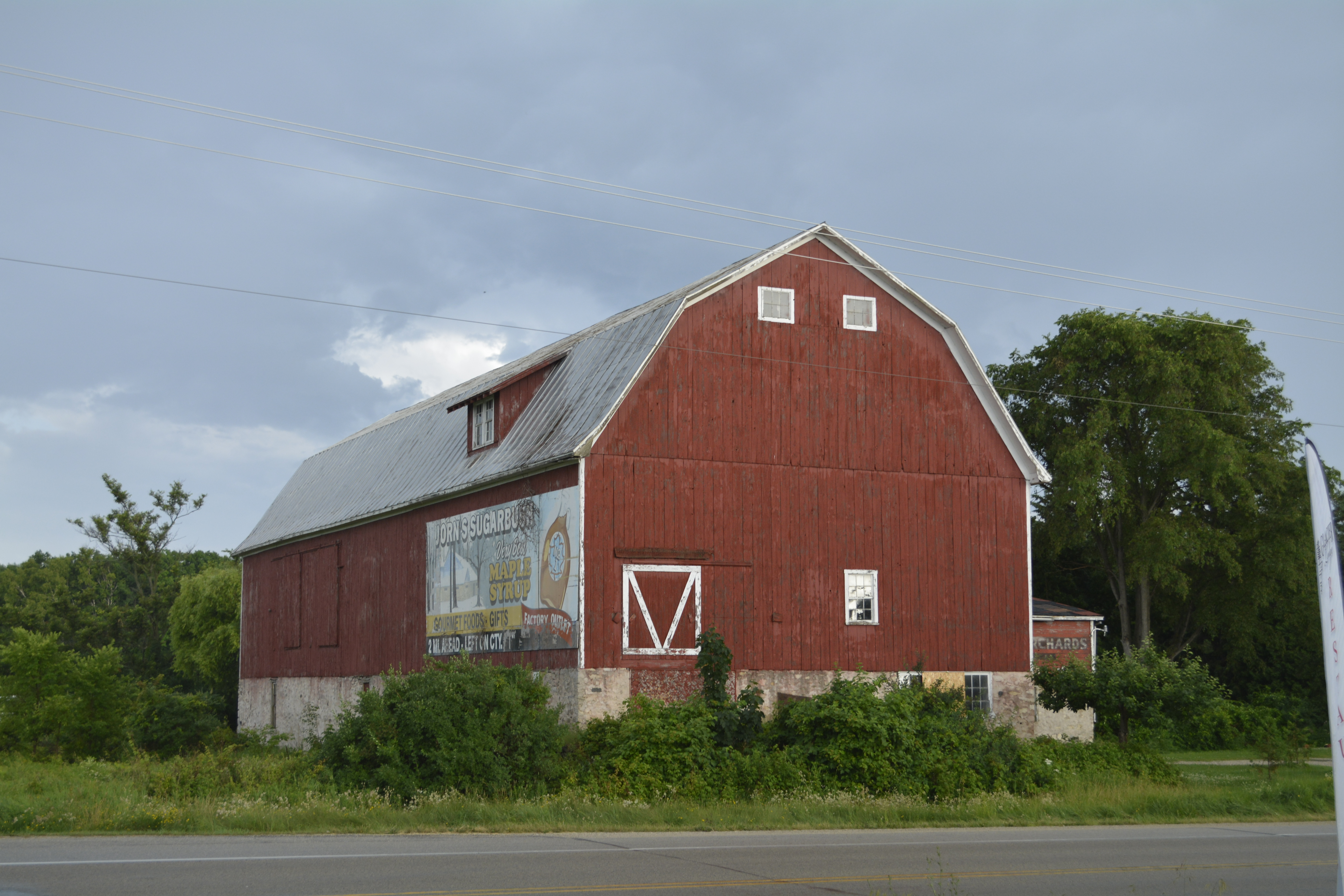
Barn along Wisconsin Highway 42

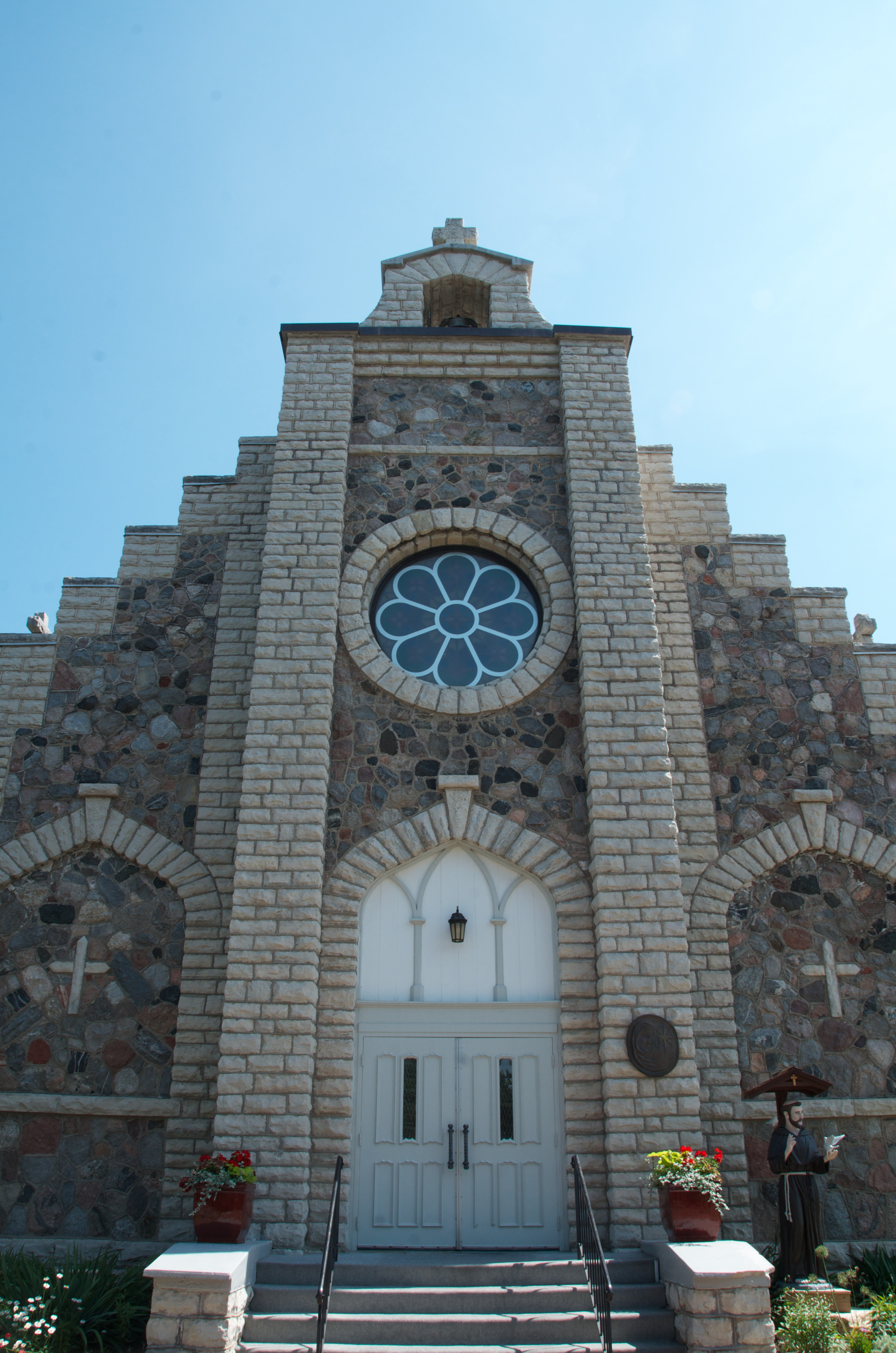
St. John the Baptist Catholic Church

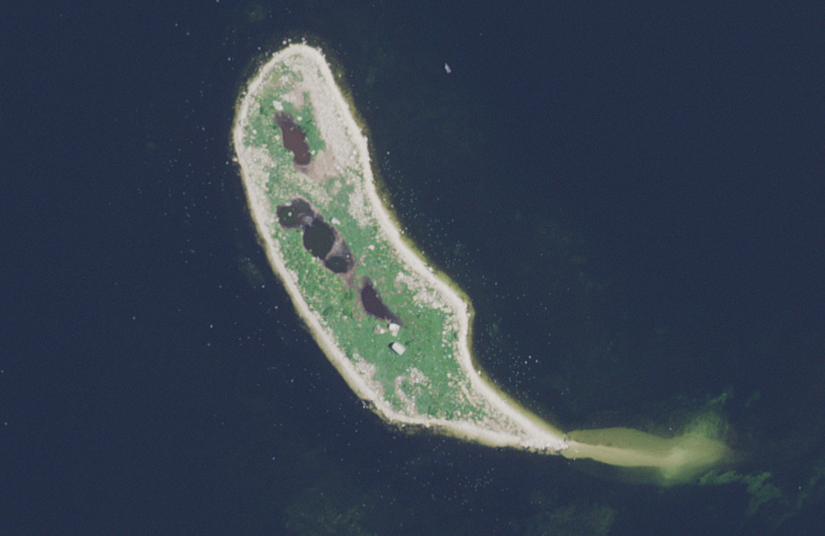
Hat Island is within the town

The far southwestern corner, including most of the Bayshore Blufflands State Natural Area and also showing the border with Sevastopol along the bottom.

The southwestern part of the town, including Carlsville (lower and to the right of the center). The road running east and west along most of the bottom marks the southern border with Sevastopol.
