= George Howse =

Anglican priest

George Howse was an Anglican priest in Ireland in the mid-18th century.

Howse was born in Bandon, County Cork and educated at Trinity College, Dublin. He was Archdeacon of Dromore from 1742 until 1770.
