= Forster baronets of Aldermaston (1620) =

Baronetcy in the Baronetage of England

Escutcheon of the Forster baronets of Aldermaston

The Forster baronetcy of Aldermaston was created in the Baronetage of England by James I for Humphrey Forster of Aldermaston Court, on 20 May 1620. He was High Sheriff of Berkshire in 1619. His parents were Sir William Forster KB (died 1618) and Mary Steward, daughter of Mark Steward. In 1616 he had married Anne Kingsmill, daughter of Sir William Kingsmill.

=== Forster baronets, of Aldermaston (1620) ===
- Sir Humphrey Forster, 1st Baronet (1595–1663)
- Sir Humphrey Forster, 2nd Baronet (c. 1711)
