= Pat Collins (showman) =

Pat Collins in 1921

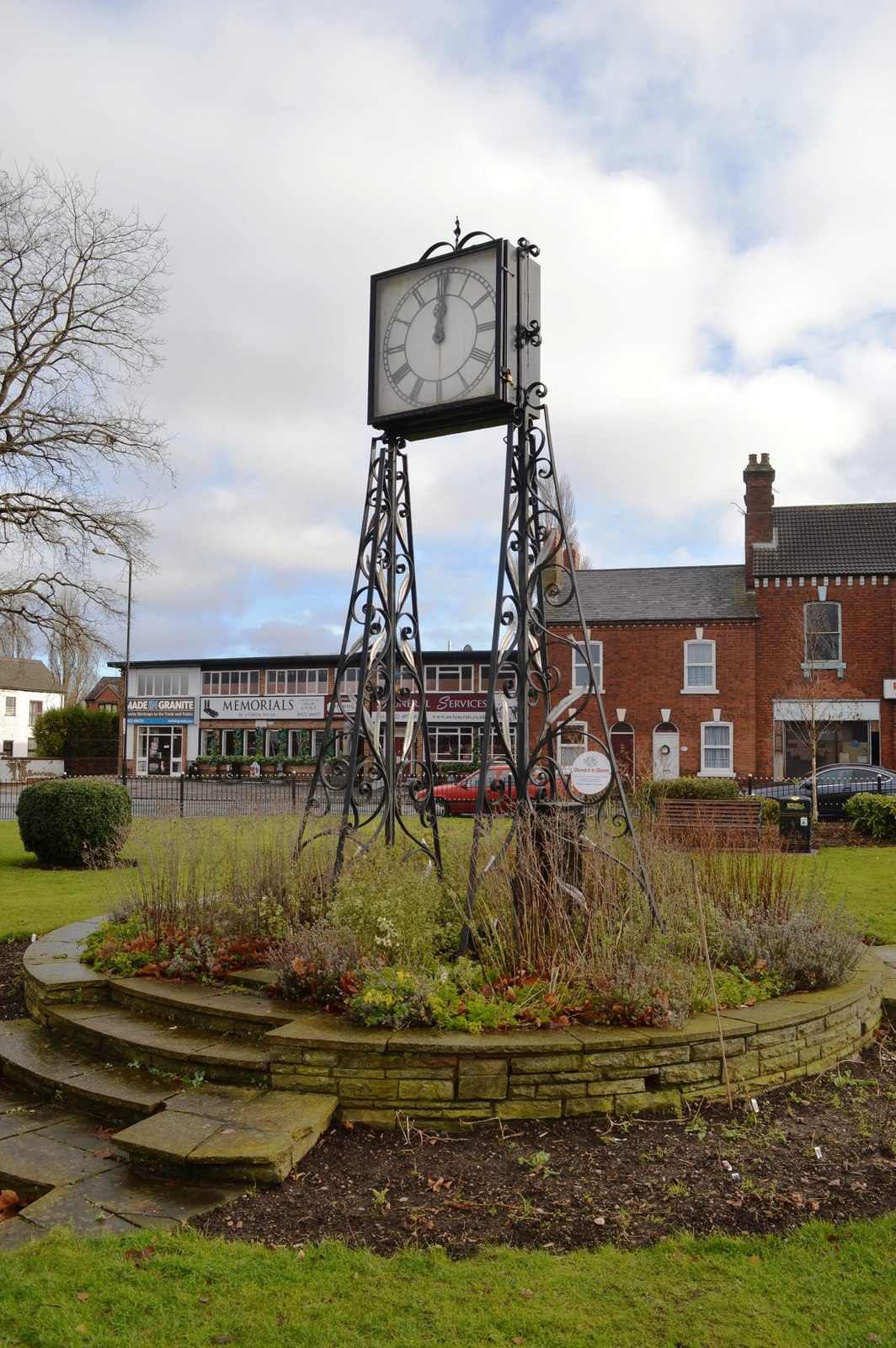
Memorial clock in Bloxwich

Patrick Collins (12 May 1859 – 9 December 1943) was a Liberal MP for Walsall (1922–1924) and Mayor of Walsall (1938), but he is chiefly remembered for his involvement in the fairgrounds industry; in fact, the "Pat Collins Funfairs" company still bears his name. He was also an early presenter of moving pictures, both in travelling shows and in cinemas. At one point, he was running four separate fairs a week and owned thirteen cinemas and several skating rinks.

== Life ==
Collins was born 12 May 1859 at a fairground in Chester. He was one of five children born to John Collins, an agricultural labourer of Irish descent. Patrick attended St. Werburgh Catholic School in Chester but left at the age of ten to go travelling with his family. He was married twice, first to Flora Ross in 1880 (she died in 1933) and then to Clara Mullett, his secretary, in 1934 (she survived him). Flora gave him a son, Patrick Ross Collins (born 7 March 1886), who continued the family business. Pat Collins, Ltd. was created in 1899, when Collins had established a round of fairs in the Black Country based on traditional holidays or 'Wakes' from August to October.

He served as the president of the Showmen's Guild of Great Britain from 1920 to 1929. Residing in Bloxwich in the borough of Walsall, he became a Liberal Councillor in 1918, an Alderman in 1930, and Mayor of Walsall in 1938. In 1939 he was made a Freeman of the Borough of Walsall. He also won a place as Liberal MP for Walsall in the 1922 General Election, retaining his seat in the 1923 elections but losing it in the 1924 general election to a Conservative, W. Preston.

Patrick Collins died at his home, Lime Tree House, in Bloxwich in December 1943, aged 84, and was buried in the cemetery there.

Parliament of the United Kingdom
| Preceded by Sir Richard Cooper | Member of Parliament for Walsall; 1922–1924 | Succeeded by William Preston |
