= Frank E. Murphy =

American politician

Member of the Michigan House of Representatives from the Wayne County 1st district
- In office January 1, 1925 – 1926

Personal details
- Born: May 17, 1896
- Party: Republican

Military service
- Allegiance: United States
- Branch/service: United States Army
- Battles/wars: World War I

Frank E. Murphy (born May 17, 1896) was a Michigan politician.

== Early life ==
Murphy was born on May 17, 1896, to Irish-American parents. He attended school in Hartford, Connecticut.

== Military career ==
He served in the United States Army in France for eighteen months during World War I. He was in the 26th Infantry Division.

== Political career ==
Murphy was elected as a Republican member of the Michigan House of Representatives from the Wayne County 1st district on November 4, 1924. Murphy served in this position from January 7, 1925, to 1926.
