= Forster baronets of Stokesley (1649) =

Extinct baronetcy

The Forster baronetcy of Stokesley in the North Riding of Yorkshire was created at Saint-Germain-en-Laye on 18 September 1649, by letters patent, for Richard Forster. Cokayne comments that such titles created by the young king Charles II in exile "though not recognised on their creation became valid after the Restoration". Forster was an English recusant landowner and courtier, who had been employed as a courier to Paris and from 1635 was in the household of Queen Henrietta Maria. From 1644 he acted as her treasurer in France.

The 3rd Baronet died unmarried before 1714, and the title became extinct on his death.

== Forster baronets, of Stokesley (1649) ==
- Sir Richard Forster, 1st Baronet (c.1585–1661)
- Sir Richard Forster, 2nd Baronet (c.1623–c.1680)
- Sir Richard Forster, 3rd Baronet (c.1653–c.1710)
