= Frank Murphy (Michigan legislator) =

American politician (1878–1940)

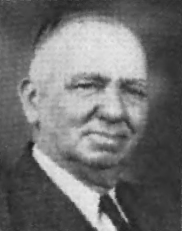

Member of the Michigan House of Representatives from the Wayne County 1st district
- In office January 1, 1937 – 1940

Personal details
- Born: January 12, 1878 Wyandotte, Michigan, U.S.
- Died: July 15, 1940 (aged 62) Detroit, Michigan, U.S.
- Party: Democratic

Frank Murphy (January 12, 1878 – July 15, 1940) was an American politician in Michigan.

== Early life ==
Murphy was born in Wyandotte, Michigan on January 12, 1878. Murphy was of Irish descent. His father, Frank Murphy, was a judge in this area and worked in the insurance business.

== Career ==
Murphy also worked in the insurance business. He also worked with other businesses at different times, including the Detroit Times, a telephone company, and a gas company. On November 3, 1937, Murphy was elected as a Democratic member of the Michigan House of Representatives from the Wayne County 1st district. He served in this position until 1940.
