= Forster baronets of East Greenwich (1661) =

Baronetcy in the Baronetage of England

The Forster baronetcy' of East Greenwich was created on 11 July 1661 in the Baronetage of England for Reginald Forster, a London barrister and goldsmith of Cripplegate. He financed the Royalist cause in the English Civil War. The 2nd baronet married, secondly, a Warwickshire heiress but died childless and the title became extinct.

=== Forster baronets, of East Greenwich (1661) ===
- Sir Reginald Forster, 1st Baronet (1618–1684)
- Sir Reginald Forster, 2nd Baronet (1640–1705). Extinct on his death without male heir.
