= Frank Murphy (footballer, born 1900) =

Australian rules footballer, born 1900

Personal information
- Full name: Francis James Murphy
- Born: 14 March 1900; Paddington, New South Wales
- Died: 28 May 1953 (aged 53); Fitzroy North, Victoria
- Original team: Carlton District
- Height: 185 cm (6 ft 1 in)
- Weight: 84 kg (185 lb)

Playing career^{1}
Years	Club	Games (Goals)
1921	Carlton	1 (0)
1922–1924	Hawthorn (VFA)	24 (6)
1924–1925	Rosedale	
1926–1928	Hawthorn	28 (20)
Total		53 (26)
- ^{1} Playing statistics correct to the end of 1928.

Frank Murphy (14 March 1900 – 28 May 1953) was an Australian rules footballer who played with Carlton and Hawthorn in the Victorian Football League (VFL).

== Family ==
The son of Michael Andrew Murphy and Esther Frances Murphy, nee Elliott, Francis James Murphy was born at Paddington in Sydney on 14 March 1900.

== Football ==
Recruited from Carlton District, Frank Murphy played a single senior game for Carlton in Round 18 of the 1921 VFL season.

Murphy moved to Hawthorn (then in the Victorian Football Association) in the middle of the 1922 season. He played 24 games for Hawthorn before moving to Rosedale in June 1924 and electing to play for the local team.

In 1926, with Hawthorn now playing in the Victorian Football League, Murphy expressed his wish to return to the club. His return was delayed until he could buy out the remainder of his contract with Rosedale. With the payment made, Murphy played a further 28 senior games for Hawthorn, finishing his senior career in 1928.
