= Egg Harbor, Wisconsin =

- Village
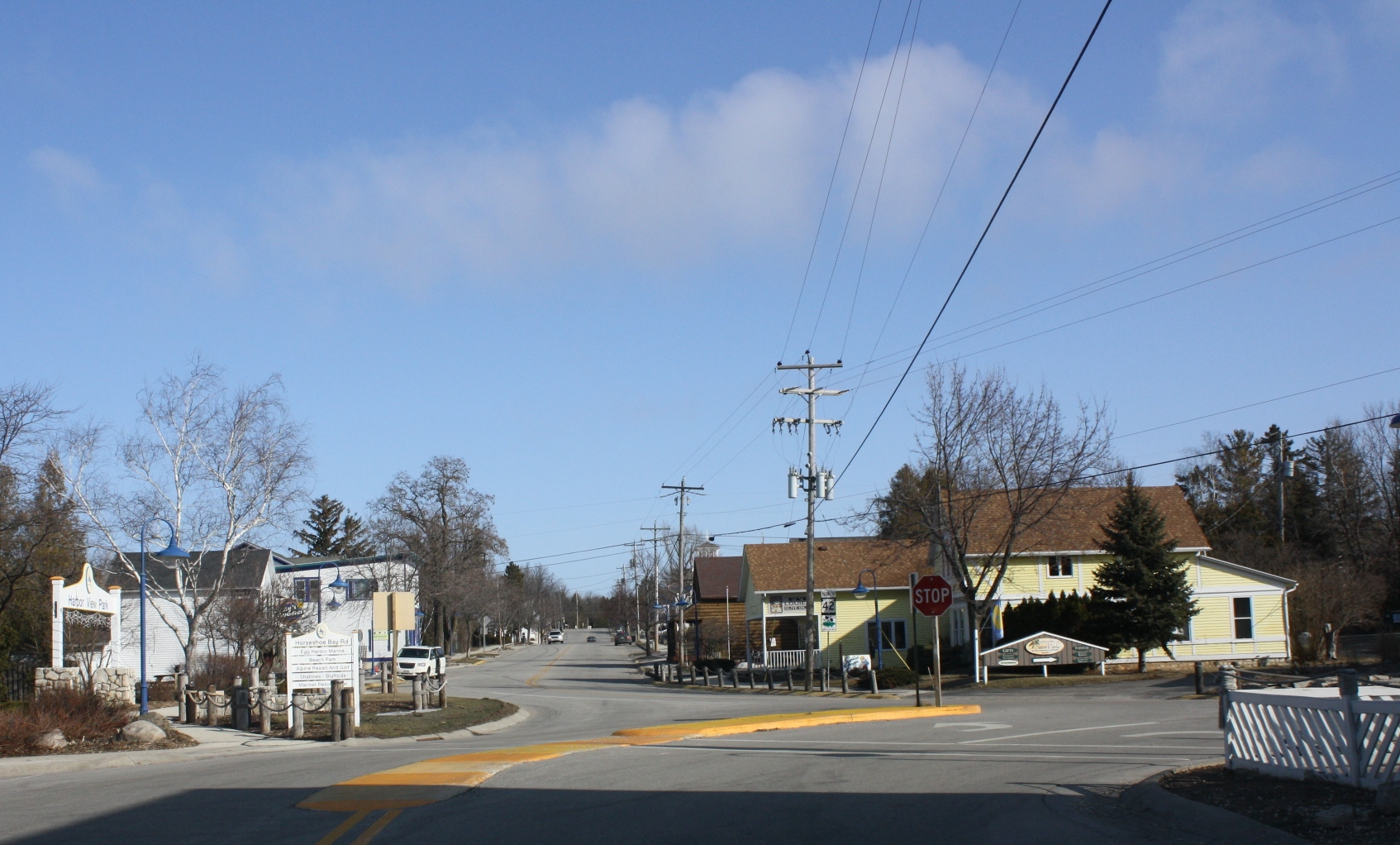
- Downtown Egg Harbor

- Location of Egg Harbor in Door County, Wisconsin.

- Location within Wisconsin Location within the United States
- Coordinates: 45°2′57″N 87°17′51″W
- Country: United States
- State: Wisconsin
- County: Door
- Incorporated: 1964

Area
  - Total: 6.62 sq mi (17.15 km^{2})
  - Land: 2.46 sq mi (6.38 km^{2})
  - Water: 4.16 sq mi (10.77 km^{2})
- Elevation: 630 ft (192 m)

Population (2020)
  - Total: 358
  - Density: 145/sq mi (56.1/km^{2})
- Time zone: UTC-6 (Central (CST))
  - Summer (DST): UTC-5 (CDT)
- Area code: 920
- FIPS code: 55-22850
- Website: https://villageofeggharbor.gov/

Egg Harbor is a village in Door County, Wisconsin, United States. The population was 358 at the 2020 census. It is adjacent to the Town of Egg Harbor and the Town of Gibraltar on the Door Peninsula, a popular Upper Midwest vacation destination.

The village was incorporated in 1964. The harbor was known to the Potawatomi as Che-bah-ye-sho-da-ning, or "ghost door".

== Geography ==
Egg Harbor is located at 45°2′57″N 87°17′51″W (45.049304, -87.297725). According to the United States Census Bureau, the village has a total area of 6.93 square miles (17.95 km^{2}), of which 2.46 square miles (6.37 km^{2}) is land and 4.47 square miles (11.58 km^{2}) is water.

=== Climate ===
Egg Harbor

Climate chart (precipitation, max. and min. temperature)
J	F	M	A	M	J	J	A	S	O	N	D
42 −4 −12	32 −2 −11	46 3 −6	77 10 0	84 17 7	98 23 12	85 26 15	83 25 15	79 21 11	82 13 5	55 6 −1	48 −2 −7
- █ Average max. and min. temperatures in °C
- █ Precipitation totals in mm
Imperial conversion
J	F	M	A	M	J	J	A	S	O	N	D
1.7 26 11	1.3 28 12	1.8 38 21	3 50 33	3.3 63 44	3.9 73 54	3.3 78 60	3.3 77 59	3.1 69 51	3.2 56 41	2.2 43 30	1.9 28 19
- █ Average max. and min. temperatures in °F
- █ Precipitation totals in inches

== Demographics ==
Historical population
Census	Pop.	Note	%±
1970	184		—
1980	238		29.3%
1990	183		−23.1%
2000	250		36.6%
2010	201		−19.6%
2020	358		78.1%
U.S. Decennial Census

=== 2010 census ===
As of the census of 2010, there were 201 people, 109 households, and 63 families living in the village. The population density was 81.7 inhabitants per square mile (31.5/km^{2}). There were 727 housing units at an average density of 295.5 per square mile (114.1/km^{2}). The racial makeup of the village was 96.0% White, 0.5% Native American, and 3.5% from other races. Hispanic or Latino of any race were 4.5% of the population.

There were 109 households, of which 11.9% had children under the age of 18 living with them, 48.6% were married couples living together, 4.6% had a female householder with no husband present, 4.6% had a male householder with no wife present, and 42.2% were non-families. 33.0% of all households were made up of individuals, and 15.6% had someone living alone who was 65 years of age or older. The average household size was 1.84 and the average family size was 2.24.

The median age in the village was 59.8 years. 7.5% of residents were under the age of 18; 3% were between the ages of 18 and 24; 17.5% were from 25 to 44; 36.9% were from 45 to 64; and 35.3% were 65 years of age or older. The gender makeup of the village was 47.8% male and 52.2% female.

=== 2000 census ===
As of the census of 2000, there were 250 people, 132 households, and 78 families living in the village. The population density was 129.6 people per square mile (50.0/km^{2}). There were 568 housing units at an average density of 294.4 per square mile (113.6/km^{2}). The racial makeup of the village was 98.80% White, 0.40% Black or African American and 0.80% Native American. 0.00% of the population were Hispanic or Latino of any race.

There were 132 households, out of which 12.1% had children under the age of 18 living with them, 52.3% were married couples living together, 6.1% had a female householder with no husband present, and 40.2% were non-families. 37.9% of all households were made up of individuals, and 12.9% had someone living alone who was 65 years of age or older. The average household size was 1.89 and the average family size was 2.42.

In the village, the population was spread out, with 10.0% under the age of 18, 4.4% from 18 to 24, 18.4% from 25 to 44, 36.8% from 45 to 64, and 30.4% who were 65 years of age or older. The median age was 55 years. For every 100 females, there were 74.8 males. For every 100 females age 18 and over, there were 74.4 males.

The median income for a household in the village was $41,667, and the median income for a family was $73,750. Males had a median income of $35,500 versus $35,357 for females. The per capita income for the village was $41,977. None of the families and 2.9% of the population were living below the poverty line, including none under the age of 18 and 4.8% of those over 65 years of age.

== Education ==
Gibraltar Area Schools serves the community. Gibraltar Elementary School and Gibraltar Secondary School are the two schools.

Zion Lutheran School is a 4K-8 school of the Wisconsin Evangelical Lutheran Synod in Egg Harbor.

== Gallery ==
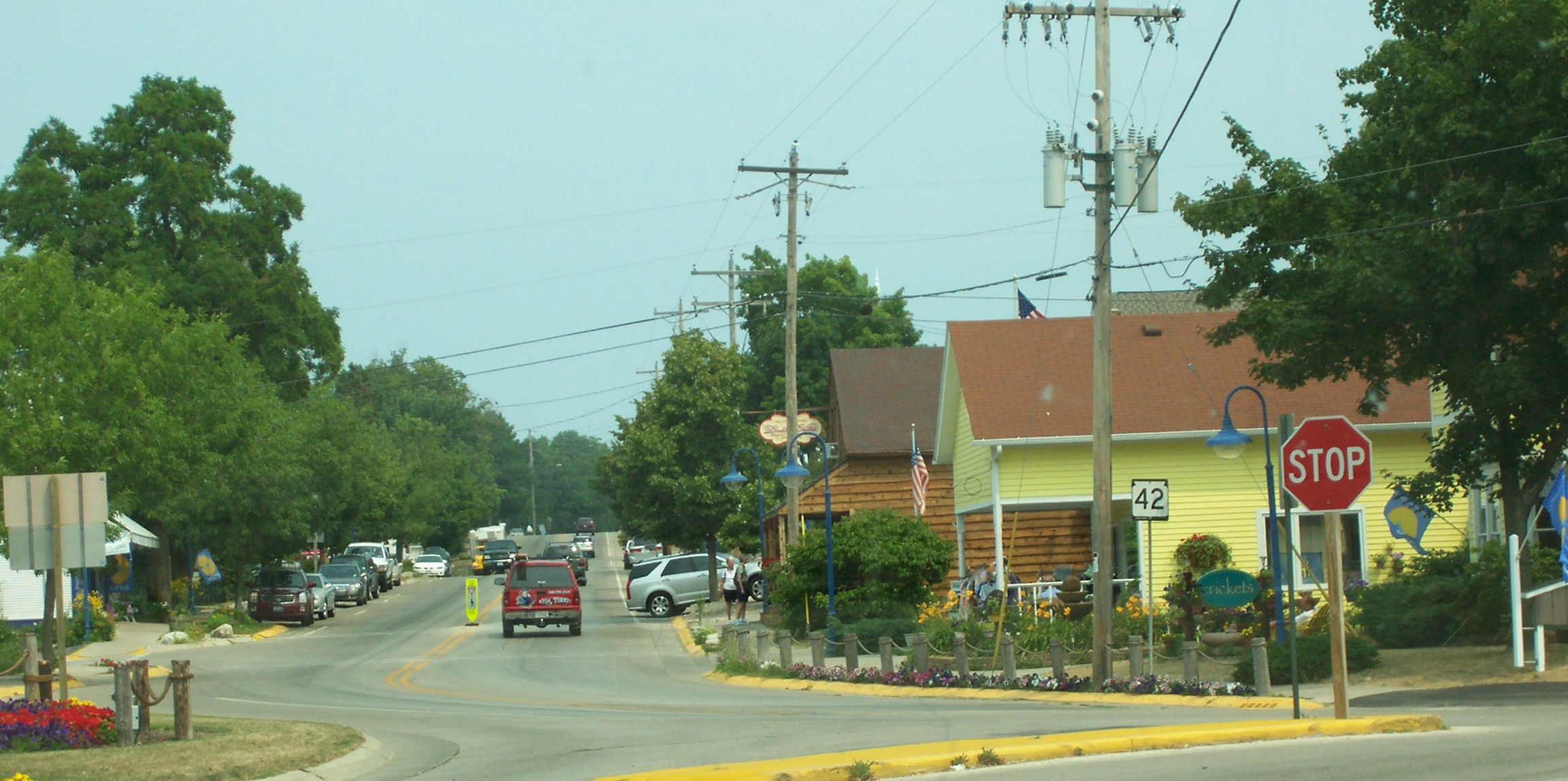
Downtown Egg Harbor on Wisconsin Highway 42

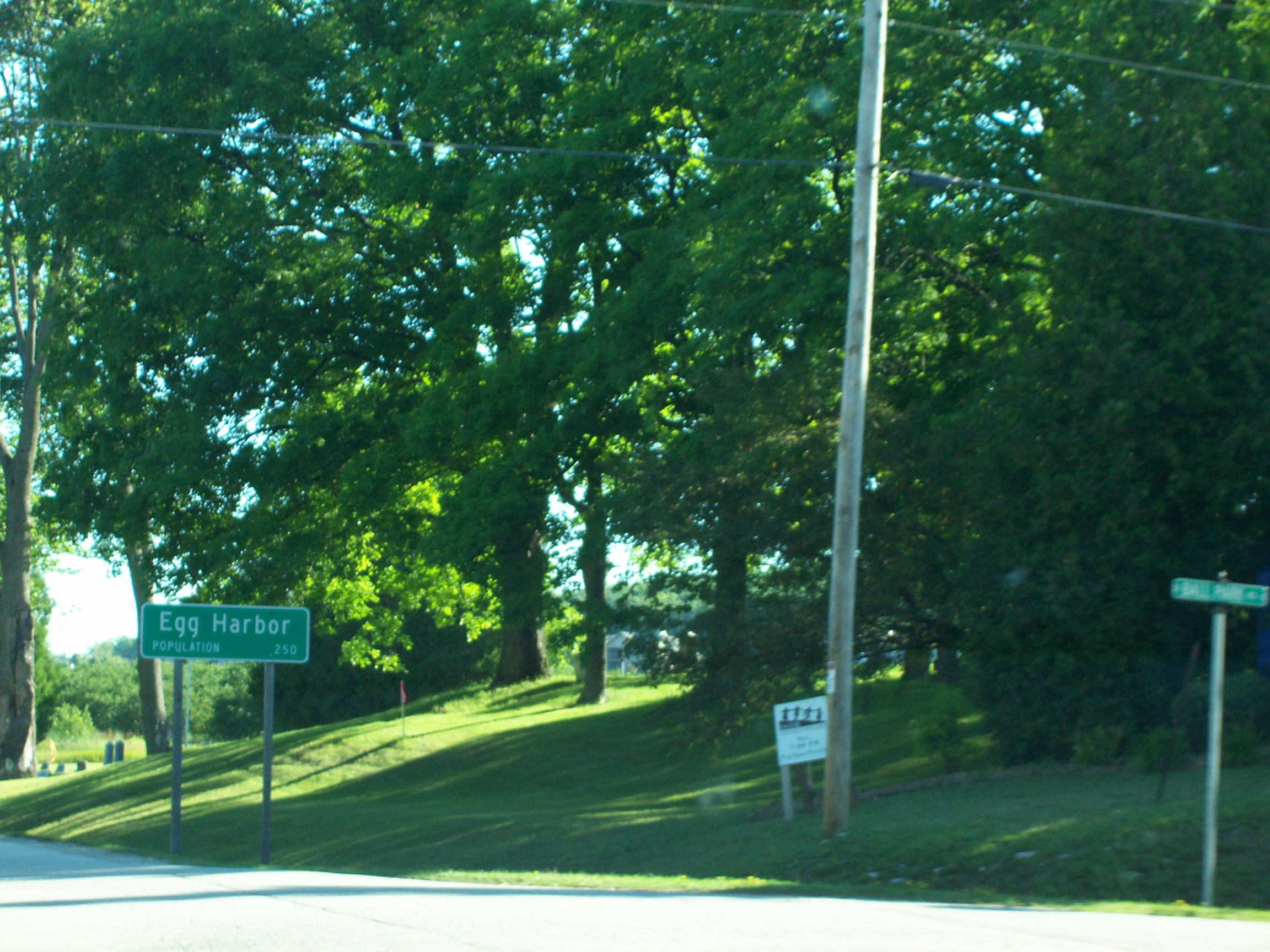
Welcome sign

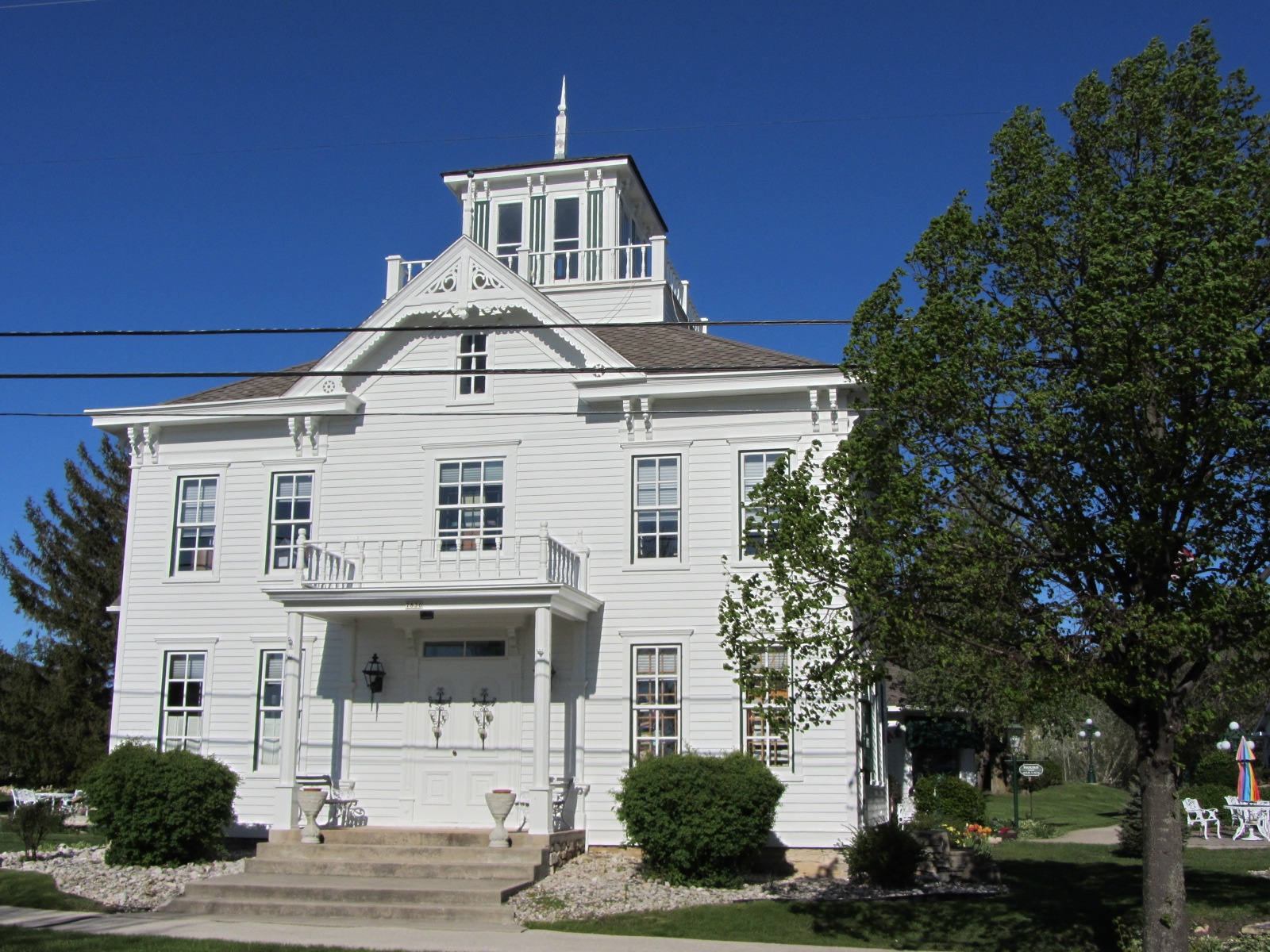
Egg Harbor Welcome Center

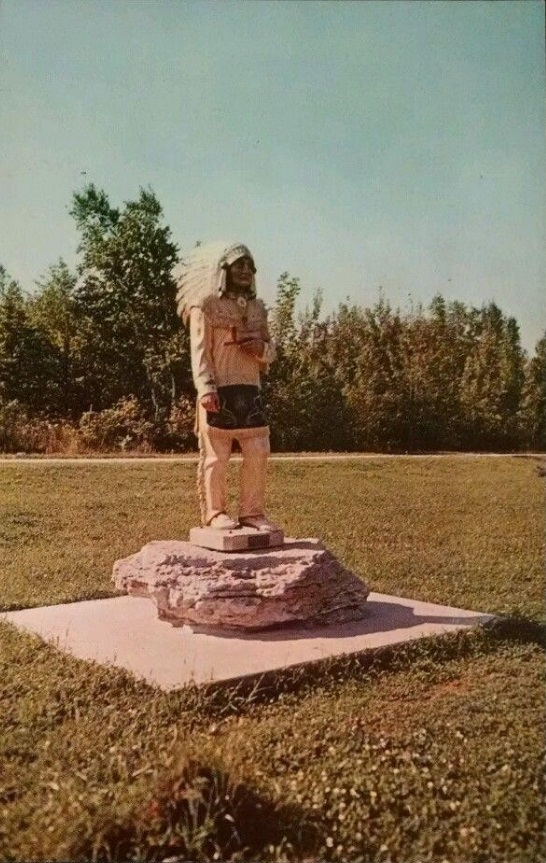
Statue of Roy Oshkosh, Menominee chief and Egg harbor resident during the time the statue was standing in Murphy Park

Aerial view of most of the village and some of the adjacent town of Egg Harbor, 2020
