= John James McShane =

British school teacher and politician (1882–1972)

John James McShane (1 October 1882 – 26 May 1972) was a British school teacher and Labour politician.

== Early life ==
He was born in Wishaw, Lanarkshire, Scotland, and was the son of Philip McShane, a coalminer, and his wife Bridget. Both his parents were born in Ireland. He was educated at St Ignatius School, Wishaw.

== Career ==
In 1909 McShane became a schoolmaster, and subsequently moved to Walsall in the English Black Country, where he was the headmaster of the St Mary's the Mount Catholic School.

In 1929 he was selected as the Labour Party's candidate to contest the Walsall parliamentary constituency. He succeeded in taking the seat, ousting the sitting Conservative MP William Preston and beating the former Liberal cabinet minister T J Macnamara into third place. McShane was only in parliament for two years, losing his seat to Joseph Leckie of the Liberals at the 1931 general election.

McShane returned to teaching. He was the first headmaster of the Joseph Leckie Secondary Modern School, named after his successor in parliament, which opened in 1939.

== Death ==
McShane died in 1972, aged 89.

Parliament of the United Kingdom
Preceded by William Preston	Member of Parliament for Walsall; 1929–1931	Succeeded by Joseph Leckie
