= Parliamentary constituencies in Staffordshire =

The ceremonial county of Staffordshire (which includes the area of the Stoke-on-Trent unitary authority) is divided into 12 seats: 2 borough and 10 county constituencies, one of which includes part of the Metropolitan Borough of Dudley.

== Constituencies ==
Conservative † Labour ‡ Reform UK ¤

Constituency (Note: BC denotes borough constituency, CC denotes county constituency.)	Electorate	Majority (Note: The majority is the number of votes the winning candidate receives more than their nearest rival.)	Member of Parliament	Nearest opposition	Map
Burton and Uttoxeter CC	77,992	2,266	Jacob Collier ‡	Kate Kniveton †	
Cannock Chase CC	76,974	3,125	Josh Newbury ‡	Amanda Milling †	
Kingswinford and South Staffordshire CC (part)	71,662	6,303	Mike Wood †	Sally Benton ‡	
Lichfield CC	76,118	810	Dave Robertson ‡	Michael Fabricant †	
Newcastle-under-Lyme CC	67,839	5,069	Adam Jogee ‡	Simon Tagg †	
Stafford CC	70,608	4,595	Leigh Ingham ‡	Theo Clarke †	
Staffordshire Moorlands CC	69,892	1,175	Karen Bradley †	Alastair Watson ‡	
Stoke-on-Trent Central BC	73,693	6,409	Gareth Snell ‡	Luke Shenton ¤	
Stoke-on-Trent North BC	69,790	5,082	David Williams ‡	Jonathan Gullis †	
Stoke-on-Trent South CC	68,263	627	Allison Gardner ‡	Jack Brereton †	
Stone, Great Wyrley and Penkridge CC	71,570	5,466	Gavin Williamson †	Jacqueline Brown ‡	
Tamworth CC	75,059	1,382	Sarah Edwards ‡	Eddie Hughes †	

== Historic constituencies ==
=== Before 1832 ===
- Staffordshire County Constituency (2 members)
- Lichfield Borough Constituency
- Newcastle-under-Lyme Borough Constituency
- Stafford Borough Constituency

=== 1832-1885 ===
The county constituency was divided into:

- North Staffordshire
- South Staffordshire
- Walsall new Borough Constituency
- Wolverhampton new Borough Constituency

=== 1885-1918 ===
The county constituencies were divided into:

- Burton (still exists)
- Handsworth (until 1918 when it became a Birmingham constituency)
- Hanley (until 1950 when it was replaced by Stoke-on-Trent Central)
- Kingswinford (until 1950 when it was replaced by Brierley Hill)
- Leek (until 1983 when replaced by Staffordshire Moorlands)
- Lichfield (until 1950 when it was replaced by Lichfield and Tamworth)
- Newcastle-under-Lyme (still exists)
- Stafford (until 1950 when it was replaced by Stafford and Stone)
- Staffordshire North-West (until 1918)
- Staffordshire West (until 1918)
- Stoke-upon-Trent (until 1918)
- Tamworth (until 1950)
- Walsall (until 1955)
- Wednesbury (until 1974)
- West Bromwich (until 1974)
- Wolverhampton East (until 1950)
- Wolverhampton South (until 1918)
- Wolverhampton West (until 1950)

=== 1918-1950 ===
- Burslem (until 1950 when it was replaced by Stoke-on-Trent North)
- Burton (still exists)
- Cannock (created out of Kingswinford, West Staffordshire and Lichfield)
- Hanley (until 1950 when it was replaced by Stoke-on-Trent Central)
- Kingswinford (until 1950 when it was replaced by Brierley Hill)
- Leek (until 1983 when replaced by Staffordshire Moorlands)
- Lichfield (until 1950 when it was replaced by Lichfield and Tamworth)
- Newcastle-under-Lyme (still exists)
- Smethwick (until 1974 when it was replaced by Warley East)
- Stafford (until 1950 when it was replaced by Stafford and Stone)
- Stoke-on-Trent, Stoke (until 1950 when it was replaced by Stoke-on-Trent Central, Stoke-on-Trent North and Stoke-on-Trent South)
- Stone (until 1950 when it was replaced by Stafford and Stone)
- Tamworth (until 1950)
- Walsall (until 1955)
- Wednesbury (until 1974)
- West Bromwich (until 1974)
- Woverhampton Bilston (until 1974)
- Wolverhampton East (until 1950)
- Wolverhampton West (until 1950)

=== 1950-1983 ===
- Aldridge-Brownhills (since 1974, created out of Walsall North and Walsall South)
- Brierley Hill (until 1974)
- Burton (still exists)
- Cannock
- Leek
- Lichfield and Tamworth
- Newcastle-under-Lyme
- Smethwick (until 1974)
- South West Staffordshire (1974
- Stafford and Stone
- Stoke-on-Trent Central
- Stoke-on-Trent North
- Stoke-on-Trent South
- Walsall (until 1955)
- Walsall North (created out of Walsall in 1955)
- Walsall South (created out of Walsall in 1955)
- Wednesbury (until 1974)
- West Bromwich (until 1974)
- West Bromwich East (from 1974)
- West Bromwich West (from 1974)
- Wolverhampton Bilston (until 1974)
- Wolverhampton North East (from 1950)
- Wolverhampton South East (from 1974)
- Wolverhampton South West (from 1950)

=== 1983-1997 ===
- Burton
- Cannock and Burntwood
- Mid Staffordshire
- Newcastle-under-Lyme
- South Staffordshire
- South West Staffordshire
- Stafford
- Staffordshire Moorlands
- Stoke-on-Trent Central
- Stoke-on-Trent North
- Stoke-on-Trent South
- Stone

=== 1997 to 2024 ===
- Burton
- Cannock Chase
- Lichfield
- Newcastle-under-Lyme
- South Staffordshire
- Stafford
- Staffordshire Moorlands
- Stoke-on-Trent Central
- Stoke-on-Trent North
- Stoke-on-Trent South
- Stone
- Tamworth

== Boundary changes ==
=== 2024 ===
See 2023 review of Westminster constituencies for further details.

Former name	Boundaries 2010-2024	Current name	Boundaries 2024–present
1. Burton CC; 2. Cannock Chase CC; 3. Lichfield CC; 4. Newcastle-under-Lyme BC; 5. South Staffordshire CC; 6. Stafford CC; 7. Staffordshire Moorlands CC; 8. Stoke-on-Trent Central BC; 9. Stoke-on-Trent North BC; 10. Stoke-on-Trent South BC; 11. Stone CC; 12. Tamworth CC	2010-2024 constituencies in Staffordshire	1. Burton and Uttoxeter CC; 2. Cannock Chase CC; 3. Kingswinford and South Staffordshire CC; 4. Lichfield CC; 5. Newcastle-under-Lyme CC; 6. Stafford CC; 7. Staffordshire Moorlands CC; 8. Stoke-on-Trent Central BC; 9. Stoke-on-Trent North BC; 10. Stoke-on-Trent South CC; 11. Stone, Great Wyrley and Penkridge CC; 12. Tamworth CC	Current constituencies in Staffordshire

For the 2023 review of Westminster constituencies, which redrew the constituency map ahead of the 2024 United Kingdom general election, the Boundary Commission for England opted to combine Staffordshire with the Black Country as a sub-region of the West Midlands Region, resulting in the creation of a new cross-county boundary constituency named Kingswinford and South Staffordshire, which included part of the abolished constituency of South Staffordshire; remaining areas of this seat were combined with parts of the abolished constituency of Stone to form Stone, Great Wyrley and Penkridge. Although the seat was unchanged, Burton was renamed Burton and Uttoxeter.

The following constituencies are proposed:

Containing electoral wards from Cannock Chase

- Cannock Chase

Containing electoral wards from East Staffordshire

- Burton and Uttoxeter
- Lichfield (part)

Containing electoral wards from Lichfield

- Lichfield (part)
- Tamworth (part)

Containing electoral wards from Newcastle-under-Lyme

- Newcastle-under-Lyme
- Stafford (part)
- Stoke-on-Trent North (part)

Containing electoral wards from South Staffordshire

- Kingswinford and South Staffordshire (part also in the West Midlands metropolitan borough of Dudley)
- Stone, Great Wyrley and Penkridge (part)

Containing electoral wards from Stafford

- Stafford (part)
- Stoke-on-Trent South (part)
- Stone, Great Wyrley and Penkridge (part)

Containing electoral wards from Staffordshire Moorlands

- Staffordshire Moorlands
- Stoke-on-Trent South (part)

Containing electoral wards from Stoke-on-Trent

- Stoke-on-Trent Central
- Stoke-on-Trent North (part)
- Stoke-on-Trent South (part)

Containing electoral wards from Tamworth

- Tamworth (part)

=== 2010 ===
Under the fifth periodic review of Westminster constituencies, the Boundary Commission for England decided to retain the 12 constituencies covering Staffordshire for the 2010 election, making minor changes to realign constituency boundaries with the boundaries of current local government wards, and to reduce the electoral disparity between constituencies.

Name	Boundaries 1997-2010	Boundaries 2010–2024
1. Burton CC; 2. Cannock Chase CC; 3. Lichfield CC; 4. Newcastle-under-Lyme BC; 5. South Staffordshire CC; 6. Stafford CC; 7. Staffordshire Moorlands CC; 8. Stoke-on-Trent Central BC; 9. Stoke-on-Trent North BC; 10. Stoke-on-Trent South BC; 11. Stone CC; 12. Tamworth CC	Parliamentary constituencies in Staffordshire (1997–2010)	Parliamentary constituencies in Staffordshire (2010–2024)

== Results history ==
Primary data source: House of Commons research briefing - General election results from 1918 to 2019

=== 2024 ===
The number of votes cast for each political party who fielded candidates in constituencies comprising Staffordshire in the 2024 general election were as follows:

Party	Votes	%	Change from 2019	Seats	Change from 2019
Labour	183,181	35.4%	▲7.1%	9	▲9
Conservative	164,440	31.8%	▼29.8%	3	▼9
Reform	105,605	20.4%	▲19.3%	0	Steady
Greens	23,018	4.4%	▲1.3%	0	Steady
Liberal Democrats	21,396	4.1%	▼1.5%	0	Steady
Others	9,757	1.9%	▲1.5%	0	Steady
Total	517,614	100.0		12	

=== Percentage votes ===
Election year	1983	1987	1992	1997	2001	2005	2010	2015	2017	2019	2024
Labour	32.9	33.9	41.8	51.3	48.0	41.4	31.1	29.2	37.9	28.2	35.4
Conservative	44.9	44.9	44.0	33.7	35.9	35.2	41.6	45.7	56.3	61.6	31.8
Reform^{1}	-	-	-	-	-	-	-	-	-	1.1	20.4
Green Party	-	*	*	*	*	*	0.2	2.8	1.5	3.1	4.4
Liberal Democrat^{2}	22.1	21.1	13.4	10.7	12.5	15.5	17.9	3.6	3.1	5.6	4.1
UKIP	-	-	-	*	*	*	5.1	17.6	0.9	*	*
Other	0.1	0.2	0.9	4.2	3.6	7.8	4.1	1.2	0.3	0.4	1.9

^{1}2019 - Brexit Party
^{2}1983 & 1987 - SDP–Liberal Alliance

* Included in Other

=== Seats ===
Election year	1983	1987	1992	1997	2001	2005	2010	2015	2017	2019	2024
Labour	4	4	5	9	9	9	4	4	3	0	9
Conservative	7	7	6	3	3	3	8	8	9	12	3
Total	11	11	11	12	12	12	12	12	12	12	12

=== Maps ===
==== 1885-1910 ====
1885

1886

1892

1895

1900

1906

Jan 1910

Dec 1910

==== 1918-1945 ====
1918

1922

1923

1924

1929

1931

1935

1945

==== 1950-1979 ====
1950

1951

1955

1959

1964

1966

1970

Feb 1974

Oct 1974

1979

==== 1983-present ====
1983

1987

1992

1997

2001

2005

2010

2015

2017

2019

2024

== Historical representation by party ==
A cell marked → (with a different colour background to the preceding cell) indicates that the previous MP continued to sit under a new party name.

=== 1885 to 1918 ===
Conservative Labour Liberal Liberal-Labour Liberal Unionist National Party

Constituency	1885	1886	86	90	91	1892	93	1895	96	98	1900	05	1906	07	08	09	Jan 1910	Dec 1910	12	16
Burton	M. Bass		Evershed								Ratcliff								→	
Handsworth*	Wiggin	→				H. Meysey-Thompson							E. Meysey-Thompson						→	
Hanley	Woodall										Heath		Edwards			→			Outhwaite	
Kingswinford	A. Staveley Hill										Webb	H. Staveley-Hill								
Leek	Crompton	Davenport				Bill							Pearce				Heath	Pearce		
Lichfield	Swinburne					Darwin		Fulford	Warner											
Newcastle-under-Lyme	Allen	Coghill				Allen					Haslam		Wedgwood							
Stafford	C. McLaren	Salt				Shaw												Essex		
Staffordshire, North West	Leveson-Gower	Edwards-Heathcote				Heath							Billson	Stanley			→			Finney
Staffordshire, West	H. Bass	→								Henderson			H. McLaren				Lloyd		→	
Stoke-upon-Trent	Bright			Leveson-Gower				Coghill			→		Ward							
Walsall	Forster				Holden	James	Hayter	Gedge			Hayter		Dunne				Cooper			
Wednesbury	Lloyd	Stanhope				Lloyd		Green					Hyde				Norton-Griffiths			
West Bromwich	Blades	Spencer											Hazel				Legge			
Wolverhampton East	Fowler														Thorne					
Wolverhampton South	Villiers	→								Gibbons	Norman						Hickman			
Wolverhampton West	Hickman	Plowden				Hickman							Richards				Bird			

*Transferred to Warwickshire 1911

=== 1918 to 1950 ===
Coalition Labour Coalition Liberal (1918-22) / National Liberal (1922-23) Coalition National Democratic & Labour Conservative Constitutionalist Independent Labour Labour Liberal National Government National Labour National Liberal (1931-68) National Party New Party

Constituency	1918	19	22	1922	1923	1924	24	26	28	1929	31	1931	31	32	1935	38	41	42	43	44	1945	45
Burslem	Finney			MacLaren	Robinson	MacLaren						Allen	→		MacLaren						Davies	
Burton	J. Gretton																		J. F. Gretton		Lyne	
Cannock	J. Parker			Adamson								Ward			Adamson						Lee	
Hanley	Seddon			M. Parker		Clowes			Hollins			Hales			Hollins						Stross	
Kingswinford	Sitch											Todd			Henderson							
Leek	Bromfield											Ratcliffe			Bromfield						Davies	
Lichfield	Warner				Hodges	Wilson				Lovat-Fraser	→					Poole						
Newcastle-under-Lyme	Wedgwood	→																Mack				
Smethwick	Davison							O. Mosley			→	Wise									Dobbs	Gordon Walker
Stafford	Ormsby-Gore															Thorneycroft					Swingler	
Stoke	Ward				→	→	→			C. Mosley	→	Copeland			Smith							
Stone	Hill Child			Lamb																	Fraser	
Walsall	Cooper		→	Collins		Preston				McShane		Leckie	→			Schuster					Wells	
Wednesbury	Short											Ward		Banfield							Evans	
West Bromwich	Roberts											Ramsay			Roberts		Dugdale					
Wolverhampton Bilston	Hickman			Howard-Bury		Baker						Peto			Hannah					Gibbons	Nally	
Wolverhampton East	Thorne									Mander											Baird	
Wolverhampton West	A. Bird		R. Bird							Brown	→	R. Bird									Hughes	

=== 1950 to 1983 ===
The West Midlands Order 1965 transferred the Dudley area from Worcestershire to Staffordshire and part of the Warley area from Staffordshire to Worcestershire. These changes were incorporated into the new constituency boundaries for the February 1974 general election.

Conservative Labour

Constituency	1950	1951	53	1955	57	1959	63	1964	1966	67	69	1970	73	Feb 74	Oct 74	76	1979
Bilston / W'hampton SE ('74)	Nally			Edwards													
Brierley Hill / Staffs SW (1974)	Simmons					Talbot				Montgomery				Cormack			
Burton	Colegate			Jennings										Lawrence			
Cannock	Lee											Cormack		Roberts			
Leek	Davies											Knox					
Lichfield and Tamworth	Snow											J. d'Avigdor-Goldsmid			Grocott		Heddle
Newcastle-under-Lyme	Mack	Swingler									Golding						
Rowley Regis & Tipton / Dudley E ('74)	Henderson								Archer					Gilbert			
Smethwick / Warley East ('74)	Gordon Walker							Griffiths	Faulds								
Stafford and Stone	Fraser																
Stoke-on-Trent Central	Stross								Cant								
Stoke-on-Trent North	Davies		Slater						Forrester								
Stoke-on-Trent South	Smith								Ashley								
Walsall / Walsall North (1955)	Wells													Stonehouse		Hodgson	Winnick
Wednesbury / W. Brom. W ('74)	Evans				Stonehouse									Boothroyd			
West Bromwich / W. Brom. E ('74)	Dugdale						Foley						Boothroyd	Snape			
Wolverhampton North East	Baird							Short									
Wolverhampton South West	Powell													Budgen			
Walsall South				H. d'Avigdor-Goldsmid										George			
Aldridge-Brownhills														Edge			Shepherd
Dudley West														Phipps			Blackburn

=== 1983 to 2010 ===
Conservative Labour

Constituency	1983	84	86	1987	90	1992	96	1997	2001	2005
Burton	Lawrence							Dean		
Cannock and Burntwood / Cannock Chase (1997)	Howarth					Wright				
Mid Staffordshire / Lichfield (1997)	Heddle				Heal	Fabricant				
Newcastle-under-Lyme	J. Golding		L. Golding						Farrelly	
Stafford	Fraser	Cash						Kidney		
Staffordshire Moorlands	Knox							Atkins		
South East Staffordshire / Tamworth (1997)	Lightbown						Jenkins			
South Staffordshire	Cormack									
Stoke-on-Trent Central	Fisher									
Stoke-on-Trent North	Forrester			Walley						
Stoke-on-Trent South	Ashley					Stevenson				Flello
Stone								Cash		

=== 2010 to present ===
Conservative Independent Labour

Constituency	2010	2015	17	2017	18	18	2019	22	23	2024
Burton / Burton and Uttoxeter (2024)	Griffiths				→	→	Kniveton			Collier
Cannock Chase	Burley	Milling								Newbury
Lichfield	Fabricant									Robertson
Newcastle-under-Lyme	Farrelly						Bell			Jogee
S Staffordshire / Kingswinford & S Staffs ('24)	Williamson									Wood
Stafford	Lefroy						Clarke			Ingham
Staffordshire Moorlands	Bradley									
Stoke-on-Trent South	Flello			Brereton						Gardner
Stoke-on-Trent Central	Hunt		Snell				Gideon			Snell
Stoke-on-Trent North	Walley	Smeeth					Gullis			Williams
Stone / Stone, Great Wyrley & Penkridge ('24)	Cash									Williamson
Tamworth	Pincher							→	Edwards	

== See also ==
- Parliamentary constituencies in the West Midlands (region)
