= Staffordshire Moorlands (constituency) =

UK Parliament constituency (since 1983)

Coordinates: 53.09°N 1.98°W

- County constituency for the House of Commons
- Boundaries since 2024
- Boundary of Staffordshire Moorlands in West Midlands region
- County: Staffordshire
- Electorate: 69,892 (July 2024)
- Major settlements: Leek, Biddulph and Cheadle

Current constituency
- Created: 1983
- Member of Parliament: Karen Bradley (Conservative Party)
- Seats: One
- Created from: Leek

Staffordshire Moorlands is a constituency (Note: A county constituency (for the purposes of election expenses and type of returning officer)) represented in the House of Commons of the UK Parliament since 2010 by Karen Bradley, a Conservative who served as Secretary of State for Culture, Media and Sport between 2016 and 2018, before she became Secretary of State for Northern Ireland from 2018 to 2019. As with all constituencies, the constituency elects one Member of Parliament (MP) by the first past the post system of election at least every five years.

== Constituency profile ==
Leek with the Roaches in the background

Staffordshire Moorlands is a constituency in Staffordshire in the West Midlands region of England, covering most of the local government district of the same name. Its largest town is Leek, which has a population of around 20,000. Other settlements include the towns of Biddulph and Cheadle and the villages of Cheddleton and Werrington.

This is a large, rural constituency covering the towns and villages to the north-east of Stoke-on-Trent. The eastern third of the constituency is within the Peak District national park and consists of sparsely-populated moorland, from which the constituency gets its name. Leek is a market town with a history of textile manufacturing, whilst Biddulph and Cheadle are traditionally coal mining towns. The three towns have below-average levels of wealth whilst the rural villages are mostly affluent. The rural area contains a number of popular tourist attractions including Rudyard, Dovedale and Alton Towers, the UK's most-visited theme park. House prices across the constituency are generally lower than the rest of the West Midlands and considerably lower than the UK average.

Staffordshire Moorlands has a large retired population and low proportions of young and middle-aged adults. Residents have average levels of income, high rates of homeownership, and the child poverty rate is below-average. They generally have low levels of education and many are religious. A high proportion work in the agriculture, tourism and arts sectors, and the percentage claiming unemployment benefits is around half the UK-wide rate. White people made up 98% of the population at the 2021 census.

At the local district council, the towns are represented by the Labour Party whilst the rural areas mostly elected Conservatives. At the county council, which held elections more recently (in 2025), all seats in this constituency were won by Reform UK. Voters in Staffordshire Moorlands strongly supported leaving the European Union in the 2016 referendum; an estimated 65% voted in favour of Brexit compared to the UK-wide figure of 52%.

== Boundaries ==
1983–1997: The District of Staffordshire Moorlands.

1997–2010: The District of Staffordshire Moorlands wards of Alton, Biddulph East, Biddulph Moor, Biddulph North, Biddulph South, Biddulph West, Caverswall, Cheddleton, Horton, Ipstones, Leek North East, Leek North West, Leek South East, Leek South West, Leekfrith, Longnor, Warslow, Waterhouses, Werrington, and Wetley Rocks, and the Borough of Newcastle-under-Lyme wards of Butt Lane, Kidsgrove, Newchapel, and Talke.

2010–2024: The District of Staffordshire Moorlands wards of Alton, Bagnall and Stanley, Biddulph East, Biddulph Moor, Biddulph North, Biddulph South, Biddulph West, Brown Edge and Endon, Caverswall, Cellarhead, Cheddleton, Churnet, Dane, Hamps Valley, Horton, Ipstones, Leek East, Leek North, Leek South, Leek West, Manifold, and Werrington, and the Borough of Newcastle-under-Lyme ward of Newchapel.

2024–present: The District of Staffordshire Moorlands wards of: Alton; Bagnall and Stanley; Biddulph East; Biddulph Moor; Biddulph North; Biddulph South; Biddulph West; Brown Edge and Endon; Caverswall; Cellarhead; Cheadle North East; Cheadle South East; Cheadle West; Cheddleton; Churnet; Dane; Hamps Valley; Horton; Ipstones; Leek East; Leek North; Leek South; Leek West; Manifold; Werrington.

=== History of boundary changes ===
The constituency succeeded the former constituency of Leek at the 1983 general election.

The boundary changes which took effect at the 1997 general election proved to be among the most controversial of all those proposed by the Boundary Commission. Initially only minor changes were to be made: two rural wards to transfer to Stone (newly created). However, in the same proposed boundary changes, the neighbouring community of Kidsgrove had been split between two constituencies, with two wards remaining in the constituency of Stoke-on-Trent North and two wards transferring to Newcastle-under-Lyme. At the local enquiry into the changes, it was argued that this division of Kidsgrove was unacceptable and the assistant commissioner consequently recommended that all four Kidsgrove wards be transferred instead to Staffordshire Moorlands. To make way for the 19,000 voters in Kidsgrove (to that date shown to be heavily Labour-supporting, two wards, Endon & Stanley and Brown Edge, were transferred to Stoke-on-Trent North, while two more rural wards were transferred to the Stone constituency. It was estimated that if the constituency had been fought on the pre-1997 boundaries, Charlotte Atkins would have gained the seat by a majority of about 1,500 votes.

The boundary changes which took effect at the 2010 general election effectively reversed these changes: four of the five Kidsgrove wards transferred to Stoke-on-Trent North, with only one mainly rural ward, Newchapel, remaining in Staffordshire Moorlands. Brown Edge and Endon & Stanley returned to Staffordshire Moorlands. It was estimated that if the constituency had been fought at the 2005 election under the current boundaries, Labour would have lost the seat by 1,035 votes as opposed to the 2,438 votes that Charlotte Atkins won on that occasion.

Further to the 2023 Periodic Review of Westminster constituencies which came into effect for the 2024 general election, the town of Cheadle was added from the abolished constituency of Stone in order to bring the electorate within the permitted range. The Borough of Newcastle-under-Lyme ward of Newchapel was transferred to Stoke-on-Trent North.

== History ==
The forerunner seat, Leek, existed for nearly a century until 1983, and in its more recent history alternated between the Labour and Conservative parties three times after a Liberal had held the seat from 1910 until 1918. Despite this alternation, it was far from a bellwether (that is, a reflection of the national result), as Leek leaned more towards one party more than the other in two phases:

In the first, longer part of this period the seat was held mainly by William Bromfield (Lab), secretary of the Amalgamated Society of Textile Workers and Kindred Trades (ASTWKT), whose membership covered Staffordshire and South Cheshire, and then by the future Harold Davies (later Baron Davies of Leek), who as the main aide to Prime Minister Harold Wilson, was tasked with secret talks with Ho Chi Minh which failed due to a leak.

In the second part of this period David Knox, a pro-European Conservative, toward the left of his party, and a supporter of Ted Heath when he faced Margaret Thatcher's leadership challenge, helped to establish the Tory Reform Group. During his long tenure as MP for Leek, then Staffordshire Moorlands until 1997 he held the seat even during the Wilson-Callaghan government.

From its creation in 1983 this seat was indeed a bellwether for the national result, until 2024 when the seat remained Conservative despite the landslide majority for the Labour Party nationally. After Knox's retirement for the 1997 election, Charlotte Atkins held the seat for Labour until 2010 when it was captured by the current incumbent, Karen Bradley. There was a swing to the Conservatives in four consecutive elections (2010, 2015 and 2017, 2019), leading to a Conservative majority of over 37% in this seat in 2019. The majority reduced at the 2024 general election to less than 3%, when Bradley was re-elected with a reduced majority of 1,175 votes. Bradley served in the cabinet of both of Theresa May's governments, but returned to the backbenches after Boris Johnson became prime minister.

== Members of Parliament ==
Leek prior to 1983

Election	Member	Party	Cabinet Positions
1983	David Knox	Conservative	
1997	Charlotte Atkins	Labour	
2010	Karen Bradley	Conservative	Secretary of State for Culture, Media and Sport (2016–2018); Secretary of State for Northern Ireland (2018–2019)

== Elections ==
=== Elections in the 2020s ===
General election 2024: Staffordshire Moorlands
Party	Candidate	Votes	%	±%
Conservative	Karen Bradley	15,310	35.4	−28.7
Labour	Alastair Watson	14,135	32.6	+5.9
Reform	Dave Poole	10,065	23.2	N/A
Green	Helen Stead	2,293	5.3	+2.2
Liberal Democrats	Graham Oakes	1,499	3.5	−2.6
Majority		1,175	2.8	−34.6
Turnout		43,302	62.0	−5.3
Conservative hold		Swing	−17.3	

=== Elections in the 2010s ===
General election 2019: Staffordshire Moorlands
Party	Candidate	Votes	%	±%
Conservative	Karen Bradley	28,192	64.5	+6.4
Labour	Darren Price	11,764	26.9	−7.0
Liberal Democrats	Andrew Gant	2,469	5.7	+2.4
Green	Douglas Rouxel	1,231	2.8	+1.6
Majority		16,428	37.6	+13.4
Turnout		43,656	66.7	−0.9
Conservative hold		Swing	+6.7	

General election 2017: Staffordshire Moorlands
Party	Candidate	Votes	%	±%
Conservative	Karen Bradley	25,963	58.1	+7.0
Labour	Dave Jones	15,133	33.9	+6.7
Independent	Nicholas Sheldon	1,524	3.4	New
Liberal Democrats	Henry Jebb	1,494	3.3	−0.8
Green	Mike Shone	541	1.2	−1.7
Majority		10,830	24.2	+0.3
Turnout		42,713	67.6	
Conservative hold		Swing	+0.15	

General election 2015: Staffordshire Moorlands
Party	Candidate	Votes	%	±%
Conservative	Karen Bradley	21,770	51.1	+5.9
Labour	Trudie McGuinness	11,596	27.2	−2.7
UKIP	George Langley-Poole	6,236	14.6	+6.4
Liberal Democrats	John Redfern	1,759	4.1	−12.6
Green	Brian Smith	1,226	2.9	New
Majority		10,174	23.9	+8.6
Turnout		42,587		
Conservative hold		Swing	+4.3	

General election 2010: Staffordshire Moorlands
Party	Candidate	Votes	%	±%
Conservative	Karen Bradley	19,793	45.2	+5.4
Labour	Charlotte Atkins	13,104	29.9	−6.0
Liberal Democrats	Henry Jebb	7,338	16.7	−0.8
UKIP	Steve Povey	3,580	8.2	+1.4
Majority		6,689	15.3	
Turnout		43,815	70.6	+2.8
Conservative hold		Swing	+5.7	

Although its predecessor seat was narrowly retained by Labour in 2005, intervening boundary changes made the constituency notionally Conservative prior to the 2010 general election, and it is therefore listed as a hold rather than a gain.

=== Elections in the 2000s ===
General election 2005: Staffordshire Moorlands
Party	Candidate	Votes	%	±%
Labour	Charlotte Atkins	18,126	41.0	−8.0
Conservative	Marcus Hayes	15,688	35.5	+0.2
Liberal Democrats	John Fisher	6,927	15.7	+1.8
UKIP	Stephen Povey	3,512	7.9	+6.1
Majority		2,438	5.5	−8.2
Turnout		44,253	64.0	+0.1
Labour hold		Swing	−4.1	

General election 2001: Staffordshire Moorlands
Party	Candidate	Votes	%	±%
Labour	Charlotte Atkins	20,904	49.0	−3.2
Conservative	Marcus Hayes	15,066	35.3	+2.7
Liberal Democrats	John Redfern	5,928	13.9	+1.8
UKIP	Paul Gilbert	760	1.8	New
Majority		5,838	13.7	−5.9
Turnout		42,658	63.9	−13.9
Labour hold		Swing	−3.0	

=== Elections in the 1990s ===
General election 1997: Staffordshire Moorlands
Party	Candidate	Votes	%	±%
Labour	Charlotte Atkins	26,686	52.2	+17.4
Conservative	Andrew Ashworth	16,637	32.6	−14.0
Liberal Democrats	Christina Jebb	6,191	12.1	−2.8
Referendum	David Stanworth	1,603	3.1	New
Majority		10,049	19.6	
Turnout		51,117	77.8	−5.9
Labour gain from Conservative		Swing	+15.7	

General election 1992: Staffordshire Moorlands
Party	Candidate	Votes	%	±%
Conservative	David Knox	29,240	46.6	−6.3
Labour	JE Siddelley	21,830	34.8	+6.0
Liberal Democrats	CR Jebb	9,326	14.9	−3.4
Anti-Federalist League	MC Howson	2,121	3.4	New
Natural Law	P Davies	261	0.4	New
Majority		7,410	11.8	−12.3
Turnout		62,778	83.7	+3.3
Conservative hold		Swing	−6.2	

=== Elections in the 1980s ===
General election 1987: Staffordshire Moorlands
Party	Candidate	Votes	%	±%
Conservative	David Knox	31,613	52.9	−0.9
Labour	Vera Ivers	17,186	28.8	+4.6
SDP	James Corbett	10,950	18.3	−3.8
Majority		14,427	24.1	−5.5
Turnout		59,749	80.4	+3.2
Conservative hold		Swing		

General election 1983: Staffordshire Moorlands
Party	Candidate	Votes	%	±%
Conservative	David Knox	30,079	53.8	
Labour	Brian Campbell	13,513	24.2	
SDP	Paul Gubbins	12,370	22.1	
Majority		16,566	29.6	
Turnout		55,962	77.2	
Conservative win (new seat)				

== See also ==
- List of parliamentary constituencies in Staffordshire
- List of parliamentary constituencies in West Midlands (region)
