= Harry Davenport =

Harry Davenport may refer to:

- Harry Davenport (actor) (1866–1949), American film and stage actor
- Harry Davenport (footballer) (1900–1984), Australian footballer
- Harry J. Davenport (1902–1977), Democratic Party member of the U.S. House of Representatives from Pennsylvania
- Harry Davenport (British politician) (1833–1895), British barrister and member of parliament
- Harry Bromley Davenport (born 1950), English film director and producer

== See also ==
- Harold Davenport (1907–1969), mathematician
