= Stone (constituency) =

UK Parliament constituency (1997–2024)

- Former county constituency for the House of Commons
- Boundary of Stone in Staffordshire

- Location of Staffordshire within England
- County: Staffordshire
- Electorate: 66,729 (December 2010)

1997–2024
- Seats: One
- Created from: Stafford, Staffordshire Moorlands, Mid Staffordshire
- Replaced by: Stone, Great Wyrley and Penkridge

1918–1950
- Seats: One
- Type of constituency: County constituency
- Created from: North West Staffordshire, West Staffordshire, Leek and Burton
- Replaced by: Stafford and Stone

Stone was a constituency (Note: A county constituency (for the purposes of election expenses and type of returning officer)) in Staffordshire in the House of Commons of the UK Parliament. It was represented since its 1997 recreation by Sir William Cash, a Conservative. (Note: As with all constituencies, the constituency elects one Member of Parliament (MP) by the first past the post system of election at least every five years.) On 9 June 2023, he announced his intention to stand down at the 2024 general election.

Further to the completion of the 2023 review of Westminster constituencies, the seat was abolished. Subject to moderate boundary changes, it was reformed as Stone, Great Wyrley and Penkridge, and first contested at the 2024 general election.

== Constituency profile ==
This was a mostly rural seat to the south of the Stoke-on-Trent conurbation. Electoral Calculus described the seat as "Strong Right" characterised by retired, socially conservative voters who strongly supported Brexit.

== Boundaries ==
Map of boundaries 2010–2024

Stone was in the top decile in geographical size in England. It covered the area from Madeley in the north to the west of Newcastle-under-Lyme, then ran south and out to the outskirts of Market Drayton, running down to the northern edge of Newport. The boundary headed north alongside the western boundary of Stafford around the north of Stafford and down its eastern boundary. It ran across the north of Abbots Bromley before reaching its eastern end. It continued to the west of Uttoxeter in the Burton constituency. It then extended eastwards between the Burton constituency and up to Cheadle and to the south of Stoke-on-Trent. The towns of Eccleshall, Cheadle and Stone were within the constituency.

2010–2024: The Borough of Stafford wards of Barlaston and Oulton, Chartley, Church Eaton, Eccleshall, Fulford, Gnosall and Woodseaves, Milwich, St Michael's, Stonefield and Christchurch, Swynnerton, and Walton, the District of Staffordshire Moorlands wards of Cheadle North East, Cheadle South East, Cheadle West, Checkley, and Forsbrook, and the Borough of Newcastle-under-Lyme wards of Loggerheads and Whitmore, and Madeley.

1997–2010: The Borough of Stafford wards of Barlaston, Chartley, Church Eaton, Eccleshall, Fulford, Gnosall, Milwich, Oulton, St Michael's, Stonefield and Christchurch, Swynnerton, Walton, and Woodseaves, the District of Staffordshire Moorlands wards of Alton, Cheadle North East, Cheadle South East, Cheadle West, Checkley, Forsbrook, and Kingsley, and the Borough of Newcastle-under-Lyme wards of Loggerheads, Madeley, and Whitmore.

1918–1950: The Urban District of Stone, and the Rural Districts of Blore Heath, Cheadle, Mayfield, Newcastle-under-Lyme, and Stone.

There were various alterations to the constituency shape in boundary changes put in place for the 2010 general election. Stone took the areas covered by the Bradley, and Salt and Enson civil parish from the neighbouring Stafford constituency. In turn, the parishes of Hixon, Ellenhall, and Ranton, were moved back from Stone to Stafford. In the largest alteration, the north-eastern parishes covering Kingsley, Oakamoor, Alton, Farley, and Cotton, were all moved to the altered Staffordshire Moorlands.

From the 2024 general election, the constituency was merged with parts of the current South Staffordshire and Dudley South constituencies to form the new constituency of Stone, Great Wyrley and Penkridge. Gavin Williamson, MP for South Staffordshire, stood as the Conservative candidate in place of Bill Cash who announced his retirement from the House of Commons in June 2023.

== History ==
The earlier constituency of the same name that existed 1918-1950 elected Conservatives, all three officers who had fought with some distinction in either of the two World Wars.

A new Stone constituency was created for the 1997 general election, when Parliament approved for Staffordshire the additional seat proposed by the Boundary Commission. The constituency was formed from parts of the Stafford, Staffordshire Moorlands and Mid Staffordshire.

Presenting a safe seat for the Conservatives and proving to be one, its creation reduced the Conservative majority in the Staffordshire Moorlands and Stafford constituencies, both of which were gained by a Labour Party member at the 1997 general election.

== Abolition ==
Further to the completion of the 2023 review of Westminster constituencies, the seat was abolished prior to the 2024 general election, with its contents distributed to a newly created seat and four neighbouring constituencies:

- The town of Stone to the new constituency of Stone, Great Wyrley and Penkridge
- The villages of Checkley, Forsbrook, Barlaston, Fulford, Swynnerton and Oulton to Stoke on Trent South
- The town of Cheadle to Staffordshire Moorlands
- Western rural areas, including the town of Eccleshall, to Stafford
- The village of Madeley to Newcastle-under-Lyme

== Members of Parliament ==
=== MPs 1918–1950 ===
Election	Member	Party
1918	Sir Smith Child, Bt.	Coalition Conservative
1922	Sir Joseph Lamb	Conservative
1945	Hugh Fraser	Conservative
1950	Constituency abolished	

=== MPs 1997–2024 ===
Election	Member	Party
1997	Sir Bill Cash	Conservative

== Elections ==
=== Elections in the 2010s ===
General election 2019: Stone
Party	Candidate	Votes	%	±%
Conservative	Bill Cash	31,687	63.6	+0.4
Labour	Mike Stubbs	11,742	23.6	−4.6
Liberal Democrats	Alec Sandiford	4,412	8.9	+4.5
Green	Tom Adamson	2,002	4.0	+2.6
Majority		19,945	40.0	+5.0
Turnout		49,843	71.8	−2.0
Conservative hold		Swing	+2.6	

General election 2017: Stone
Party	Candidate	Votes	%	±%
Conservative	Bill Cash	31,614	63.2	+8.5
Labour Co-op	Sam Hale	14,119	28.2	+8.0
Liberal Democrats	Martin Lewis	2,222	4.4	−0.9
UKIP	Edward Whitfield	1,370	2.7	−13.5
Green	Sam Pancheri	707	1.4	−1.1
Majority		17,495	35.0	+0.5
Turnout		50,032	73.8	+3.7
Conservative hold		Swing	+0.2	

General election 2015: Stone
Party	Candidate	Votes	%	±%
Conservative	Bill Cash	25,733	54.7	+4.1
Labour	Sam Hale	9,483	20.2	−0.5
UKIP	Andrew Illsley	7,620	16.2	+10.9
Liberal Democrats	Martin Lewis	2,473	5.3	−17.1
Green	Wenslie Naylon	1,191	2.5	+1.5
Independent	John Coutouvidis	531	1.1	New
Majority		16,250	34.5	+6.3
Turnout		47,031	70.1	−0.4
Conservative hold		Swing		

General election 2010: Stone
Party	Candidate	Votes	%	±%
Conservative	Bill Cash	23,890	50.6	+2.2
Liberal Democrats	Christine Tinker	10,598	22.4	+3.8
Labour	Joanne Lewis	9,770	20.7	−9.0
UKIP	Andrew Illsley	2,481	5.3	+2.0
Green	Damon Hoppe	490	1.0	New
Majority		13,292	28.2	+8.9
Turnout		47,229	70.5	+3.5
Conservative hold		Swing	−0.8	

=== Elections in the 2000s ===
General election 2005: Stone
Party	Candidate	Votes	%	±%
Conservative	Bill Cash	22,733	48.3	−0.8
Labour	Mark Davis	13,644	29.0	−6.8
Liberal Democrats	Richard Stevens	9,111	19.4	+4.3
UKIP	Mike Nattrass	1,548	3.3	New
Majority		9,089	19.3	+6.0
Turnout		47,036	66.9	+0.6
Conservative hold		Swing	+3.0	

General election 2001: Stone
Party	Candidate	Votes	%	±%
Conservative	Bill Cash	22,395	49.1	+2.3
Labour	John Palfreyman	16,359	35.8	−3.8
Liberal Democrats	Brendan McKeown	6,888	15.1	+3.1
Majority		6,036	13.3	+6.1
Turnout		45,642	66.3	−12.5
Conservative hold		Swing		

=== Election in the 1990s ===
General election 1997: Stone
Party	Candidate	Votes	%	±%
Conservative	Bill Cash	24,859	46.8	
Labour	John Wakefield	21,041	39.6	
Liberal Democrats	Barry Stamp	6,392	12.0	
Liberal	Ann Winfield	545	1.0	
Natural Law	Dinah Grice	237	0.4	
Majority		3,818	7.2	
Turnout		53,074	77.8	
Conservative win (new seat)				

=== Election in the 1940s ===
General election 1945: Stone
Party	Candidate	Votes	%	±%
Conservative	Hugh Fraser	20,279	42.9	−18.1
Labour	W Simcock	18,173	38.4	−0.6
Liberal	John Wedgwood	8,853	18.7	New
Majority		2,106	4.5	−17.5
Turnout		47,305	72.6	+6.3
Conservative hold		Swing		

=== Elections in the 1930s ===
General election 1935: Stone
Party	Candidate	Votes	%	±%
Conservative	Joseph Lamb	20,498	61.0	−1.1
Labour	WI Simcock	13,099	39.0	+20.7
Majority		7,399	22.0	−20.5
Turnout		33,597	66.3	−8.3
Conservative hold		Swing		

General election 1931: Stone
Party	Candidate	Votes	%	±%
Conservative	Joseph Lamb	20,327	62.1	+22.1
Liberal	Walter Meakin	6,407	19.6	−8.7
Labour	WI Simcock	5,993	18.3	−9.4
Majority		13,920	42.5	+26.8
Turnout		32,727	74.6	−2.3
Conservative hold		Swing		

=== Elections in the 1920s ===
General election 1929: Stone
Party	Candidate	Votes	%	±%
Unionist	Joseph Lamb	13,965	44.0	−13.3
Liberal	Walter Meakin	8,975	28.3	+4.5
Labour	George Belt	8,792	27.7	+8.8
Majority		4,990	15.7	−17.8
Turnout		31,732	76.9	+2.0
Registered electors		41,268		
Unionist hold		Swing	−8.9	

General election 1924: Stone
Party	Candidate	Votes	%	±%
Unionist	Joseph Lamb	12,856	57.3	+6.5
Liberal	Walter Meakin	5,351	23.8	−25.4
Labour	C.A. Brook	4,245	18.9	New
Majority		7,505	33.5	+31.9
Turnout		22,452	74.9	+7.4
Registered electors		29,994		
Unionist hold		Swing	+16.0	

General election 1923: Stone
Party	Candidate	Votes	%	±%
Unionist	Joseph Lamb	10,001	50.8	+12.5
Liberal	Walter Meakin	9,687	49.2	+13.5
Majority		314	1.6	−1.0
Turnout		19,688	67.5	−3.9
Registered electors		29,151		
Unionist hold		Swing	−0.5	

General election 1922: Stone
Party	Candidate	Votes	%	±%
Unionist	Joseph Lamb	7,742	38.3	−8.4
Liberal	George Townsend	7,198	35.7	+1.3
Agriculturalist	W.L. Steel	5,243	26.0	+7.1
Majority		544	2.6	−9.7
Turnout		20,183	71.4	+9.4
Registered electors		28,273		
Unionist hold		Swing	−4.9	

=== Election in the 1910s ===
General election 1918: Stone
Party		Candidate	Votes	%	±%
C	Unionist	Smith Child	7,568	46.7	
	Liberal	George Townsend	5,573	34.4	
	Agriculturalist	Joseph Lamb	3,056	18.9	
Majority			1,995	12.3	
Turnout			16,197	62.0	
Registered electors			26,113		
	Unionist win (new seat)				
C indicates candidate endorsed by the coalition government.

== See also ==
- Parliamentary constituencies in Staffordshire

== Sources ==
- Craig, F. W. S. (1983) [1969]. British parliamentary election results 1918–1949 (3rd ed.). Chichester: Parliamentary Research Services. ISBN 0-900178-06-X.
- Iain Dale, ed. (2003). The Times House of Commons 1929, 1931, 1935. Politico's (reprint). ISBN 1-84275-033-X.
- The Times House of Commons 1945. 1945.
