= William Stubbs (trade unionist) =

British trade union leader

William Stubbs (1835 or 1836 – 16 March 1914) was a British trade union leader.

Stubbs grew up in Leek, Staffordshire, and became a shoemaker. He was a supporter of trade unionism, and became the secretary of the Silk Dyers’ General Society in the town, and by 1872 was also the secretary of the Silk Twisters' Society by 1872, while remaining a shoemaker. He was also active in the Ancient Order of Foresters.

In 1872, the unions put in a claim for a 10% wage increase, which they stated would still leave them earning less than other workers in the industry had already received. This was denied, and so Stubbs led a strike, increasing the demand to a 20% increase with extra for overtime. When the owners offered 10%, Stubbs persuaded the union to settle. He remained leader of the unions, which declined in membership.

In 1884, the Amalgamated Society of Silk Pickers was established, and Stubbs also became its secretary. This was followed by the foundation of the Amalgamated Society of Winders, Fillers and Braid Makers in 1889, the Amalgamated Society of Silk Spinners and Throwsters in 1890, and the Amalgamated Society of Female Silk Operatives in 1892, Stubbs leading them all. Yet all these unions remained very small, membership in 1892 ranging from 230 for the Pickers, down to 33 for the Spinners. The Dyers dissolved at some point, and a new Leek Amalgamated Society of Silk and Cotton Dyers was established in 1897, again under Stubbs' leadership. Stubbs also served on Leek Board of Guardians from 1901 to 1907, and 1908 onwards.

William Bromfield came to prominence in the Leek union movement, and began taking over as leader of many of the unions. By 1907, Stubbs was secretary only of the Twisters and the Pickers. He supported the formation of the Leek Textile Federation that year, and was nominated as its secretary, and was defeated by Bromfield. He died in 1914, still in office.
