= Secretary of State for Digital, Culture, Media and Sport =

Member of the Cabinet of the United Kingdom

- Royal Arms of His Majesty's Government

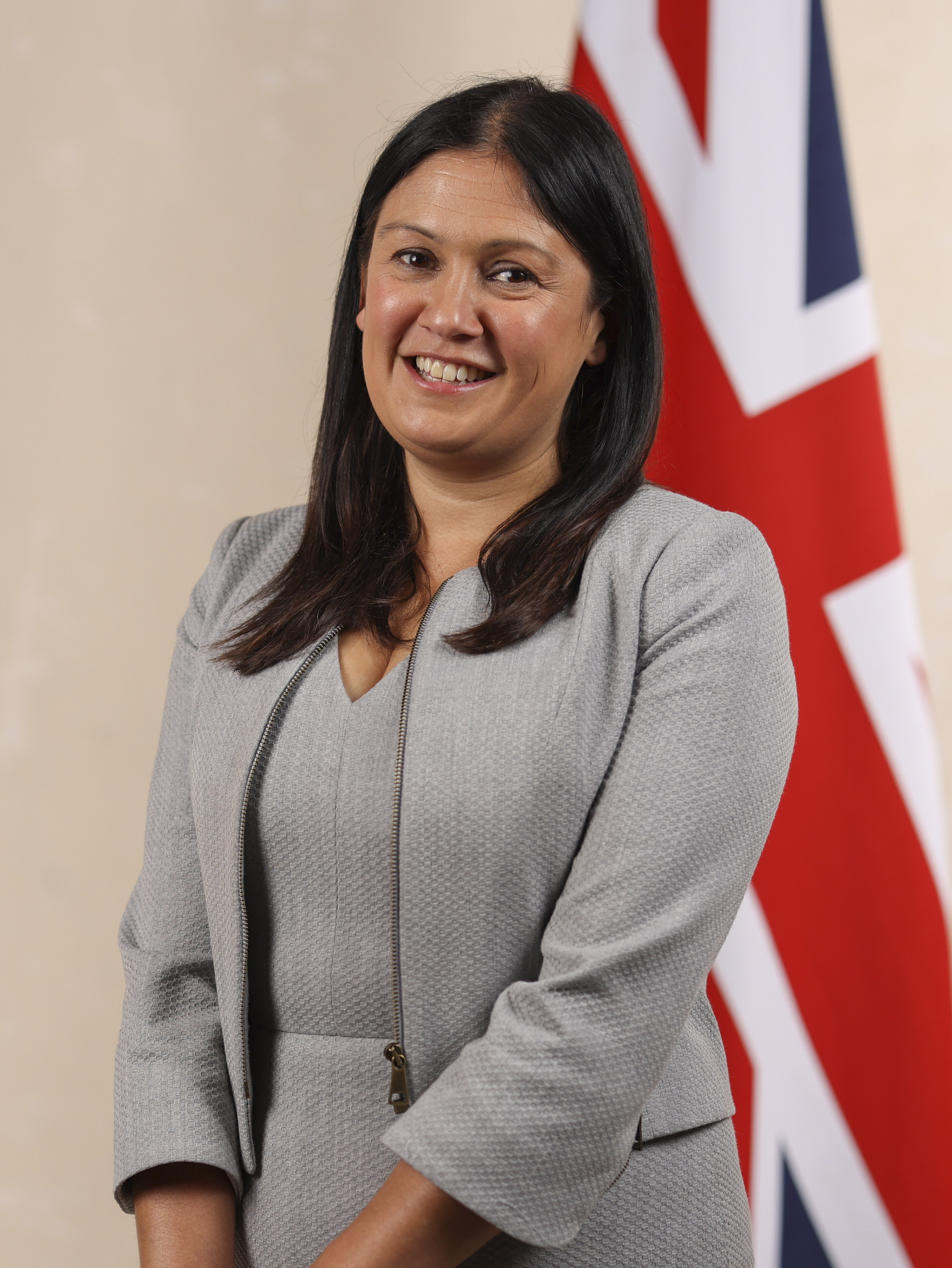
- Incumbent; Lisa Nandy since 5 July 2024
- Department for Digital, Culture, Media and Sport
- Style: Culture Secretary (informal); The Right Honourable (within the UK and Commonwealth)
- Type: Minister of the Crown
- Status: Secretary of State
- Member of: Cabinet; Privy Council
- Reports to: The Prime Minister
- Seat: Westminster
- Nominator: The Prime Minister
- Appointer: The Monarch; (on the advice of the Prime Minister)
- Term length: At His Majesty's Pleasure
- Formation: 11 April 1992: (as Secretary of State for National Heritage); 7 February 2023: (as Secretary of State for Culture, Media and Sport); 20 July 2026 (As Secretary of State for Digital, Culture, Media and Sport)
- First holder: David Mellor (as Secretary of State for National Heritage)
- Salary: £159,038 per annum (2022) (including £86,584 MP salary)
- Website: www.gov.uk/government/ministers/secretary-of-state-for-digital-culture-media-and-sport--2

The secretary of state for digital, culture, media and sport, also referred to as the culture secretary, is a secretary of state in the Government of the United Kingdom, with overall responsibility for strategy and policy across the Department for Digital, Culture, Media and Sport, which operates mainly in England. The incumbent is a member of the Cabinet of the United Kingdom. The office has been dubbed "Minister of Fun".

== Responsibilities ==
The secretary has overall responsibility for strategy and policy across the Department for Digital, Culture, Media and Sport. Its responsibilities in England, and some UK-wide, include:

- Arts and Culture
- Broadcasting
- Creative industries
- Creative Industries Council
- Cultural property, heritage and the historic environment
- Cultural Renewal Taskforce
- Culture, sports and arts sector recovery from COVID-19
- Gambling and racing
- Libraries
- Media ownership and mergers
- Museums and galleries
- The National Lottery
- Sport
- Tourism

== History ==
The office was created in 1992 by Prime Minister John Major, as Secretary of State for National Heritage. In his autobiography, Major says that, before the office was created, responsibility for cultural interests was shared among various departments, but important to none of them. For instance, arts and libraries, although a separate department, had no minister in the Cabinet, sport was part of the Department for Education, film was part of the Department of Trade and Industry, broadcasting was part of the Home Office, tourism was part of the Department for Employment and heritage was part of the Department of the Environment. He also wrote that the system tended to favour the interests of the articulate and well-connected London-based arts lobby.

Thus, when he became Prime Minister, Major said that he saw that the only way to give culture and sport the higher profile that he thought that they deserved was to establish a new department, under a minister of Cabinet rank, to bring together all aspects of the arts, sport and heritage.

== List of secretaries of state ==
=== Secretary of State for National Heritage (1992–1997) ===
Secretary of State	Term of office		Party	Prime Minister
David Mellor; MP for Putney	11 April 1992	22 September 1992	Conservative	John Major
Peter Brooke; MP for Cities of London and Westminster	25 September 1992	20 July 1994	Conservative	John Major
Stephen Dorrell; MP for Loughborough	20 July 1994	5 July 1995	Conservative	John Major
Virginia Bottomley; MP for South West Surrey	5 July 1995	2 May 1997	Conservative	John Major
Chris Smith; MP for Islington South and Finsbury	2 May 1997	22 July 1997	Labour	Tony Blair

=== Secretary of State for Culture, Media and Sport (1997–2010) ===
Secretary of State	Term of office		Party	Prime Minister
Chris Smith; MP for Islington South and Finsbury	22 July 1997	8 June 2001	Labour	Tony Blair
Tessa Jowell; MP for Dulwich and West Norwood	8 June 2001	28 June 2007	Labour	Tony Blair
James Purnell; MP for Stalybridge and Hyde	28 June 2007	24 January 2008	Labour	Gordon Brown
Andy Burnham; MP for Leigh	24 January 2008	5 June 2009	Labour	Gordon Brown
Ben Bradshaw; MP for Exeter	5 June 2009	11 May 2010	Labour	Gordon Brown

=== Secretary of State for Culture, Olympics, Media and Sport (2010 - 2012) ===
Secretary of State	Term of office		Party	Prime Minister
Jeremy Hunt; MP for South West Surrey	12 May 2010	4 September 2012	Conservative	David Cameron

=== Secretaries of State for Culture, Media and Sport (2012–2017) ===
Secretary of State	Term of office		Party	Prime Minister
Maria Miller; MP for Basingstoke	4 September 2012	9 April 2014	Conservative	David Cameron
Sajid Javid; MP for Bromsgrove	9 April 2014	11 May 2015	Conservative	David Cameron
John Whittingdale; MP for Maldon	11 May 2015	14 July 2016	Conservative	David Cameron
Karen Bradley; MP for Staffordshire Moorlands	14 July 2016	3 July 2017	Conservative	Theresa May
In 2017 the DCMS was renamed to the Department for Digital, Culture, Media and Sport in acknowledgement of the increasing responsibility the department had gained for Digital affairs. Karen Bradley continued as Secretary of State for the department.

=== Secretaries of State for Digital, Culture, Media and Sport (2017–2023) ===
Secretary of State	Term of office		Party	Prime Minister
Karen Bradley; MP for Staffordshire Moorlands	3 July 2017	8 January 2018	Conservative	Theresa May
Matt Hancock; MP for West Suffolk	8 January 2018	8 July 2018	Conservative	Theresa May
Jeremy Wright; MP for Kenilworth and Southam	9 July 2018	24 July 2019	Conservative	Theresa May
Nicky Morgan; MP for Loughborough (until November 2019); Life peer (since January 2020)	24 July 2019	13 February 2020	Conservative	Boris Johnson
Oliver Dowden; MP for Hertsmere	13 February 2020	15 September 2021	Conservative	Boris Johnson
Nadine Dorries; MP for Mid Bedfordshire	15 September 2021	6 September 2022	Conservative	Boris Johnson
Michelle Donelan; MP for Chippenham	6 September 2022	7 February 2023	Conservative	Liz Truss
Michelle Donelan; MP for Chippenham	6 September 2022	7 February 2023	Conservative	Rishi Sunak

=== Secretaries of State for Culture, Media and Sport (2023–2026) ===
Secretary of State	Term of office		Party	Prime Minister
Lucy Frazer; MP for South East Cambridgeshire	7 February 2023	5 July 2024	Conservative	Rishi Sunak
Lisa Nandy; MP for Wigan	5 July 2024	20 July 2026	Labour	Keir Starmer

=== Secretaries of State for Digital, Culture, Media and Sport (2026–present) ===
Secretary of State	Term of office		Party	Prime Minister
Lisa Nandy; MP for Wigan	20 July 2026	Incumbent	Labour	Andy Burnham

== See also ==
- Shadow Secretary of State for Culture, Media and Sport
- Culture, Media and Sport Committee
