= Herbert Richard Peel =

English cricketer and clergyman

Herbert Peel
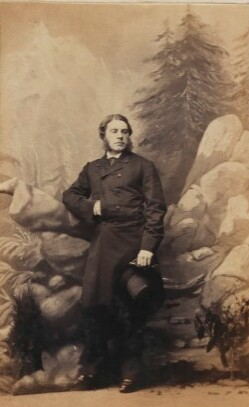
- Peel photographed in 1862

Personal information
- Full name: Herbert Richard Peel
- Born: 8 February 1831; Canterbury, Kent, England
- Died: 2 June 1885 (aged 54); Thornton, Buckinghamshire, England

Domestic team information
- Years: Team
- 1851–1852: Oxford University
- 1851–1852: Kent

Reverend Herbert Richard Peel (1831–1885) was an English clergyman and cricketer. He played for Oxford University and Kent County Cricket Club. He also worked to popularise apiculture.

== Life ==
He was the son of John Peel (1798–1875), at the time of his birth a prebendary of Canterbury Cathedral then later Dean of Worcester, and his wife Augusta Swinfen (1794–1861); Robert Peel the prime minister of the United Kingdom, was his uncle. He was educated at Eton College, under Edward Craven Hawtrey as headmaster, and then spent two years as a private pupil of the Rev. Henry Drury, at Bremhill. He matriculated in 1849 at Christ Church, Oxford, where he graduated B.A, in 1853, and M.A. in 1856.

Peel became a priest in the Church of England, ordained in 1854 and initially a curate at Hallow, Worcestershire to 1855. He was then curate at Charlecote. In 1860 he was appointed by his father as rector of Handsworth, an industrial town then in Staffordshire. Retiring from the ministry in 1873, he spent two years travelling, in poor health with rheumatic fever.

In 1875 Peel's father died, and he went to live at Abbot's Hill in Hertfordshire. Soon afterwards he became involved with the British Bee-Keepers' Association. In 1882 he moved to Thornton Hall, Buckinghamshire.

== Death ==
On 2 July 1885, Peel shot himself in Thornton Hall. His will, proved in London on 28 July, left a personal estate of £97,000 (worth over £9 million in 2015).

== Cricket career ==
Peel's career was brief, of nine matches for Oxford University, Kent County Cricket Club and the Gentlemen of Kent in the 1851 and 1852 seasons. He played as a batsman, with a top score of 82. He played in minor matches for a variety of teams, including the pre-county Worcestershire and Oxfordshire clubs, the Gentlemen of Worcestershire and I Zingari.

== Family ==
On 6 September 1853 at Hartlebury in Worcestershire, Peel married Georgiana Maria Baker (1830–1907), only daughter of the Reverend Thomas Baker, rector of Hartlebury, and his wife Elizabeth, daughter of Bishop Robert James Carr. They had four children:

- Alice (1854–1942), who married Arthur Howard Heath, a keen cricketer and rugby international.
- Herbert (1856–1933), who married Muriel Hilda Miller.
- Amy (1859–1929), who married the Reverend James Henry Savory, another cricketer and FA Cup finalist footballer.
- Augusta (1862–1925), who married first William Wyckham Tyrwhitt-Drake and secondly Frederick Peter Game.

== Bibliography ==
- Carlaw, Derek (2020). Kent County Cricketers, A to Z: Part One (1806–1914) (PDF). Cardiff: ACS.
