= James Henry Savory =

English cricketer and clergyman

Personal information
- Born: 20 March 1855; Binfield, Berkshire, England
- Died: 5 August 1903 (aged 48); Bayham Abbey, Sussex, England
- Batting: Right-handed

Domestic team information
- Years: Team
- 1877-1878: Oxford University Cricket Club
- 1879-1883: Marylebone Cricket Club
- 1879-1879: A.W. Ridley's XI
- 1882-1882: Gentlemen of England
- First-class debut: 24 May 1877 Oxford University v Marylebone Cricket Club (MCC)
- Last First-class: 24 May 1883 Marylebone Cricket Club (MCC) v Oxford University

Career statistics
Competition	First-class
Matches	13
Runs scored	231
Batting average	10.04
100s/50s	0/0
Top score	36
Catches/stumpings	7/0
- Source: CricketArchive, 23 May 2016

Reverend James Henry Savory (1855–1903) was an English clergyman, a Double Blue at Oxford University, a first-class cricketer, and an FA Cup finalist in football.

== Life ==
Baptised at Binfield on 15 April 1855, only son of the Reverend Edmund Savory (1825–1912) and his wife Diana Maria Randall, he was educated at Winchester College and from 1874 at Trinity College, Oxford, gaining a MA in 1885. In 1886, he was appointed vicar of Little Dalby in Leicestershire. From 1896, he was chaplain of the chapel on the Bayham Abbey estate, being recorded there in the 1901 census. Probate of his will was granted to his widow on 31 August 1903.

== Cricket career ==
He played for his school, Winchester College, in 1873 and 1874, and then at university for his college, Trinity. Picked for the university team, he played in the Varsity Match against Cambridge in 1877 and 1878. Other first-class teams he played for were MCC, A.W. Ridley's XI, and Gentlemen of England. He also batted for Harlequins, Old Wykehamists, and finally Free Foresters, for whom he last turned out in 1893.

== Football career ==
At university, he qualified for the Oxford University team, who were runners-up in the 1876-77 FA Cup.

== Family ==
On 25 February 1886 at Thornton, Buckinghamshire, he married Amy (1859–1929), second daughter of the Reverend Herbert Richard Peel and his wife Georgiana Maria, daughter of the Reverend Thomas Baker. His wife's older sister, Alice, married Arthur Howard Heath. With Amy he had two daughters, Gladys Rebe Savory (1887–1947) and Ethel Mary Savory (1888–1958), who did not marry.
