= Bert Lisle =

British Trade Union Leader

Herbert Lisle OBE (19 October 1907 – 3 September 1991) was a British trade union leader.

Born in Oldham, Lisle attended Clarkesfield Council School, and then Waterloo Higher Standard Centre. He left when he was fourteen, and began an apprenticeship as a watchmaker, but left after six months and began working in a cotton mill, training as a weaver. He attended evening classes to try to move into management, but was unable to find a position.

Lisle joined the Oldham Weavers' Association, and served as a collector for the union. In 1934, he became a full-time organiser for the union, then in 1937 the union's Middleton District Officer. He was also elected to Middleton Town Council, representing the Labour Party.

In 1946, he was one of 40 applicants to become general secretary of the Amalgamated Society of Textile Workers and Kindred Trades (ASTWKT), a union based in Leek, Staffordshire, which primarily represented silk workers. He won the post, and in 1948 also became secretary of the trade union side of the Joint Industrial Council (JIC) for silk, and the narrow fabrics JIC. In 1949, he was elected to Leek Trades Council, serving until 1958.

In January 1951, Lisle convinced the union to affiliate to the Amalgamated Weavers' Association, and he was elected to its central committee. This affiliation was not successful, and the union withdrew in 1955. In 1965, Lisle negotiated for the National Silk Weavers' and Textile Traders' Association to merge into the union, taking its membership over 7,000, and, meaning that for the first time it had members outside Cheshire and Staffordshire.

In 1964, he was elected to Staffordshire County Council, serving until 1967. In the 1972 Birthday Honours, Lisle was made an Officer of the Order of the British Empire. He retired in 1983.

Trade union offices
Preceded by Tom Birch	General Secretary of the Amalgamated Society of Textile Workers and Kindred Trades; 1946–1983	Succeeded by Alfred Hitchmough
