= Amalgamated Society of Textile Workers and Kindred Trades =

Former trade union of the United Kingdom

ASTWKT
- Amalgamated Society of Textile Workers and Kindred Trades
- Merged into: Manufacturing, Science and Finance
- Founded: October 1919
- Dissolved: 2000
- Headquarters: Market Place, Leek, Staffordshire
- Location: United Kingdom
- Members: 2,059 (1946); 3,561 (1982)
- Key people: William Bromfield (Gen Sec)
- Publication: Textile Voice
- Affiliations: TUC, General Federation of Trade Unions, Labour

The Amalgamated Society of Textile Workers and Kindred Trades (ASTWKT) was a trade union representing textile workers, principally silk manufacturing, in the United Kingdom.

== Leek Textile Federation ==
By 1907, Leek had eight small trade unions representing textile workers, most of whom worked with silk. Six of the unions were led by William Bromfield, and the remaining two by William Stubbs. That year, the Leek Textile Federation, and all the unions other than the Silk Twisters' Society affiliated. Bromfield defeated Stubbs to become the federation's secretary.

The federation's affiliates were:

Union	Founded	Membership (1910)
Amalgamated Society of Braid Workers and Kindred Trades	1889	810
Amalgamated Society of Silk and Cotton Dyers	1897	520
Amalgamated Society of Silk Pickers	1884	202
Amalgamated Society of Silk Spinners, Throwsters and Reelers	1907	160
Amalgamated Society of Women Workers	1906	4,800
Association of Trimming Weavers' Society of Leek and District	1871	260
Leek Spun Silk Dressers Union	1907	?

The organisation later became known as the Midland Textile Federation, as some of the unions had members in other parts of Staffordshire and Cheshire. It affiliated to the Labour Party, and at the 1918 UK general election, it successfully sponsored Bromfield as a Parliamentary candidate:

Constituency	Candidate	Votes	Percentage	Position
Leek	William Bromfield	10,510	51.7	1

== History ==
In October 1919, the unions merged, forming the Amalgamated Society of Textile Workers and Kindred Trades. The Twisters still chose to remain separate, and eventually dissolved, in 1939.

By 1920, the union had 10,485 members. It focused on pay and conditions, and also on welfare benefits for members. It did not undertake any strikes, although it supported the UK General Strike, and organised backing for it in Leek. Membership fell in the 1930s, averaging 4,500 that decade, with the majority being women, and dropped further to only 2,059 in 1946.

In 1951, the union affiliated to the Amalgamated Weavers' Association, but this was not a success, and it left a few years later, in order to cut its expenses. In 1965, it absorbed with the National Silk Weavers' and Textile Traders' Association, meaning that for the first time it had members outside Cheshire and Staffordshire, although only in a limited number of locations: Dunfermline, Farnworth, Great Yarmouth and Pontypridd. This took membership up to 7,000.

Membership began falling again, and by 1982 was down to 3,561. In 1992, the union renamed itself as the Union of Textile Workers, and in 2000, it merged into the Manufacturing, Science and Finance union.

== Leadership ==
=== General Secretaries ===
1919: William Bromfield
1942: Tom Birch
1946: Bert Lisle
1983: Alfred Hitchmough

=== Presidents ===
1919: Albert Chattaway
1948: Harold Forrester
1963: Frank Stubbs
1965: John Watson
1980s: Harry Braley
1990s: Sean Hulme
