= Stafford and Stone =

Parliamentary constituency in the United Kingdom, 1950–1983

- Former county constituency for the House of Commons
- County: Staffordshire
- Major settlements: Stafford, Stone

1950–1983
- Seats: One
- Created from: Stafford, Stone and Burton
- Replaced by: Stafford and Mid Staffordshire

Stafford and Stone was county constituency in Staffordshire which returned one Member of Parliament (MP) to the House of Commons of the Parliament of the United Kingdom.

It was created in 1950 and abolished in 1983.

== Boundaries ==
The Borough of Stafford, the Urban District of Stone, and the Rural Districts of Stafford and Stone.

== Members of Parliament ==
Election	Member	Party
1950	Sir Hugh Fraser	Conservative
1983	constituency abolished	

== Elections ==
=== Elections in the 1950s ===
General election 1950: Stafford and Stone
Party	Candidate	Votes	%	±%
Conservative	Hugh Fraser	24,046	52.65	
Labour	Stephen Swingler	19,008	41.62	
Liberal	William Joseph McEldowney	2,617	5.73	
Majority		5,038	11.03	
Turnout		45.671	85.98	
Conservative win (new seat)				

General election 1951: Stafford and Stone
Party	Candidate	Votes	%	±%
Conservative	Hugh Fraser	25,795	56.64	
Labour	Ghriam Passmore Grant	19,749	43.36	
Majority		6,046	13.28	
Turnout		45,544	84.15	
Conservative hold		Swing		

General election 1955: Stafford and Stone
Party	Candidate	Votes	%	±%
Conservative	Hugh Fraser	26,206	59.89	
Labour	Kenneth E Richardson	17,550	40.11	
Majority		8,656	19.78	
Turnout		43,756	78.99	
Conservative hold		Swing		

General election 1959: Stafford and Stone
Party	Candidate	Votes	%	±%
Conservative	Hugh Fraser	28,107	60.92	
Labour	Arnold Gregory	18,034	39.08	
Majority		10,073	21.84	
Turnout		46,141	80.84	
Conservative hold		Swing		

=== Elections in the 1960s ===
General election 1964: Stafford and Stone
Party	Candidate	Votes	%	±%
Conservative	Hugh Fraser	25,373	50.19	
Labour	Arthur Lewis Ballham	18,587	36.77	
Liberal	Brian D King	6,593	13.04	New
Majority		6,786	13.42	
Turnout		50,553	80.99	
Conservative hold		Swing		

General election 1966: Stafford and Stone
Party	Candidate	Votes	%	±%
Conservative	Hugh Fraser	25,259	49.43	
Labour	Graham S Rea	20,218	39.57	
Liberal	Eric Furniss	5,623	11.00	
Majority		5,041	9.86	
Turnout		51,100	79.45	
Conservative hold		Swing		

=== Elections in the 1970s ===
General election 1970: Stafford and Stone
Party	Candidate	Votes	%	±%
Conservative	Hugh Fraser	30,056	54.84	
Labour	Michael John Kenneth Stanworth	20,380	37.19	
Liberal	Arnold Williams	4,370	7.97	
Majority		9,676	17.65	
Turnout		54,806	73.37	
Conservative hold		Swing		

General election February 1974: Stafford and Stone
Party	Candidate	Votes	%	±%
Conservative	Hugh Fraser	30,056	46.77	
Labour	TE Cowlinshaw	21,073	32.79	
Liberal	HS Martin	13,132	20.44	
Majority		8,983	13.98	
Turnout		64,261	82.29	
Conservative hold		Swing		

General election October 1974: Stafford and Stone
Party	Candidate	Votes	%	±%
Conservative	Hugh Fraser	27,173	45.39	
Labour	TE Cowlinshaw	20,845	34.82	
Liberal	HS Martin	11,491	19.20	
Go To Blazes Party	David Sutch	351	0.59	New
Majority		6,328	10.57	
Turnout		59,860	75.95	
Conservative hold		Swing		

General election 1979: Stafford and Stone
Party	Candidate	Votes	%	±%
Conservative	Hugh Fraser	34,387	52.38	
Labour	Michael JD Poulter	21,210	32.31	
Liberal	R Burman	10,049	15.31	
Majority		13,177	20.07	
Turnout		65,646	78.81	
Conservative hold		Swing		
