= Hugh Fraser (British politician) =

British politician (1918–1984)

Major The Right Honourable Sir Hugh Fraser MBE MP

Secretary of State for Air
- In office 16 July 1962 – 1 April 1964
- Prime Minister: Harold Macmillan; Alec Douglas-Home
- Preceded by: Julian Amery
- Succeeded by: Office abolished

Parliamentary Under-Secretary of State for the Colonies
- In office 28 October 1960 – 16 July 1962
- Prime Minister: Harold Macmillan
- Preceded by: Julian Amery
- Succeeded by: Nigel Fisher

Parliamentary Under-Secretary of State and Financial Secretary for War
- In office 28 November 1958 – 28 October 1960
- Prime Minister: Harold Macmillan
- Preceded by: Julian Amery
- Succeeded by: James Ramsden

Member of Parliament for Stafford Stafford and Stone (1950–1983) Stone (1945–1950)
- In office 5 July 1945 – 6 March 1984
- Preceded by: Joseph Lamb
- Succeeded by: Bill Cash

Personal details
- Born: Hugh Charles Patrick Joseph Fraser; 23 January 1918 Westminster, London, England
- Died: 6 March 1984 (aged 66) Lambeth, London, England
- Party: Conservative
- Spouse: Lady Antonia Pakenham (m. 1956; div. 1977)
- Children: 6, including Rebecca, Orlando, and Flora
- Parent(s): Simon Fraser, 14th Lord Lovat; Hon. Laura Lister
- Education: Balliol College, Oxford
- Occupation: Politician

Sir Hugh Charles Patrick Joseph Fraser MBE (23 January 1918 – 6 March 1984) was a British Conservative Party politician and first husband of Lady Antonia Fraser.

== Youth and military career ==
Fraser was the second son of the 14th Lord Lovat and a prominent Roman Catholic. He was educated at Ampleforth College and Balliol College, Oxford, where he was President of the Oxford Union. He also attended the Sorbonne.

He was commissioned into the Lovat Scouts in 1936 and served throughout World War II. During the war, Fraser served in GHQ Liaison Regiment. Lieutenant Fraser was promoted to temporary captain on 14 April 1942 and became second in command of ‘C’ Squadron. In November 1944, he was posted to IS9 as an intelligence officer.

Fraser was appointed a Member of the Order of the British Empire:

"In February, March and April of this year, he was responsible for planning and organising infiltration and evacuation operations in Southern Holland. Throughout, his work with IS 9 (WEA) has been outstanding, and his powers of leadership and sympathetic handling of agents have largely contributed to the success the operational teams have had during the past months."

Fraser was awarded the 1940 Belgian Croix de Guerre with palm:

"Capt Fraser was dropped by parachute near Somme-Leuze in the Ardennes on 1 Sept 1944 to act as Liaison Officer between HQ SAS Troops and the Commander of Zone the Belgian Armee Secrete, in whose zone SAS parties of the Belgian SAS Regt were then operating. The Armee Secrete in the Ardennes was very short of arms and it was largely as a result of Capt Fraser's efforts that some 2000 arms were dropped to them in the next three weeks. He also organised the supply of local guides and of intelligence to the advancing US forces. From October 1944 until March 1945 Capt Fraser was in charge of an I.S. 9 Field Section in the Canadian Army sector in Holland where he did valuable work in arranging the exfiltration of allied evaders collected by Lt Kirschen (Belgian SAS Regt operation Fabian) in the Velune district."

== Political career ==
Fraser was elected Member of Parliament for Stone in 1945, later Stafford and Stone following constituency boundary changes, from 1950 until 1983 and then Stafford again until his death. He served as an MP continuously from 1945 until 1984 but did not become Father of the House as he was sworn in as an MP on 15 August 1945 while James Callaghan had been sworn in on 2 August 1945 and so he, rather than Fraser, became Father following the 1983 election. Fraser was the founder of the Conservative Philosophy Group, a group created to provide an intellectual basis for conservatism.

He was parliamentary private secretary to Oliver Lyttelton (1951–54), a junior minister in the War Office (1958–60) and Colonial Office (1960–62), and Secretary of State for Air (1962–64). He was sworn in as a Member of the Privy Council in 1962, giving him the right to the prefix "The Right Honourable" for life. He stood as a candidate in the Conservative Party's 1975 leadership election, presenting himself as an anti-establishment candidate, criticizing incumbent leader Edward Heath for his "domination" of the party, and advocating for rebuilding support for the Conservative Party in Scotland and Northern Ireland. He gained 16 votes in the first round challenging Edward Heath, with the leadership eventually being won by Margaret Thatcher.

== Personal life ==
Fraser married the future author Lady Antonia Pakenham, daughter of the Earl and Countess of Longford, on 25 September 1956. They had six children, including Flora. In 1975, while she was still married to him, Lady Antonia Fraser met and started living with playwright Harold Pinter, who was also married at the time. The Frasers divorced in 1977; Lady Antonia married Pinter in 1980 when his divorce became final. Hugh was knighted in the 1980 Birthday Honours.

Fraser was the intended target of an IRA car bomb on 23 October 1975. The bomb had been fitted to one of Fraser's cars outside his home in Campden Hill Square. A noted cancer researcher, Professor Gordon Hamilton Fairley, was walking past the car when the bomb exploded prematurely, killing him instantly. Fraser's wife, Lady Antonia, and Caroline Kennedy, a guest of the Frasers visiting London to complete a year-long art course at Sotheby's auction house, would have been in the car when the bomb detonated had it not done so prematurely. The reason that Fraser was targeted for assassination remains unknown.

Fraser was remembered by John Casey as being a "high Tory ... and Romantic" with a "gift for friendship".

== Death ==
Sir Hugh Fraser remained in parliament until his death from lung cancer in March 1984, aged 66. Bill Cash retained the seat for the Tories at the by-election two months later.

== Sources ==
- Hansard 1803–2005: contributions in Parliament by Sir Hugh Fraser
- The Times House of Commons 1945. 1945.
- The Times House of Commons 1950. 1950.
- The Times House of Commons 1955. 1955.
- GHQ Liaison Regiment Phantom A Nominal Roll with Short Biographies by Asher Pirt 2011. 2011.

Parliament of the United Kingdom
Preceded by Sir Joseph Lamb	Member of Parliament for Stone; 1945 – 1950	Constituency abolished
New constituency	Member of Parliament for Stafford and Stone; 1950 – 1983	Constituency abolished
New constituency	Member of Parliament for Stafford; 1983 – 1984	Succeeded by Bill Cash
Political offices
Preceded by Julian Amery	Under-Secretary of State for the Colonies; 1960 – 1962	Succeeded by Nigel Fisher
