= Charlotte Atkins =

British Labour Party politician

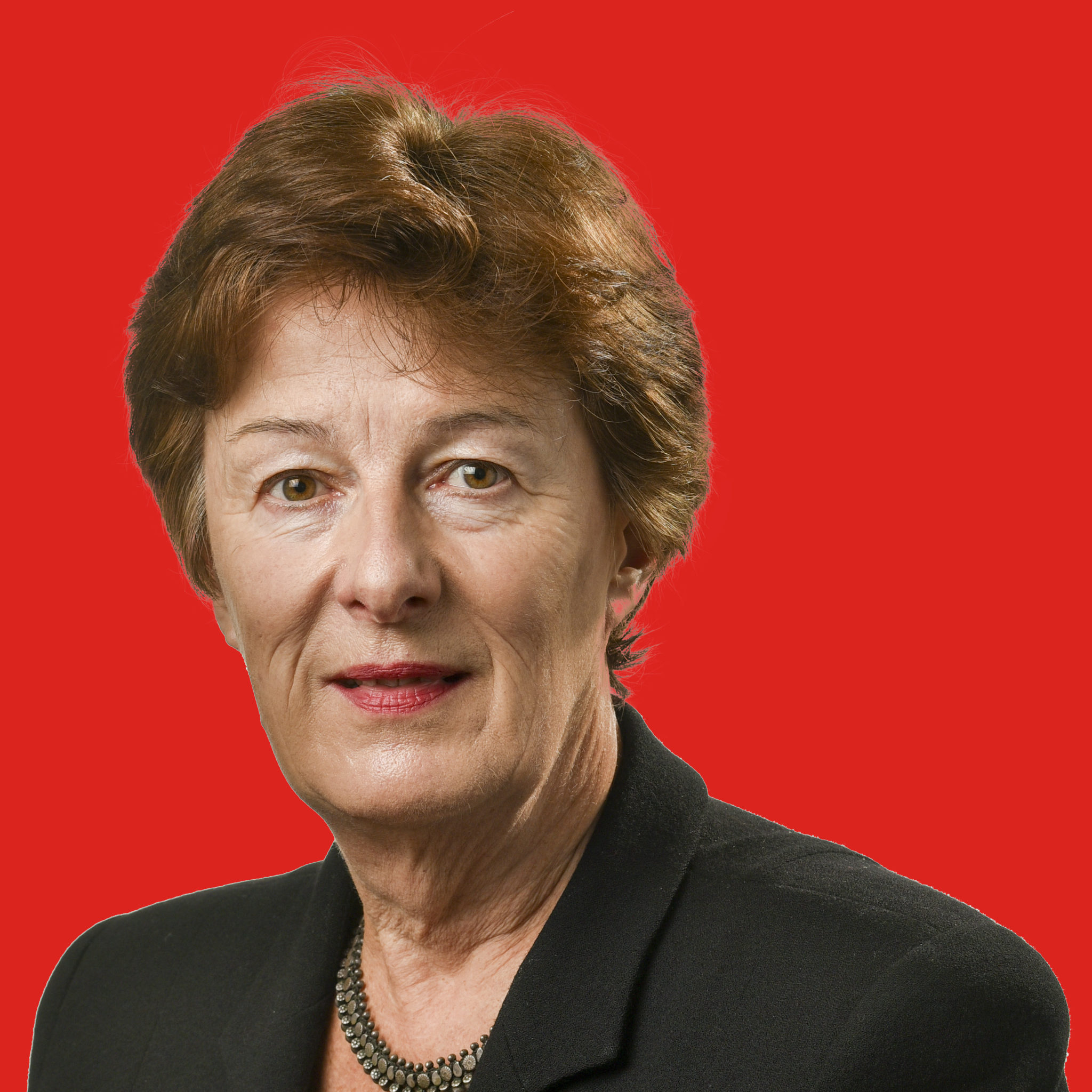
- Atkins in 2020

Parliamentary Under-Secretary of State for Transport
- In office 10 September 2004 – 10 May 2005
- Prime Minister: Tony Blair
- Sec. of State: Alistair Darling
- Preceded by: Tony McNulty
- Succeeded by: Karen Buck

Member of Parliament for Staffordshire Moorlands
- In office 1 May 1997 – 12 April 2010
- Preceded by: David Knox
- Succeeded by: Karen Bradley

Personal details
- Born: 24 September 1950 (age 75) Chelmsford, Essex, England
- Party: Labour
- Spouse: Gus Brain
- Children: 1
- Parent: Ronald Atkins (father)
- Education: London School of Economics

Charlotte Jean Scott Atkins (born 24 September 1950) is a British Labour Party politician who was the Member of Parliament (MP) for Staffordshire Moorlands from 1997 until 2010.

== Early life ==
Atkins is the daughter of Ron Atkins, the left wing former Labour MP for Preston North, and the second-longest lived British MP ever. Atkins was educated at the Colchester County High School, and is a graduate of the London School of Economics, gaining a BSc in Economics. From the University of London, she also gained an MA in Area Studies. She worked as a community relations officer with the Luton Community Research Council from 1974 to 1976, before joining the trade union movement.

For four years she was a researcher with the UCATT union (from 1976 to 1980), then a researcher from 1980 to 1984 for the TASS and AUEW, before becoming a press officer for UNISON and COHSE from 1984 to 1987.

Atkins joined the Labour Party in 1965. In 1982, she was elected as a councillor in the London Borough of Wandsworth, and was the Deputy Leader of the Labour Group from 1983 to 1986. In 1981 she wrote a book with Chris Mullin entitled How to Select or Reselect Your MP.

== Parliamentary career ==
In 1990, Atkins unsuccessfully contested the Eastbourne by-election caused by the assassination of the Conservative MP Ian Gow by the Provisional IRA. She entered the House of Commons at the 1997 general election in the Labour landslide as the Member of Parliament for Staffordshire Moorlands, a seat held previously by the retiring David Knox and which had been Conservative-held for 27 years.

After the 2001 general election, Atkins was appointed a Parliamentary Private Secretary to the Foreign and Commonwealth Office. She was promoted to Parliamentary Under Secretary of State at the Department for Transport in 2004, but was dropped after the 2005 general election. In July 2005 she became a member of the Health Select Committee.

Atkins was largely loyal to the Labour government during her time in Parliament and rarely rebelled.

Atkins was vice-chair of the All-Party Hill Farmers Group, and took part in a series of adjournment debates on government funding for inland waterways. She is a volunteer for the Manchester-based British Fluoridisation Society.

Atkins lost her seat at the 2010 general election to Karen Bradley of the Conservative Party.

== Post-parliamentary career ==
In March 2012, Atkins was appointed as the chair of the Central Shires Canal and River Trust Partnership Board. The CRT is the charity which has taken over the work and role of British Waterways. She was heavily involved in campaigning for more funds and the regeneration of England's waterways while in Parliament, and won the first ever Inland Waterways Association Parliamentarian of the Year Award in 2008.

Atkins was elected as a councillor for the Leek North ward of Staffordshire County Council in a 2012 by-election, and continued to represent the ward until her defeat in 2025.

== Personal life ==
She married Gus Brain in June 1990 in Bromley and has one child, Emma, born in October 1986.

Her twin sister, Liz, is a Lambeth Councillor.

== Publications ==
- How to Select or Reselect Your Member of Parliament by Chris Mullin and Charlotte Atkins, 1981, Institute of Workers' Control ISBN 0-901740-74-8

Parliament of the United Kingdom
Preceded by David Knox	Member of Parliament for Staffordshire Moorlands; 1997–2010	Succeeded by Karen Bradley
