= Joseph Lamb (politician) =

British politician (1873–1949)

Sir Joseph Quinton Lamb (2 May 1873 – 20 November 1949) was a Conservative Party politician in the United Kingdom. He was elected at the 1922 general election as member of parliament (MP) for Stone in Staffordshire, and held the seat until he stood down at the 1945 general election.

He was knighted on 12 July 1929.

== Sources ==
- Craig, F. W. S. (1983) [1969]. British parliamentary election results 1918-1949 (3rd ed.). Chichester: Parliamentary Research Services. ISBN 0-900178-06-X.
- Leigh Rayment's Historical List of MPs – Constituencies beginning with "S" (part 5)

Parliament of the United Kingdom
Preceded by Sir Smith Child, Bt.	Member of Parliament for Stone; 1922–1945	Succeeded by Hugh Fraser
