= Arthur Ratcliffe =

British politician (1882–1963)

Arthur Ratcliffe (17 February 1882 – 3 May 1963) was a British Conservative Party politician who served as the Member of Parliament (MP) for the Leek division of Staffordshire from 1931 to 1935.

Ratcliffe stood for Parliament only once, at the 1931 general election, when he overturned the comfortable majority of Leek's sitting Labour Party, William Bromfield, winning the seat with a majority of 2.8%. Ratcliffe did not defend the seat at the next election, in 1935, when Bromfield was returned in a two-person contest with a National Labour Party candidate. It was suggested that he should stand in the 1939 General Election, but that did not happen.

He owned a building firm and built a house for himself on a hill at Ecton in Staffordshire, about 12 miles from the town of Leek. It became known as "Ratcliffe's Folly", or "The Castle" because of its copper spire and battlements. Construction started in 1922 and continued until 1939 with various alterations and additions. The spire was constructed in 1937 and completed with an 8-inch golden ball on the top.

Parliament of the United Kingdom
Preceded by William Bromfield	Member of Parliament for Leek; 1931 – 1935	Succeeded by William Bromfield
