= Charles Bill =

British politician

Bill in 1895.

Charles Bill (8 January 1843 – 9 December 1915) was a British Conservative Party politician who served as the Member of Parliament (MP) for the Leek division of Staffordshire from 1892 to 1906.

== Early life and family ==
Bill was the only son of John and Sarah Bill of Farley Hall, Staffordshire. He was educated at Eton and at University College, Oxford, where he graduated in law and history.

== Military career ==
He was commissioned into the part-time King's Own (3rd Staffordshire) Rifle Militia on 6 April 1863 and served on the staff of the Burma Expedition of 1886. He became commanding officer of the battalion (by then part of the North Staffordshire Regiment) with the rank of Lieutenant-Colonel on 29 May 1893. After retiring from the command he was appointed Honorary Colonel of the battalion on 3 December 1898.

== Political career ==
Bill was an alderman on Staffordshire County Council, and at the 1892 general election he was elected as MP for Leek, following the retirement of the Conservative MP Harry Davenport. He was re-elected in 1895 and 1900, and held his seat in the House of Commons until his defeat at the 1906 general election by the Liberal Party candidate Robert Pearce.

== Business career ==
Bill was involved with multiple railway companies. He was the Chairman of the Leek and Manifold Valley Light Railway, a Director of the North Staffordshire Railway and a Director of the Parral (Mexico) Railway and Mining Company.

Parliament of the United Kingdom
Preceded by Harry Davenport	Member of Parliament for Leek; 1892 – 1906	Succeeded by Robert Pearce
