= Robert Pearce (politician) =

British Liberal Party politician (1840-1922)

Robert Pearce

Sir Robert Pearce (15 January 1840 – 29 September 1922) was a British Liberal Party politician. He was a Member of Parliament (MP) for all but one of the years from 1906 to 1918, and was an early advocate in Parliament of daylight saving time.

== Early life and family ==
Pearce was born in Ipswich in Suffolk to Joseph Pearce and his wife Frances Margaret née Hayward, and was educated at Ipswich Grammar School. He qualified as a solicitor and became a partner in the firm of Pearce, Bradshaw and Capper, of Fore Street in London.

Pearce married twice, first in 1880 to Elizabeth Deane, who died in 1910, and then in 1914 to Margaret W. Exton. He lived in Hampstead and was a member of the National Liberal Club and the City Reform Club.

== Political career ==
At the 1906 general election Pearce was elected for the MP for the Leek division of Staffordshire, having contested the seat unsuccessfully in 1895 and 1900. He introduced the Daylight Saving Bill to the House of Commons on 12 February 1908.

Pearce was defeated at the January 1910 election, losing by only 10 votes (out of over 10,000) to the Conservative candidate Arthur Heath. Heath did not stand again in December 1910, when Pearce retook the seat, holding it until he retired from Parliament at the next election in December 1918, aged 78.

Pearce was knighted in 1916.

Parliament of the United Kingdom
Preceded by Charles Bill	Member of Parliament for Leek; 1906 – January 1910	Succeeded by Arthur Heath
Preceded by Arthur Heath	Member of Parliament for Leek; December 1910 – 1918	Succeeded by William Bromfield
