= Charles Crompton =

English barrister and Liberal politician

- Born: 4 February 1833; St Pancras, London
- Died: 25 June 1890 (aged 57)
- Occupations: barrister, politician
- Spouse: Florence Elizabeth Gaskell (m. 1863)
- Parent(s): Charles John Crompton; Caroline Fletcher

Charles Crompton Q.C. (4 February 1833 – 25 June 1890) was an English barrister and Liberal politician.

== Life ==
Crompton was born at St Pancras, London, the son of Sir Charles Crompton, a Judge of the Queen's Bench and his wife Caroline Fletcher of Liverpool. He was educated at University College School, University College London, and at Trinity College, Cambridge (4th Wrangler 1855, MA 1858). He was a Fellow of the college in 1856 and was called to the bar at Inner Temple in 1864. Crompton stood unsuccessfully for parliament at West Cheshire in the 1874 general election. He was a member of the commission to investigate alleged corrupt practices at Knaresborough in 1880. and became a Q.C. in 1882.

At the 1885 general election, Crompton was elected Member of Parliament (MP) for Leek in Staffordshire. He lost the seat at the 1886 general election, and did not stand again.

Crompton lived at Manchester and died at the age of 57.

Crompton married Florence Elizabeth Gaskell, daughter of Elizabeth Gaskell, in 1863.

Parliament of the United Kingdom
New constituency see North Staffordshire	Member of Parliament for Leek; 1885 – 1886	Succeeded by Harry Davenport
