= Arthur Heath =

British cricketer and politician

Personal information
- Full name: Arthur Howard Heath
- Born: 29 May 1856; Titterton, Newcastle-under-Lyme, Staffordshire, England
- Died: 24 April 1930 (aged 73); Marylebone, London, England
- Batting: Right-handed
- Bowling: Right-arm fast

Domestic team information
- Years: Team
- 1875: Gloucestershire
- 1876–1879: Oxford University
- 1876–1894: MCC
- 1878: Middlesex

Career statistics
| Competition | First-class |
|---|---|
| Matches | 44 |
| Runs scored | 969 |
| Batting average | 13.27 |
| 100s/50s | 0/4 |
| Top score | 71 |
| Balls bowled | 659 |
| Wickets | 26 |
| Bowling average | 14.65 |
| 5 wickets in innings | 1 |
| 10 wickets in match | 0 |
| Best bowling | 6/11 |
| Catches/stumpings | 26/- |
- Source: CricketArchive, 10 July 2010

Arthur Howard Heath TD (29 May 1856 – 24 April 1930) was a British industrialist, first-class cricketer, Rugby union international and Conservative Party politician.

== Background and education ==
Born at Newcastle-under-Lyme in Staffordshire on 29 May 1856, he was the younger son of Robert Heath (died 1893), owner of coal mines and iron works, His elder brother was Sir James Heath, 1st Baronet. He was educated at Clifton College and Brasenose College, Oxford, where he graduated MA.

== Rugby and cricket ==
He was well known as a rugby player in the 1870s, representing Oxford University RFC against Cambridge in 1875, 1877, 1879, and 1880, and appearing for England against Scotland in 1876.

The family was also very involved in cricket and his main sporting fame was as a cricket player and administrator. On the field he was a free-hitting batsman, strong on the off-side, fielded well at long-leg or cover-point, and bowled fast round-arm. Starting at school, in away matches he made 120 not out for Clifton against Sherborne in 1874 and a faultless 164 against Cheltenham in 1875.He also played for Gloucestershire, making his debut in 1875, just after leaving school. Going up to Oxford, he played in the University XI for four seasons from 1876 to 1889, with a best score of 71 against Middlesex.

He was a double Blue and competed in the Varsity Match in rugby and in the University Match at cricket .

In 1877 he played for Marylebone Cricket Club (MCC) against Surrey at Lord's and in 1878 for Middlesex, appearing against Yorkshire at Bramall Lane and against Nottinghamshire at Trent Bridge. He was a member of MCC.

Three brothers-in-law, his brother, his father-in-law and his son all played club and county cricket. Heath himself made 44 appearances at first-class level in all, scoring 969 runs and taking 26 wickets.

From 1879 on, his loyalty was to his native Staffordshire. He played for the county until 1898, being captain from 1884 to 1893 and leading the county team in its first ever Minor Counties Championship match. In addition, he served as honorary secretary from 1886 to 1888, and for many years as honorary treasurer. His highest scores for the county were 217 against Lincolnshire at Stoke-on-Trent in 1889, made in four hours, and 155 not out against Cheshire in 1882.

== Military career ==
He was commissioned as a second lieutenant in the Staffordshire Yeomanry on 18 August 1880. He was promoted lieutenant on an unknown date, and captain on 16 October 1886. He was promoted honorary major on 9 September 1896, honorary lieutenant-colonel on 12 July 1905, substantive lt-col, and commanding officer, on 7 April 1906, and honorary colonel on 31 May 1906. He was awarded the Territorial Decoration on 2 April 1909. He retired on 6 April 1910. In the First World War he was lt-col with the 48th Midlands (Howitzer) Brigade, Royal Field Artillery, until 1915.

== Business career ==
He was involved in founding the Staffordshire Post in 1892, but this did not last long, with its parent company, The Staffordshire Potteries Newspaper Company, Ltd, wound up in 1896. The title was bought out by the Staffordshire Sentinel and Heath subsequently served as a director of that company, and later chairman, until the title was sold in 1928.

Heath had joined the family business after graduation. On the death of his father in 1893, Heath and his two brothers formed the company of Robert Heath and Sons, Ltd to run the family's coal and iron interests. This was sold to the Low Moor Iron Company in 1910. The brothers had also founded the Birchenwood Colliery Company at Newchapel near Kidsgrove in 1893, developing a coking and coal byproducts business. This was the largest industrial site that the Newchapel area has ever known and provided employment for several thousand people in its heyday. According to his obituary in The Times Birchenwood did well during the First World War when its chemical products were in demand for explosives, but in the depression that followed, the company began to struggle, but the brothers kept it going to provide employment to the people of Kidsgrove, though it returned no profit to them.

== Political career ==
Heath was elected as the 1900 general election as the Member of Parliament (MP) for the borough of Hanley in Staffordshire, having fought the seat unsuccessfully in 1892 and 1895.

After losing his seat at the 1906 general election, he was returned to the House of Commons at the January 1910 general election for the Leek division of Staffordshire, with a majority of only 10 votes. He did not stand again at the December 1910 general election. His father and his brother, Sir James Heath were also Members of Parliament.

He also became J.P. for Staffordshire in 1894

== Death ==
He died aged 73 on 24 April 1930, in Marylebone, London. In legal notices relating to his estate he was described as "Arthur Howard Heath, late of Keele Hall, in the county of Stafford, and of No. 46, Orchard-court, Portman-square".

== Family ==
On 10 January 1884 at Thornton, Buckinghamshire, he married Alice (1854–1942), eldest daughter of the Reverend Herbert Richard Peel (1831–1885), a nephew of the prime minister Sir Robert Peel, 2nd Baronet, and his wife Georgiana Maria (1830–1907), daughter of the Reverend Thomas Baker. Alice's sister Amy married the Reverend James Henry Savory, a cricketer for Oxford and MCC and an FA Cup finalist in football.

With Alice, he had two children:

- Georgina Beatrice Heath (1885–1969), unmarried.
- Robert Arthur Heath (1887–1943), who married a daughter of Rudolph Feilding, 9th Earl of Denbigh and had two children.

Parliament of the United Kingdom
| Preceded by William Woodall | Member of Parliament for Hanley; 1900 – 1906 | Succeeded by Enoch Edwards |
| Preceded by Robert Pearce | Member of Parliament for Leek; January 1910 – December 1910 | Succeeded by Robert Pearce |
