= David Knox (politician) =

British politician (1933–2025)

Sir David Knox

Member of Parliament for Staffordshire Moorlands Leek (1970–1983)
- In office 18 June 1970 – 8 April 1997
- Preceded by: Harold Davies
- Succeeded by: Charlotte Atkins

Personal details
- Born: 30 May 1933 Lockerbie, Dumfriesshire, Scotland
- Died: 14 September 2025 (aged 92)
- Party: Conservative

Sir David Laidlaw Knox (30 May 1933 – 14 September 2025) was a British Conservative Party politician and Member of Parliament from 1970 to 1997.

== Early life ==
Knox was born in Lockerbie, Dumfriesshire, Scotland on 30 May 1933, the son of a printer and publisher. He was educated at Lockerbie Academy and Dumfries Academy, afterwards studying for an external BSc(Econ.) at the University of London. He was a management trainee at Waterston's stationers and printers in Edinburgh from 1953 to 1956 before becoming a printing executive in Worcester and, later on, an organisation and methods consultant for Lucas Industries in Birmingham. Having moved south, he chaired the West Midlands Young Conservatives in 1963–64, and the region’s Conservative Political Centre from 1966 to 1969.

== Parliamentary career ==
Knox first sought election for Birmingham Stechford at the 1964 and 1966 elections, but was beaten by the Labour Cabinet Minister Roy Jenkins on each occasion. In 1967, he was the Conservative candidate in a by-election at Nuneaton caused by the resignation of Frank Cousins, but was defeated by Labour candidate Les Huckfield.

He was elected Conservative MP for Leek, Staffordshire from 1970 to 1983, and for Staffordshire Moorlands from 1983 to 1997, when he retired.

Knox, once in Parliament, joined what was to become the Macleod Group led by Nicholas Scott that was considered to be for Conservative MPs that were pro-European and progressive on social issues and he was noted as strongly supporting Britain's entry to the EEC. Knox protested against a decision to allow the Palestine Liberation Organization to open an office in London. He supported the abolition of capital punishment. In 1973, Knox was appointed Parliamentary Private Secretary to Ian Gilmour, then Minister of State for Defence.

Knox was appointed one of three vice-chairmen of the Conservative Party under the chairman Willie Whitelaw in 1974. He also became President of the Macleod Group, and in that position issued a statement in January 1975 supporting Edward Heath as Conservative leader for the leadership election in February. His open support for Heath probably led to his dismissal as vice-chairman in March by new leader Margaret Thatcher. In September 1975, after the Macleod Group merged with two other 'left-wing' Conservative groups in June to form the Tory Reform Group, Knox became its vice-president with Nicholas Scott. Knox also became chairman of the Parliamentary Group for World Government. In December, he voted against the return of capital punishment, unlike his new leader, who voted for its return.

On the issue of Scottish devolution, Knox clashed with the Conservative Shadow Cabinet. Knox argued that "meaningful devolution of political power for Scotland" was necessary now to avoid Scots feeling the need to vote for separatist parties. By this, he meant that the body needed to have legislative powers. This ran counter to Francis Pym, who was his party's spokesman for devolution at the time, whose policy was to form a constitutional body that had neither legislative or executive powers. In February 1978, he broke from the Conservative ranks and voted with the Labour Government and for the Scotland Bill.

== Death ==
Knox died on 14 September 2025, at the age of 92.

== Honours ==
Knox was knighted in the 1993 Birthday Honours.

== Sources ==
- "Times Guide to the House of Commons", Times Newspapers Limited, 1992

Parliament of the United Kingdom
Preceded by Harold Davies	Member of Parliament for Leek; 1970–1983	Constituency abolished
New constituency	Member of Parliament for Staffordshire Moorlands; 1983–1997	Succeeded by Charlotte Atkins
