= Karen Bradley =

British politician (born 1970)

The Right Honourable Dame Karen Bradley DBE MP
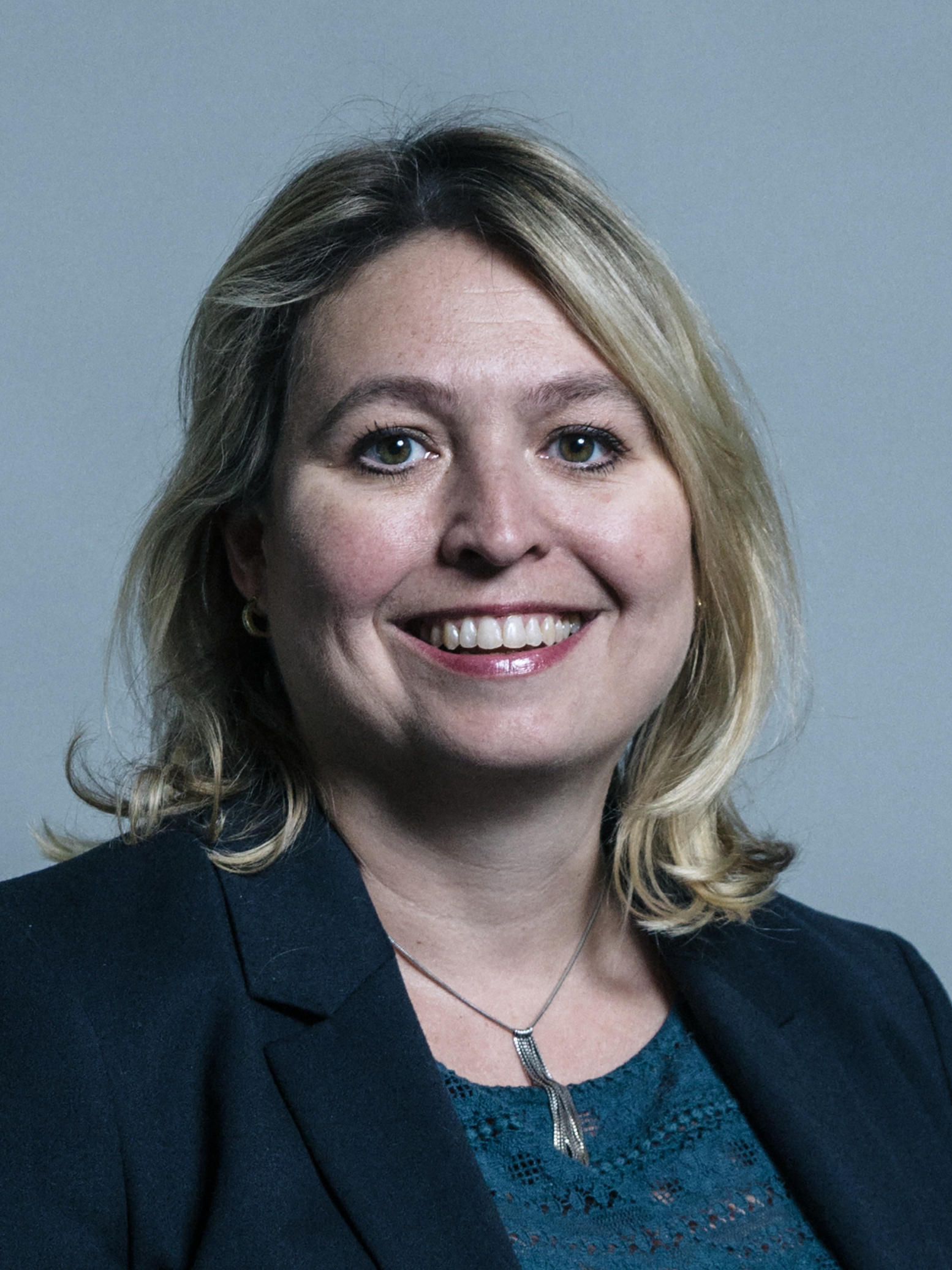
- Official portrait, 2017

Chair of the Home Affairs Select Committee
- Incumbent
- Assumed office 11 September 2024
- Preceded by: Dame Diana Johnson

Chair of the House of Commons Procedure Committee
- In office 29 January 2020 – 4 July 2024
- Preceded by: Charles Walker
- Succeeded by: Cat Smith

Secretary of State for Northern Ireland
- In office 8 January 2018 – 24 July 2019
- Prime Minister: Theresa May
- Preceded by: James Brokenshire
- Succeeded by: Julian Smith

Secretary of State for Digital, Culture, Media and Sport (Note: Culture, Media and Sport (2016–2017))
- In office 14 July 2016 – 8 January 2018
- Prime Minister: Theresa May
- Preceded by: John Whittingdale
- Succeeded by: Matt Hancock
Junior ministerial offices
Parliamentary Under-Secretary of State for Preventing Abuse, Exploitation and Crime
In office 8 February 2014 – 14 July 2016
Prime Minister	David Cameron
Preceded by	Office established
Succeeded by	Sarah Newton
Lord Commissioner of the Treasury
In office 7 October 2013 – 8 February 2014
Prime Minister	David Cameron
Preceded by	Robert Goodwill
Succeeded by	John Penrose

Member of Parliament for Staffordshire Moorlands
- Incumbent
- Assumed office 6 May 2010
- Preceded by: Charlotte Atkins
- Majority: 1,175 (2.8%)

Personal details
- Born: Karen Anne Howarth; 12 March 1970 (age 56) Newcastle-under-Lyme, England
- Party: Conservative
- Spouse: Neil Bradley
- Children: 2
- Education: Imperial College London
- Website: www.karenbradley.co.uk

Dame Karen Anne Bradley DBE (née Howarth; born 12 March 1970) is a British Conservative Party politician who has been the Member of Parliament (MP) for Staffordshire Moorlands since 2010 and the Chair of the Home Affairs Select Committee since 2024. She served as Secretary of State for Northern Ireland from 2018 to 2019.

Bradley was appointed to the Cameron–Clegg coalition as a Lord Commissioner of the Treasury in 2013, before being promoted to Parliamentary Under-Secretary of State for Preventing Abuse, Exploitation and Crime in 2014. During the formation of the May government in July 2016, she was appointed to the Cabinet as Secretary of State for Culture, Media and Sport, where she remained until being appointed Northern Ireland Secretary in January 2018, serving until her dismissal by new Prime Minister Boris Johnson in 2019.

== Early life and career ==
Karen Howarth was born on 12 March 1970 in Newcastle-under-Lyme. Her family moved to Buxton, where she was educated at the local comprehensive, before studying at Imperial College London, graduating with a BSc in mathematics.

In 1991, Bradley joined Deloitte & Touche and became a tax manager, and after seven years she became a senior tax manager with KPMG. In 2004 she set up business as a fiscal and economic consultant before rejoining KPMG in 2007, where she remained until her election to the House of Commons.

== Parliamentary career ==
At the 2005 general election, Bradley stood as the Conservative candidate in Manchester Withington, coming third with 10.5% of the vote behind the Liberal Democrat candidate John Leech and the Labour candidate Keith Bradley.

Bradley was a member of the Conservative Party's A-List and was selected as the prospective parliamentary candidate for Staffordshire Moorlands in July 2006. She was elected to Parliament at the 2010 general election as MP for Staffordshire Moorlands with 45.2% of the vote and a majority of 6,689.

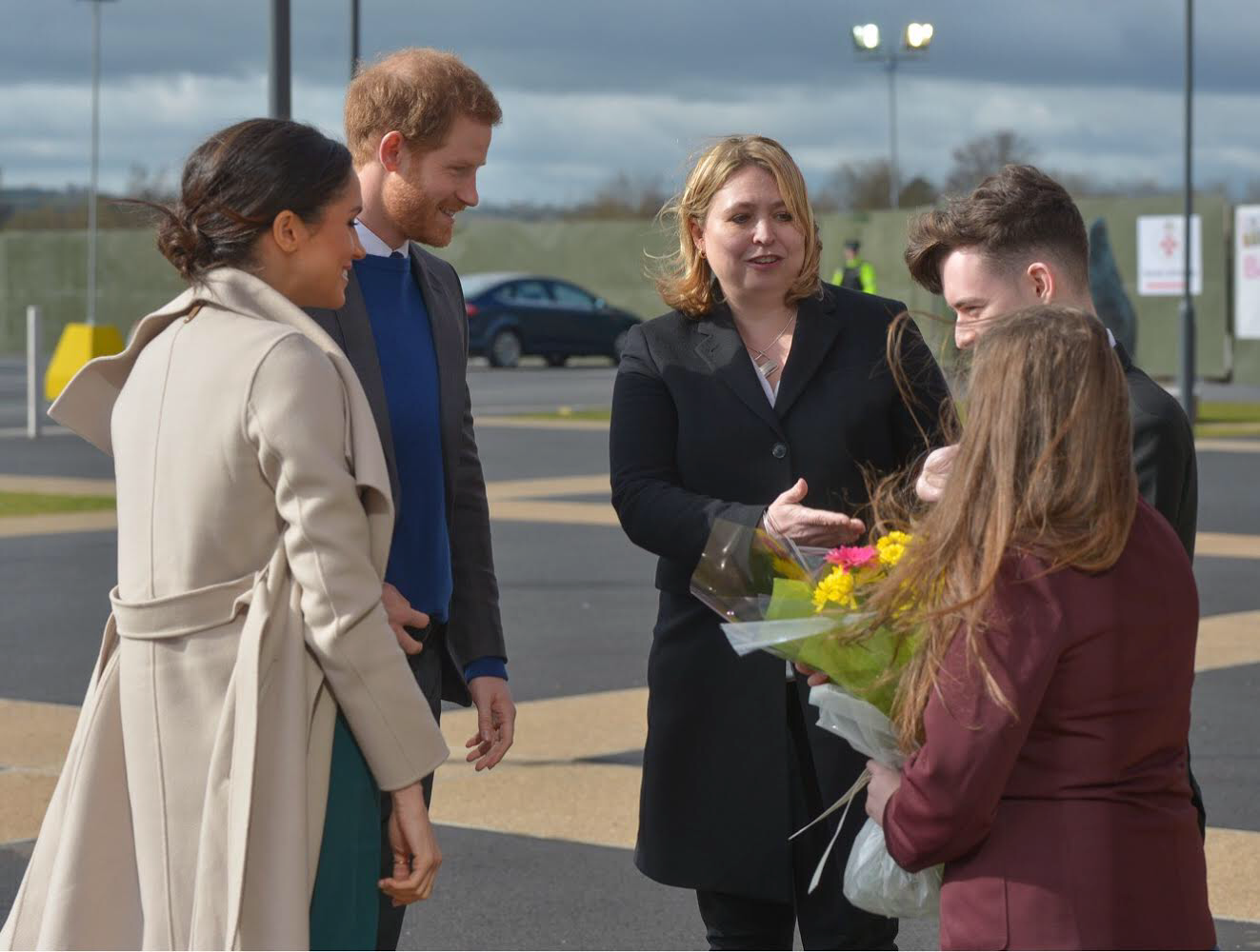
Bradley welcomes the Duke and Duchess of Sussex as they embark on their first visit to Northern Ireland as a couple

Following her election to Parliament in 2010, Bradley was a member of the Work and Pensions Select Committee between July 2010 and October 2012, the Procedure Committee between October 2011 and November 2012, and in May 2012 was elected co-secretary of the backbench 1922 Committee.

In September 2012, Bradley was appointed as a junior Government whip. In December 2012, Bradley joined the Administration Committee, of which she was a member until March 2014. In February 2014, Bradley joined the Home Office as the Parliamentary Under-Secretary of State for Preventing Abuse, Exploitation and Crime.

At the 2015 general election, Bradley was re-elected as MP for Staffordshire Moorlands with an increased vote share of 51.1% and an increased majority of 10,174.

In July 2016, Bradley was appointed to the position of Secretary of State for Culture, Media and Sport by Prime Minister Theresa May. In late November 2016, she denied the appointment of Althea Efunshile, a former deputy chief of Arts Council England, as a non-executive director on the board of the state-owned broadcaster, Channel 4. She was criticised because Efunshile was a black female candidate while the other four candidates were all white men and were either appointed or re-appointed. This action led to a letter of complaint being sent to her by a cross-party group of MPs. On 12 December 2017, the government announced the appointment which her successor ratified.

Bradley was again re-elected at the snap 2017 general election with an increased vote share of 58.1% and an increased majority of 10,830.

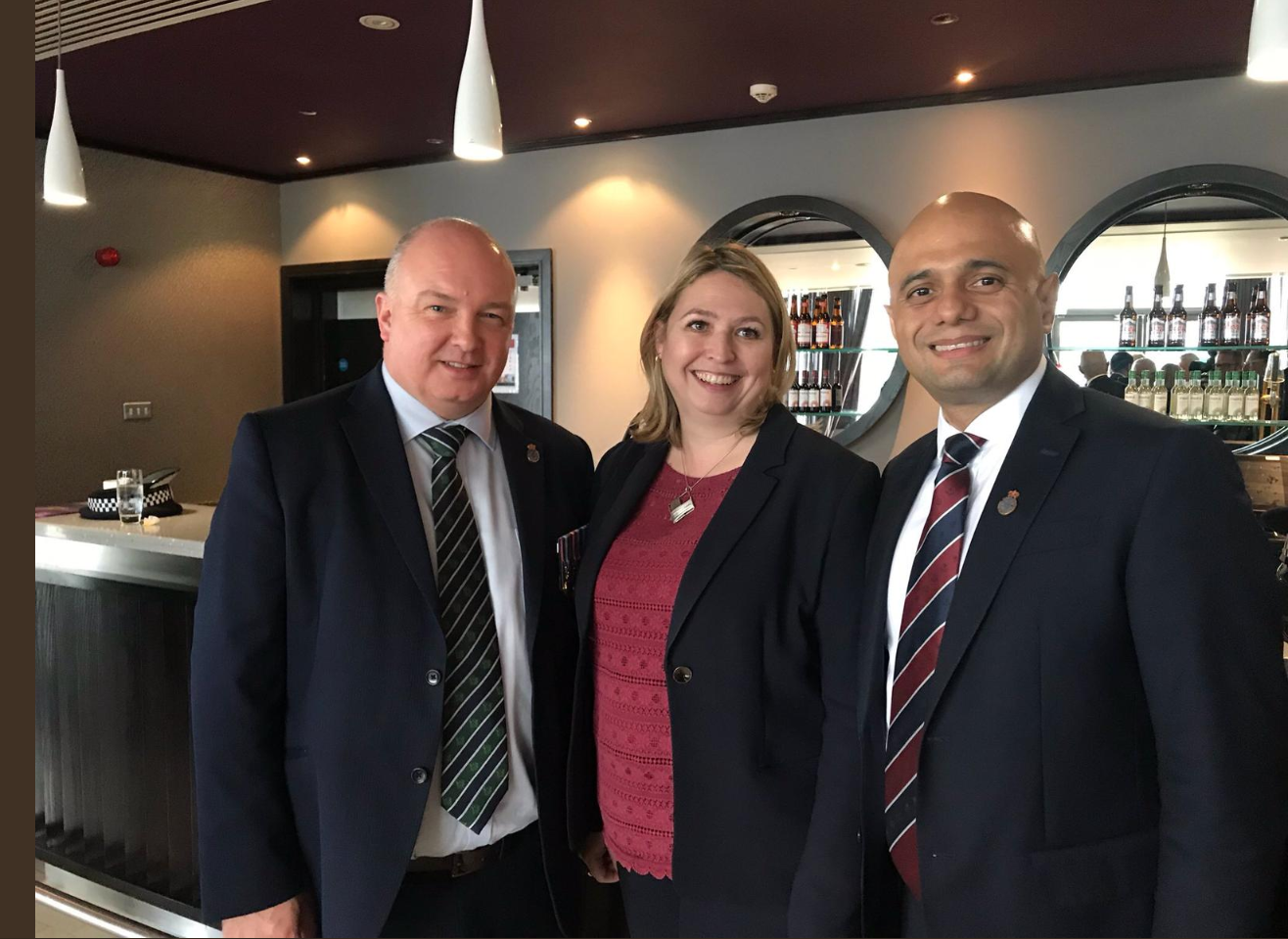
Karen Bradley attended National Police Memorial Day with then Home Secretary Sajid Javid (right).

In January 2018, Bradley was appointed Secretary of State for Northern Ireland after the resignation of James Brokenshire due to ill health. In July 2018, she came under criticism in the Northern Ireland Affairs Committee for failing to take action on British government discrimination against former soldiers and police. Andrew Murrison challenged her on her account of what she had done, and she said she would write to him. Sylvia Hermon commented: "I wait and wait for letters."

In a September 2018 interview for House magazine, a weekly publication for the Houses of Parliament, Bradley admitted she had not understood Northern Irish politics before being appointed Secretary of State for Northern Ireland, saying: "I didn't understand things like when elections are fought, for example, in Northern Ireland – people who are nationalists don't vote for unionist parties and vice versa," she said.

In March 2019, Bradley defended killings by security forces during the Troubles in the Northern Ireland, stating that "The fewer than 10% [of killings] that were at the hands of the military and police were not crimes, they were people acting under orders and fulfilling their duties in a dignified and appropriate way.". This comment was criticised by numerous political parties in Northern Ireland, and some made calls for her to resign. A "clarification" on her remarks was issued by Bradley later that day in the House of Commons, and the following day she issued an apology. The families of those who died on Bloody Sunday in January 1972 claimed that Bradley was attempting to interfere in the British government's decision on whether or not to prosecute the soldiers involved in the incident.

Bradley was dismissed as Northern Ireland Secretary by Prime Minister Boris Johnson upon his appointment in July 2019.

At the 2019 general election, Bradley was again re-elected with an increased vote share of 64.5% and an increased majority of 16,428. She was again re-elected at the 2024 general election, with a decreased vote share of 35.4% and a decreased majority of 1,175.

After the 2024 general election, Bradley was elected Chair of the Home Affairs Select Committee.

== Personal life ==
Bradley is married to Neil Bradley. They have two sons. She is a fan of Manchester City Football Club.

She was appointed a Dame Commander of the Order of the British Empire (DBE) in the 2023 Political Honours for public and political service.

== Notes ==
Parliament of the United Kingdom
Preceded by Charlotte Atkins	Member of Parliament for Staffordshire Moorlands; 2010–present	Incumbent
Political offices
Preceded by John Whittingdale	Secretary of State for Digital, Culture, Media and Sport; 2016–2018	Succeeded by Matt Hancock
Preceded by James Brokenshire	Secretary of State for Northern Ireland; 2018–2019	Succeeded by Julian Smith
