= Harry Davenport (footballer) =

Australian rules footballer

Personal information
- Full name: Harold John Davenport
- Born: 19 February 1900; Carlton, Victoria
- Died: 22 October 1984 (aged 84); Prahran, Victoria
- Original team: South Melbourne Districts

Playing career^{1}
Years	Club	Games (Goals)
1921	South Melbourne	1 (0)
- ^{1} Playing statistics correct to the end of 1921.

Harold John Davenport (19 February 1900 – 22 October 1984) was an Australian rules footballer who played with South Melbourne in the Victorian Football League (VFL).
