= Harold Davies, Baron Davies of Leek =

British politician

The Right Honourable The Lord Davies of Leek PC

Parliamentary Private Secretary to the Prime Minister
- In office 7 January 1967 – 19 June 1970
- Prime Minister: Harold Wilson
- Preceded by: Peter Shore
- Succeeded by: Eric Varley

Parliamentary Secretary to the Minister for Pensions
- In office 20 October 1964 – 7 January 1967
- Prime Minister: Harold Wilson
- Preceded by: Lynch Maydon
- Succeeded by: Charles Loughlin

Member of the House of Lords Lord Temporal
- In office 28 September 1970 – 28 October 1985; Life Peerage

Member of Parliament for Leek
- In office 5 July 1945 – 29 May 1970
- Preceded by: William Bromfield
- Succeeded by: David Knox

Personal details
- Born: 31 July 1904
- Died: 28 October 1985 (aged 81)
- Party: Labour

Harold Davies, Baron Davies of Leek, PC (31 July 1904 – 28 October 1985) was a British Labour Party politician.

He was elected at the 1945 general election as Member of Parliament (MP) for Leek in Staffordshire, and held the seat until his defeat at the 1970 general election by the Conservative candidate David Knox. Davies was subsequently created a life peer on 28 September 1970, as Baron Davies of Leek, of Leek in the County of Stafford.

== Parliamentary career ==
Davies was elected in 1945 for his large north Staffordshire seat that included a northern part of the Newcastle-under-Lyme-Stoke-on-Trent conurbation, partly employed in the increasingly uncompetitive basic clothes textiles manufacturing (see William Bromfield) but also, in the towns themselves, as today, also having major employment in the high quality, niche firms comprising the Staffordshire Potteries. Amid all the change towards advanced machinery and engineering in the area, he managed to retain the seat during the Third Churchill ministry and its two conservative following ministries led by Eden and Macmillan.

He was always associated with the left of the party and was involved with the "Keep Left" and Bevanites. He was an assiduous local MP but his left wing views led to him being overlooked for Ministerial office during the Attlee governments (1945–51).

He was Parliamentary Secretary to the Ministry of Pensions from 1964 to 1966, and then Parliamentary Secretary to the Minister of Social Security until 1967. Afterwards, he became Parliamentary Private Secretary to Prime Minister Harold Wilson between 1967 and 1970. He was made a Privy Councillor in 1969.

=== Vietnam War Talks envoy ===
Appointed to junior office by Harold Wilson, Davies made headlines when Wilson despatched him on a "secret" mission to Hanoi. This was an attempt to broker talks between the North Vietnamese leader Ho Chi Minh and the Americans and their allies. Wilson's policy of support for the US was generally unpopular, and poorly supported within the Labour Party. But his stated commitment to the "special relationship" with the US, and the need for US economic support, meant that he continued to lend his government's support to the US policy of military involvement in Vietnam.

Davies, left wing and anti-militaristic, lent an air of conviction to putting out peace feelers. But the mission went badly, with its secrecy blown before Davies emerged from his plane in Hanoi. The Americans were furious, UK diplomats embarrassed and angry and Ho Chi Minh refused to meet Davies, who had been made to look foolish.

When in the Commons, Davies led the 40-strong group of members who spoke Esperanto.

Parliament of the United Kingdom
| Preceded by William Bromfield | Member of Parliament for Leek; 1945–1970 | Succeeded by David Knox |
