= Harry Davenport (British politician) =

British barrister and politician

Harry Tichborne Davenport J.P. (31 October 1833 – 19 March 1895), known from 1890 as Harry Tichborne Hinckes, was a British barrister and Conservative Party politician who was elected to the House of Commons for constituencies in his native Staffordshire on two occasions in the 1880s.

== Early life ==
Davenport was the son of John Davenport of Westwood, Staffordshire, a Justice of the Peace and a Deputy Lieutenant of the county. He was educated at Harrow and at Christ Church, Oxford, and was called to the bar in 1860 at the Inner Temple. He later followed in his father's footsteps and became a magistrate, and in 1889 was appointed as an honorary Commissioner in lunacy.

== Political career ==
He first stood for Parliament at the 1874 general election in Newcastle-under-Lyme, and was unsuccessful again at a by-election in Stoke-upon-Trent in February 1875.

At the 1880 general election Davenport was elected as one of the two Members of Parliament (MPs) for the Northern division of Staffordshire. He held that seat for 5 years, until the division was abolished under the Redistribution of Seats Act 1885, when the two-member county divisions and many parliamentary boroughs were replaced with new single-member county divisions. Davenport stood in the new Leek division at the 1885 general election, where he was narrowly beaten by the Liberal Party candidate Charles Crompton.

At the 1886 election, he overturned Compton's majority and was returned to the Commons as MP for Leek. However, he did not defend his seat in 1892, when he retired from Parliament.

== Personal life ==
Davenport was married in 1868 to Georgiana Henrietta, the eldest daughter of Sir William Curtis, 3rd Baronet, a former High Sheriff of Shropshire. They had no children.

In 1881, his clubs were listed as the United University Club and the Carlton Club.

On 12 November 1890, near the end of his political career, he changed his surname by Royal Licence to Hinckes, to fulfil a condition in the will of Theodosia Hinckes.

He died on 19 March 1895, and his estate was bequeathed to his nephew Ralph Tichborne Davenport.

Parliament of the United Kingdom
Preceded by Robert William Hanbury; Colin Minton Campbell	Member of Parliament for North Staffordshire; 1880 – 1885; With: William Young Craig	Constituency abolished
Preceded by Charles Crompton	Member of Parliament for Leek; 1886 – 1892	Succeeded by Charles Bill
