= William Bromfield =

British politician

Member of Parliament for Leek
- In office 14 November 1935 – 15 June 1945
- Preceded by: Arthur Ratcliffe
- Succeeded by: Harold Davies
- In office 14 December 1918 – 27 October 1931
- Preceded by: Sir Robert Pearce
- Succeeded by: Arthur Ratcliffe

Personal details
- Born: 24 January 1868
- Died: 3 June 1950 (aged 82)
- Party: Labour

William Bromfield (24 January 1868 – 3 June 1950) was an English trade unionist and Labour Party politician from Leek in Staffordshire. He was the town's Member of Parliament (MP) for all but four of the years between 1918 and 1945.

Bromfield came to prominence in the local trade union movement in the early 1900s. William Stubbs had been the leader of almost all the many small unions of silk workers in the town, but he was ageing, and by 1907, Bromfield had taken over from him as secretary of the Amalgamated Society of Winders, Fillers and Braid Makers, the Amalgamated Society of Silk Spinners and Throwsters, the Amalgamated Society of Female Silk Operatives, and the Leek Amalgamated Society of Silk and Cotton Dyers. He also succeeded James Cockersole as secretary of the Associated Trimming Weavers' Society.

In 1907, all the unions led by Bromfield, with the Amalgamated Society of Silk Pickers, still led by Stubbs, affiliated to the new Leek Textile Federation. In an election to become general secretary of the federation, Bromfield defeated Stubbs. In 1919, the unions merged to form the Amalgamated Society of Textile Workers and Kindred Trades (ASTWKT), whose membership covered Staffordshire and South Cheshire, and Bromfield was elected as its secretary, serving until 1942.

== Political career ==
At the post-war general election in December 1918, Bromfield was elected as the MP for the Leek division of Staffordshire, becoming the constituency's first Labour MP. He defeated Rear-Admiral Sir Guy Gaunt, a Liberal who supported the Coalition Government by 678 votes. He held the seat at the four elections in the 1920s, increasing his majority to 17% of the votes by 1929, but was narrowly defeated at the 1931 election, when there was a nationwide swing towards the National Government.

He was returned to the House of Commons at the 1935 election, and held the seat until he stood down at the July 1945 election.

Parliament of the United Kingdom
Preceded by Sir Robert Pearce	Member of Parliament for Leek; 1918 – 1931	Succeeded by Arthur Ratcliffe
Preceded by Arthur Ratcliffe	Member of Parliament for Leek; 1935 – 1945	Succeeded by Harold Davies
