= Leek (constituency) =

Parliamentary constituency in the United Kingdom, 1885–1983

- Former county constituency for the House of Commons
- County: Staffordshire
- Major settlements: Leek

1885–1983
- Seats: One
- Created from: North Staffordshire
- Replaced by: Staffordshire Moorlands and Stoke-on-Trent North

Leek was a parliamentary constituency in Staffordshire which returned one Member of Parliament (MP) to the House of Commons of the Parliament of the United Kingdom.

Centred on the market town of Leek, it was created under the Redistribution of Seats Act 1885 for the 1885 general election, and abolished nearly 100 years later for the 1983 general election. It was then largely replaced by the new Staffordshire Moorlands constituency.

== Members of Parliament ==
Election	Member	Party
1885	Charles Crompton	Liberal
1886	Harry Davenport	Conservative
1892	Charles Bill	Conservative
1906	Robert Pearce	Liberal
1910, Jan	Arthur Heath	Conservative
1910, Dec	Sir Robert Pearce	Liberal
1918	William Bromfield	Labour
1931	Arthur Ratcliffe	Conservative
1935	William Bromfield	Labour
1945	Harold Davies	Labour
1970	David Knox	Conservative
1983	constituency abolished. see Staffordshire Moorlands	

== Elections ==
=== Elections in the 1880s ===
General election 1885: Leek
Party	Candidate	Votes	%	±%
Liberal	Charles Crompton	4,225	51.0	
Conservative	Harry Davenport	4,063	49.0	
Majority		162	2.0	
Turnout		8,288	81.0	
Registered electors		10,234		
Liberal win (new seat)				

General election 1886: Leek
Party	Candidate	Votes	%	±%
Conservative	Harry Davenport	4,324	54.1	+5.1
Liberal	Charles Crompton	3,669	45.9	−5.1
Majority		655	8.2	N/A
Turnout		7,993	78.1	−2.9
Registered electors		10,234		
Conservative gain from Liberal		Swing	+5.1	

=== Elections in the 1890s ===
Charles Bill

General election 1892: Leek
Party	Candidate	Votes	%	±%
Conservative	Charles Bill	4,576	52.1	−2.0
Liberal	Joshua Oldfield Nicholson	4,213	47.9	+2.0
Majority		363	4.2	−4.0
Turnout		8,789	80.2	+2.1
Registered electors		10,961		
Conservative hold		Swing	−2.0	

General election 1895: Leek
Party	Candidate	Votes	%	±%
Conservative	Charles Bill	4,705	53.5	+1.4
Liberal	Robert Pearce	4,091	46.5	−1.4
Majority		614	7.0	+2.8
Turnout		8,796	78.7	−1.5
Registered electors		11,182		
Conservative hold		Swing	+1.4	

=== Elections in the 1900s ===
General election 1900: Leek
Party	Candidate	Votes	%	±%
Conservative	Charles Bill	4,800	54.3	+0.8
Liberal	Robert Pearce	4,041	45.7	−0.8
Majority		759	8.6	+1.6
Turnout		8,841	80.3	+1.6
Registered electors		11,006		
Conservative hold		Swing	+0.8	

Robert Pearce

General election 1906: Leek
Party	Candidate	Votes	%	±%
Liberal	Robert Pearce	5,749	57.4	+11.7
Conservative	Charles Bill	4,275	42.6	−11.7
Majority		1,474	14.8	N/A
Turnout		10,024	86.8	+6.5
Registered electors		11,545		
Liberal gain from Conservative		Swing	+11.7	

=== Elections in the 1910s ===
General election January 1910: Leek
Party	Candidate	Votes	%	±%
Conservative	Arthur Heath	5,463	50.0	+7.4
Liberal	Robert Pearce	5,453	50.0	−7.4
Majority		10	0.0	N/A
Turnout		10,916	90.4	+3.6
Registered electors		12,079		
Conservative gain from Liberal		Swing	+7.4	

General election December 1910: Leek
Party	Candidate	Votes	%	±%
Liberal	Robert Pearce	5,742	52.7	+2.7
Conservative	William Bromley-Davenport	5,152	47.3	−2.7
Majority		590	5.4	N/A
Turnout		10,894	90.2	−0.2
Registered electors		12,079		
Liberal gain from Conservative		Swing	+2.7	

General Election 1914–15:

Another General Election was required to take place before the end of 1915. The political parties had been making preparations for an election to take place and by July 1914, the following candidates had been selected;

- Liberal: Robert Pearce
- Unionist:
- Labour:

General election 1918: Leek
Party		Candidate	Votes	%	±%
	Labour	William Bromfield	10,510	51.7	New
C	Liberal	Guy Gaunt	9,832	48.3	−4.4
Majority			678	3.4	N/A
Turnout			20,342	67.7	−22.5
Registered electors			30,055		
	Labour gain from Liberal		Swing		
C indicates candidate endorsed by the coalition government.

=== Elections in the 1920s ===
General election 1922: Leek
Party	Candidate	Votes	%	±%
Labour	William Bromfield	12,857	50.8	−0.9
Unionist	Enoch Hill	12,473	49.2	N/A
Majority		384	1.6	−1.8
Turnout		25,330	78.7	+11.0
Registered electors		32,175		
Labour hold		Swing		

General election 1923: Leek
Party	Candidate	Votes	%	±%
Labour	William Bromfield	13,913	53.6	+2.8
Unionist	Enoch Hill	12,066	46.4	−2.8
Majority		1,847	7.2	+5.6
Turnout		25,979	77.3	−1.4
Registered electors		33,596		
Labour hold		Swing	+2.8	

General election 1924: Leek
Party	Candidate	Votes	%	±%
Labour	William Bromfield	14,256	51.7	−1.9
Unionist	Thomas Cholmondeley	13,305	48.3	+1.9
Majority		951	3.4	−3.8
Turnout		27,561	79.5	+2.2
Registered electors		34,686		
Labour hold		Swing	−1.9	

General election 1929: Leek
Party	Candidate	Votes	%	±%
Labour	William Bromfield	22,458	58.5	+6.8
Unionist	Edward Hulton	15,953	41.5	−6.8
Majority		6,505	17.0	+13.6
Turnout		38,411	82.4	+2.9
Registered electors		46,588		
Labour hold		Swing	+6.8	

=== Elections in the 1930s ===
General election 1931: Leek
Party	Candidate	Votes	%	±%
Conservative	Arthur Ratcliffe	20,067	51.39	
Labour	William Bromfield	18,979	48.61	
Majority		1,088	2.78	N/A
Turnout		39,046		
Conservative gain from Labour		Swing		

General election 1935: Leek
Party	Candidate	Votes	%	±%
Labour	William Bromfield	23,432	57.36	
National Labour	Leslie Thomas	17,419	42.64	
Majority		6,013	14.72	N/A
Turnout		40,851		
Labour gain from Conservative		Swing		

=== Elections in the 1940s ===
General Election 1939–40

Another General Election was required to take place before the end of 1940. The political parties had been making preparations for an election to take place and by the Autumn of 1939, the following candidates had been selected;

- Labour: Harold Davies
- Conservative: John H Wain

General election 1945: Leek
Party	Candidate	Votes	%	±%
Labour	Harold Davies	32,567	67.19	
Conservative	T.W. Gimson	15,904	32.81	
Majority		16,663	34.38	
Turnout		48,471	76.74	
Labour hold		Swing		

=== Elections in the 1950s ===
General election 1950: Leek
Party	Candidate	Votes	%	±%
Labour	Harold Davies	30,444	53.78	
Conservative	Rupert Speir	25,820	46.22	
Majority		4,224	7.56	
Turnout		56,264	86.05	
Labour hold		Swing		

General election 1951: Leek
Party	Candidate	Votes	%	±%
Labour	Harold Davies	29,502	51.67	
Conservative	Richard Body	27,592	48.33	
Majority		1,910	3.34	
Turnout		57,094	86.18	
Labour hold		Swing		

General election 1955: Leek
Party	Candidate	Votes	%	±%
Labour	Harold Davies	28,273	50.95	
Conservative	Mervyn Pike	27,214	49.05	
Majority		1,059	1.90	
Turnout		55,487	81.52	
Labour hold		Swing		

General election 1959: Leek
Party	Candidate	Votes	%	±%
Labour	Harold Davies	31,096	50.94	
Conservative	John Wedgwood	29,947	49.06	
Majority		1,149	1.88	
Turnout		61,043	83.88	
Labour hold		Swing		

=== Elections in the 1960s ===
General election 1964: Leek
Party	Candidate	Votes	%	±%
Labour	Harold Davies	33,558	53.29	
Conservative	Harry Goodwin	29,409	46.71	
Majority		4,419	6.58	
Turnout		62,967		
Labour hold		Swing		

General election 1966: Leek
Party	Candidate	Votes	%	±%
Labour	Harold Davies	35,334	56.17	
Conservative	Frank Swinnerton	27,573	43.83	
Majority		7,761	12.34	
Turnout		62,907		
Labour hold		Swing		

=== Elections in the 1970s ===
General election 1970: Leek
Party	Candidate	Votes	%	±%
Conservative	David Knox	27,899	46.13	
Labour	Harold Davies	26,359	43.59	
Liberal	Richard Malcolm Burman	6,219	10.28	New
Majority		1,540	2.54	N/A
Turnout		60,477	67.44	
Conservative gain from Labour		Swing		

General election February 1974: Leek
Party	Candidate	Votes	%	±%
Conservative	David Knox	31,526	45.57	
Labour	Roy Delville Roebuck	25,794	37.29	
Liberal	Richard Malcolm Burman	11,860	17.14	
Majority		5,732	8.28	
Turnout		69,180		
Conservative hold		Swing		

General election October 1974: Leek
Party	Candidate	Votes	%	±%
Conservative	David Knox	30,796	46.74	
Labour	B Whittam	26,472	40.18	
Liberal	M Holden	8,615	13.08	
Majority		4,324	6.56	
Turnout		65,883	78.50	
Conservative hold		Swing		

General election 1979: Leek
Party	Candidate	Votes	%	±%
Conservative	David Knox	36,508	51.88	
Labour	Mark Fisher	25,937	36.86	
Liberal	M Conway	6,474	9.20	
Ratepayer	CI Bailey	1,451	2.06	New
Majority		10,571	15.02	
Turnout		70,370	80.42	
Conservative hold		Swing		
