= Stoke-on-Trent, Stoke =

Parliamentary constituency in the United Kingdom, 1918–1950

Stoke
- Former borough constituency for the House of Commons

1918–1950
- Seats: One
- Created from: Stoke-upon-Trent
- Replaced by: Stoke-on-Trent Central, Stoke-on-Trent North and Stoke-on-Trent South

Stoke was a borough constituency in Stoke-on-Trent which returned one Member of Parliament (MP) to the House of Commons of the UK Parliament, a new name and form of a seat which had existed from the Reform Act 1832. Elections were held using the first past the post voting system.

== History ==
The constituency was created for the 1918 general election, and abolished for the 1950 general election.

== Members of Parliament ==
Election	Member	Party
1918	John Ward	Coalition Liberal
1922	John Ward	National Liberal
1923	John Ward	Liberal
1923	John Ward	Constitutionalist, then Liberal
1929	Lady Mosley	Labour
1931	Lady Mosley	New Party
1931	Ida Copeland	Conservative
1935	Ellis Smith	Labour
1950	constituency abolished	

== Election results ==
=== Elections in the 1910s ===
Ward

General election 1918: Stoke-on-Trent
Party		Candidate	Votes	%	±%
C	Liberal	John Ward	Unopposed		
	Liberal win (new seat)				
C indicates candidate endorsed by the coalition government.

=== Elections in the 1920s ===
General election 1922: Stoke-on-Trent
Party	Candidate	Votes	%	±%
National Liberal	John Ward	16,685	61.3	N/A
Labour	John Watts	10,522	38.7	New
Majority		6,163	22.6	N/A
Turnout		27,207	68.0	N/A
National Liberal hold		Swing	N/A	

General election 1923: Stoke-on-Trent
Party	Candidate	Votes	%	±%
Liberal	John Ward	13,119	51.2	−10.1
Labour	John Watts	12,502	48.8	+10.1
Majority		617	2.4	−20.2
Turnout		25,621	63.2	−4.8
Liberal hold		Swing	-10.1	

General election 1924: Stoke-on-Trent
Party	Candidate	Votes	%	±%
Constitutionalist	John Ward	17,864	57.3	+6.1
Labour	John Watts	13,318	42.7	−6.1
Majority		4,546	14.6	+12.2
Turnout		31,182	75.4	+12.2
Constitutionalist hold		Swing	+6.1	

General election 1929: Stoke-on-Trent
Party	Candidate	Votes	%	±%
Labour	Cynthia Mosley	26,548	58.7	+16.0
Liberal	John Ward	18,698	41.3	−16.0
Majority		7,850	17.4	32.0
Turnout		45,246	81.2	+5.8
Labour gain from Liberal		Swing	+16.0	

=== Elections in the 1930s ===
General election 1931: Stoke-on-Trent
Party	Candidate	Votes	%	±%
Conservative	Ida Copeland	19,918	45.56	
Labour	Ellis Smith	13,264	30.34	
New Party	Oswald Mosley	10,534	24.10	New
Majority		6,654	15.22	N/A
Turnout		43,716	75.88	
Conservative gain from Labour		Swing		

General election 1935: Stoke-on-Trent
Party	Candidate	Votes	%	±%
Labour	Ellis Smith	20,992	52.67	
Conservative	Ida Copeland	18,867	47.33	
Majority		2,125	5.34	N/A
Turnout		39,859	69.98	
Labour gain from Conservative		Swing		

=== Elections in the 1940s ===
General Election 1939–40:

Another General Election was required to take place before the end of 1940. The political parties had been making preparations for an election to take place from 1939 and by the end of this year, the following candidates had been selected;

- Labour: Ellis Smith

General election 1945: Stoke-on-Trent
Party	Candidate	Votes	%	±%
Labour	Ellis Smith	29,551	69.12	
Conservative	W.P. Wentworth Shields	13,203	30.88	
Majority		16,348	38.24	
Turnout		42,754	75.68	
Labour hold		Swing		
