= Quentin Summerfield =

British psychologist

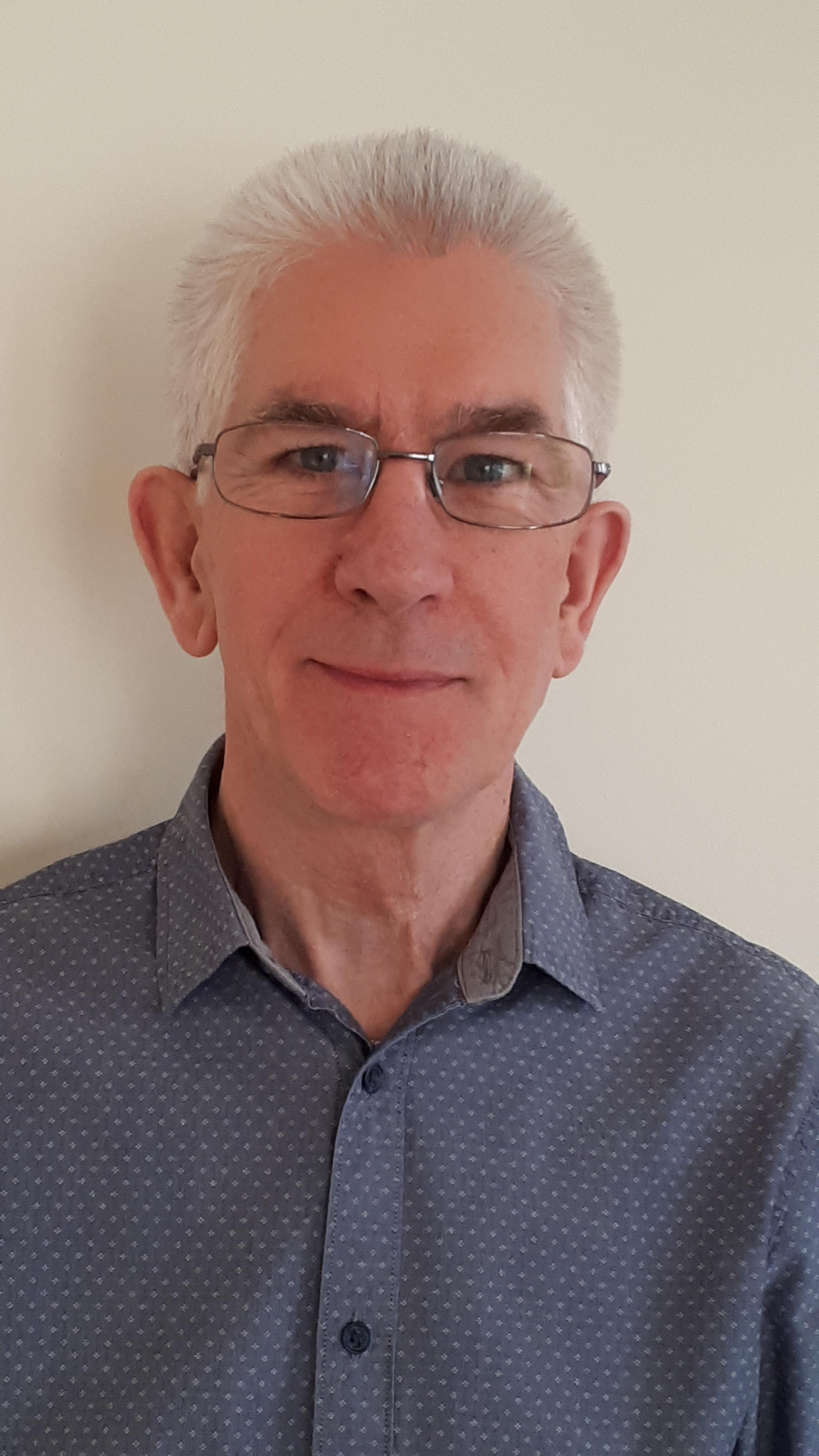
- Quentin Summerfield in 2018
- Born: London
- Occupation: Psychologist
- Known for: MBE for services to psychology and people with hearing loss

Quentin Summerfield is a British psychologist, specialising in hearing. He joined the Medical Research Council (United Kingdom) Institute of Hearing Research in 1977 and served as its deputy director from 1993 to 2004, before moving on to a chair in psychology at The University of York. He served as head of the Psychology department from 2011 to 2017 and retired in 2018, becoming an emeritus professor. From 2013 to 2018, he was a member of the University of York's Finance & Policy Committee. From 2015 to 2018, he was a member of York University's governing body, the Council.

Summerfield was awarded an MBE in the 2019 New Year Honours, for services to psychology and people with hearing loss.

== Early life and education ==
Quentin Summerfield was born in London to Arthur Summerfield, Professor of Psychology at Birkbeck College and Aline Whalley, an Educational Psychologist. His sister, Penny Summerfield, is an emerita Professor of Modern History at the University of Manchester.

Summerfield grew up in Muswell Hill in North London, attended Tetherdown Primary School and University College School in Hampstead, where he was Head Boy in 1966-67. He studied Natural Sciences at Corpus Christi College, Cambridge, graduating with an upper second class degree in Psychology in 1971. He obtained his doctorate under the supervision of Professor Mark Haggard at Queen's University Belfast in 1975. From 1975 to 1977 he was a NATO post-doctoral Research Fellow at Haskins Laboratories, Yale University.

== Research ==
Summerfield has conducted research on speech perception, as well as applied research on the effectiveness and economics of cochlear implantation.

His research on speech perception included:-

- Speech perception with normal and impaired hearing.
- The processes by which listeners attend to one talker when other talkers are speaking at the same time.
- Lipreading and speechreading, where his work forms the theoretic underpinnings of the field

These and works on speech perception were recognised by his election as a Fellow of the Acoustical Society of America in 1998.

In 1995, Summerfield wrote the Medical Research Council report on the National Cochlear Implant Programme, prompting an editorial in the British Medical Journal that concluded "Cochlear implantation is perhaps the most exciting development in otology this century. The benefits are immense. The report by Summerfield and Marshall confirms that, in the words of the late Graham Fraser, the founder of the British Cochlear Implant Group, 'Cochlear implants work.'" An article in ENT and Audiology News reported that "This was a pivotal step for the introduction of NHS (National Health Service) funding." The report resulted in the George Davey Howells Memorial Prize for his research group from the University of London (1995), the Thomas Simm Littler Prize from the British Society of Audiology (1996), and the Edith Whetnall Memorial Medal from Otology Section of the Royal College of Medicine (1996). Subsequent research contributed evidence that was used by the National Institute for Health and Care Excellence in framing guidance on cochlear implantation and in 2002 and resulted in the Ear and Hearing editors' award from the American Auditory Society.

That research was followed by a series of papers exploring the criteria for candidacy in cochlear implantation in Ear and Hearing that attracted a special statement from the editorial board, which reads:

In the often fractious arenas of healthcare in general — and cochlear implants specifically — it is a pleasure to note that the expert reviewers and the editors are all united in our assessment that the papers represent excellent scholarly work that will be studied carefully by clinicians, healthcare organizations, and researchers for many years to come. The importance of this series of papers extends well beyond the domain of unilateral cochlear implantation in postlingually deafened adults. Instead, the framework used by Summerfield and colleagues will serve as a high standard for the evaluation of candidature for other medical interventions. We are proud to be publishing these papers and to reflect on the significant research contributions that many of our readers have made so that this elegant and powerful work was possible.

== Societal contributions ==
Summerfield has been Chair of the Scottish National Services Division's Quinquennial Review of the provision of cochlear-implantation services. He served as a member of the Medical Scientific Advisory Committee of the Royal National Institute for Deaf People from 1999 to 2005, and chaired the Committee from 2003 to 2005. He served as Chief Research Advisor to the charity, Deafness Research UK, from 2007 to 2011.

In 2013 he was elected a trustee of the charity, Action on Hearing Loss (formerly the Royal National Institute for Deaf People), and re-elected in 2016. He currently also serves as a member of the Board and of the Nominations Committee.
