= Staffordshire East (European Parliament constituency) =

Former European Parliament constituency

- European Parliament constituency
- Boundary within the West Midlands (1979-1984)
- Member state: United Kingdom
- Created: 1979
- Dissolved: 1994
- MEPs: 1

Prior to its uniform adoption of proportional representation in 1999, the United Kingdom used first-past-the-post for the European elections in England, Scotland and Wales. The European Parliament constituencies used under that system were smaller than the later regional constituencies and only had one Member of the European Parliament each.

The constituency of Staffordshire East was one of them.

When it was created in England in 1979, it consisted of the Westminster Parliament constituencies of Burton, Cannock, Leek, Lichfield and Tamworth, Stoke-on-Trent Central, Stoke-on-Trent North, Stoke-on-Trent South, although this may not have been true for the whole of its existence.

Boundary within the West Midlands (1984-1994)

== MEPs ==
Elected	Member	Party
1979	Robert Moreland	Conservative
1984	George Stevenson	Labour
1994	Constituency abolished	

== Election results ==
European Parliament election, 1979: Staffordshire East
Party	Candidate	Votes	%	±%
Conservative	Robert Moreland	70,836	48.7	
Labour	M. P. Tracy	64,230	44.1	
Liberal	B. Hargreaves	10,409	7.2	
Majority		6,606	4.6	
Turnout		145,475	28.4	
Conservative win (new seat)				

European Parliament election, 1984: Staffordshire East
Party	Candidate	Votes	%	±%
Labour	George Stevenson	76,753	44.7	+0.6
Conservative	Robert Moreland	68,886	40.1	−8.6
SDP	Roger G. Fox	26,093	15.2	+8.0
Majority		7,867	4.6	N/A
Turnout		171,732	30.5	+2.1
Labour gain from Conservative		Swing		

European Parliament election, 1989: Staffordshire East
Party	Candidate	Votes	%	±%
Labour	George Stevenson	94,873	50.4	+5.7
Conservative	Michael F. Spungin	63,104	33.5	−6.6
Green	Stephen Parker	23,415	12.4	New
SLD	Rob C. Dodson	7,046	3.7	−11.5
Majority		31,769	16.9	+12.3
Turnout		188,438	32.4	+1.9
Labour hold		Swing		
