= Arthur Summerfield (psychologist) =

British psychologist

- Born: Arthur Summerfield; 1923
- Died: 2005 (aged 81–82)
- Education: University of Manchester
- Scientific career
- Fields: Psychology, Cognitive psychology

Arthur Summerfield (1923–2005) was a British psychologist.

== Career ==
Summerfield initially obtained a degree in electrical engineering from the University of Manchester. During the war he was commissioned as an Electrical Officer in the Fleet Air Arm. However, he was recognised by Alec Rodger who had him transferred to the psychology department in the Admiralty. After the war Summerfield studied psychology at University College London.

Summerfield was appointed head of the Department of Occupational Psychology at Birkbeck College in 1961 and retired in 1988.

He was very active in the British Psychological Society in which he held the post of Honorary Secretary in 1954 and then President in 1963. He chaired the working party on the work of educational psychologists the report of which became known as the Summerfield report. He was also active internationally. He was President of the International Union of Psychological Science from 1972 to 1980 and President of the International Social Science Council from 1977 to 1981.

== Honours ==
- President, British Psychological Society, 1963-1964
- Honorary Fellow, British Psychological Society

== See also ==
- Penny Summerfield
- Quentin Summerfield
