= Robert Moreland =

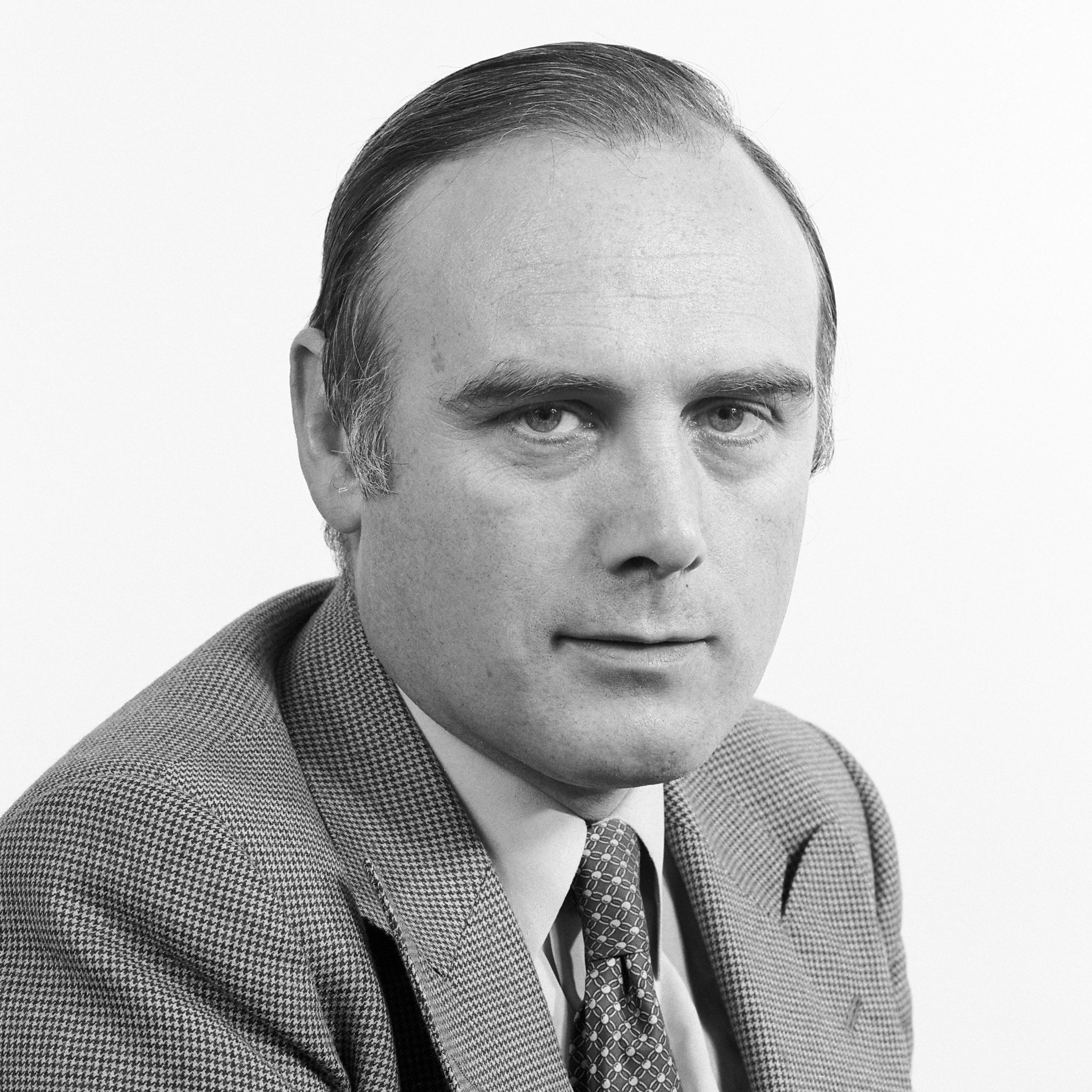
European Parliament portrait

Robert John Moreland (born 21 August 1941) is a British management consultant and Conservative Party politician. After a single term as a Member of the European Parliament (MEP), he served on the Economic and Social Committee of the European Union for twelve years and was elected to two local authorities. He is descended from George Cockle.

== Education ==
Robert Moreland was educated at Bearsden Academy, Glasgow Academy and Dean Close School (in Cheltenham), the latter two private schools. He then studied at the University of Nottingham for an undergraduate degree in Economics and at the Institute of World Affairs in Connecticut and the University of Warwick where he obtained postgraduate qualifications.

== Early career ==
In 1966 Moreland started work in the Civil Service in Canada, at first in the government of Nova Scotia but from 1967 in the government of New Brunswick where he became Assistant Budget Director. In 1972 he returned to Britain to become Senior Economist on the West Central Scotland Planning Study, a job which took two years. In 1974 he began work as a management consultant for Touche Ross, where he remains. Since 2012 he has been a member of the partnership board of the Canal and Rivers Trust for the Severn and South Wales.

== Political involvement ==
Moreland became interested in politics, and at the October 1974 general election he was selected as Conservative Party candidate for Pontypool, a safe Labour seat in south Wales, where he lost with a reduced share of the vote. He was a member of the Bow Group and the Conservative Europe Group. At the 1977 Conservative Party conference, Moreland spoke in favour of sales of council houses, arguing that up to 70% of tenants would like the opportunity to buy their home.

== European Parliament ==
Having chaired the Bow Group's European Committee in 1977–78, Moreland was interested in playing an active part in European politics. At the 1979 election to the European Parliament, Moreland was elected for the Conservative Party in the constituency of Staffordshire East. He was a moderate MEP, criticising the slow pace of reform in South Africa in an emergency debate in June 1980. He also showed a willingness to see the situation from the ground, travelling in 1983 in the cab of long-distance lorries to see the bureaucratic situation which resulted at border crossings. He wrote a pamphlet called "Transport for Europe" based on what he learnt.

== Economic and Social Committee ==
Moreland lost his seat in the 1984 election, but remained interested in the European Union. He wrote to The Times in 1985 to urge British membership of the European Monetary System. He was appointed by the Thatcher government as a member of the UK delegation to the EU's Economic and Social Committee in 1986, and served as Chairman of the Regional Policy and Town and Country Planning Section of the committee from 1990 to 1998.

== Local politics ==
In May 1990, Moreland was elected to Westminster City Council as a Councillor in the Knightsbridge ward, serving in this role until May 1998. He was Deputy Chief Whip for the Conservative group on the council in 1991–93 and Chief Whip in 1993–94. He served as Chairman of the Environment Committee of the Council in 1994–95 and of the Planning and Environment Committee from 1995 to 1997. He was appointed as Deputy Chairman of the London Research Centre and as a Director of the Albert Memorial Trust from 1997 to 2000.

Moreland was nominated to the Conservative Party's list for election to the London Assembly in the 2000 election but was too far down to be elected. He was involved in the London Europe Society and became its deputy chairman in 1997 and chairman in 2000, a post which he currently holds. He was also Treasurer of the European Movement from 2003 to 2008. Moreland also served briefly on Gloucester City Council from 2001 to 2002. He was Chairman of Governors of Archbishop Tenison's C of E School, Lambeth from 2003 to 2011. He was made Deputy Chairman of the Conservative Group for Europe (known as the Conservative Europe Group since 2009) in 2006. Since 2012 member of the partnership board for the Canal and River Trust (formerly British Waterways) for the South Wales and Severn region.

== Offices held ==
European Parliament
New constituency	Member of European Parliament for Staffordshire East; 1979–1984	Succeeded by George Stevenson
