= George Stevenson (British politician) =

British politician

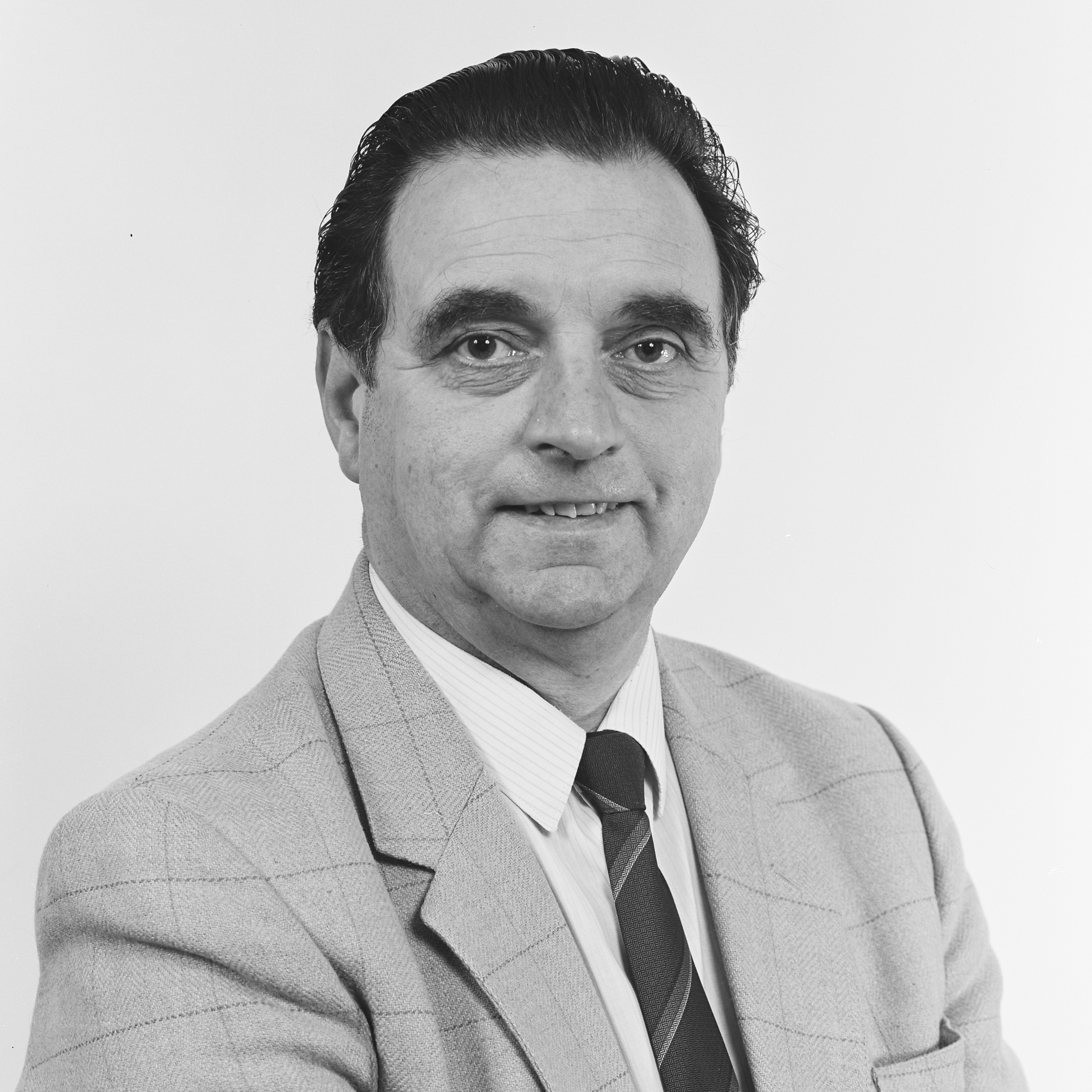
- Official MEP portrait

Member of Parliament for Stoke-on-Trent South
- In office 10 April 1992 – 11 April 2005
- Preceded by: Jack Ashley
- Succeeded by: Rob Flello

Member of the European Parliament for Staffordshire East
- In office 17 June 1984 – 9 June 1994
- Preceded by: Robert Moreland
- Succeeded by: Constituency abolished

Personal details
- Born: 30 August 1938 (age 87)
- Party: Labour

George William Stevenson (born 30 August 1938) is a Labour Party politician in the United Kingdom.

In 1984 he was elected as the Member of the European Parliament (MEP) for Staffordshire East. He was elected member of parliament (MP) for Stoke-on-Trent South at the 1992 general election. He stood down from the European Parliament in 1994 and left the UK parliament at the 2005 general election. He was succeeded as MP for Stoke-on-Trent (South) by Rob Flello of the Labour Party.

He had previously been deputy leader of Stoke-on-Trent City Council. In 2002, Stevenson stood for the Labour Party in the first election for a directly elected mayor for Stoke-on-Trent, losing to the independent candidate Mike Wolfe, a former Labour Party member.

European Parliament
Preceded by Robert Moreland	Member of European Parliament for Staffordshire East; 1984 – 1994	Constituency abolished
Parliament of the United Kingdom
Preceded by Jack Ashley	Member of Parliament for Stoke-on-Trent South; 1992 – 2005	Succeeded by Rob Flello
