= Jack Brereton =

British politician (born 1991)

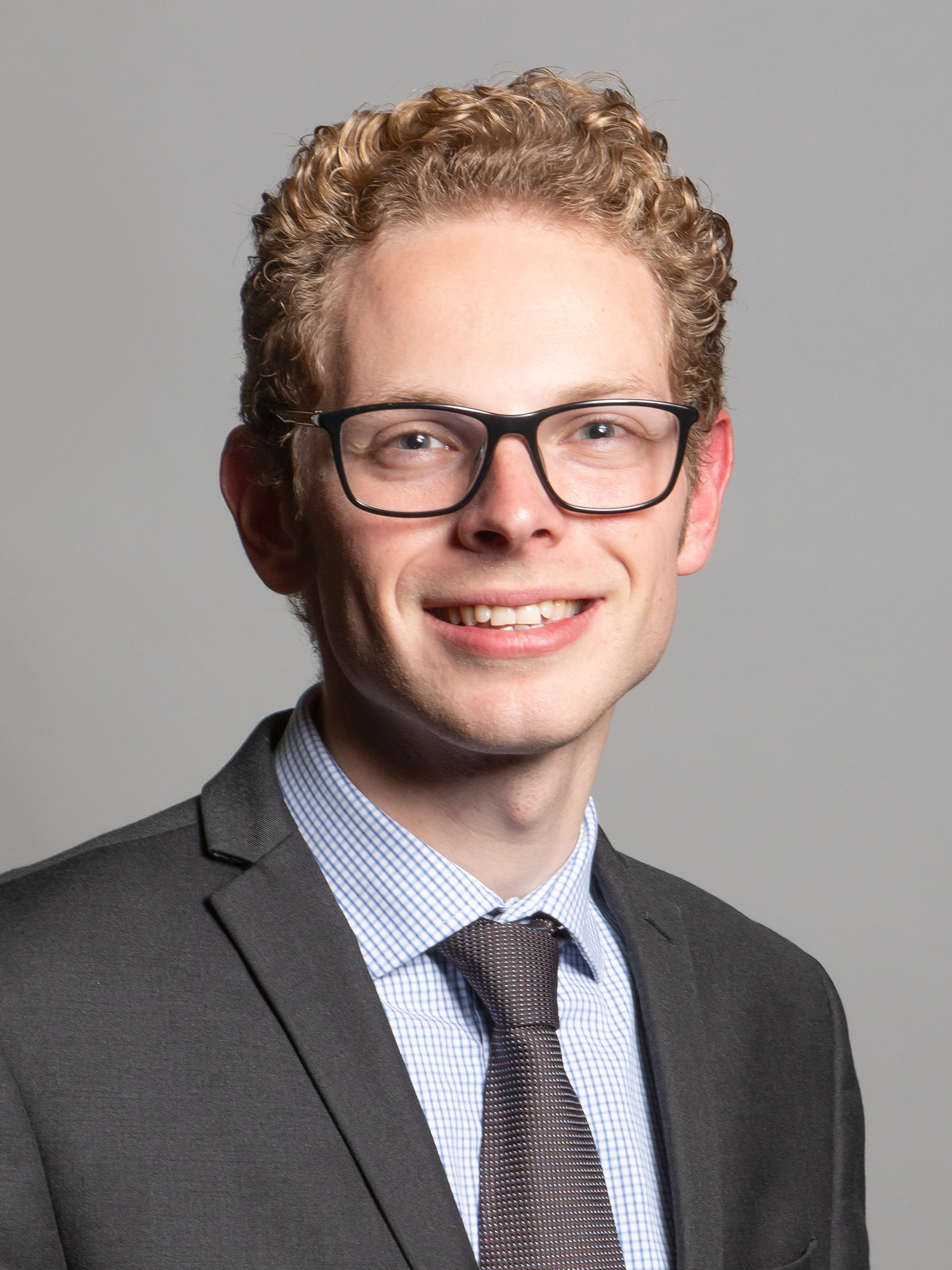
- Official portrait, 2019

Member of Parliament for Stoke-on-Trent South
- In office 8 June 2017 – 30 May 2024
- Preceded by: Rob Flello
- Succeeded by: Allison Gardner

Personal details
- Born: Jack Edgar Brereton; 13 May 1991 (age 35) Stoke-on-Trent, Staffordshire, England
- Party: Conservative
- Spouse: Laura Brereton (m. 2016)
- Education: Keele University; University College London

Jack Edgar Brereton (born 13 May 1991) is a British politician who was the Member of Parliament (MP) for the Stoke-on-Trent South constituency from the 2017 general election until 2024. A member of the Conservative Party, he is a former councillor on Stoke-on-Trent City Council.

== Early life and education ==
Brereton was born in Stoke-on-Trent on 13 May 1991 and grew up in the area. He attended Keele University, graduating with a degree in Politics and International Relations in 2012, and further studied at University College London.

== Career ==
Brereton first stood for a seat at the age of 18 in the 2010 Stoke-on-Trent City Council election on 6 May 2010, where he was defeated in the East Valley ward by the Labour Party candidate Matt Wilcox. One year later, he stood again for the City Council and successfully retained the Baddeley, Milton and Norton ward for the Conservative Party. Following the local election in May 2015, in which he was re-elected as a councillor, he became cabinet member for Regeneration, Heritage and Transport on the City Council as part of a Conservative/Independents ruling coalition. He combined his councillor duties with attending university and, subsequently, with employment as a Parliamentary assistant to Conservative MP for Staffordshire Moorlands Karen Bradley.

== Member of Parliament ==
Brereton unsuccessfully contested Stoke-on-Trent Central in a by-election on 23 February 2017, finishing third. He attracted some negative publicity for a mailshot his campaign released which contained false claims about two local Labour MPs voting against the then Prime Minister Theresa May's Brexit withdrawal agreement and for a poster that misspelled Brexit. After the Government announced that there would be a General Election taking place in June 2017, the Conservative Campaign Headquarters told the local Conservative Association to choose Brereton from a list of one, after he was promoted by his boss, the Cabinet Minister Karen Bradley. This was at the expense of Joe Rich, who had added four per cent to the Conservative Party vote share when he stood in the constituency in the 2015 general election and had hoped to stand again. Brereton went on to defeat the sitting Labour MP Rob Flello and take the seat on 9 June 2017, making him the first Conservative to win in the constituency in over 80 years. Aged 26, he was the youngest Conservative MP in the 2017 intake. In September 2018 he was appointed as the Parliamentary Private Secretary to the Department for Education.

Following his election as MP for Stoke South, Brereton continued with his role on the city council until June 2019 when he did not stand for re-election. He was the Parliamentary Private Secretary to the Department for Exiting the European Union between September 2019 and 31 January 2020. Following the closure of the Department for Exiting the European Union, Brereton was appointed as the Parliamentary Private Secretary to the Secretary of State for Defence.

Brereton resigned his position as Parliamentary Private Secretary to the Secretary of State for International Trade on 7 July 2022 as part of the July 2022 United Kingdom government crisis, one of the last to do so before Boris Johnson announced his resignation as party leader.

Brereton lost his seat during the 2024 general election to Labour challenger Allison Gardner.

=== European Union ===
Brereton is a supporter of Brexit, saying he is "optimistic about our future in leaving the EU". In February 2019 he labelled the behaviour of European Union officials as "threatening and aggressive". He voted against extending negotiations with the EU in March 2019, stating that it was "disrespecting" his constituents.

== Post-parliamentary career ==
After leaving Parliament following his defeat in the 2024 General Election, Brereton was appointed as Head of Regions and Nations Engagement at the National Energy System Operator (NESO).

== Personal life ==
Brereton lives with his wife and children in Stoke-on-Trent, and in London.

Parliament of the United Kingdom
Preceded by Rob Flello	Member of Parliament for Stoke-on-Trent South; 2017–2024	Succeeded by Allison Gardner
