= Allison Gardner =

British politician

Allison Gardner MP
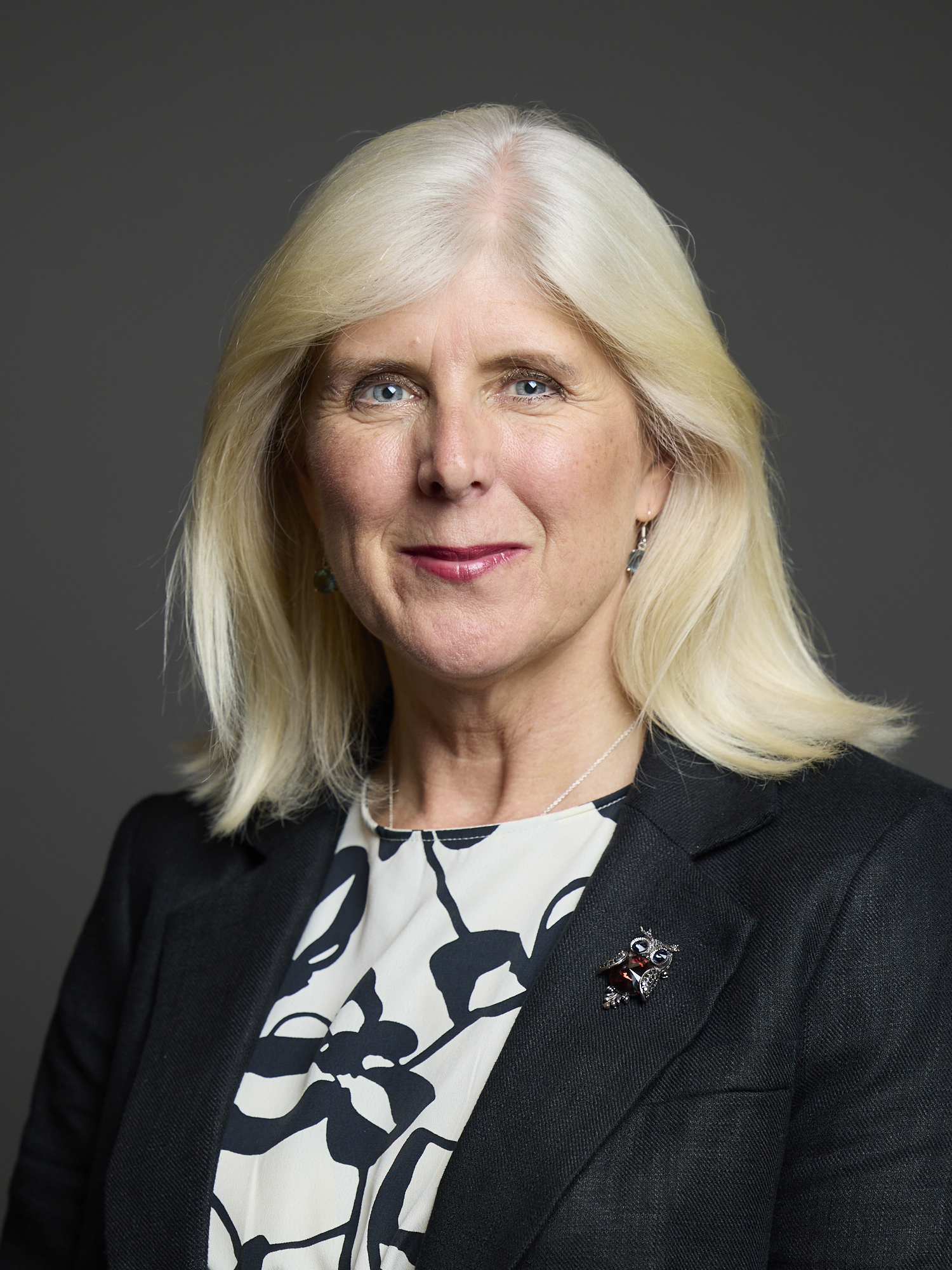
- Official portrait, 2024

Member of Parliament for Stoke-on-Trent South
- Incumbent
- Assumed office 4 July 2024
- Preceded by: Jack Brereton
- Majority: 627 (1.5%)

Personal details
- Born: Allison Clare Elizabeth Gardner c. 1966 (age 59–60)
- Party: Labour
- Education: University of Kent (BSc); Open University (MSc); University of Leeds (PGCE); University of Manchester (PhD)
- Website: allisongardner.co.uk
- Scientific career
- Fields: AI ethics; Data science; Algorithmic bias; Women in computing; Computing education
- Workplaces: National Institute for Health and Care Excellence; University of Keele
- Thesis: Characterising and Predicting Amyloid Mutations in Proteins (2016)
- Doctoral advisor: Andrew Doig; Simon Hubbard

Allison Clare Elizabeth Gardner (born c. 1966) is a British politician. A member of the Labour Party, she has been the Member of Parliament for Stoke-on-Trent South since 2024. She gained the seat from Jack Brereton, a member of the Conservative Party.

== Education ==
Gardnerwas born c. 1966. She was educated at the University of Kent (BSc), the Open University (MSc) and the University of Leeds (PGCE). She completed her PhD in bioinformatics at the University of Manchester in 2016 where her research supervised by Andrew Doig and Simon Hubbard characterised and predicted amyloid mutations in proteins.

== Early career ==
Gardner works with the National Institute for Health and Care Excellence as a senior scientific adviser for artificial intelligence. Previously, she taught science and personal, social, health and economic education (PSHE) in secondary schools; one of her former students, Josh Fenton-Glynn, became a colleague in parliament. She was employed as a lecturer at Keele University where she led the degree apprenticeship programme in data science. She has research interests in the ethics of artificial intelligence, data science, algorithmic bias, women in computing and computing education.

== Political career ==
In the 2024 United Kingdom general election, Gardner was elected Member of Parliament for Stoke-on-Trent South, with a majority of 627 votes.

In Parliament, she is a co-chair of the all-party parliamentary group (APPG) on Urinary Tract Infections. She is an advocate for those affected as a long-term sufferer herself.

== AI regulation and ethics ==
Gardner is a prominent advocate for the ethical development and regulation of artificial intelligence. Prior to her election to Parliament, she co-founded Women Leading in AI and served as its director, advocating internationally for the ethical use of AI, including work with the United Nations. Her academic research has focused on algorithmic bias, gender and computing, and AI governance, and she has contributed to the development of AI standards, including the IEEE P7000 series on the ethics of autonomous and intelligent systems.

In Parliament, Gardner serves as the Co-Chair of the All-Party Parliamentary Group (APPG ) on Artificial Intelligence and is a member of the Science, Innovation and Technology Select Committee. She has argued that regulation does not inhibit technological innovation, stating that "ethical frameworks and good governance" are essential for building public trust and ensuring sustainable economic growth.

In her parliamentary work, she has examined the impact of AI on the creative industries and copyright law. Gardner has strongly opposed proposals to introduce a commercial text and data mining exception with an opt-out model, arguing that allowing generative AI developers free access to copyrighted content without a licence is unfair to creators and risks the long-term success of the AI industry by creating a "reductive spiral into mediocrity" and "model collapse." She has advocated for the retention of the UK's current copyright framework, placing the onus on AI developers to seek licences for the data they use.

Gardner has also campaigned on the issue of deepfakes and the need for AI transparency. During an oral evidence session of the Science, Innovation and Technology Select Committee, she raised the issue of deepfakes with the Secretary of State, asserting that "people should have rights to their own voice and their own image." In a debate on social media misinformation, she questioned the Government on its strategy to improve the labelling of AI-generated content, calling for "new regulatory oversight with clear, enforceable standards and penalties." Furthermore, she has supported the approach of the private member Automated Online Software (Access and Transparency) Bill, which seeks to require operators of bots that systematically access and copy content from UK websites to identify themselves and declare their purpose, arguing that such transparency is a necessary "light-touch approach" to support creators.

Beyond regulation, Gardner has highlighted the potential of AI to address societal challenges. She has spoken on the use of AI to drive a greener future, noting its applications in optimising energy grids and supporting advanced manufacturing, particularly in her constituency of Stoke-on-Trent South. She has also emphasised the importance of addressing health inequalities through AI, while warning against the risk of embedding existing biases into healthcare systems.
