= Penny Summerfield =

English historian

Penelope Summerfield, FBA, FRHistS, FAcSS (born 1951), commonly known as Penny Summerfield, is an English historian and retired academic.

== Early life and education ==
Born in 1951 in London, Summerfield is the daughter of Arthur Summerfield, a professor, and Aline Whalley, a psychologist. She attended the University of Sussex, graduating with a BA in 1973, an MA in 1976 and a DPhil in 1982. Her doctoral studies were supervised by Stephen Yeo.

== Career and honours ==
Summerfield was a research assistant and tutor at Durham University from 1976 to 1978. She then taught at the Lancaster University from 1978, first as a lecturer in the social history of education, and latterly as Professor of Women's History (1994–2000). She moved to the University of Manchester in 2000 to be Professor of Modern History; there, she served as head of the School of History and Classics (2002–2003) and the School of Arts, Histories and Cultures (2003–2006).

In 2020, Summerfield was elected a fellow of the British Academy, the United Kingdom's national academy for the humanities and social sciences. She is also a fellow of the Academy of Social Sciences and the Royal Historical Society, and was the chair of the Social History Society from 2008 to 2011.

== Personal life ==
She was married to the management studies academic and Lancaster University professor Mark Easterby-Smith, with whom she had two children before they divorced; their daughter is the historian Sarah Easterby-Smith. Summerfield later married Oliver Fulton, an emeritus professor of higher education at Lancaster University and the son of the university administrator John Fulton, Baron Fulton.

She is the sister of British psychologist Quentin Summerfield.

== Bibliography ==
=== Books ===
- Summerfield, Penny (1984). Women Workers in the Second World War: Production and Patriarchy in Conflict. London: Croom Helm. ISBN 9780415752640.
- Braybon, Gail; Summerfield, Penny (1987). Out of the Cage: Women's Experiences in Two World Wars. London: Pandora Press. ISBN 9780415752459.
- Summerfield, Penny; Evans, Eric J., eds. (1990). Technical Education and the State since 1850: Historical and Contemporary Perspectives. Manchester: Manchester University Press. ISBN 9780719029677.
- Cosslett, Tess; Easton, Alison; Summerfield, Penny, eds. (1996). Women, Power and Resistance: An Introduction to Women's Studies. Buckingham: Open University Press. ISBN 9780335193912.
- Summerfield, Penny (1997). 'My Dress for an Army Uniform': Gender Instabilities in the Two World Wars: An Inaugural Lecture Delivered at the University of Lancaster on 30 April 1997. Lancaster: University of Lancaster. ISBN 9781862200333.
- Summerfield, Penny (1998). Reconstructing Women's Wartime Lives: Discourse and Subjectivity in Oral Histories of the Second World War. Manchester: Manchester University Press. ISBN 9780719044618.
- Cosslett, Tess; Lury, Celia; Summerfield, Penny, eds. (2000). Feminism and Autobiography: Texts, Theories and Methods. Transformations: Thinking Through Feminism. London: Routledge. ISBN 9780415232029.
- Summerfield, Penny; Peniston-Bird, Corinna (2007). Contesting Home Defence: Men, Women and the Home Guard in the Second World War. Cultural History of Modern War. Manchester: Manchester University Press. ISBN 9780719062025.
- Summerfield, Penny (2019). Histories of the Self: Personal Narratives and Historical Practice. London: Routledge. ISBN 9780415576192.

=== Thesis ===
- Summerfield, Penny (1982). Women Workers in the Second World War: A Study of the Interplay of Official Policy between the Need to Mobilise Women for War and Conventional Expectations about Their Roles at Work and at Home in the Period 1939–45 (PhD). University of Sussex.

=== Peer-reviewed articles and chapters ===
- Summerfield, Penny (1977). "Women Workers in the Second World War". Capital and Class. 1 (1): 27–42. doi:10.1177/030981687700100103. S2CID 220914671.
- Summerfield, Penelope (1981). "The Effingham Arms and the Empire: Deliberate Selection in the Evolution of Music Hall in London". In Yeo, Eileen; Yeo, Stephen (eds.). Popular Culture and Class Conflict, 1590–1914: Explorations in the History of Labour and Leisure. Brighton: Harvester. pp. 209–240. ISBN 9780855271237.
- Summerfield, Penelope (1981). "Education and Politics in the British Armed Forces in the Second World War". International Review of Social History. 26 (2): 133–158. doi:10.1017/S0020859000007112.
- Summerfield, Penelope (1983). "Women, Work and Welfare: A Study of Child Care and Shopping in Britain in the Second World War". Journal of Social History. 17 (2): 249–269. doi:10.1353/jsh/17.2.249.
- Summerfield, Penny (1985). "Mass-Observation: Social Research or Social Movement?". Journal of Contemporary History. 20 (3): 439–452. doi:10.1177/002200948502000306. JSTOR 260353. S2CID 159985443.
- Summerfield, Penelope (1986). "Patriotism and Empire: Music-Hall Entertainment, 1870–1914". In MacKenzie, John M. (ed.). Imperialism and Popular Culture. Manchester: Manchester University Press. pp. 17–48. doi:10.7765/9781526119568.00006. ISBN 9781526119568.
- Summerfield, Penny (1986). "The 'Levelling of Class'". In Smith, Harold L. (ed.). War and Social Change: British Society in the Second World War. Manchester: Manchester Manchester University Press. pp. 179–207.
- Summerfield, Penny (1987). "Cultural Reproduction in the Education of Girls: A Study of Girls' Secondary Schooling in Two Lancashire Towns, 1900–50". In Hunt, Felicity (ed.). Lessons for Life: The Schooling of Girls and Women, 1850–1950. Oxford: Basil Blackwell. pp. 149–170. ISBN 9780631149750.
- Summerfield, Penny (1987). "An Oral History of Schooling in Lancashire, 1900–1950: Gender, Class and Education". Oral History. 15 (2): 19–31. JSTOR 40178956.
- Summerfield, Penny (1988). "Education and the Labour Market". History Workshop Journal. 25 (25): 206–209. doi:10.1093/hwj/25.1.206. JSTOR 4288838.
- Summerfield, Penny (1989). "Women in the Two World Wars". The Historian. 23: 3–8.
- Summerfield, Penny (1989). "What Women Learned from the Second World War". History of Education. 18 (3): 213–229. doi:10.1080/0046760890180303.
- Finch, Janet; Summerfield, Penny (1991). "Social Reconstruction and the Emergence of Companionate Marriage, 1945–59". In Clark, David (ed.). Marriage, Domestic Life and Social Change: Writings for Jacqueline Burgoyne. London: Routledge. pp. 7–32. doi:10.4324/9780203169292-10. ISBN 9780415032469. S2CID 214091645.
- Summerfield, Penny; Crockett, Nicole (1992). "'You Weren't Taught that with the Welding': Lessons in Sexuality in the Second World War". Women's History Review. 1 (3): 435–454. doi:10.1080/09612029200200015.
- Summerfield, Penny (1993). "The Patriarchal Discourse of Human Capital: Training Women for War Work, 1939–1945". Journal of Gender Studies. 2 (2): 189–205. doi:10.1080/09589236.1993.9960538.
- Summerfield, Penny (1993). "Approaches to Women and Social Change in the Second World War". In Brivati, Brian; Jones, Harriet (eds.). What Difference Did the War Make?. Themes in Contemporary British History. London: Leicester University Press. pp. 63–79. ISBN 9780718522636.
- Summerfield, Penny (1995). "Women and War in the Twentieth Century". In Purvis, June (ed.). Women's History: Britain, 1850–1945: An Introduction. London: UCL Press. pp. 307–332. doi:10.4324/9780203930151. ISBN 9780203930151.
- Summerfield, Penny (1996). "The Girl That Makes the Thing That Drills the Hole That Holds the Spring...': Discourses of Women and Work in the Second World War". In Gledhill, Christine; Swanson, Gillian (eds.). Nationalising Femininity: Culture, Sexuality and British Cinema in the Second World War. Manchester: Manchester University Press. pp. 35–52. ISBN 9780719083501.
- Summerfield, Penny (1996). "The Women's Movement in Britain from the 1860s to the 1980s". In Cosslett, Tess; Easton, Alison; Summerfield, Penny (eds.). Women, Power and Resistance: An Introduction to Women's Studies. Buckingham: Open University Press. pp. 227–237. ISBN 9780335193912.
- Summerfield, Penny (1997), "Gender and War in the Twentieth Century", The International History Review, 29 (1): 3–15, doi:10.1080/07075332.1997.9640771
- Summerfield, Penny (1998). "'They Didn't Want Women Back in That Job!': The Second World War and the Construction of Gendered Work Histories". Labour History Review. 63 (1): 83–104. doi:10.3828/lhr.63.1.83.
- Summerfield, Penny (1998). "Research on Women in Britain in the Second World War: An Historiographical Essay" (PDF). Cahiers d'Histoire du Temps Présent. 4: 207–226.
- Summerfield, Penny (2000). "'She Wants a Gun Not a Dishcloth!': Gender, Service and Citizenship in Britain in the Second World War". In DeGroot, Gerard J.; Peniston-Bird, Corinna (eds.). A Soldier and a Woman: Sexual Integration in the Military. Women and Men in History. Harlow: Pearson Education. pp. 119–134. ISBN 9780582414396.
- Summerfield, Penny; Peniston-Bird, Corinna (2000). "Women in the Firing Line: The Home Guard and the Defence of Gender Boundaries in Britain in the Second World War". Women's History Review. 9 (2): 231–254. doi:10.1080/09612020000200250. S2CID 143575935.
- Summerfield, Penny (2000). "Dis/Composing the Subject: Intersubjectivities in Oral History". In Cosslett, Tess; Lury, Celia; Summerfield, Penny (eds.). Feminism and Autobiography: Texts, Theories and Methods. Transformations: Thinking Through Feminism. London: Routledge. pp. 91–106. ISBN 9780415232029.
- Summerfield, Penny (2000). "Hat der Krieg die Britischen Frauen Emanzipiert? Diskurse und Lebensgeschichten uber die Auswirkungen des Kriegs". In Bandhauer-Schöffmann, I.; Duchen, Claire (eds.). Nach dem Krieg: Frauenleben und Geschlechterkonstruktionen in Europa nach dem Zweiten Weltkrieg. Herbolzheim: Centaurus Verlag. pp. 21–44. ISBN 9783825503062.
- Summerfield, Penny (2000). "'It Did Me Good in Lots of Ways': British Women in Transition from War to Peace". In Duchen, Claire; Bandhauer-Schöffmann, Irene (eds.). When the War Was Over: Women, War and Peace in Europe, 1940–1956. London: Leicester University Press. pp. 13–29. ISBN 9781441172709.
- Peniston-Bird, Corinna; Summerfield, Penny (2001). "'Hey, You're Dead!': The Multiple Uses of Humour in Representations of British National Defence in the Second World War". Journal of European Studies. 31 (123): 413–435. doi:10.1177/004724410103112314. PMID 18170944. S2CID 220738559.
- Summerfield, Penny; Peniston-Bird, Corinna M. (2003). "The Home-Guard in Britain in the Second World War: Uncertain Masculinities?". In Higate, Paul R. (ed.). Military Masculinities: Identity and the State. Westport: Praeger Publishers. pp. 57–69. ISBN 9780275975586.
- Summerfield, Penny (2004). "Culture and Composure: Creating Narratives of the Gendered Self in Oral History Interviews". Cultural and Social History. 1 (1): 65–93. doi:10.1191/1478003804cs0005oa. S2CID 146360279.
- Summerfield, Penny (2004). "Popular Memory and Oral History: Issues of Methodology in English Contemporary Historiography". In Frau-Meigs, Divina; Amfreville, Marc (eds.). Introspections, Rétrospections: Sélection des Actes du Colloque de l'Université d'Orléans, 29–30 Septembre 2000. Orleans: Presses Universitaires d'Orleans. pp. 31–40. ISBN 9782913454224.
- Summerfield, Penny (2005). "'Our Amazonian Colleague?: Edith Summerskill's Problematic Reputation". In Toye, R.; Gottlieb, J. (eds.). Making Reputations: Power, Persuasion and the Individual in Modern British Politics. London: I. B. Taurus. pp. 135–150. ISBN 9781850438410.
- Summerfield, Penny (2005). "Oral History as a Research Method". In Griffin, Gabriele (ed.). Research Methods for English Studies (1st ed.). Edinburgh: Edinburgh University Press. pp. 47–66.
- Summerfield, Penny (2007). "War, Film, Memory: Some Reflections on War Films and the Social Configuration of Memory in Britain in the 1940s and 1950s". Journal of War and Culture Studies. 1 (1): 15–23. doi:10.1386/jwcs.1.1.15_0. S2CID 144792047.
- Summerfield, Penny (2007). "Gender and Issues of Integration in Britain, 1939–45". In Linke, Gabrielle; Rossow, Holger (eds.). Rhetoric and Representation: The British at War. Heidelberg: Universitätsverlag Winter. pp. 81–98. ISBN 9783825353902.
- Summerfield, Penny (2008). "Dad's Army, the Home Guard, and the Memory of the British War Effort". In Riera, Monica; Schaffer, Gavin (eds.). The Lasting War: Society and Identity in Britain, France and Germany after 1945. Basingstoke: Palgrave Macmillan. pp. 86–99. ISBN 9780230506718.
- Summerfield, Penny (2009). "Public Memory or Public Amnesia? British Women of the Second World War in Popular Films of the 1950s and 1960s". Journal of British Studies. 48 (4): 935–957. doi:10.1086/603598. JSTOR 27752639. S2CID 145452692.
- Summerfield, Penny (2009). "Film and Popular Memory of the Second World War in Britain, 1950–1959". In Levine, Philippa; Grayzel, Susan R. (eds.). Gender, Labour, War and Empire: Essays on Modern Britain. Basingstoke: Palgrave Macmillan. pp. 157–176. doi:10.1057/9780230582927_9. ISBN 9780230582927.
- Summerfield, Penny (2009). "Gail Braybon 1952–2008: An Appreciation". Women's History Review. 18 (1): 177–178. doi:10.1080/09612020802652916. S2CID 145602860.
- Summerfield, Penny (2010). "Dunkirk and the Popular Memory of Britain at War, 1940–58". Journal of Contemporary History. 45 (4): 788–811. doi:10.1177/0022009410375260. S2CID 159914854.
- Summerfield, Penny (2010). "Conflict, Power and Gender in Women's Memories of the Second World War: A Mass-Observation Study". Miranda: Revue Pluridisciplinaire du Monde Anglophone. 2 (2). doi:10.4000/miranda.1253.
- Summerfield, Penny (2011). "Divisions at Sea: Class, Gender, Race, and Nation in Maritime Films of the Second World War, 1939–60". Twentieth Century British History. 22 (3): 330–353. doi:10.1093/tcbh/hwr001.
- Summerfield, Penny (2013). "Concluding Thoughts: Performance, the Self, and Women's History". Women's History Review. 22 (2): 345–353. doi:10.1080/09612025.2012.726120. S2CID 144564545.
- Summerfield, Penny (2013). "Oral History as a Research Method". In Griffin, Gabriele (ed.). Research Methods for English Studies (2nd ed.). Edinburgh: Edinburgh University Press. pp. 48–68. ISBN 9780748683451.
- Summerfield, Penny (2014). "The Generation of Memory: Gender and the Popular Memory of the Second World War in Britain". In Noakes, Lucy; Pattinson, Juliette (eds.). British Cultural Memory and the Second World War. London: Bloomsbury. pp. 25–46. ISBN 9781441104977.
- Summerfield, Penny (2016). "Oral History as an Autobiographical Practice". Miranda: Revue Pluridisciplinaire du Monde Anglophone. 12 (12). doi:10.4000/miranda.8714.
- Summerfield, Penny (2018). "Introduction to Section 2: Doing Feminist Oral History Then and Now". In Srigley, Katrina; Zembrzycki, Stacey; Iacovetta, Franca (eds.). Beyond Women's Words: Feminisms and the Practices of Oral History in the Twenty-First Century. London: Routledge. pp. 77–81. doi:10.4324/9781351123822. ISBN 9781351123822.
- Summerfield, Penny (2018). "Subjectivity, the Self and Historical Practice". In Handley, Sasha; Mcwilliam, Rohan; Noakes, Lucy (eds.). New Directions in Social and Cultural History. London: Bloomsbury. pp. 21–44. doi:10.5040/9781474204835.ch-001. ISBN 978-1-4742-0483-5.
- Webb, Thomas; Pearson, Chris; Summerfield, Penny; Riley, Mark (2020). "More-Than-Human Emotional Communities: British Soldiers and Mules in Second World War Burma". Cultural and Social History. 17 (2): 245–262. doi:10.1080/14780038.2020.1744879. S2CID 218823112.
- Summerfield, Penny; Stevenson, Kim; Rowbotham, Judith; Jackson, Louise; Abrams, Lynn (2021). "Remembering Shani D'Cruze (1954–2021)". Women's History Review. 30 (3): 351–353. doi:10.1080/09612025.2021.1910199.
- Webb, Thomas; Summerfield, Penny; Riley, Mark; Pearson, Chris (2021). "'We Cows are in a Very Serious Predicament': Constructions of Land Girls and Cattle in Britain in the Second World War". Gender and History. 34: 179–200. doi:10.1111/1468-0424.12524.
