= Jack Ashley, Baron Ashley of Stoke =

British politician

The Right Honourable The Lord Ashley of Stoke CH PC
- Ashley in 2010

Member of the House of Lords
- Lord Temporal
- Life peerage 10 July 1992 – 20 April 2012

Member of Parliament for Stoke-on-Trent South
- In office 31 March 1966 – 16 March 1992
- Preceded by: Ellis Smith
- Succeeded by: George Stevenson

Personal details
- Born: 6 December 1922 Widnes, Lancashire, England
- Died: 20 April 2012 (aged 89) Epsom, Surrey, England
- Party: Labour
- Spouse: Pauline Kay Crispin
- Children: 3; including Jackie
- Education: Ruskin College; Gonville and Caius College, Cambridge

Jack Ashley, Baron Ashley of Stoke (6 December 1922 – 20 April 2012) was a British politician. He was a Labour Member of Parliament in the House of Commons for Stoke-on-Trent South for 26 years, from 1966 to 1992, and subsequently sat in the House of Lords. He was a long-term campaigner for disabled people.

== Early life and education ==
John Ashley was born in Widnes, Lancashire, on 6 December 1922. He left school at 14 to work in the chemical process industry. He became a crane driver and was a shop steward in the Chemical Workers' Union, a union of which he was the youngest executive member aged 22. He served in the British Army in the Second World War, and then won a scholarship to study at Ruskin College, Oxford, where he received a Diploma in Economics and Political Science in 1948.

He continued his studies at Gonville and Caius College, Cambridge, where he was President of the Cambridge Union Society in 1951. He worked as a research worker for the National Union of General and Municipal Workers and then worked as a radio producer for the North American Service and BBC Home Service. In 1956 he joined the BBC television service and worked as a producer on Panorama and Monitor.

== Member of Parliament ==
He served on Widnes Borough Council as a councillor from 1946. At the 1951 general election, Ashley contested Finchley without success. He was elected as Member of Parliament (MP) for Stoke-on-Trent South at the 1966 general election. In December 1967, at the age of 45, as a result of complications of a routine ear operation to correct a mild hearing loss caused by a perforated eardrum early in his working career, he became profoundly deaf, developing tinnitus. He described the event as "rather like being struck by lightning". He initially thought that he should resign his seat, but instead undertook a course in lip-reading. He returned to the House of Commons, the United Kingdom's first totally deaf MP, reportedly a world first for an elected assembly. Later, he used a palantype transcription system developed by Alan Newell, Andrew Downton and others at the University of Southampton – this allowed a palantype secretary seated in the public gallery to type what was being said in real time and Ashley could read the transcribed English text from a discreetly-placed monitor at his seat.

The first known use of the term "domestic violence" in a modern context, meaning violence in the home, was by Ashley in an address to Parliament in 1973 in which he noted the pioneering work of campaigner Erin Pizzey, founder of the first domestic violence shelter. The term previously referred primarily to civil unrest, violence from within a country as opposed to violence perpetrated by a foreign power. (Note: Compare the 18 July 1877 request for help sent to President of the United States Rutherford B. Hayes by West Virginia governor Henry M. Mathews following the outbreak of strikes and riots: "Owing to unlawful combinations and domestic violence now existing at Martinsburg and other points along the line of the Baltimore & Ohio Railroad, it is impossible with any force at my command to execute the laws of the State.")

== Disability campaigner ==
He became a tireless campaigner for disabled people, especially those who were deaf or blind, and won broad cross-party sympathy, support and respect in parliament for his approach. In 1972, he sponsored the pivotal motion in the House of Commons making a distinction between legal and moral obligation. The success of this enabled The Sunday Times to continue its moral campaign for improved compensation for children disabled by thalidomide even while the parents' legal case was still technically in the courts. His Labour colleague Alf Morris (later Lord Morris of Manchester) was also a supporter. The editor of The Sunday Times, Harold Evans, later wrote in Good Times, Bad Times how Ashley selflessly gave up writing his autobiography so as to concentrate on the thalidomide campaign. He also campaigned for compensation for vaccine damage and for damage caused by the arthritis drug Opren. He became a Member of the Order of the Companions of Honour in the 1975 New Year Honours, and joined the Privy Council in 1979.

He also received a Doctor of Humane Letters from the Gallaudet University, the world's only university for the deaf, in 1975 for his efforts on behalf of deaf and hard-of-hearing persons.

Ashley's ability to follow the proceedings of the House of Commons helped inspire the development of live captioning on television to benefit the deaf and hard-of-hearing. He had the ability to read the output from the stenographers who were reporting the debates. When Ashley visited the BBC's Ceefax department around 1975, this ability gave one of the staff the idea of commissioning a Southampton University doctoral student to develop a computer programme that would convert stenographic output to normal printed text as subtitles to television programmes. Later, Ashley also used the technique to follow parliamentary debates on a small monitor .

Ashley received an Honorary Doctorate from Heriot-Watt University in 1979.

In 1986, Ashley and his wife founded the charity Defeating Deafness, now known as Deafness Research UK. He retired from the House of Commons at the 1992 general election and was created a life peer as Baron Ashley of Stoke, of Widnes in the County of Cheshire on 10 July 1992.

He received a cochlear implant in 1993 which restored much of his hearing. In 1996, he founded the Graham Fraser foundation in memory of Graham Fraser, the procedure's pioneer in the United Kingdom, in order to fund hearing loss research.

He was the subject of This Is Your Life in October 1974 when he was surprised by Eamonn Andrews while playing badminton in the back garden of his home in Epsom.

== Personal life ==
Ashley married Pauline Kay Crispin (1932–2003) in 1951; she died aged 70 in Surrey. They had three daughters, including journalist Jackie Ashley. His son-in-law was television presenter Andrew Marr through Marr's marriage to Jackie.

Ashley contracted pneumonia, and died at Epsom Hospital in Surrey on 20 April 2012, at the age of 89.

== Notes ==
Parliament of the United Kingdom
Preceded by Ellis Smith	Member of Parliament for Stoke-on-Trent South; 1966–1992	Succeeded by George Stevenson
