= John Watts (Stoke politician) =

John Watts (1864 – April 1951) was a British political activist.

Watts was educated at Audley Grammar School. He initially worked as a coal miner, but later retrained as a mining engineer. In 1895, Watts was working at the Diglake Colliery when it flooded. He ran to warn other miners of the impending danger and played a prominent role in the rescue efforts, repeatedly descending into freezing water, and was as a result awarded the silver medal of the Royal Humane Society. He later moved to work at the Mansfield Colliery in Longton, followed by work for the Stafford Iron and Coal Company.

Watts became an active trade unionist, and at the 1918 United Kingdom general election, he was selected as the Labour Party's Prospective Parliamentary Candidate for Stoke. However, the local North Staffordshire Miners' Federation decided not to sponsor him, so he was forced to withdraw due to a lack of funds.

At the 1922 United Kingdom general election, Watts did stand in Stoke, with sponsorship from the Miners' Federation of Great Britain. He secured 38.7% of the vote and second place, increasing this to 48.8% in the 1923 United Kingdom general election, but falling back to 42.7% in the 1924 United Kingdom general election. By this point, he was working as a colliery manager and living in Stoke.
