= Rob Flello =

British Liberal Democrat politician

Member of Parliament for Stoke-on-Trent South
- In office 5 May 2005 – 5 May 2017
- Preceded by: George Stevenson
- Succeeded by: Jack Brereton

Personal details
- Born: Robert Charles Douglas Flello; 14 January 1966 (age 60) Birmingham, England
- Education: University of Wales, Bangor

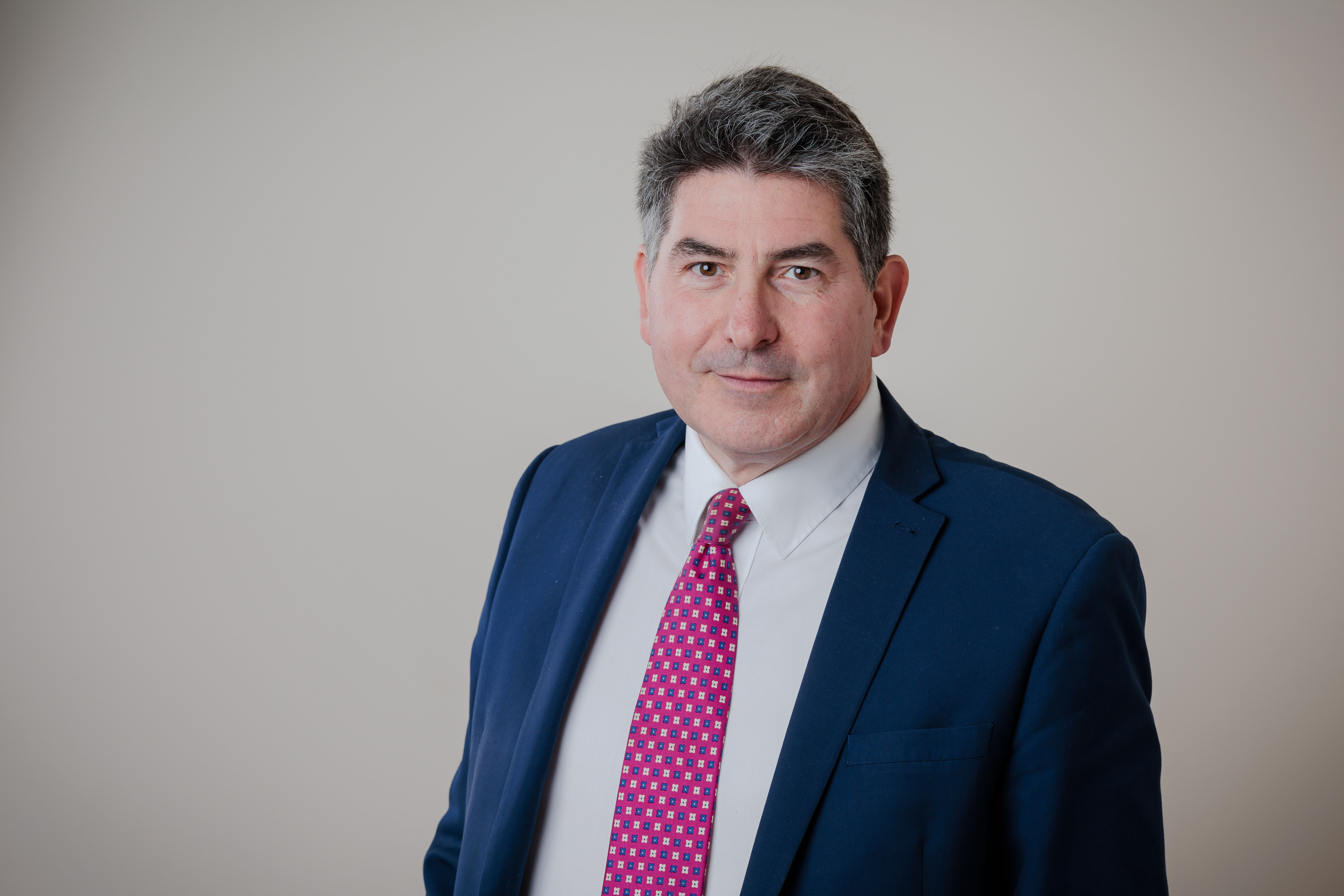

Robert Charles Douglas Flello (born 14 January 1966) is Chief Executive Officer of national trade body, Ceramics UK. He served as Labour Member of Parliament (MP) for Stoke-on-Trent South from 2005 to 2017.

== Early life ==
Flello was born in Bournville, Birmingham. He attended Bournville Junior and Infant schools before going to King's Norton Boys' School. At age 18 he went to University of Wales, Bangor, to read Chemistry. He graduated in 1987 with a BSc (Hons).

== Career ==
In January 2022, Rob Flello was announced as the new Chief Executive of the British Ceramic Confederation (BCC), now known as Ceramics UK.

Ceramics UK (C-UK) is the trade association for the UK ceramic manufacturing industry, representing the common and collective interests of all sectors of the industry. Its 90+ member companies cover the full spectrum of ceramic products and comprise over 90% of the industry’s manufacturing capacity. Membership includes manufacturers from the following industry sectors:

· Gift and Tableware	· Floor and Wall Tiles	· Sanitaryware
· Bricks	· Clay Roof Tiles	· Clay Pipes
· Refractories	· Industrial Ceramics	· Material Suppliers

Flello was instrumental in securing a £120m package of government funding to support the UK ceramics sector, announced in May 2026. The funding allocated £60m for capital investment to support energy efficiency and long-term sustainability, and £60m to cover operational costs.

Flello told the BBC that the package had been ‘long fought for’ and had taken a lot of lobbying to secure.

He added that Ceramics UK had been asked to work with civil servants on the design and implementation of the scheme and that the money would “support thousands of jobs and put businesses on a secure footing for the long term.”

In March 2026, Flello championed the International Day of Ceramics as an opportunity to showcase the importance of the sector and showcase the use of ceramics and ceramic components in all aspects of daily life, from plates and cups to mobile phones, wall tiles and the manufacture of steel and glass.

Ceramics UK joined forces with The AMRICC Centre to set out the sector’s position as an indispensable part of the UK economy, exploring themes of ‘hidden in plain sight’ and ‘critical enabler’ to mark the day. Activities included a technical tour of the £10.3 million flagship advanced ceramics site, The AMRICC Centre, as well as industry spotlight presentations, political insight and the launch of a national competition for schools. From June 2025, Flello led a campaign for the ceramics sector to be included in the Government’s British Industry Supercharger scheme, which excluded 90% of ceramics manufacturers due to the restrictive rules of the scheme. The relief applied only to electricity-intensive industries, while most ceramics producers rely on gas.

In June 2024, he successfully managed the merger of Ceramics UK with the Brick Development Association.

Flello oversaw the rebranding of the BCC, which was relaunched as Ceramics UK in December 2023, at an event in parliament which hosted industry leaders, MPs, ministers and government department representatives and featured displays from Doulton, Mantec and Ideal Standard. Attendees were presented with celebratory brick slips which had been specially designed for the launch by Ketley Brick.

In March 2023 Flello was asked to sit on the Board of the Construction products Association and joined the Advisory Board for the Advanced Ceramics Show and the Advanced Materials Show.

Flello’s early career started with the Inland Revenue after graduation. He moved on to Price Waterhouse accountants and then Arthur Andersen accountants before setting up a tax and finance business with a colleague, which was later sold to a private bank.

He has served as a governor at the Newman College (Now Birmingham Newman University) in Bartley Green, and was Chair of Governors for both Colmers Farm infants and junior schools. He was also a governor at The Meadows Primary School. From 2018 to 2026, he served as Chair of Governors at St. Thomas More Catholic Academy, Longton.

Flello was elected as a Birmingham city councillor and became an MP from 2002 to 2017 then worked as a consultant for charities and businesses before his appointment as Chief Executive of Ceramics UK.

== Political career ==
Flello was elected to the House of Commons at the 2005 general election for Stoke-on-Trent South following the retirement of George Stevenson. Flello held the seat with a majority of 8,618 and made his maiden speech on 19 May 2005 at 3.07pm.

In parliament, Flello was Shadow Minister (Justice) from October 2010 to October 2013.

He also Chaired the All-Party Parliamentary Freight Transport Group, All-Party Childhood and Adult Obesity Group and British-Spain Parliamentary Group, as well as chairing parliamentary debates and public bill committees as a member of the House of Commons’ Speaker’s Panel.

Flello was Parliamentary Private Secretary to three cabinet members - the Secretary of State for Defence, Secretary of State for Communities & Local Government/ Cabinet Office and to the Lord Chancellor/ Constitutional Affairs/ Ministry of Justice.

He was the parliamentary representative of the Financial Reporting Advisory Board, a member of the Transport Select Committee and the Science and Technology Select Committee, a Fellow of the Industry and Parliament Trust, part of the Armed Forces Parliamentary Scheme, member of the Parliamentary Norway Group, co-Chair of the Parliamentary British-Italian Group and Chair of the Parliamentary Friends of Colombia Group.

He also founded the All-Party Dog Welfare Group, the Paternal Post-natal Mental Health Working Group, the Munitions Workers Memorial Campaign and was Convenor of the Catholic Legislators Network.

Flello has widely been quoted on his Catholic beliefs after saying: “I could no more leave my faith at the door of the House of Commons than I could my name or my gender or my arms and legs.”

Flello gave his support to Andy Burnham’s leadership bid in 2009 and supported Owen Smith in the 2016 Labour leadership election. He publicly opposed Jeremy Corbyn, calling for him to resign and refusing to join his shadow defence team.

In 2017, Flello said during a Transport Committee inquiry into urban traffic congestion: “Surely if traffic is being slowed down because some of the available tarmac is being removed and put to other purposes, or some of the tarmac is not available because of roadworks or because it has been blocked off while some work is being done on pavements—whatever it might be—surely one of the answers is to reinstate some of the tarmac that has been removed.

"It speeds up the traffic and perhaps does more for air pollution in places such as London than getting people on to pushbikes."

The comments received a critical response from bike charity the London Cycling Campaign and cycling website road.cc.

Flello lost his seat in the 2017 General Election but stood again in 2019 after joining the Liberal Democrats and being selected as their candidate for his former constituency, Stoke-on-Trent South. He was deselected 36 hours after announcing his candidacy. The party cited ‘diverging values’ as the reason for the decision, despite Flello successfully completing a rigorous selection process.

Flello’s case was used to support legal action by former BBC journalist David Campanale, who sued the Lib Dems, successfully proving he had been deselected because he is a practising Christian.

Reflecting on his parliamentary career, Flello said: “I felt I had something to say and thought I could make a difference by being a Member of Parliament. I like to think I did make some positive changes, maybe on a small scale compared to the world, but quite significant ones for many of my constituents.”

Parliament of the United Kingdom
Preceded by George Stevenson	Member of Parliament for Stoke-on-Trent South; 2005–2017	Succeeded by Jack Brereton
