= Deafness Research UK =

British medical research charity

Deafness Research UK (The Hearing Research Trust) was one of the leading national British medical research charity working in the field of deafness. Its main activities are medical research and education.

It was founded as Defeating Deafness in 1985 by the late British Member of Parliament Jack Ashley and his wife Pauline.

It became part of the charity Action on Hearing Loss in 2013.
