= Stoke-on-Trent South =

Parliamentary constituency in the United Kingdom, 1950 onwards

Coordinates: 52.95°N 2.11°W

- County constituency for the House of Commons
- Boundaries since 2024
- Boundary of Stoke-on-Trent South in West Midlands region
- County: Staffordshire
- Electorate: 68,624 (December 2010)
- Major settlements: Stoke-on-Trent (part), Longton, Forsbrook, Barlaston

Current constituency
- Created: 1950
- Member of Parliament: Allison Gardner (Labour)
- Seats: One
- Created from: Stoke-on-Trent, Stoke

Stoke-on-Trent South is a constituency (Note: A borough constituency (for the purposes of election expenses and type of returning officer)) created in 1950, and represented in the House of Commons of the UK Parliament since 2024 by Allison Gardner, a Labour party representative. (Note: As with all constituencies, the constituency elects one Member of Parliament (MP) by the first past the post system of election at least every five years.)

== Constituency profile ==
The A50 through Meir

Stoke-on-Trent South is a constituency in Staffordshire in the West Midlands region of England. It covers the southern areas of the city of Stoke-on-Trent, including Meir, Weston Coyney, Trentham, Hem Heath and the southern half of Longton. It also covers a rural area south of the city, including the villages of Blythe Bridge, Forsbrook and Tean.

Stoke-on-Trent is a polycentric city that was formed in 1910 from the amalgamation of six towns. The Stoke-on-Trent area is commonly referred to as the Potteries, reflecting its traditional status as the country's foremost centre for the production of ceramics. Coal mining and steelmaking were also important industries in the city. Longton was an industrial town and the decline of the pottery sector has left it highly-deprived. Meir also has low levels of wealth with many residents living in socially-rented, semi-detached properties. In comparison, Trentham and Blythe Bridge are affluent and suburban in character. House prices across the constituency are generally lower than the regional and UK averages.

Stoke-on-Trent South has a large retired population and below-average proportions of young and middle-aged adults. Residents have average rates of income and high levels of homeownership, but the child poverty rate is above-average. They have low levels of education and a high proportion work in the retail, health and transport sectors. The percentage of residents claiming unemployment benefits is low. White people made up 90% of the population at the 2021 census.

Most of this constituency is represented by Conservatives at the local council level, with some Labour Party councillors elected in Longton. Voters in Stoke-on-Trent South strongly supported leaving the European Union in the 2016 referendum; an estimated 64% voted in favour of Brexit compared to the UK-wide figure of 52%.

== Boundaries ==
=== Historic ===
1950–1955: The County Borough of Stoke-on-Trent wards numbers 19 to 26.

1955–1983: The County Borough of Stoke-on-Trent wards numbers 17, 18, 19, 20, 21, 22, 23, and 24.

1983–2010: The City of Stoke-on-Trent wards of Blurton, Fenton Green, Great Fenton, Longton South, Meir Park, Trentham Park, and Weston.

2010–2024: The City of Stoke-on-Trent wards of Blurton, Fenton, Longton North, Longton South, Meir Park and Sandon, Trentham and Hanford, and Weston and Meir North.

=== Current ===
Under the 2023 Periodic Review of Westminster constituencies which came into effect for the 2024 general election, the constituency was defined as composing the following as they existed on 1 December 2020:

- The Borough of Stafford wards of: Barlaston; Fulford; Swynnerton & Oulton.
- The District of Staffordshire Moorlands wards of: Checkley; Forsbrook.
- The City of Stoke-on-Trent wards of: Blurton East; Blurton West and Newstead; Broadway and Longton East; Dresden and Florence; Hanford and Trentham; Hollybush and Longton West; Lightwood North and Normacot; Meir North; Meir Park; Meir South; Weston Coyney.

Significant changes, with northern parts, including the town of Fenton, being transferred to Stoke-on-Trent Central. To compensate and bring the electorate within the permitted range, the parts in the Stafford and Staffordshire Moorlands local authorities were added from the abolished constituency of Stone.

Following a further local government boundary review in the City of Stoke-on-Trent which came into effect in May 2023, the constituency now comprises the following from the 2024 general election:

- The Borough of Stafford wards of: Barlaston; Fulford; Swynnerton & Oulton.
- The District of Staffordshire Moorlands wards of: Checkley; Forsbrook.
- The City of Stoke-on-Trent wards of: Blurton; Dresden & Florence; Hanford, Newstead & Trentham; Hollybush; Lightwood North & Normacot; Longton & Meir Hay South (nearly all); Meir Hay North, Parkhall & Weston Coney (majority); Meir North; Meir Park; Meir South.

== History ==
=== Political history ===
The constituency was created for the 1950 general election as the successor to the Stoke Division of Stoke-on-Trent. It also included parts of the abolished Stone constituency which had been absorbed by the County Borough of Stoke-on-Trent.

The constituency and its predecessor were safe Labour seats from 1935 until the 2010s when it became marginal. It was won by the Conservative Party for the first time in 2017 when Jack Brereton became its MP. At the 2019 general election, the Conservatives increased their majority to over 11,000 votes; with a vote share of 62%. This was overturned in the 2024 election when, despite boundary changes favorable to the Conservatives, Labour's Allison Gardner won the seat, albeit with a small majority of 627 votes.

=== Prominent members ===
Jack Ashley (later Lord Ashley) became deaf as a result of an operation, but his disability campaigns led to major enactments and public sector changes to improve ordinary life for deaf people, including the inclusion of sign language in television programmes and campaigns to help other disabled people.

== Members of Parliament ==
Stoke-on-Trent/"Stoke" prior to 1950

Election	Member	Party
1950	Ellis Smith	Labour
1966	Jack Ashley	Labour
1992	George Stevenson	Labour
2005	Rob Flello	Labour
2017	Jack Brereton	Conservative
2024	Allison Gardner	Labour

== Elections ==
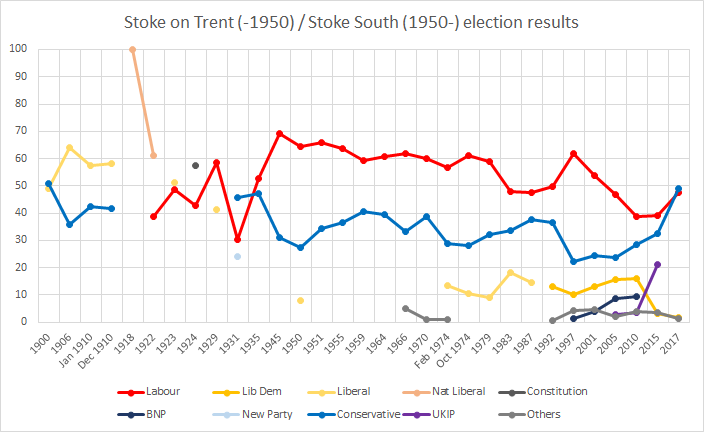
Stoke South election results

=== Elections in the 2020s ===
General election 2024: Stoke-on-Trent South
Party	Candidate	Votes	%	±%
Labour	Allison Gardner	14,221	34.7	+5.1
Conservative	Jack Brereton	13,594	33.2	−29.3
Reform	Michael Bailey	8,851	21.6	N/A
Liberal Democrats	Alec Sandiford	1,577	3.9	−2.3
Independent	Asif Mehmood	1,372	3.4	N/A
Green	Peggy Wiseman	1,207	2.9	+1.3
Independent	Carla Parrish	120	0.3	N/A
Majority		627	1.5	N/A
Turnout		40,942	59.7	−1.7
Labour gain from Conservative		Swing	+15.0	

=== Elections in the 2010s ===
General election 2019: Stoke-on-Trent South
Party	Candidate	Votes	%	±%
Conservative	Jack Brereton	24,632	62.2	+13.1
Labour	Mark McDonald	13,361	33.7	–13.8
Liberal Democrats	Rosalyn Gordon	1,611	4.1	+2.2
Majority		11,271	28.5	+26.9
Turnout		39,604	61.4	–1.7
Conservative hold		Swing	+13.4	

General election 2017: Stoke-on-Trent South
Party	Candidate	Votes	%	±%
Conservative	Jack Brereton	20,451	49.1	+16.4
Labour	Rob Flello	19,788	47.5	+8.3
Liberal Democrats	Ian Wilkes	808	1.9	–1.4
Green	Jan Zablocki	643	1.5	–1.1
Majority		663	1.6	N/A
Turnout		41,690	63.1	+5.8
Conservative gain from Labour		Swing	+4.1	

General election 2015: Stoke-on-Trent South
Party	Candidate	Votes	%	±%
Labour	Rob Flello	15,319	39.2	+0.4
Conservative	Joe Rich	12,780	32.7	+4.3
UKIP	Tariq Mahmood	8,298	21.2	+17.8
Liberal Democrats	Peter Andras	1,309	3.3	–12.6
Green	Luke Bellamy	1,029	2.6	New
TUSC	Matthew Wright	372	1.0	New
Majority		2,539	6.5	–3.9
Turnout		39,107	57.3	–1.5
Labour hold		Swing	–2.0	

General election 2010: Stoke-on-Trent South
Party	Candidate	Votes	%	±%
Labour	Rob Flello	15,446	38.8	–8.1
Conservative	James Rushton	11,316	28.4	+4.2
Liberal Democrats	Zulfiqar Ali	6,323	15.9	+0.8
BNP	Michael Coleman	3,762	9.4	+0.4
UKIP	Mark Barlow	1,363	3.4	+0.7
Staffordshire Independent Group	Terry Follows	1,208	3.0	New
Independent	Mark Breeze	434	1.1	New
Majority		4,130	10.4	–12.6
Turnout		39,852	58.8	+4.4
Labour hold		Swing	–6.2	

=== Elections in the 2000s ===
General election 2005: Stoke-on-Trent South
Party	Candidate	Votes	%	±%
Labour	Rob Flello	17,727	46.9	–6.9
Conservative	Mark Deaville	9,046	23.9	–0.7
Liberal Democrats	Andrew Martin	5,894	15.6	+2.5
BNP	Mark Leat	3,305	8.7	+4.9
UKIP	Neville Benson	1,043	2.8	New
Veritas	Grant Allen	805	2.1	New
Majority		8,618	23.0	–6.2
Turnout		37,820	53.6	+2.2
Labour hold		Swing	–3.1	

General election 2001: Stoke-on-Trent South
Party	Candidate	Votes	%	±%
Labour	George Stevenson	19,366	53.8	–8.2
Conservative	Philip Bastiman	8,877	24.6	+2.2
Liberal Democrats	Christopher Coleman	4,724	13.1	+2.9
Independent	Adrian Knapper	1,703	4.7	New
BNP	Steven Batkin	1,358	3.8	+2.6
Majority		10,489	29.2	–10.4
Turnout		36,028	51.4	–14.7
Labour hold		Swing	–5.2	

=== Elections in the 1990s ===
General election 1997: Stoke-on-Trent South
Party	Candidate	Votes	%	±%
Labour	George Stevenson	28,645	62.0	+12.2
Conservative	Sheila Scott	10,342	22.4	–14.3
Liberal Democrats	Peter Barnett	4,710	10.2	+2.8
Referendum	Richard Adams	1,103	2.4	New
Liberal	Alison Micklem	580	1.3	New
BNP	Steven Batkin	568	1.2	New
National Democrats	Brian Lawrence	288	0.6	New
Majority		18,303	39.6	+26.5
Turnout		46,236	66.1	–8.2
Labour hold		Swing	+13.3	

General election 1992: Stoke-on-Trent South
Party	Candidate	Votes	%	±%
Labour	George Stevenson	26,380	49.8	+2.3
Conservative	Roger Ibbs	19,471	36.7	–1.1
Liberal Democrats	Fred Jones	6,870	13.0	–1.7
Natural Law	Elizabeth Lines	291	0.5	New
Majority		6,909	13.1	+3.4
Turnout		53,012	74.3	+0.6
Labour hold		Swing	+1.7	

=== Elections of the 1980s ===
General election 1987: Stoke-on-Trent South
Party	Candidate	Votes	%	±%
Labour	Jack Ashley	24,794	47.5	
Conservative	Dennis Hartshorne	19,741	37.8	
Liberal	Peter Wild	7,669	14.69	
Majority		5,053	9.68	
Turnout		52,204	73.73	
Labour hold		Swing		

General election 1983: Stoke-on-Trent South
Party	Candidate	Votes	%	±%
Labour	Jack Ashley	23,611	48.0	−10.8
Conservative	Peter Maxwell	16,506	33.6	+1.3
Liberal	William Walley	9,050	18.4	+9.4
Majority		7,105	14.4	−12.1
Turnout		49,167	69.6	−2.9
Labour hold		Swing	-6.0	

=== Elections of the 1970s ===
General election 1979: Stoke-on-Trent South
Party	Candidate	Votes	%	±%
Labour	Jack Ashley	31,610	58.75	
Conservative	R Rayner	17,364	32.27	
Liberal	D Chantrey	4,829	8.98	
Majority		14,246	26.48	
Turnout		53,803	72.52	
Labour hold		Swing		

General election October 1974: Stoke-on-Trent South
Party	Candidate	Votes	%	±%
Labour	Jack Ashley	30,699	61.18	
Conservative	S Heath	14,204	28.31	
Liberal	E Johnson	5,278	10.52	
Majority		16,495	32.87	
Turnout		50,181	69.09	
Labour hold		Swing		

General election February 1974: Stoke-on-Trent South
Party	Candidate	Votes	%	±%
Labour	Jack Ashley	31,650	56.83	
Conservative	S Newall	15,981	28.70	
Liberal	M Smith	7,578	13.61	New
Communist	S Lomas	481	0.86	
Majority		15,669	28.13	
Turnout		55,690	77.38	
Labour hold		Swing		

General election 1970: Stoke-on-Trent South
Party	Candidate	Votes	%	±%
Labour	Jack Ashley	20,770	60.24	
Conservative	RJ Apps	13,344	38.70	
Communist	SJ Lomas	364	1.06	
Majority		7,426	21.54	
Turnout		34,478	50.66	
Labour hold		Swing		

=== Elections of the 1960s ===
General election 1966: Stoke-on-Trent South
Party	Candidate	Votes	%	±%
Labour	Jack Ashley	27,380	61.65	
Conservative	FW Thornton	14,769	33.26	
Communist	SJ Lomas	2,262	5.09	New
Majority		12,611	28.39	
Turnout		44,411	71.02	
Labour hold		Swing		

General election 1964: Stoke-on-Trent South
Party	Candidate	Votes	%	±%
Labour	Ellis Smith	28,928	60.56	
Conservative	Clive Howson	18,839	39.44	
Majority		10,089	21.12	
Turnout		47,767	75.65	
Labour hold		Swing		

=== Elections of the 1950s ===
General election 1959: Stoke-on-Trent South
Party	Candidate	Votes	%	±%
Labour	Ellis Smith	29,578	59.28	
Conservative	Geoffrey S Tucker	20,318	40.72	
Majority		9,260	18.56	
Turnout		49,896	78.24	
Labour hold		Swing		

General election 1955: Stoke-on-Trent South
Party	Candidate	Votes	%	±%
Labour	Ellis Smith	31,003	63.61	
Conservative	Basil GC Webb	17,739	36.39	
Majority		13,264	27.22	
Turnout		48,742	73.62	
Labour hold		Swing		

General election 1951: Stoke-on-Trent South
Party	Candidate	Votes	%	±%
Labour	Ellis Smith	35,261	65.77	
Conservative	Basil Webb	18,355	34.23	
Majority		16,906	31.54	
Turnout		53,616	84.21	
Labour hold		Swing		

General election 1950: Stoke-on-Trent South
Party	Candidate	Votes	%
Labour	Ellis Smith	34,339	64.45
Conservative	L Orridge	14,637	27.47
Liberal	William Herbert Kemp	4,307	8.08
Majority		19,702	36.98
Turnout		53,283	85.27
Labour win (new seat)			

== See also ==
- List of parliamentary constituencies in Staffordshire
- List of parliamentary constituencies in West Midlands (region)
