= Ellis Smith =

British politician (1896–1969)

Ellis Smith (4 November 1896 – 7 November 1969) was a British Labour Party politician. He was elected at the 1935 general election as Member of Parliament (MP) for Stoke and served as Parliamentary Secretary to the Board of Trade from 1945 to 1946. He was elected the first MP for the new Stoke-on-Trent South constituency when the seat was created in 1950, and served until his retirement in 1966. His successor was Jack Ashley.

Parliament of the United Kingdom
| Preceded by Ida Copeland | Member of Parliament for Stoke; 1935–1950 | Constituency abolished |
| New constituency | Member of Parliament for Stoke-on-Trent South; 1950–1966 | Succeeded by Jack Ashley |
Trade union offices
| Preceded by George Buchanan | President of the United Patternmakers' Association; 1946–1966 | Succeeded by Victor MacDonald |
