= Marriage (Same Sex Couples) Act 2013 =

United Kingdom legislation legalizing same-sex marriage

Marriage (Same Sex Couples) Act 2013 (Note: Section 21(1).)
- Act of Parliament
- Parliament of the United Kingdom
- Long title: An Act to make provision for the marriage of same sex couples in England and Wales, about gender change by married persons and civil partners, about consular functions in relation to marriage, for the marriage of armed forces personnel overseas, for permitting marriages according to the usages of belief organisations to be solemnized on the authority of certificates of a superintendent registrar, for the review of civil partnership, for the review of survivor benefits under occupational pension schemes, and for connected purposes.
- Citation: 2013 c. 30
- Introduced by: Maria Miller, Secretary of State for Culture, Media and Sport and Minister for Women and Equalities (Commons); Baroness Stowell of Beeston, Baroness-in-Waiting (Lords)
- Territorial extent: England and Wales; Scotland (in part); Northern Ireland (in part); (Note: Section 20.)

Dates
- Royal assent: 17 July 2013
- Commencement: Between 17 July 2013 and 10 December 2014 (Note: Section 21(2)–(3).)
Other legislation
Amends	Marriage Act 1949; Marriage (Registrar General's Licence) Act 1970; Matrimonial Causes Act 1973; Domicile and Matrimonial Proceedings Act 1973; Public Order Act 1986; Social Security Contributions and Benefits Act 1992; Pension Schemes Act 1993; Gender Recognition Act 2004; Civil Partnership Act 2004; Constitutional Reform Act 2005; Human Fertilisation and Embryology Act 2008; Equality Act 2010
Repeals/revokes	Foreign Marriage Act 1892 (in England, Wales and Scotland)
Amended by	Pensions Act 2014; Deregulation Act 2015; Immigration Act 2016; Civil Partnership (Opposite-sex Couples) Regulations 2019; Marriage (Same-sex Couples) and Civil Partnership (Opposite-sex Couples) (Northern Ireland) Regulations 2019; Marriage and Civil Partnership (Northern Ireland) Regulations 2020; Registration of Marriages Regulations 2021; Pension Schemes (Conversion of Guaranteed Minimum Pensions) Act 2022
Relates to	Marriage and Civil Partnership (Scotland) Act 2014; Marriage (Same Sex Couples) Act 2013 (Consequential and Contrary Provisions and Scotland) Order 2014; Civil Partnerships, Marriages and Deaths (Registration etc) Act 2019; Marriage and Civil Partnership (Northern Ireland) Regulations 2020

Status: Amended

History of passage through Parliament

Text of statute as originally enacted

Revised text of statute as amended

The Marriage (Same Sex Couples) Act 2013 (c. 30) is an act of the Parliament of the United Kingdom which introduced same-sex marriage in England and Wales.

== Background ==
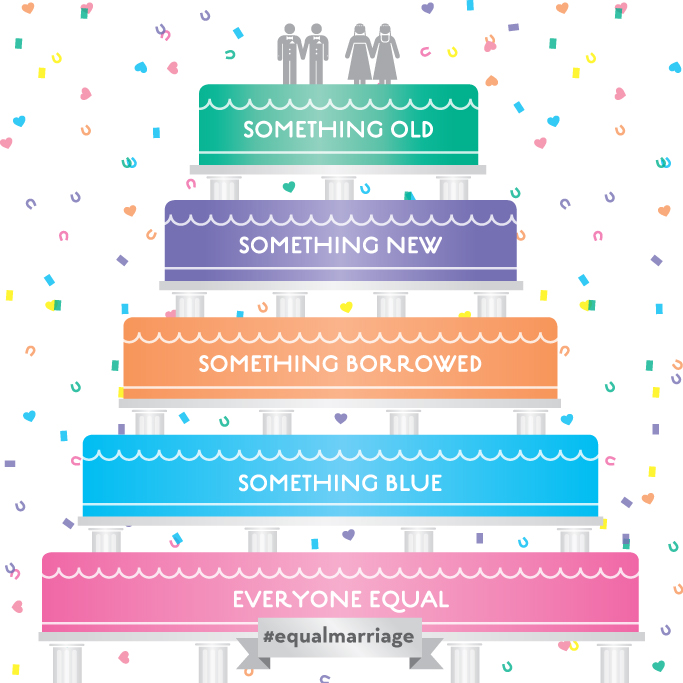
The Government's equal marriage promotion

Civil partnerships were introduced in the United Kingdom in 2004, allowing same-sex couples and couples of whom one spouse had changed gender to live in legally-recognised intimate partnerships similar to marriage. It also compelled opposite-sex couples to end their marriage if one or both spouses underwent gender change surgery, or if the couple was not recognised in law as having male and female gender.

Following the 2010 general election, in September 2011, Liberal Democrat Minister for Equalities Lynne Featherstone launched a consultation in March 2012 on how to introduce civil marriage for same sex couples in England and Wales. The consultation closed in June 2012 and, in December 2012, the new Minister for Women and Equalities, Maria Miller, stated that the Government would be introducing legislation "within the lifetime of this Parliament" and that they were "working towards this happening within this Parliamentary Session". The Marriage (Same Sex Couples) Bill was introduced into Parliament on 24 January 2013. The leaders of the three main political parties in the United Kingdom gave their members a free vote in Parliament on the legislation, meaning they would not be whipped to vote for or against it.

The bill was welcomed by many, including the gay rights campaigning group Stonewall. The organisation Labour Humanists said there was "no credible ethical reason" to oppose gay marriage and Minister for Women and Equalities, Maria Miller, told the House of Commons that the proposals "will strengthen, not weaken" the institution of marriage.

The bill included a "quadruple lock" to safeguard religious organisations from being forced to conduct same sex marriages.

== Summary of the act ==
Provision(s)	Effect	Status
Section 1	Makes same-sex marriage legal.; Preserves the Canon law of the Church of England which states that marriage is between opposite-sex couples only.; States that the common law duty on members of the clergy to solemnise marriages does not extend to same-sex marriages.	Fully in force (since 13 March 2014).
Section 2	Provides protections for individuals and religious organisations who choose not to "opt in" to solemnise same-sex marriages from any liability including through amending the Equality Act 2010.	Fully in force (since 13 March 2014).
Section 3	Amends the Marriage Act 1949 to update the list of marriages which can be solemnised without the need for any "opt in": religious marriages for opposite-sex couples only in registered buildings; civil marriages for all couples in a register office; civil marriages for all couples in approved premises e.g. a hotel; religious marriages for opposite-sex couples by the Quakers or the Jewish religion; religious marriages for opposite-sex couples, one of whom is house-bound or detained; civil marriages for all couples, one of whom is house-bound or detained; marriages for opposite sex couples in a church or chapel of the Church of England or the Church in Wales.	Fully in force (since 13 March 2014).
Section 4 and Schedule 1.	Sets out the procedure by which religious organisations (except for the Church of England, the Church in Wales, the Quakers and the Jewish religion) can "opt in" to solemnise same-sex marriages in religious buildings.	Fully in force (since 13 March 2014).
Section 5	Sets out the procedure by which the Quakers and the Jewish religion can "opt in" to solemnise same-sex marriages.; Sets out the procedure by which religious organisations (except for the Church of England and the Church in Wales) can solemnise same-sex marriages where one or both of the same-sex couple is house-bound or detained.	Fully in force (since 13 March 2014).
Section 6	Sets out the procedure by which same-sex marriages may be solemnised in naval, military and air force chapels (except for marriages according to the rites of the Church of England or the Church in Wales).	Fully in force (since 3 June 2014).
Section 7	Amends the Marriage (Registrar General's Licence) Act 1970 so that the Registrar General can authorise a religious marriage ceremony of a same-sex couple if the relevant governing authority has consented to marriages of same-sex couples. The Registrar General is permitted to authorise marriages where one of the couple is seriously ill, is not expected to recover and cannot be moved.	Fully in force (since 13 March 2014).
Section 8	Sets out the procedure by which the Church in Wales can "opt in" to solemnise same-sex marriages. The Lord Chancellor would have to be satisfied that the Governing Body of the Church in Wales had resolved that the law should be changed to allow for the marriage of same-sex couples according to the rites of the Church in Wales. He must then make an order permitting the Church in Wales to perform same-sex marriages.	Fully in force (since 13 March 2014).
Section 9	Sets out the procedure by which couples in a civil partnership can convert their civil partnership into a marriage.	Fully in force (since 10 December 2014).
Section 10 and Schedule 2	Provides that same-sex marriages entered into outside of the United Kingdom will be recognised as a marriage in England and Wales.; Provides that same-sex marriages entered into in England and Wales will be recognised as civil partnerships in Scotland and Northern Ireland.	Fully in force (since 13 March 2014).
Section 11 and Schedules 3 and 4	Provides that, as a general rule, marriage has the same effect in relation to same sex couples as it has in relation to opposite sex couples under English law.; Sets out how English law is to be interpreted to ensure that same-sex marriages are treated in the same way as opposite-sex marriages.; Sets out certain exceptions to the general rule.	Section 11 and Schedule 3 fully in force (since 13 March 2014). Schedule 4 almost entirely in force (since between 13 March and 10 December 2014) with one exception.
Section 12 and Schedule 5	Amend the Gender Recognition Act 2004 to enable existing marriages registered in England and Wales or outside the United Kingdom to continue where one or both parties change their legal gender and both parties wish to remain married. It also amends the act to enable a civil partnership to continue where both parties change their gender simultaneously and wish to remain in their civil partnership.	Fully in force (since 10 December 2014).
Section 13 and Schedule 6	Repeals the Foreign Marriage Act 1892 in England, Wales and Scotland.; Permits secondary legislation to be made which allows for marriages to take place in overseas consulates.; Permits secondary legislation to be made which allows for certificates of no impediment to marriage to be issued where a United Kingdom national wishes to marry overseas according to local laws of that country or territory.; Permits secondary legislation to be made which allows for members of the armed forces serving overseas, and accompanying civilians, to marry in the presence of a chaplain or other authorised officer.	Fully in force (since 3 June 2014).
Section 14	Requires the government to arrange for a review of whether secondary legislation should be made which would permit belief-based organisations (such as humanists) to solemnise marriages and for a report on the outcome of the review to be produced and published before 1 January 2015.	Fully in force (since 31 October 2013).
Section 15	Requires the government to arrange for review of the operation and future of the Civil Partnership Act 2004 in England and Wales to be carried out, and for a report on the outcome of the review to be produced and published.	Fully in force (since 17 July 2013).
Section 16	Requires the government to arrange for review of certain matters relating to occupational pension schemes to be carried out, and for a report on the outcome of the review to be produced and published before 1 July 2014. Following the review, the government may make secondary legislation for the purpose of eliminating or reducing relevant differences in survivor benefits.	Fully in force (since 17 July 2013).
Section 17 and Schedule 7	Makes various transitional and consequential provisions.; Allows for secondary legislation which is needed to ensure the effective transition from marriage only being available to opposite-sex couples to being available for all couples.; Deals with transitional arrangements in relation to "approved premises", e.g. premises (such as hotels) which have been approved by local authorities as venues for civil marriages and civil partnerships, and provides that any premises in the process of applying to be approved, or already approved as a venue for marriages of opposite sex couples will automatically be approved as a venue for marriages of same sex couples. Any future applications for, and grants of, approval of premises, will be for both same sex and opposite sex civil marriage.; Makes amendments to a number of pieces of legislation in consequence of the introduction of same-sex marriage, notably the Marriage Act 1949, the Marriage (Registrar General's Licence) Act 1970, the Matrimonial Causes Act 1973, the Public Order Act 1986, the Social Security Contributions and Benefits Act 1992, the Pension Schemes Act 1993, the Civil Partnership Act 2004, the Human Fertilisation and Embryology Act 2008, and the Equality Act 2010.	Fully in force (since 17 July 2013) with some exceptions.
Section 18	Sets out which of the different procedures by which secondary legislation is made apply to the different powers to make secondary legislation in the act.	Fully in force (since 31 October 2013).
Section 19	Defines various expressions used in the act.	Fully in force (since 31 October 2013).
Section 20	Sets out the territorial extent of the act: England and Wales, with some provisions also applying to Scotland and Northern Ireland.	Fully in force (since 31 October 2013).
Section 21	Sets out the short title of the act: the Marriage (Same Sex Couples) Act 2013.; Brings into force sections 15, 16 and 21 on the date on which the act comes is passed (17 July 2013) and the rest when the Lord Chancellor or Secretary of State appoints.	Fully in force (since 17 July 2013).

== Passage through Parliament ==
=== House of Commons ===
==== First reading ====
The bill received its First Reading on 24 January 2013.

==== Second reading ====
The bill received its Second Reading on 5 February 2013, passing by a large majority of 400 to 175.

Marriage (Same Sex Couples) Bill – Second Reading
Party	Votes for	Votes against	Both (registered abstentions)	Absent
Conservative	126 (+1 teller): Stuart Andrew; Gregory Barker; John Baron; Gavin Barwell; Richard Benyon; Crispin Blunt; Nicholas Boles; Peter Bottomley; Karen Bradley; James Brokenshire; Aidan Burley; Conor Burns; Alistair Burt; Dan Byles; David Cameron; Neil Carmichael; James Clappison; Greg Clark; Kenneth Clarke; Damian Collins; Oliver Colvile; Tracey Crouch; Stephen Dorrell; James Duddridge; Alan Duncan; Iain Duncan Smith; Michael Ellis; Jane Ellison; Michael Fabricant; Mark Field; Mike Freer; Lorraine Fullbrook; David Gauke; Nick Gibb; Zac Goldsmith; Michael Gove; Richard Graham; Helen Grant; Chris Grayling; Damian Green; Justine Greening; Ben Gummer; Sam Gyimah; William Hague; Stephen Hammond; Matthew Hancock; Greg Hands; Mark Harper; Richard Harrington; Chris Heaton-Harris; Charles Hendry; Nick Herbert; Damian Hinds; George Hollingbery; Kris Hopkins; John Howell; Jeremy Hunt; Margot James; Sajid Javid; Bernard Jenkin; Jo Johnson; Andrew Jones; Daniel Kawczynski; Simon Kirby; Andrew Lansley; Jessica Lee; Oliver Letwin; Brandon Lewis; Peter Luff; Mary Macleod; Francis Maude; Theresa May; Jason McCartney; Patrick McLoughlin; Mark Menzies; Maria Miller; Nigel Mills; Andrew Mitchell; Penny Mordaunt; Stephen Mosley; David Mowat; David Mundell; Andrew Murrison; Brooks Newmark; Sarah Newton; Eric Ollerenshaw; Guy Opperman; George Osborne; Richard Ottaway; John Penrose; Andrew Percy; Eric Pickles; Christopher Pincher; Dan Poulter; Dominic Raab; Mark Reckless; Hugh Robertson; Amber Rudd; Laura Sandys; Grant Shapps; Alok Sharma; Mark Simmonds; Keith Simpson; Chris Skidmore; Chloe Smith; Julian Smith; Nicholas Soames; Anna Soubry; Caroline Spelman; Andrew Stephenson; Iain Stewart; Rory Stewart; Desmond Swayne (teller); Hugo Swire; Justin Tomlinson; Liz Truss; Edward Vaizey; Theresa Villiers; Charles Walker; Robin Walker; Angela Watkinson; Mike Weatherley; Chris White; David Willetts; Sarah Wollaston; Tim Yeo; George Young	134 (+2 tellers): Nigel Adams; Adam Afriyie; Peter Aldous; David Amess; James Arbuthnot; Richard Bacon; Steven Baker; Tony Baldry; Guto Bebb; Henry Bellingham; Paul Beresford; Andrew Bingham; Bob Blackman; Peter Bone (teller); Graham Brady; Julian Brazier; Andrew Bridgen; Steve Brine; Fiona Bruce; Robert Buckland; Simon Burns; David Burrowes; Alun Cairns; Douglas Carswell; William Cash; Rehman Chishti; Christopher Chope; Geoffrey Clifton-Brown; Thérèse Coffey (teller); Geoffrey Cox; Stephen Crabb; David Davies; Glyn Davies; Philip Davies; David Davis; Nick de Bois; Caroline Dinenage; Richard Drax; Charlie Elphicke; Jonathan Evans; David Evennett; Michael Fallon; Liam Fox; Mark Francois; George Freeman; Roger Gale; Edward Garnier; Mark Garnier; Cheryl Gillan; John Glen; Robert Goodwill; James Gray; Andrew Griffiths; Robert Halfon; Simon Hart; Alan Haselhurst; John Hayes; Oliver Heald; Gordon Henderson; Philip Hollobone; Adam Holloway; Gerald Howarth; Stewart Jackson; Gareth Johnson; David Jones; Marcus Jones; Greg Knight; Kwasi Kwarteng; Mark Lancaster; Pauline Latham; Jeremy Lefroy; Edward Leigh; Julian Lewis; David Lidington; Peter Lilley; Jack Lopresti; Jonathan Lord; Tim Loughton; Karen Lumley; Anne Main; Paul Maynard; Karl McCartney; Anne McIntosh; Stephen McPartland; Esther McVey; Stephen Metcalfe; Nicky Morgan; Anne-Marie Morris; David Morris; James Morris; Bob Neill; Caroline Nokes; David Nuttall; Stephen O'Brien; Matthew Offord; James Paice; Neil Parish; Priti Patel; Owen Paterson; Mark Pawsey; Michael Penning; Mark Pritchard; John Randall; John Redwood; Jacob Rees-Mogg; Simon Reevell; Malcolm Rifkind; Andrew Robathan; Laurence Robertson; Andrew Rosindell; David Ruffley; David Rutley; Andrew Selous; Alec Shelbrooke; Richard Shepherd; Henry Smith; John Stanley; John Stevenson; Bob Stewart; Mel Stride; Julian Sturdy; Robert Syms; Peter Tapsell; David Tredinnick; Andrew Turner; Shailesh Vara; Martin Vickers; Ben Wallace; Robert Walter; James Wharton; Heather Wheeler; Craig Whittaker; John Whittingdale; Bill Wiggin; Gavin Williamson; Jeremy Wright	5: Angie Bray; Andrea Leadsom; Phillip Lee; Charlotte Leslie; Rob Wilson	36: Harriett Baldwin; Steve Barclay; Jake Berry; Brian Binley; Nicola Blackwood; Jonathan Djanogly; Jackie Doyle-Price; Philip Dunne; Tobias Ellwood; George Eustice; Graham Evans; Nigel Evans; Richard Fuller; Dominic Grieve; Philip Hammond; Rebecca Harris; Mark Hoban; Nick Hurd; Chris Kelly; Eleanor Laing; Ian Liddell-Grainger; Patrick Mercer; Anne Milton; Sheryll Murray; Jesse Norman; Claire Perry; Stephen Phillips; Mark Prisk; Lee Scott; Mark Spencer; Gary Streeter; Graham Stuart; Edward Timpson; Andrew Tyrie; Paul Uppal; Nadhim Zahawi
Labour	217: Diane Abbott; Debbie Abrahams; Bob Ainsworth; Douglas Alexander; Heidi Alexander; Rushanara Ali; Graham Allen; David Anderson; Jonathan Ashworth; Ian Austin; Adrian Bailey; William Bain; Edward Balls; Gordon Banks; Kevin Barron; Hugh Bayley; Margaret Beckett; Hilary Benn; Luciana Berger; Clive Betts; Roberta Blackman-Woods; Hazel Blears; Tom Blenkinsop; Paul Blomfield; David Blunkett; Ben Bradshaw; Kevin Brennan; Lyn Brown; Nick Brown; Russell Brown; Chris Bryant; Karen Buck; Richard Burden; Andy Burnham; Liam Byrne; Alan Campbell; Martin Caton; Sarah Champion; Jenny Chapman; Katy Clark; Ann Clwyd; Vernon Coaker; Ann Coffey; Michael Connarty; Yvette Cooper; Jeremy Corbyn; Mary Creagh; Stella Creasy; Jon Cruddas; John Cryer; Jim Cunningham; Margaret Curran; Nicholas Dakin; Simon Danczuk; Alistair Darling; Wayne David; Ian Davidson; Geraint Davies; Gloria De Piero; John Denham; Frank Dobson; Thomas Docherty; Frank Doran; Stephen Doughty; Jim Dowd; Gemma Doyle; Jack Dromey; Michael Dugher; Angela Eagle; Maria Eagle; Clive Efford; Julie Elliott; Louise Ellman; Natascha Engel; Chris Evans; Paul Farrelly; Frank Field; Jim Fitzpatrick; Caroline Flint; Paul Flynn; Yvonne Fovargue; Hywel Francis; Mike Gapes; Barry Gardiner; Sheila Gilmore; Helen Goodman; Tom Greatrex; Kate Green; Lilian Greenwood; Nia Griffith; Andrew Gwynne; Peter Hain; David Hamilton; Fabian Hamilton; David Hanson; Harriet Harman; Tom Harris; John Healey; Mark Hendrick; Stephen Hepburn; Meg Hillier; Julie Hilling; Margaret Hodge; Sharon Hodgson; Kate Hoey; Kelvin Hopkins; George Howarth; Tristram Hunt; Huw Irranca-Davies; Glenda Jackson; Siân James; Cathy Jamieson; Dan Jarvis; Alan Johnson; Diana Johnson; Graham Jones; Helen Jones; Kevan Jones; Susan Elan Jones; Tessa Jowell; Gerald Kaufman; Barbara Keeley; Liz Kendall; Sadiq Khan; David Lammy; Ian Lavery; Mark Lazarowicz; Christopher Leslie; Ivan Lewis; Andrew Love; Ian Lucas; Fiona Mactaggart; Shabana Mahmood; Seema Malhotra; John Mann; Gordon Marsden; Stephen McCabe; Kerry McCarthy; Gregg McClymont; Siobhain McDonagh; Andrew McDonald; John McDonnell; Pat McFadden; Alison McGovern; Anne McGuire; Ann McKechin; Catherine McKinnell; Alan Meale; David Miliband; Edward Miliband; Andrew Miller; Austin Mitchell; Madeleine Moon; Jessica Morden; Graeme Morrice; Grahame Morris; Meg Munn; Jim Murphy; Ian Murray; Lisa Nandy; Pamela Nash; Fiona O'Donnell; Chi Onwurah; Sandra Osborne; Albert Owen; Teresa Pearce; Toby Perkins; Bridget Phillipson; Lucy Powell; Nick Raynsford; Jamie Reed; Steve Reed; Rachel Reeves; Emma Reynolds; Jonathan Reynolds; Linda Riordan; John Robertson; Geoffrey Robinson; Steve Rotheram; Lindsay Roy; Chris Ruane; Joan Ruddock; Anas Sarwar; Andy Sawford; Alison Seabeck; Barry Sheerman; Dennis Skinner; Andy Slaughter; Andrew Smith; Angela Smith; Nick Smith; Owen Smith; John Spellar; Jack Straw; Graham Stringer; Gisela Stuart; Gerry Sutcliffe; Mark Tami; Gareth Thomas; Emily Thornberry; Jon Trickett; Karl Turner; Stephen Twigg; Chuka Umunna; Keith Vaz; Valerie Vaz; Joan Walley; Tom Watson; Dave Watts; Alan Whitehead; Chris Williamson; Phil Wilson; David Winnick; Rosie Winterton; John Woodcock; David Wright; Iain Wright	22: Joe Benton; Ronnie Campbell; Tom Clarke; Rosie Cooper; David Crausby; Tony Cunningham; Jim Dobbin; Brian H Donohoe; Robert Flello; Mary Glindon; Paul Goggins; Dai Havard; Michael McCann; Jim McGovern; Iain McKenzie; George Mudie; Paul Murphy; Stephen Pound; Frank Roy; Jim Sheridan; Derek Twigg; Mike Wood	–	18: Anne Begg; Gordon Brown; Alex Cunningham; Bill Esterson; Pat Glass; Roger Godsiff; David Heyes; Jimmy Hood; Lindsay Hoyle; Khalid Mahmood; Michael Meacher; Ian Mearns; Dawn Primarolo; Yasmin Qureshi; Virendra Sharma; Gavin Shuker; Stephen Timms; Shaun Woodward
Liberal Democrats	44 (+1 teller): Danny Alexander; Tom Brake; Annette Brooke; Jeremy Browne; Malcolm Bruce; Paul Burstow; Lorely Burt; Vincent Cable; Menzies Campbell; Alistair Carmichael; Nicholas Clegg; Michael Crockart; Edward Davey; Tim Farron; Lynne Featherstone; Don Foster; Andrew George; Stephen Gilbert; Duncan Hames; Mike Hancock; Nick Harvey; David Heath; John Hemming; Simon Hughes; Mark Hunter (teller); Julian Huppert; Norman Lamb; David Laws; John Leech; Stephen Lloyd; Michael Moore; Tessa Munt; Alan Reid; Dan Rogerson; Bob Russell; Adrian Sanders; Robert Smith; Andrew Stunell; Ian Swales; Jo Swinson; Steve Webb; Mark Williams; Roger Williams; Stephen Williams; Simon Wright	4: Alan Beith; Gordon Birtwistle; John Pugh; Sarah Teather	–	7: Norman Baker; Martin Horwood; Charles Kennedy; Greg Mulholland; John Thurso; David Ward; Jennifer Willott
SNP	–	–	–	6: Stewart Hosie; Angus MacNeil; Angus Robertson; Mike Weir; Eilidh Whiteford; Pete Wishart
DUP	–	8: Gregory Campbell; Nigel Dodds; Jeffrey Donaldson; William McCrea; Ian Paisley Jr; Jim Shannon; David Simpson; Sammy Wilson	–	–
Plaid Cymru	3: Jonathan Edwards; Elfyn Llwyd; Hywel Williams	–	–	–
Green	1: Caroline Lucas	–	–	–
SDLP	1: Mark Durkan	–	–	2: Alasdair McDonnell; Margaret Ritchie
Alliance	1: Naomi Long	–	–	–
Respect	1: George Galloway	–	–	–
Independents	1: Eric Joyce	2: Sylvia Hermon; Nadine Dorries	–	–
Total	395 (+2 tellers)	170 (+2 tellers)	5	74

Map of MPs by their vote and party on the second reading of the Bill, 5 February 2013 (Aye votes are in blue and dark blue).

The SNP did not vote, as the Bill largely applies to England and Wales only.

==== Committee stage ====
The bill was examined by the Marriage (Same Sex Couples) Bill Committee, a Public Bill Committee established to scrutinise the Bill line-by-line. The committee made no amendments to the Bill and returned it to the House of Commons on 12 March 2013.

Prior to its scrutiny of the Bill, the Committee heard evidence from a number of witnesses. On 12 February 2013, the Committee heard evidence from the Church of England, the Catholic Bishops' Conference of England and Wales, the Church in Wales, Lord Pannick, Baroness Kennedy of the Shaws, Stonewall, the Lesbian and Gay Foundation, the Gender Identity Research and Education Society, Liberal Judaism, the Board of Deputies of British Jews, Out4Marriage, the Coalition for Marriage, and Julian Rivers of the University of Bristol Law School.

On 14 February 2013, the Committee heard evidence from the Religious Society of Friends (the Quakers in Britain), the General Assembly of Unitarian and Free Christian Churches, the Methodist Church, the United Reformed Church, Liberty, the Equality and Human Rights Commission, the Cooperative Group, Schools OUT, the PSHE Association, Jeffrey John, Alice Arnold, Brendan O'Neill, and Mark Jones of Ormerod Solicitors.

Members of the Public Bill Committee included:

Member	Party	Constituency
Jimmy Hood MP (Chair)	Labour	Lanark and Hamilton East
Gary Streeter MP (Chair)	Conservative	South West Devon
Stuart Andrew MP	Conservative	Pudsey
Ben Bradshaw MP	Labour	Exeter
Chris Bryant MP	Labour	Rhondda
David Burrowes MP	Conservative	Enfield Southgate
Stephen Doughty MP	Labour	Cardiff South and Penarth
Jane Ellison MP	Conservative	Battersea
Steve Gilbert MP	Liberal Democrat	St Austell and Newquay
Helen Grant MP	Conservative	Maidstone and The Weald
Kate Green MP	Labour	Stretford and Urmston
Simon Kirby MP	Conservative	Brighton Kemptown
Kwasi Kwarteng MP	Conservative	Spelthorne
Tim Loughton MP	Conservative	East Worthing and Shoreham
Siobhain McDonagh MP	Labour	Mitcham and Morden
Alison McGovern MP	Labour	Wirral South
Jonathan Reynolds MP	Labour Co-op	Stalybridge and Hyde
Hugh Robertson MP	Conservative	Faversham and Mid Kent
Jim Shannon MP	Democratic Unionist Party	Strangford
Desmond Swayne MP	Conservative	New Forest West
Stephen Williams MP	Liberal Democrat	Bristol West

==== Report stage ====
The bill was examined by the House of Commons as a whole during the Report Stage on 20 and 21 May 2013. During the Report Stage, a number of amendments were made to the Bill:

- A new clause was inserted which makes clear that chaplains who are employed by a non-religious organisation (such as in a hospital or a university) who refuse to conduct a same sex marriage will not contravene anti-discrimination legislation.
- Clause 8 was amended to state that if the Governing Body of the Church in Wales makes clear that it wishes to conduct same sex marriages, the Lord Chancellor must make an order allowing it to do so, rather than simply having the power to do so.
- Following pressure on the government to open up access to civil partnerships for opposite-sex couples, a new clause was inserted which will require there to be a review of the operation and future of the Civil Partnership Act 2004 in England and Wales as soon as practicable.

==== Third reading ====
The bill received its Third Reading in the House of Commons on 21 May 2013, passing with a majority of 366 to 161.

Marriage (Same Sex Couples) Bill – Third Reading
Party	Votes for	Votes against	Both (Registered abstentions)	Did Not Vote
Conservative	118 (+1 teller): Stuart Andrew; Harriett Baldwin; Steve Barclay; Gregory Barker; John Baron; Gavin Barwell; Richard Benyon; Crispin Blunt; Nicholas Boles; Peter Bottomley; Karen Bradley; James Brokenshire; Aidan Burley; Alistair Burt; Dan Byles; David Cameron; Neil Carmichael; Greg Clark; Oliver Colvile; Tracey Crouch; Stephen Dorrell; James Duddridge; Alan Duncan; Iain Duncan Smith; Michael Ellis; Jane Ellison; Tobias Ellwood; Michael Fabricant; Mark Field; Mike Freer; Lorraine Fullbrook; Richard Fuller; David Gauke; Nick Gibb; Zac Goldsmith; Michael Gove; Helen Grant; Chris Grayling; Damian Green; Justine Greening; Ben Gummer; Sam Gyimah; Stephen Hammond; Matthew Hancock; Greg Hands; Mark Harper; Richard Harrington; Rebecca Harris; Chris Heaton-Harris; Charles Hendry; Nick Herbert; Damian Hinds; George Hollingbery; Kris Hopkins; Jeremy Hunt; Margot James; Sajid Javid; Bernard Jenkin; Jo Johnson; Andrew Jones; Daniel Kawczynski; Simon Kirby; Andrew Lansley; Pauline Latham; Jessica Lee; Oliver Letwin; Brandon Lewis; Peter Luff; Mary Macleod; Francis Maude; Theresa May; Jason McCartney; Patrick McLoughlin; Mark Menzies; Maria Miller; Nigel Mills; Andrew Mitchell; Penny Mordaunt; Stephen Mosley; David Mowat; Brooks Newmark; Eric Ollerenshaw; Guy Opperman; George Osborne; Richard Ottaway; John Penrose; Andrew Percy; Stephen Phillips; Eric Pickles; Dan Poulter; Dominic Raab; Hugh Robertson; Amber Rudd; Laura Sandys; Grant Shapps; Mark Simmonds; Chris Skidmore; Chloe Smith; Julian Smith; Anna Soubry; Caroline Spelman; Andrew Stephenson; Iain Stewart; Desmond Swayne (teller); Justin Tomlinson; Liz Truss; Edward Vaizey; Theresa Villiers; Charles Walker; Robin Walker; Angela Watkinson; Mike Weatherley; Chris White; David Willetts; Sarah Wollaston; Tim Yeo; George Young; Nadhim Zahawi	127 (+2 tellers): Nigel Adams; Adam Afriyie; Peter Aldous; David Amess; Richard Bacon; Guto Bebb; Henry Bellingham; Paul Beresford; Andrew Bingham; Nicola Blackwood; Peter Bone; Graham Brady; Julian Brazier; Andrew Bridgen; Steve Brine; Fiona Bruce; Robert Buckland; Simon Burns; David Burrowes; Douglas Carswell; William Cash; Rehman Chishti; Christopher Chope; Thérèse Coffey; Geoffrey Cox; Stephen Crabb; David Davies; Glyn Davies; Philip Davies; David Davis; Nick de Bois; Nadine Dorries; Jackie Doyle-Price; Richard Drax; Charlie Elphicke; Jonathan Evans; David Evennett; Liam Fox; Mark Francois; George Freeman; Roger Gale; Edward Garnier; Mark Garnier; Cheryl Gillan; John Glen; Robert Goodwill; James Gray; Andrew Griffiths; Robert Halfon; Simon Hart; Alan Haselhurst; John Hayes; Oliver Heald; Gordon Henderson; Philip Hollobone; Adam Holloway; Gerald Howarth; Stewart Jackson; Gareth Johnson; David Jones; Marcus Jones; Greg Knight; Kwasi Kwarteng; Mark Lancaster (teller); Jeremy Lefroy; Edward Leigh; Julian Lewis; Ian Liddell-Grainger; David Lidington; Peter Lilley; Jonathan Lord; Tim Loughton; Karen Lumley; Anne Main; Paul Maynard; Karl McCartney; Anne McIntosh; Stephen McPartland; Esther McVey; Stephen Metcalfe; Anne Milton; Nicky Morgan; Anne-Marie Morris; David Morris; James Morris; Bob Neill; David Nuttall; Stephen O'Brien; Matthew Offord; James Paice; Neil Parish; Priti Patel; Owen Paterson; Mark Pawsey; Michael Penning; Mark Pritchard; John Randall (teller); John Redwood; Jacob Rees-Mogg; Malcolm Rifkind; Andrew Robathan; Laurence Robertson; Andrew Rosindell; David Rutley; Lee Scott; Andrew Selous; Alec Shelbrooke; Richard Shepherd; Henry Smith; John Stanley; John Stevenson; Bob Stewart; Mel Stride; Julian Sturdy; Robert Syms; David Tredinnick; Andrew Turner; Shailesh Vara; Martin Vickers; Ben Wallace; Robert Walter; James Wharton; Heather Wheeler; Craig Whittaker; John Whittingdale; Bill Wiggin; Gavin Williamson; Jeremy Wright	7: Graham Evans; John Howell; Andrea Leadsom; Philip Lee; Charlotte Leslie; Claire Perry; Rob Wilson	51: James Arbuthnot; Steven Baker; Tony Baldry; Jake Berry; Brian Binley; Bob Blackman; Angie Bray; Conor Burns; Alun Cairns; James Clappison; Kenneth Clarke; Geoffrey Clifton-Brown; Damian Collins; Caroline Dinenage; Jonathan Djanogly; George Eustice; Nigel Evans; Michael Fallon; Richard Graham; Dominic Grieve; William Hague; Philip Hammond; Mark Hoban; Nick Hurd; Greg Knight; Eleanor Laing; Jack Lopresti; Patrick Mercer; David Mundell; Sheryll Murray; Andrew Murrison; Sarah Newton; Caroline Nokes; Jesse Norman; Christopher Pincher; Mark Prisk; Mark Reckless; Simon Reevell; David Ruffley; Alok Sharma; Keith Simpson; Nicholas Soames; Mark Spencer; Rory Stewart; Gary Streeter; Graham Stuart; Hugo Swire; Peter Tapsell; Edward Timpson; Andrew Tyrie; Paul Uppal
Labour	194: Diane Abbott; Debbie Abrahams; Douglas Alexander; Heidi Alexander; Rushanara Ali; Graham Allen; Jonathan Ashworth; Adrian Bailey; William Bain; Edward Balls; Gordon Banks; Kevin Barron; Hugh Bayley; Margaret Beckett; Anne Begg; Hilary Benn; Luciana Berger; Clive Betts; Roberta Blackman-Woods; Tom Blenkinsop; Paul Blomfield; Ben Bradshaw; Kevin Brennan; Gordon Brown; Lyn Brown; Chris Bryant; Karen Buck; Richard Burden; Andy Burnham; Liam Byrne; Alan Campbell; Martin Caton; Sarah Champion; Jenny Chapman; Katy Clark; Ann Clwyd; Vernon Coaker; Ann Coffey; Yvette Cooper; Jeremy Corbyn; Mary Creagh; Stella Creasy; Jon Cruddas; John Cryer; Jim Cunningham; Margaret Curran; Nicholas Dakin; Simon Danczuk; Alistair Darling; Wayne David; Ian Davidson; Geraint Davies; Gloria De Piero; John Denham; Frank Dobson; Stephen Doughty; Jim Dowd; Gemma Doyle; Jack Dromey; Michael Dugher; Angela Eagle; Maria Eagle; Clive Efford; Julie Elliott; Louise Ellman; Natascha Engel; Bill Esterson; Chris Evans; Paul Farrelly; Frank Field; Jim Fitzpatrick; Caroline Flint; Paul Flynn; Yvonne Fovargue; Hywel Francis; Mike Gapes; Barry Gardiner; Sheila Gilmore; Pat Glass; Kate Green; Lilian Greenwood; Nia Griffith; Andrew Gwynne; David Hamilton; Fabian Hamilton; David Hanson; Tom Harris; John Healey; Mark Hendrick; Stephen Hepburn; Meg Hillier; Julie Hilling; Margaret Hodge; Sharon Hodgson; Kate Hoey; Kelvin Hopkins; George Howarth; Huw Irranca-Davies; Cathy Jamieson; Dan Jarvis; Alan Johnson; Graham Jones; Kevan Jones; Susan Elan Jones; Tessa Jowell; Gerald Kaufman; Barbara Keeley; Liz Kendall; David Lammy; Ian Lavery; Mark Lazarowicz; Chris Leslie; Emma Lewell-Buck; Andrew Love; Fiona Mactaggart; Shabana Mahmood; Seema Malhotra; John Mann; Gordon Marsden; Steve McCabe; Kerry McCarthy; Gregg McClymont; Siobhain McDonagh; Andrew McDonald; Pat McFadden; Alison McGovern; Anne McGuire; Ann McKechin; Iain McKenzie; Catherine McKinnell; Michael Meacher; Alan Meale; Ian Mearns; Ed Miliband; Madeleine Moon; Jessica Morden; Graeme Morrice; Grahame Morris; Meg Munn; Jim Murphy; Ian Murray; Lisa Nandy; Pamela Nash; Fiona O'Donnell; Chi Onwurah; Sandra Osborne; Albert Owen; Teresa Pearce; Toby Perkins; Bridget Phillipson; Yasmin Qureshi; Nick Raynsford; Jamie Reed; Steve Reed; Emma Reynolds; Jonathan Reynolds; Linda Riordan; John Robertson; Geoffrey Robinson; Steve Rotheram; Frank Roy; Lindsay Roy; Chris Ruane; Andy Sawford; Alison Seabeck; Virendra Sharma; Barry Sheerman; Dennis Skinner; Andy Slaughter; Andrew Smith; Nick Smith; Owen Smith; Jack Straw; Graham Stringer; Gisela Stuart; Gerry Sutcliffe; Mark Tami; Gareth Thomas; Emily Thornberry; Karl Turner; Stephen Twigg; Chuka Umunna; Valerie Vaz; Joan Walley; Tom Watson; Alan Whitehead; Chris Williamson; Phil Wilson; David Winnick; Rosie Winterton; Mike Wood; Shaun Woodward; David Wright; Iain Wright	14: Joe Benton; Tom Clarke; Rosie Cooper; David Crausby; Jim Dobbin; Brian H Donohoe; Robert Flello; Mary Glindon; Roger Godsiff; Paul Goggins; George Mudie; Paul Murphy; Stephen Pound; Stephen Timms	–	46: Bob Ainsworth; David Anderson; Ian Austin; Hazel Blears; David Blunkett; Nick Brown; Russell Brown; Ronnie Campbell; Michael Connarty; Alex Cunningham; Tony Cunningham; Thomas Docherty; Frank Doran; Helen Goodman; Tom Greatrex; Peter Hain; Harriet Harman; Dai Havard; David Heyes; Jimmy Hood; Lindsay Hoyle; Tristram Hunt; Glenda Jackson; Siân James; Diana Johnson; Helen Jones; Sadiq Khan; Ivan Lewis; Ian Lucas; Khalid Mahmood; Michael McCann; John McDonnell; Jim McGovern; Andrew Miller; Austin Mitchell; Lucy Powell; Dawn Primarolo; Rachel Reeves; Joan Ruddock; Anas Sarwar; Jim Sheridan; Gavin Shuker; Angela Smith; John Spellar; Jon Trickett; Derek Twigg
Liberal Democrats	43 (+1 teller): Danny Alexander; Norman Baker; Tom Brake; Annette Brooke; Jeremy Browne; Paul Burstow; Lorely Burt; Vincent Cable; Menzies Campbell; Alistair Carmichael; Nicholas Clegg; Michael Crockart; Edward Davey; Lynne Featherstone; Don Foster; Andrew George; Stephen Gilbert; Duncan Hames; Mike Hancock; Nick Harvey; David Heath; John Hemming; Martin Horwood; Julian Huppert; Charles Kennedy; David Laws; Stephen Lloyd; Michael Moore; Greg Mulholland; Tessa Munt; Alan Reid; Dan Rogerson; Bob Russell; Adrian Sanders; Andrew Stunell; Ian Swales; Jo Swinson; Mike Thornton; John Thurso; Steve Webb; Mark Williams; Roger Williams; Stephen Williams; Simon Wright	4: Alan Beith; Gordon Birtwistle; John Pugh; Sarah Teather	–	9: Malcolm Bruce; Tim Farron; Simon Hughes; Mark Hunter (teller); Norman Lamb; John Leech; Robert Smith; David Ward; Jennifer Willott
SNP	–	–	–	6: Stewart Hosie; Angus MacNeil; Angus Robertson; Mike Weir; Eilidh Whiteford; Pete Wishart
DUP	–	8: Gregory Campbell; Nigel Dodds; Jeffrey Donaldson; William McCrea; Ian Paisley Jr; Jim Shannon; David Simpson; Sammy Wilson	–	–
Plaid Cymru	2: Jonathan Edwards; Elfyn Llwyd	–	–	1: Hywel Williams
Green	1: Caroline Lucas	–	–	–
SDLP	2: Mark Durkan; Alasdair McDonnell	–	–	1: Margaret Ritchie
Alliance	–	–	–	1: Naomi Long
Respect	–	–	–	1: George Galloway
Independents	–	1: Sylvia Hermon	–	1: Eric Joyce
Total	359 (+2 tellers)	154 (+2 tellers)	7	120

=== House of Lords ===
==== First reading ====
The bill received its First Reading in the House of Lords on 21 May 2013.

==== Second reading ====
The bill passed its Second Reading in the House of Lords on 3 and 4 June 2013, after a vote of 390 (72%) votes to 148 (28%) rejected a wrecking amendment that would have denied it a second reading. The bill was supported (and the amendment rejected) by a majority from nearly every party having representation in the House.

The House of Lords – whose members at the time averaged an age of 69 – primarily acts as a reviewing chamber, and the second reading is often in effect about the principles of a bill. The bill was therefore expected to be faced with a difficult hurdle, including strong, vocal opposition. A rarely used "wrecking" motion was tabled by Lord Dear, to effectively reject the bill in full, in place of its second reading.

I beg to move, as an amendment to the motion "That the bill be now read a second time", to leave out from "that" to the end and insert "this House declines to give the bill a second reading".

— The wrecking amendment moved by Lord Dear

Speakers opposed to the bill described it as a breach of tradition, undemocratic, against religion, and ill thought out. Supporters of the bill included peers who were themselves in long-term same-sex relationships (Lord Alli, Baroness Barker, Lord Black of Brentwood, Lord Smith of Finsbury), and a fourth whose daughter was in a same-sex relationship, as well as heterosexual peers such as Lord Jenkin who had been supportive of gay rights for decades. Nine of the 14 Anglican bishops attending voted for the amendment and five abstained.

The final vote of almost 3–1 against the amendment, and in favour of the bill as it stood, was described by media and other observers as "very remarkable", "crush[ing]" and "overwhelming".

Marriage (Same Sex Couples) Bill – Dear Amendment to reject Second Reading
Party	Votes for (rejects bill)	Votes against (supports bill)	Did Not Vote (Note: Note: this figure does not include peers that are deceased, have been granted a leave of absence or have been disqualified.)
Labour	16: Anderson of Swansea, L; Brennan, L; Brooks of Tremorfa, L; Carter of Coles, L; Clarke of Hampstead, L; Davies of Coity, L; Gordon of Strathblane, L; Grenfell, L; Howie of Troon, L; Kirkhill, L; Leitch, L; Morris of Aberavon, L; Patel of Blackburn, L; Pendry, L; Simon, V; Temple-Morris, L	160: Adams of Craigielea, B.; Adonis, L.; Alli, L.; Andrews, B.; Armstrong of Hill Top, B.; Bakewell, B.; Barnett, L.; Bassam of Brighton, L.; Beecham, L.; Berkeley, L.; Bhattacharyya, L.; Billingham, B.; Bilston, L.; Blackstone, B.; Blood, B.; Boateng, L.; Borrie, L.; Bradley, L.; Brooke of Alverthorpe, L.; Brookman, L.; Browne of Ladyton, L.; Campbell-Savours, L.; Chandos, V.; Christopher, L.; Clinton-Davis, L.; Collins of Highbury, L.; Corston, B.; Crawley, B.; Darzi of Denham, L.; Davidson of Glen Clova, L.; Davies of Abersoch, L.; Davies of Oldham, L.; Davies of Stamford, L.; Dean of Thornton-le-Fylde, B.; Desai, L.; Donaghy, B.; Drake, B.; Drayson, L.; Dubs, L.; Elder, L.; Evans of Parkside, L.; Evans of Temple Guiting, L.; Evans of Watford, L.; Falconer of Thoroton, L.; Farrington of Ribbleton, B.; Faulkner of Worcester, L.; Foster of Bishop Auckland, L.; Foulkes of Cumnock, L.; Gale, B.; Gibson of Market Rasen, B.; Giddens, L.; Goldsmith, L.; Goudie, B.; Gould of Potternewton, B.; Grantchester, L.; Grocott, L.; Hanworth, V.; Harris of Haringey, L.; Harrison, L.; Hart of Chilton, L.; Haskel, L.; Hattersley, L.; Haworth, L.; Hayter of Kentish Town, B.; Healy of Primrose Hill, B.; Henig, B.; Hilton of Eggardon, B.; Hollick, L.; Hollis of Heigham, B.; Howarth of Newport, L.; Howells of St Davids, B.; Hoyle, L.; Hughes of Stretford, B.; Hughes of Woodside, L.; Hunt of Chesterton, L.; Hunt of Kings Heath, L.; Irvine of Lairg, L.; Janner of Braunstone, L.; Jay of Paddington, B.; Joffe, L.; Jones, L.; Judd, L.; Kennedy of Southwark, L.; Kennedy of The Shaws, B.; King of Bow, B.; Kingsmill, B.; Kinnock of Holyhead, B.; Kinnock, L.; Knight of Weymouth, L.; Levy, L.; Lipsey, L.; Lister of Burtersett, B.; McConnell of Glenscorrodale, L.; McDonagh, B.; Macdonald of Tradeston, L.; McIntosh of Hudnall, B.; MacKenzie of Culkein, L.; McKenzie of Luton, L.; Mallalieu, B.; Mandelson, L.; Massey of Darwen, B.; Maxton, L.; Mitchell, L.; Monks, L.; Moonie, L.; Morgan of Ely, B.; Morgan of Huyton, B.; Morgan, L.; Morris of Handsworth, L.; Morris of Yardley, B.; Myners, L.; Noon, L.; Nye, B.; O'Neill of Clackmannan, L.; Parekh, L.; Patel of Bradford, L.; Pitkeathley, B.; Plant of Highfield, L.; Ponsonby of Shulbrede, L.; Prescott, L.; Prosser, B.; Puttnam, L.; Radice, L.; Ramsay of Cartvale, B.; Rea, L.; Reid of Cardowan, L.; Rendell of Babergh, B.; Richard, L.; Robertson of Port Ellen, L.; Rosser, L.; Rowlands, L.; Royall of Blaisdon, B.; Sawyer, L.; Sherlock, B.; Smith of Basildon, B.; Smith of Leigh, L.; Soley, L.; Stevenson of Balmacara, L.; Stone of Blackheath, L.; Symons of Vernham Dean, B.; Taylor of Blackburn, L.; Taylor of Bolton, B.; Thornton, B.; Triesman, L.; Tunnicliffe, L.; Turnberg, L.; =Turner of Camden, B.; Wall of New Barnet, B.; Warner, L.; Warwick of Undercliffe, B.; Watson of Invergowrie, L.; West of Spithead, L.; Wheeler, B.; Whitaker, B.; Wilkins, B.; Wills, L.; Wood of Anfield, L.; Woolmer of Leeds, L.; Worthington, B.; Young of Norwood Green, L.	–
Conservative	66: Arran, E; Bell, L; Blencathra, L; Brougham and Vaux, L; Browning, B; Byford, B; Cathcart, E; Cormack, L; Cumberlege, B; Eaton, B; Eccles of Mouton, B; Eccles, V; Eden of Winton, L; Edmiston, L; Elton, L; Feldman, L; Flight, L; Fookes, B; Forsyth of Drumlean, L; Framlingham, L; Gardner of Parkes, B; Geddes, L; Glenarthur, L; Griffiths of Fforestfach, L; Hooper, B; Howard of Rising, L; Hurd of Westwell, L; James of Blackheath, L; Knight of Collingtree, B; Lawson of Blaby, L; Leach of Fairford, L; Liverpool, E; Lothian, M; Luke, L; Lyell, L; Macfarlane of Bearsden, L; Mackay of Clashfern, L; Magan of Castletown, L; Mancroft, L; Marlesford, L; Mawhinney, L; McColl of Dulwich, L; Miller of Hendon, B; Montrose, D; Naseby, L; O'Cathain, B; Oppenheim-Barnes, B; Palumbo, L; Parkinson, L; Patten, L; Plumb, L; Sanderson of Bowden, L; Sassoon, L; Seccombe, B; Sharples, B; Shaw of Northstead, L; Sheikh, L; Skelmersdale, L; Stewartby, L; Swinfen, L; Tebbit, L; Trenchard, V; Trumpington, B; Ullswater, V; Vinson, L; Waddington, L	80: Anelay of St Johns, B. [Teller]; Ashton of Hyde, L.; Astor of Hever, L.; Astor, V.; Attlee, E.; Baker of Dorking, L.; Bates, L.; Black of Brentwood, L.; Bottomley of Nettlestone, B.; Brabazon of Tara, L.; Bridgeman, V.; Brooke of Sutton Mandeville, L.; Caithness, E.; Chalker of Wallasey, B.; Colwyn, L.; Cope of Berkeley, L.; Courtown, E.; Crickhowell, L.; De Mauley, L.; Deben, L.; Deighton, L.; Dixon-Smith, L.; Dobbs, L.; Dundee, E.; Faulks, L.; Feldman of Elstree, L.; Fellowes of West Stafford, L.; Fink, L.; Fowler, L.; Freud, L.; Gardiner of Kimble, L.; Garel-Jones, L.; Glendonbrook, L.; Glentoran, L.; Gold, L.; Goodlad, L.; Hamilton of Epsom, L.; Hanham, B.; Harris of Peckham, L.; Henley, L.; Heseltine, L.; Higgins, L.; Hill of Oareford, L.; Hodgson of Astley Abbotts, L.; Howard of Lympne, L.; Howe, E.; Hunt of Wirral, L.; Jenkin of Kennington, B.; Jenkin of Roding, L.; Jopling, L.; King of Bridgwater, L.; Kirkham, L.; Lexden, L.; Lloyd-Webber, L.; Lucas, L.; Mayhew of Twysden, L.; Morris of Bolton, B.; Nash, L.; Neville-Jones, B.; Newlove, B.; Noakes, B.; Norton of Louth, L.; Perry of Southwark, B.; Popat, L.; Risby, L.; Rotherwick, L.; Selborne, E.; Shackleton of Belgravia, B.; Shephard of Northwold, B.; tedman-Scott, B.; Stowell of Beeston, B.; Taylor of Holbeach, L.; Trimble, L.; Tugendhat, L.; Verma, B.; Waldegrave of North Hill, L.; Wasserman, L.; Wheatcroft, B.; Wilcox, B.; Younger of Leckie, V.	63: Ahmad of Wimbledon, L; Ashcroft, L; Berridge, B; Blackwell, L; Bowness, L; Brittan of Spennithorne, L; Buscombe, B; Campbell of Alloway, L; Carrington, L; Cavendish of Furness, L; Chadlington, L; Coe, L; Crathorne, L; Denham, L; Fraser of Carmyllie, L; Freeman, L; Goschen, V; Grade of Yarmouth, L; Green of Hurstpierpoint, L; Hayhoe, L; Heyhoe Flint, B; Home, E; Howe of Aberavon, L; Howell of Guildford, L; Inglewood, L; James of Holland Park, B; Kimball, L; Lamont of Lerwick, L; Lang of Monkton, L; Lindsay, E; Lingfield, L; MacGregor of Pulham Market, L; MacLaurin of Knebworth, L; Marland, L; Montagu of Beaulieu, L; Moore of Lower Marsh, L; Moynihan, L; Northbrook, L; Patten of Barnes, L; Rawlings, B; Renfrew of Kaimsthorn, L; Renton of Mount Harry, L; Ribeiro, L; Ridley, V; Roberts of Conwy, L; Saatchi, L; Selkirk of Douglas, L; Selsdon, L; Sheppard of Didgemere, L; Shrewsbury, E; Soulsby of Swaffham Prior, L; Spicer, L; Sterling of Plaistow, L; Strathclyde, L; Trefgarne, L; True, L; Wade of Chorlton, L; Wakeham, L; Warsi, B; Wei, L; Wolfson of Aspley Guise, L; Wolfson of Sunningdale, L; Young of Graffham, L
Crossbenchers	46: Allenby, V; Butler of Brockwell, L; Butler-Sloss, L; Carey of Clifton, L; Carswell, L; Cobbold, L; Cox, L; Craig of Radley, L; Curry of Kirkharle, L; Dannatt, L; Dear, L; Deech, B; Eames, L; Emerton, B; Erroll, E; Gutherie of Craigiebank, L; Hameed, L; Hardie, L; Hylton, L; Inge, L; Kilclooney, L; Lewis of Newnham, L; Listowel, E; Lloyd of Berwick, L; Luce, L; Lytton, E; Mar, C; Martin of Springburn, L; Masham of Ilton, B; Mawson, L; Montgomery of Alamein, V; Northbourne, L; O'Loan, B; Palmer, L; Quirk, L; Rowe-Beddoe, L; Saltoun, L; Sandwich, E; Scott of Foscote, L; Singh, L; Slim, V; Tenby, V; Tombs, L; Walker of Aldringham, L; Walpole, L; Walton of Detchant, L	68: Aberdare, L.; Adebowale, L.; Afshar, B.; Baldwin of Bewdley, E.; Berkeley of Knighton, L.; Best, L.; Bichard, L.; Bilimoria, L.; Birt, L.; Blair of Boughton, L.; Broers, L.; Brookeborough, V.; Brown of Eaton-under-Heywood, L.; Browne of Madingley, L.; Burns, L.; Cameron of Dillington, L.; Cameron of Lochbroom, L.; Campbell of Surbiton, B.; Clancarty, E.; Colville of Culross, V.; Condon, L.; Coussins, B.; Craigavon, V.; Elystan-Morgan, L.; Fellowes, L.; Flather, B.; Freyberg, L.; Greengross, B.; Grey-Thompson, B.; Hannay of Chiswick, L.; Harries of Pentregarth, L.; Haskins, L.; Hayman, B.; Hennessy of Nympsfield, L.; Hogg, B.; Howarth of Breckland, B.; Howe of Idlicote, B.; Janvrin, L.; Jay of Ewelme, L.; Kakkar, L.; Kerr of Kinlochard, L.; Kidron, B.; Krebs, L.; Laming, L.; Low of Dalston, L.; Manningham-Buller, B.; Mogg, L.; Morgan of Drefelin, B.; Moser, L.; Murphy, B.; Neuberger, B.; O'Donnell, L.; O'Neill of Bengarve, B.; Ouseley, L.; Pannick, L.; Prashar, B.; Richardson of Calow, B.; Stern of Brentford, L.; Stern, B.; Stevenson of Coddenham, L.; Trees, L.; Walker of Gestingthorpe, L.; Warnock, B.; Williams of Baglan, L.; Wilson of Tillyorn, L.; Woolf, L.; Wright of Richmond, L.; Young of Hornsey, B.	–
Liberal Democrats	2: Metheuen, L; Nicholson of Winterbourne, B	73: Addington, L.; Allan of Hallam, L.; Avebury, L.; Barker, B.; Benjamin, B.; Bonham-Carter of Yarnbury, B.; Brinton, B.; Burnett, L.; Carlile of Berriew, L.; Chidgey, L.; Clement-Jones, L.; Dholakia, L.; Doocey, B.; Dykes, L.; Falkner of Margravine, B.; Garden of Frognal, B.; German, L.; Goodhart, L.; Greaves, L.; Hamwee, B.; Harris of Richmond, B.; Hussein-Ece, B.; Jolly, B.; Jones of Cheltenham, L.; Kramer, B.; Lee of Trafford, L.; Linklater of Butterstone, B.; Loomba, L.; Macdonald of River Glaven, L.; Maclennan of Rogart, L.; McNally, L.; Maddock, B.; Mar and Kellie, E.; Marks of Henley-on-Thames, L.; Miller of Chilthorne Domer, B.; Newby, L. [Teller]; Northover, B.; Oakeshott of Seagrove Bay, L.; Palmer of Childs Hill, L.; Parminter, B.; Phillips of Sudbury, L.; Randerson, B.; Razzall, L.; Redesdale, L.; Roberts of Llandudno, L.; Rodgers of Quarry Bank, L.; Roper, L.; Scott of Needham Market, B.; Sharkey, L.; Sharp of Guildford, B.; Shipley, L.; Shutt of Greetland, L.; Smith of Clifton, L.; Steel of Aikwood, L.; Stephen, L.; Stoneham of Droxford, L.; Storey, L.; Strasburger, L.; Taverne, L.; Taylor of Goss Moor, L.; Teverson, L.; Thomas of Winchester, B.; Tope, L.; Tordoff, L.; Tyler of Enfield, B.; Tyler, L.; Vallance of Tummel, L.; Wallace of Saltaire, L.; Wallace of Tankerness, L.; Walmsley, B.; Watson of Richmond, L.; Williams of Crosby, B.; Willis of Knaresborough, L.	–
Bishops	9: Birmingham; Bristol; Canterbury; Chester; Coventry; Exeter; Hereford; London; Winchester	–	15: Bath and Wells; Derby; Gloucester; Guildford; Lichfield; Liverpool; Newcastle; Norwich; Oxford; Ripon and Leeds; St Edmundsbury and Ipswich; Truro; Wakefield; Worcester; York
Non-affiliated	3: Kalms, L.; Maginnis of Drumglass, L.; Taylor of Warwick, L.	4: Cunningham of Felling, L.; Smith of Finsbury, L.; Uddin, B.; Young of Old Scone, B.	–
DUP	2: Browne of Belmont, L; Morrow, L	–	–
UUP	1: Empey, L	–	–
UKIP	2: Pearson of Rannoch, L; Willoughby de Broke, L	–	–
Plaid Cymru	–	2: Elis-Thomas, L.; Wigley, L.	–
Independent Labour	1: Stoddart of Swindon, L	1: Rooker, L.	–
Independent Liberal Democrat	–	1: Tonge, B.	–
Total	148	390	78

==== Committee stage ====
The bill underwent its Committee Stage in the House of Lords on 17, 19 and 24 June 2013. A number of government amendments to the Bill were agreed during the Committee Stage:

- Clause 5 was amended to detail the relevant governing authorities for giving consent to same-sex marriages according to the rights and usages of the Jewish religion;
- Schedule 7 would now also amend the Marriage Act 1949 to make clear that a same-sex marriage carried out by the Church of England, or by a religious organisation that had not opted in to solemnising same sex marriages would be void;
- Schedule 7 would now also amend the Public Order Act 1986. Part 3A of the 1986 Act prohibits stirring up hatred against people based on their sexual orientation. Part 3A would be amended to make clear that any discussion or criticism of marriage which concerns the sex of the parties to marriage shall not be taken of itself to be threatening or intended to stir up hatred.

==== Report stage ====
The bill underwent its Report Stage in the House of Lords on 8 and 10 July 2013. A number of government amendments to the Bill were agreed during the Report Stage:

- Clause 2 was amended to define more specifically what is meant by the term "compelled";
- Schedule 5 was amended to provide for a new fast-track procedure for granting applications for gender recognition for those in protected marriages who transitioned over six years ago;
- A new clause was inserted which would allow the government to make secondary legislation permitting belief-based organisations (such as humanists) to solemnise marriages, following a public consultation.

==== Third reading ====
The bill had its Third Reading on 15 July 2013, and was passed by a simple voice vote.

The amended Bill returned to the House of Commons for approval of the amendments on 16 July 2013, which the House approved on the same day.

=== Royal Assent ===
On 17 July 2013, the Bill was granted Royal Assent by Queen Elizabeth II, thereby becoming the Marriage (Same Sex Couples) Act 2013.

== Commencement ==
=== 17 July 2013: Royal Assent ===
Sections 15, 16 and 21 came into force on the day the act received Royal Assent, 17 July 2013. The remaining, substantive provisions of the act were brought into force by statutory instruments made by the Secretary of State.

=== 31 October 2013: Power to Make Subordinate Legislation ===
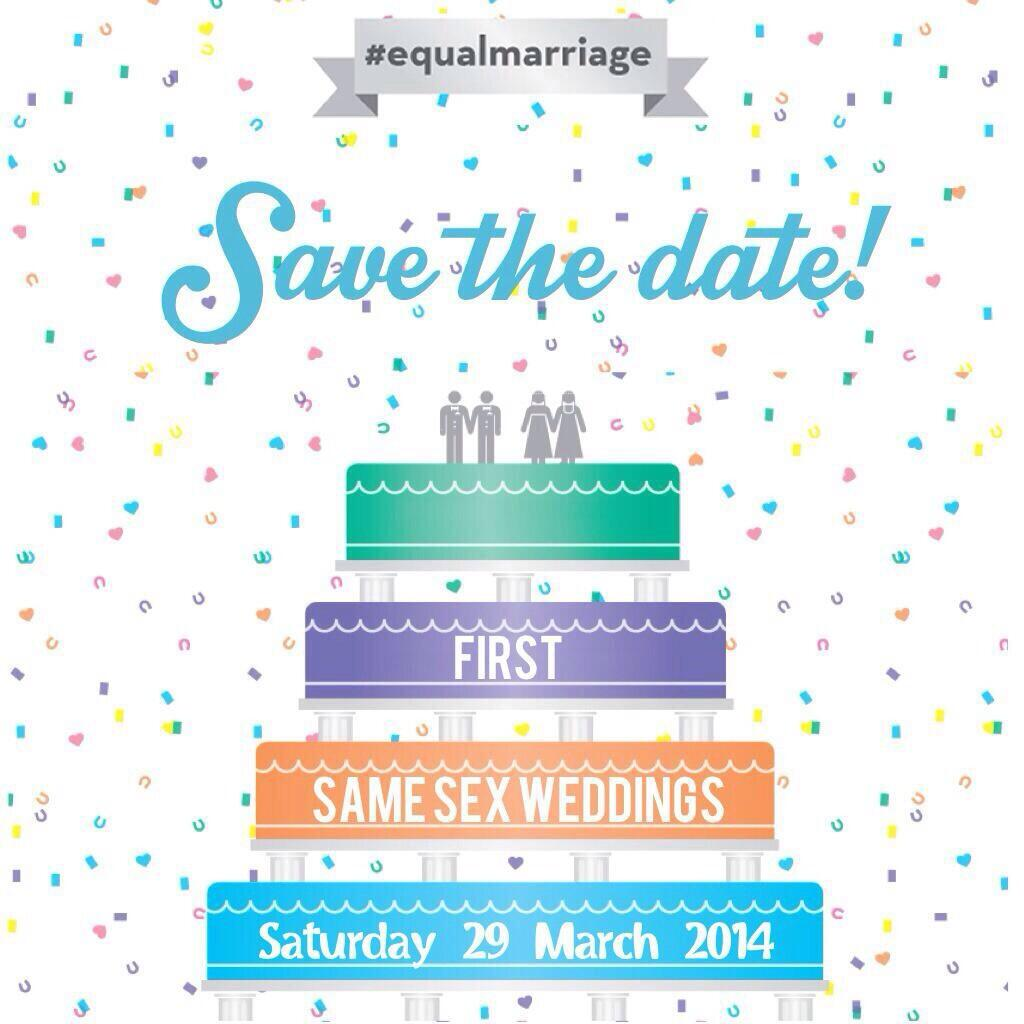
Date for introduction of same sex marriage in England and Wales

The Marriage (Same Sex Couples) Act 2013 (Commencement No. 1) Order 2013 brought into force various provisions of the act on 31 October 2013:

- Section 4 and schedule 1 but only to the extent that these provisions conferred or related to the power to make subordinate legislation. Section 4 and schedule 1 allow religious organisations to perform same sex marriages if they opt in to do so. Subordinate legislation was required to provide details on the application procedure for religious buildings to register to conduct same-sex marriages;
- Paragraphs 5, 8 and 14 of schedule 4 but only to the extent that these provisions conferred or related to the power to make subordinate legislation. Paragraphs 5 and 8 amended the Domicile and Matrimonial Proceedings Act 1973 to set out the jurisdiction of courts in proceedings for orders relating to the ending of a marriage (divorce, judicial separation, nullity of marriage or because one of the couple is dead) and orders relating to declarations of validity of the marriage. Subordinate legislation was required to set out the jurisdiction of the courts to deal with divorce, judicial separation and nullity cases and about the recognition of such orders for a married same-sex couple where one of the couple is or has been habitually resident in a member state of the European Union (EU), or is an EU national, or is domiciled in a part of the UK or the Republic of Ireland. The subordinate legislation brought the jurisdiction in line with that contained within EU law which applies to opposite-sex couples. Paragraph 14 amended the Social Security Contributions and Benefits Act 1992 so that subordinate legislation could be made to provide a particular retirement benefit – the graduated retirement benefit – is available to surviving spouses in same-sex marriages in the same way it is available to widows, widowers and surviving civil partners;
- Section 14;
- Sections 17(1) to (3);
- Sections 18, 19 and 20;
- Paragraphs 1 and 2(2) of schedule 2. Paragraphs 1 and 2(2) allow for subordinate legislation to be made which provides that same-sex marriages conducted in England and Wales are to be recognised in Scotland (until same-sex marriage is permitted in Scotland) and Northern Ireland as civil partners; and
- Paragraphs 27(3) and (4) of schedule 4. Paragraphs 27(3) and (4) allow for subordinate legislation to be made which contains exceptions to the equivalence in law between opposite-sex marriages and same-sex marriages.

=== 21 January 2014: Power to Make Subordinate Legislation ===
The Marriage (Same Sex Couples) Act 2013 (Commencement No. 2 and Transitional Provision) Order 2014 brought into force a number of provisions for the purposes of making secondary legislation on 21 January 2014:

- Section 6 (marriages in naval, military and air force chapels); and
- Schedule 6 (marriages overseas).

=== 13 March 2014: Same-Sex Marriage ===
The Marriage (Same Sex Couples) Act 2013 (Commencement No. 2 and Transitional Provision) Order 2014 brought into force the vast majority of the provisions which allowed same-sex couples to marry on 13 March 2014. As the law requires couples to wait at least 16 days after giving notice to the local register office before a marriage ceremony can take place, the first marriages took place on 29 March 2014. An exception was where the Registrar General has waived the notice period because one member of the couple was seriously ill and not expected to recover. Such marriages could take place at any time after 13 March 2014. Same-sex couples who married abroad under foreign law and who were previously treated as civil partners were recognised as married as of 13 March 2014. The provisions which came into force on 13 March 2014 were:

- Sections 1 to 5;
- Sections 7 and 8;
- Sections 10(1) and (2);
- Section 11;
- The remainder of Schedule 1;
- The remainder of Schedule 2;
- Schedule 3;
- Schedule 4 (with some minor exceptions); and
- Schedule 7 (with some minor exceptions).

=== 29 March 2014: Marriage Ceremonies ===
The first same-sex marriages took place on 29 March 2014.

=== 3 June 2014: Marriage in British Consulates in Armed Forces Bases Overseas and in Military Chapels ===
The Marriage (Same Sex Couples) Act 2013 (Commencement No. 2 and Transitional Provision) Order 2014 brought into force a number of provisions on 3 June 2014 which allow same-sex couples to marry in certain British consulates in armed forces bases overseas, and potentially allow for same-sex marriages in military chapels. The provisions which came into force on 3 June 2014 were:

- The remainder of section 6;
- Section 13;
- The remainder of schedule 6; and
- Minor provisions within schedule 7.

=== 10 December 2014: Conversion of Civil Partnerships and Marriage of Transgender Persons ===
The Marriage (Same Sex Couples) Act 2013 (Commencement No. 4) Order 2014 brought into force all remaining provisions of the act on 10 December 2014, those including the provisions which allow for couples in a civil partnership to convert their civil partnership into a marriage (section 9) and for individuals in a marriage or a civil partnership to change their gender without first needing to divorce or dissolve the civil partnership (section 12 and schedule 5).

=== UK Crown Dependencies and Territories ===
Same-sex marriage is legal within Cayman Islands (subject to appeal), Isle of Man, Indian Ocean Territory, British Antarctic Territory, Akrotiri and Dhekelia (UK Military personnel only), Saint Helena, Ascension and Tristan da Cunha, South Georgia and the South Sandwich Islands, Gibraltar, Channel Islands, Pitcairn Islands and the Falkland Islands.

- Recognition of same-sex unions in the British Overseas Territories

== Aftermath ==
In 2013, it was claimed that the Conservative Party lost an estimated 35–40% of its membership due to the Same Sex Marriage Bill. Despite this claim, the Conservatives won the 2015 UK General Election with their first outright majority since 1992.

== See also ==
- Timeline of same-sex marriage
- Same-sex marriage in the United Kingdom
- Marriage and Civil Partnership (Scotland) Act 2014
