= FOBT =

FOBT may refer to:

- Faecal occult blood test, used to detect colon cancer and other disease
- Fixed odds betting terminal, an electromechanical gambling machine
