= Social value =

Social value may refer to:

- Social dimensions of value (ethics)
- The UK's Public Services (Social Value) Act 2012
