= Ilora Finlay, Baroness Finlay of Llandaff =

Welsh medical doctor (born 1949)

The Right Honourable The Baroness Finlay of Llandaff FRCP FRCGP FMedSci FLSW
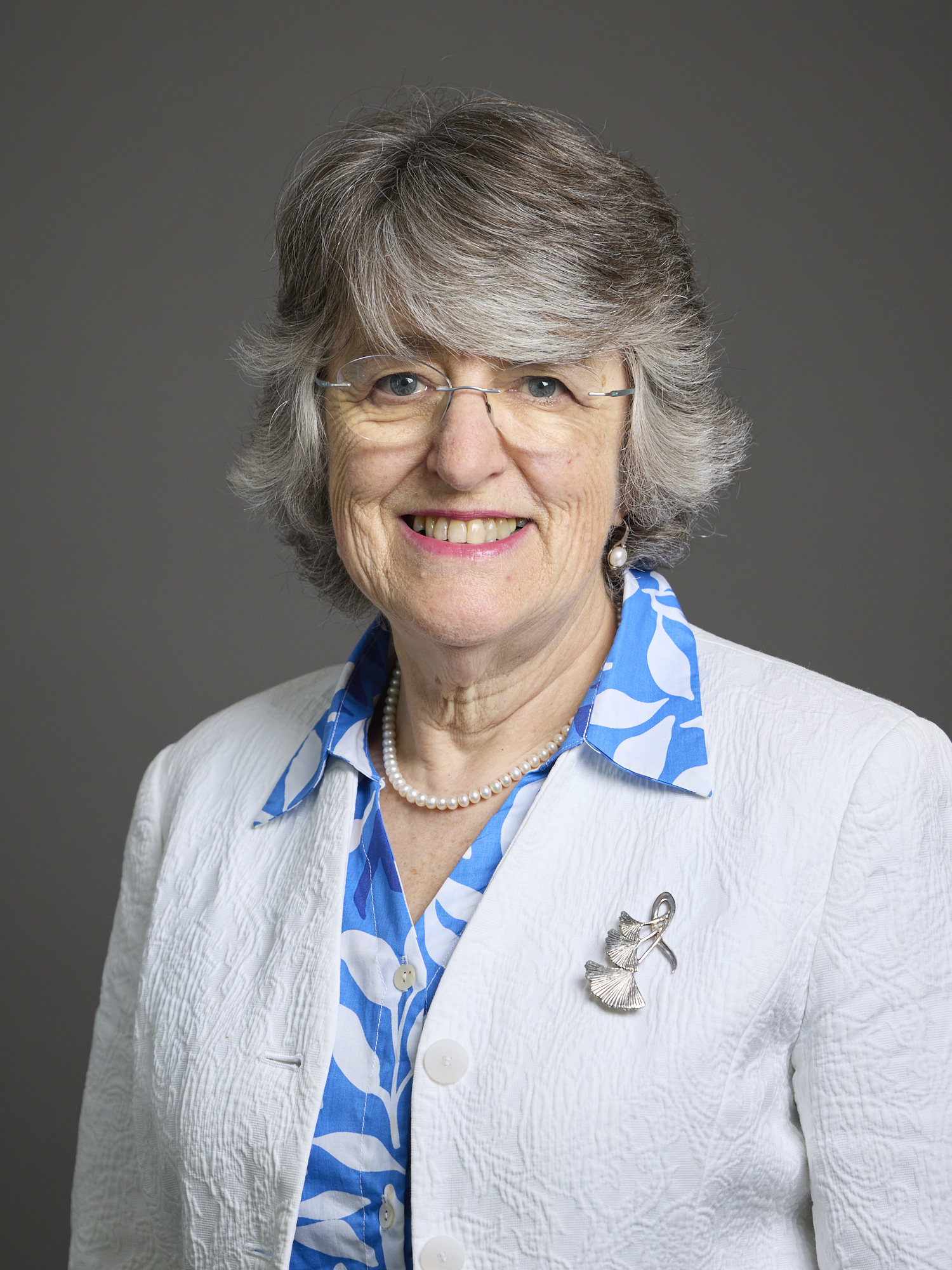
- Official portrait, 2026

Member of the House of Lords
- Lord Temporal
- Life peerage 28 June 2001

Personal details
- Born: 23 February 1949 (age 77)
- Party: None (crossbencher)

Ilora Gillian Finlay, Baroness Finlay of Llandaff, FRCP, FRCGP, FLSW, FMedSci (born 23 February 1949) is a Welsh doctor, professor of palliative medicine, and a crossbench member of the House of Lords.

Born the only daughter of Professor Charles Beaumont Benoy Downman, Finlay grew up in outer London. She attended Wimbledon High School before studying medicine at St Mary's University, Twickenham. In 1972 she married Andrew Yule Finlay, with whom she has two children.

== Career ==
Finlay became the first Consultant in Palliative Medicine in Wales in 1987. She was President of the Royal Society of Medicine from 2006 to 2008. She is a professor of palliative medicine at Cardiff University School of Medicine, and is consultant at the Velindre Cancer Centre in Cardiff. On 28 June 2001, she was made a life peer as Baroness Finlay of Llandaff, of Llandaff in the County of South Glamorgan.

In 2003 she proposed a bill to ban smoking in public buildings in Wales, three years before it was eventually implemented.

In 2007, Lady Finlay introduced a private members bill seeking to change the current system of organ donation from 'opt in' to 'opt out'. Parliamentary timing did not allow for this bill to proceed but the principle continues to be debated. Two years later she succeeded in changing government policy on organ donation to allow potential organ donors to be able to specify a family member or close friend to whom they wish to donate their organ(s).

In March 2010, Baroness Finlay sponsored the Sunbeds (Regulation) Bill as it reached the House of Lords for scrutiny. With just weeks before the forthcoming general election, Baroness Finlay, with Government and Opposition front bench support, took the MP Julie Morgan's private members bill through its final stages, to Royal Assent.

Baroness Finlay is a co-chair of the All-Party Parliamentary Carbon Monoxide Group, which brings together parliamentarians committed to tackling carbon monoxide poisoning. In October 2011, following a six-month inquiry which she chaired, the Group produced a report entitled Preventing Carbon Monoxide Poisoning, including a number of recommendations for policy and behaviour change. Lady Finlay also chairs the All-Party Parliamentary Group on Dying Well, which promotes palliative care.

She is a Vice President of Marie Curie, Patron of The Trussell Trust's foodbank network in Wales, and the Motor Neurone Disease Association. She is also patron of Student Volunteering Cardiff She was a Founding Fellow of the Learned Society of Wales and is a Member of its inaugural Council. She is patron of the award-winning charity Students for Kids International Projects (1099804).

In 2014 she was appointed as president of the British Medical Association.

In 2017, she was appointed one of two patrons of the Royal Microscopical Society, the other being fellow member of the House of Lords, Baroness Brown of Cambridge.

In 2020, Finlay served as chairwoman of the Alcohol Harms Commission, which recommended that England establish a minimum unit price for alcohol.

In February 2025, Baroness Finlay was appointed as Honorary President of Cardiff Male Choir

She is a longstanding opponent of any change in the law on assisted dying.

== Awards ==
Finlay was named the Welsh Woman of the Year in 1996.

In 2007 she was awarded the ePolitix Charity Champion Award for her work as a patron with the Shalom House Trust.

In 2008 the Dods and Scottish Widows Women in Public Life Awards named her Peer of the Year.

In 2014 the Livery Company of Wales’ awarded Finlay their outstanding achievement award. She was elected a Fellow of the Academy of Medical Sciences in the same year.

In March 2015, Finlay was awarded the Grassroot Diplomat Initiative Honouree for her vigorous campaigning to improve the care of dying patients.

== Arms ==
Coat of arms of Ilora Finlay, Baroness Finlay of Llandaff
Adopted 2006 Coronet Coronet of a Baroness Escutcheon Gyronny Azure and Sable upon a roundel Argent a roundel invected of eight points Gules charged with a mullet ribbed of eight points throughout Argent. Supporters On either side a unicorn Argent armed and unguled Or gorged with a plain collar attached thereto a line reflexed over the back and terminating in a ring Gules. Motto Proficere Per Caritatem Badge A roundel invected of eight points Gules charged with a mullet of eight points throughout gyronny Argent and Or. Symbolism The roundel and mullet arrangement suggests a poppy seed case viewed head on. This represents morphine and its treatment of pain, the latter being the speciality of Baroness Finlay of Llandaff. The poppy seed case is placed upon a background of black and blue which is a further allusion to pain as are the unicorns. The unicorn's horn was anciently considered to be an all heal.

== See also ==
List of Welsh medical pioneers
