= Rebecca Earle =

British historian (born 1964)

- Born: 1964 (age 61–62)
- Education: Bryn Mawr College; University of Warwick
- Occupations: Historian, university teacher, mathematician, art historian, Germanist
- Employer: University of Warwick
- Awards: Fellow of the British Academy (2020)

Rebecca Earle FBA (born 1964) is a historian, specialising in the history of food and colonial and 19th-century Spanish America. She is a professor in the Department of History at the University of Warwick. She is married to Matt Western, MP for Warwick and Leamington.

== Biography ==
Earle completed her undergraduate studies at Bryn Mawr College in 1986. She then undertook three successive post-graduate degrees at the University of Warwick: MSc in Maths (1987), MA in history (1990), and PhD in history (1994). In 2017–2018, Earle was a Fellow at the Swedish Collegium for Advanced Study in Uppsala, Sweden.

Her 2008 book The Return of the Native: Indians and Mythmaking in Spanish America, 1810-1930 was awarded an Honorable Mention in the 2008 Bolton-Johnson Prize by the Conference on Latin American History. Earle's 2013 book The Body of the Conquistador. Food, Race, and the Colonial Experience in South America, 1492-1700 won the prize outright in 2013.

Earle has written articles about food history for The Independent, The Conversation, BBC History Magazine, and The Sunday Telegraph.

Earle was elected as a Fellow of the British Academy in 2020.

She is a member of the Editorial Board for Past & Present. She is also a Fellow of the Royal Historical Society.

== Select publications ==
- Feeding the People: The Politics of the Potato (Cambridge University Press, 2020) ISBN 9781108484060
- The Body of the Conquistador: Food, Race and the Colonial Experience in Spanish America, 1492-1700 (Cambridge University Press, 2012) ISBN 9781107693296
- The Return of the Native: Indians and Mythmaking in Spanish America, 1810-1930 (Duke University Press, 2008) ISBN 9780822340843
- Spain and the Independence of Colombia (University of Exeter Press, 2000) ISBN 9780859896122
  - España y la independencia de Colombia, Banco de la República (Bogotá, 2014).
