= Foreign Marriage Act 1892 =

Act of the Parliament of the United Kingdom recognising marriages abroad

Foreign Marriage Act 1892 (Note: Section 27.)
- Act of Parliament
- Parliament of the United Kingdom
- Long title: An Act to consolidate Enactments relating to the Marriage of British Subjects outside the United Kingdom.
- Citation: 55 & 56 Vict. c. 23
- Territorial extent: United Kingdom

Dates
- Royal assent: 27 June 1892
- Commencement: 1 January 1893 (Note: Section 25.)
- Repealed: England and Wales and Scotland: 3 June 2014; Scotland; Northern Ireland: 13 January 2020
Other legislation
Amends	Naturalization Act 1870
Repeals/revokes	Marriages Confirmation Act 1823; Consular Marriage Act 1849; Consular Marriage Act 1868
Amended by	Perjury Act 1911; Family Law Reform Act 1969; Marriage (Scotland) Act 1977; Statute Law (Repeals) Act 1986; Foreign Marriage (Amendment) Act 1988
Repealed by	England and Wales and Scotland: Marriage (Same Sex Couples) Act 2013; Northern Ireland: Marriage (Same-sex Couples) and Civil Partnership (Opposite-sex Couples) (Northern Ireland) Regulations 2019

Status: Repealed

Status
- England and Wales: Repealed
- Scotland: Repealed
- Republic of Ireland: Amended
- Northern Ireland: Repealed

Text of statute as originally enacted

Revised text of statute as amended

The Foreign Marriage Act 1892 (55 & 56 Vict. c. 23) was an act of the Parliament of the United Kingdom, enacted to provide legal authority for marriages of British subjects performed outside the United Kingdom. It authorised British officials abroad to perform the marriage ceremony, and set out the necessary formalities to be followed, such as notice requirements and registration of the marriage with the British government. Marriages performed under the act would then be recognised under British law as if they had been performed in the United Kingdom. The act also provided that marriages performed abroad under local laws could be registered with the British government, provided a British consular official personally witnessed the marriage.

When originally enacted in 1892, the act applied to all of Great Britain and Ireland. It was repealed in 2013 for England, Wales, and Scotland, while repealed in 2019 for Northern Ireland, though the act is still in force in the Republic of Ireland.

== Content ==
Until their repeal, sections of the act also defined the procedures used for consular marriages, which until recently – with the abolition of extraterritoriality for British subjects abroad or within the British Empire, the obsolescence of the class of the British Protected Person and the development of the concept of Lex loci celebrationis and the qualifications for its invocation (especially by the case of Radwan v Radwan (1972) (3 All ER 967), which effectively rendered foreign and Commonwealth consular marriages and British consular marriages alike invalid in England) in English law – allowed British subjects to get married abroad but under the matrimonial laws of England rather than foreign laws, through the British consul-general, consul, consulate or consular section.

The act also defined the procedures for marriage by members of Her Majesty's Armed Forces in the United Kingdom outside of the United Kingdom.

=== Repealed enactments ===
Section 26(1) of the act repealed 6 enactments, listed in the schedule to the act.

Citation	Short title	Description	Extent of repeal
4 Geo. 4. c. 91	Marriages Confirmation Act 1823	An Act to relieve His Majesty's subjects from all doubt concerning the validity of certain marriages solemnized abroad.	The whole act, so far as unrepealed.
12 & 13 Vict. c. 68	Consular Marriage Act 1849	The Consular Marriage Act, 1849.	The whole act.
31 & 32 Vict. c. 61	Consular Marriage Act 1868	The Consular Marriage Act, 1868.	The whole act.
33 & 34 Vict. c. 14	Naturalization Act 1870	The Naturalization Act, 1870.	In section eleven, the words, " and of the " marriages of per" sons married at " any of Her Majesty's embassies " or legations."
53 & 54 Vict. c. 47.	Marriage Act 1890	The Marriage Act, 1890.	The whole act.
54 & 55 Vict. c. 74	Foreign Marriage Act 1891	The Foreign Marriage Act, 1891.	The whole act.

== Amendments and repeal ==
The act was substantially amended by the Foreign Marriage (Amendment) Act 1988.

The act was repealed in England and Wales the Marriage (Same-Sex Couples) Act 2013, which came into force on 3 June 2014. The act was also repealed in Scotland. The repeal did not extend to Northern Ireland. The act was repealed in Northern Ireland by the Marriage (Same-sex Couples) and Civil Partnership (Opposite-sex Couples) (Northern Ireland) Regulations 2019, which came into force on 13 January 2020.

The act is still in force in the Republic of Ireland, as originally enacted and containing references to "British", "the United Kingdom", "England", "the Church of England" and "British subjects". The act is considered obsolete.

Marriages overseas are now provided in schedule 6 of the Marriage (Same-Sex Couples) Act 2013.

== See also ==
- Marriage in the United Kingdom
- Legal consequences of marriage and civil partnership in England and Wales
