= All-Party Parliamentary Carbon Monoxide Group =

UK parliamentary group

All-Party Parliamentary Carbon Monoxide Group (APPCOG)
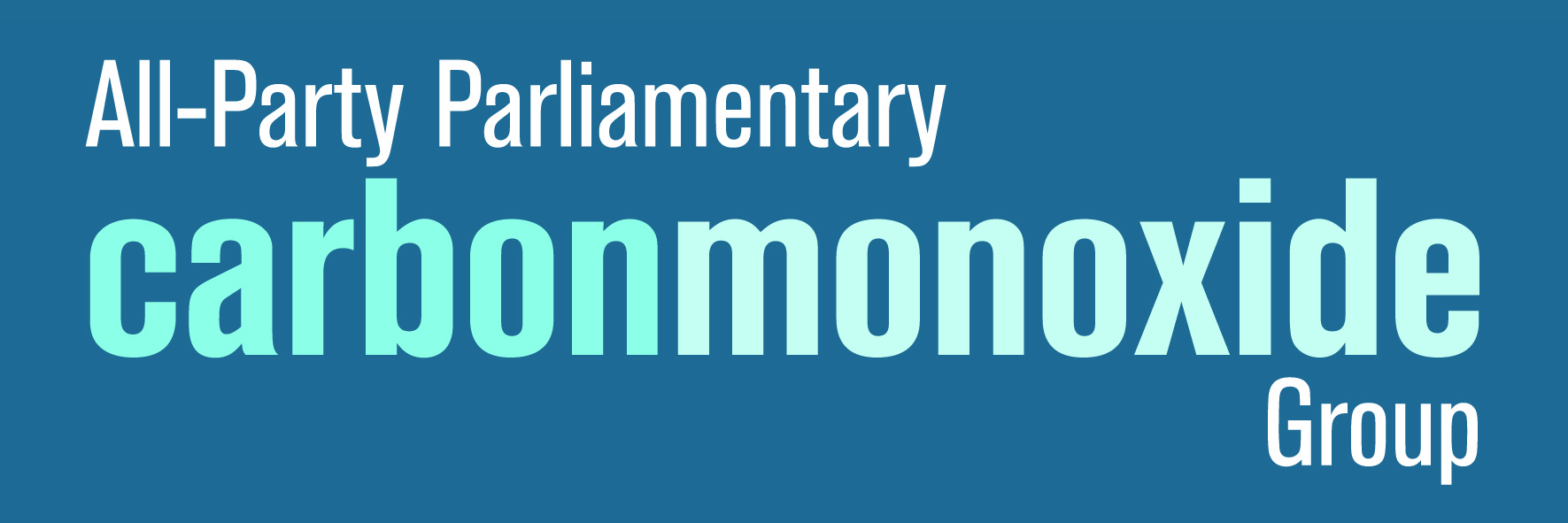
- Legal status: Official All-Party Parliamentary Group
- Location: London
- Website: APPCOG website

The All-Party Parliamentary Carbon Monoxide Group (APPCOG) is an official All-Party Parliamentary Group of the UK Parliament, chaired by Paul Davies MP. The group exists to tackle carbon monoxide (CO) poisoning in the UK, improve government policy around CO safety, and raise public awareness of the threat posed by toxic CO gas.

As of 2025, alongside the chair, the APPCOG has three Parliamentary officers and members from across the Labour, Conservative, Liberal Democrat, Scottish National, Green and Democratic Unionist parties. Its official entry on the Houses of Parliament register can be found on the APPG Register.

Its secretariat services are provided by Policy Connect, an independent not-for-profit think tank based in London.

== History ==
The APPCOG, originally named the All-Party Parliamentary Gas Safety Group, was first established to promote awareness of CO poisoning and provide a forum for Parliamentarians, civil servants, industry representatives, charities and emergency services to share information and collaborate in order to improve gas safety.

In July 2012, the group was renamed to the All-Party Parliamentary Carbon Monoxide Group, which better reflected how CO can be produced by a variety of fuels, not just conventional gas.

== Events, Research and Campaigning ==
The APPCOG holds regular events in Parliament, designed to bring together relevant stakeholders and discuss key issues within the field of carbon monoxide safety.

The APPCOG also conducts research and produces evidence-based reports designed to advise government departments on policy making around CO safety, with a particular focus on the Ministry of Housing, Communities and Local Government, the Department for Work and Pensions, and the Department for Business, Energy and Industrial Strategy.

=== Preventing Carbon Monoxide Poisoning ===
In October 2011, the APPCOG produced Preventing Carbon Monoxide Poisoning, which compiled evidence collected across a six-month inquiry and set a national strategy to eradicate CO poisoning through preventative measures such as providing CO alarms.

=== Carbon Monoxide: From Awareness to Action ===
In April 2014, the APPCOG announced it was undertaking a follow-up to the 2011 Inquiry, including a focus on behavioural insights and nudge theory. In January 2015, the ensuing report - Carbon Monoxide: From Awareness to Action - recommended a more targeted strategy for raising awareness of CO in order to reduce deaths and injuries.

=== Carbon Monoxide Poisoning: Saving lives, advancing treatment ===
In October 2017, the APPCOG's medical subgroup COMed published Carbon Monoxide Poisoning: Saving lives, advancing treatment . This report brought together a range of medical experts and made over twenty recommendations to improve the diagnosis and treatment of CO poisoning.

=== Carbon Monoxide Alarms: Tenants safe and secure in their homes ===
In November 2017, the APPCOG released Carbon Monoxide Alarms: Tenants safe and secure in their homes. The report advocated that landlords should be required to install CO alarms in all properties with a fuel-burning appliance.

== Parliamentary Members ==
Conservative	Liberal Democrat	Labour	Scottish National	Democratic Unionist	Crossbench
Maria Miller MP	Baroness Maddock	Barry Sheerman MP	John McNally MP	Jim Shannon MP	Baroness Finlay of Llandaff
Eddie Hughes MP		Luke Pollard MP			
		Alex Cunningham MP			
		Liz Twist MP			

== See also ==
- All-Party Parliamentary Group
- Carbon Monoxide
- Carbon monoxide poisoning
- Policy Connect
