= Chatham and Aylesford =

UK Parliament constituency (since 1997)

Coordinates: 51°20′N 0°29′E

- County constituency for the House of Commons
- Interactive map of boundaries from 2024
- Boundary of Chatham and Aylesford in South East England
- County: Kent
- Population: 97,281 (2011 census)
- Electorate: 74,840 (2023)
- Major settlements: Chatham, Walderslade, Larkfield, Snodland

Current constituency
- Created: 1997
- Member of Parliament: Tris Osborne (Labour)
- Seats: One
- Created from: Mid Kent and Tonbridge and Malling

Chatham and Aylesford is a constituency (Note: A county constituency (for the purposes of election expenses and type of returning officer)) in Kent represented in the House of Commons of the UK Parliament since 2024 by Tris Osborne of the Labour Party. (Note: As with all constituencies, the constituency elects one Member of Parliament (MP) by the first past the post system of election at least every five years.)

== Constituency profile ==
The Chatham and Aylesford constituency is located in Kent. The Kent Downs runs through the centre of the constituency, dividing it into two populated areas. In the east is the town of Chatham, although the constituency does not include the town centre. In the west is the Medway Gap which includes the small town of Snodland, the villages of New Hythe and Larkfield and the old centre of Aylesford. The Medway area has a long naval history. Parts of Chatham, particularly around Luton, are within the 10% most-deprived areas in England, whilst Walderslade and the west of the constituency are more affluent.

Compared to national averages, residents of the constituency have low levels of education and professional employment and average levels of income. House prices are low compared to the rest of South East England. White people make up 86% of the population. At the local council level, most of the constituency is represented by Labour Party councillors, whilst Walderslade elected Conservatives and New Hythe and Larkfield elected Liberal Democrats. Voters in Chatham and Aylesford were strongly in favour of leaving the European Union in the 2016 referendum, with an estimated 65% voting for Brexit.

== Political history ==
Local voters returned the Labour candidate in the first three elections to 2005 then the Conservative candidate in the four general elections up to and including 2019, then reverted to Labour in 2024, reflecting the winner of the national general election in each case.

The greatest third party share of vote was 24.5% for Reform UK in 2024, followed by 19.9% for the UK Independence Party candidate in 2015. A Liberal Democrat came third in the first four elections reaching a vote share of 15% in 1997.

In June 2016, an estimated 63.9% of local adults voting in the EU membership referendum chose to leave the European Union instead of to remain. This was matched in two January 2018 votes in Parliament by its MP.

== Boundaries ==
1997–2010: The City of Rochester-upon-Medway wards of Holcombe, Horsted, Lordswood, Luton, Walderslade, Wayfield, and Weedswood, and the Borough of Tonbridge and Malling wards of Aylesford, Blue Bell Hill, Burham, Eccles and Wouldham, Ditton, Larkfield North, Larkfield South, Snodland East, and Snodland West.

2010–2024: The Borough of Medway wards of Chatham Central, Lordswood and Capstone, Luton and Wayfield, Princes Park, and Walderslade, and the Borough of Tonbridge and Malling wards of Aylesford, Blue Bell Hill and Walderslade, Burham, Eccles and Wouldham, Ditton, Larkfield North, Larkfield South, Snodland East, and Snodland West.

2024–present: Further to the 2023 periodic review of Westminster constituencies which came into effect for the 2024 general election, the constituency was defined as composing of the following as they existed on 1 December 2020:

- The Borough of Medway wards of: Chatham Central; Lordswood and Capstone; Luton and Wayfield; Princes Park; Rochester South and Horsted; Walderslade.
- The Borough of Tonbridge and Malling wards of: Aylesford North and Walderslade; Burham and Wouldham; Larkfield North; Larkfield South; Snodland East and Ham Hill; Snodland West and Holborough Lakes.

The Medway ward of Rochester South and Horsted was transferred in from Rochester and Strood, offset by the loss of the Tonbridge and Malling wards of Aylesford South and Ditton to the new constituency of Maidstone and Malling.

Following local government boundary reviews in Medway, and Tonbridge and Malling which came into effect in May 2023, the constituency now comprises the following from the 2024 general election:

- The Borough of Medway wards of: Chatham Central & Brompton (majority); Fort Horsted; Fort Pitt (most); Lordswood & Walderslade; Luton; Princes Park; Rochester East & Warren Wood (small part); Wayfield & Weeds Wood; and a very small part of Hempstead & Wigmore.
- The Borough of Tonbridge and Malling wards of: Aylesford North & North Downs (most); Larkfield; Snodland East and Ham Hill; Snodland West and Holborough Lakes; Walderslade.

== Members of Parliament ==
Mid Kent and Tonbridge & Malling prior to 1997

Election	Member	Party
1997	Jonathan Shaw	Labour
2010	Tracey Crouch	Conservative
2024	Tris Osborne	Labour

== Elections ==
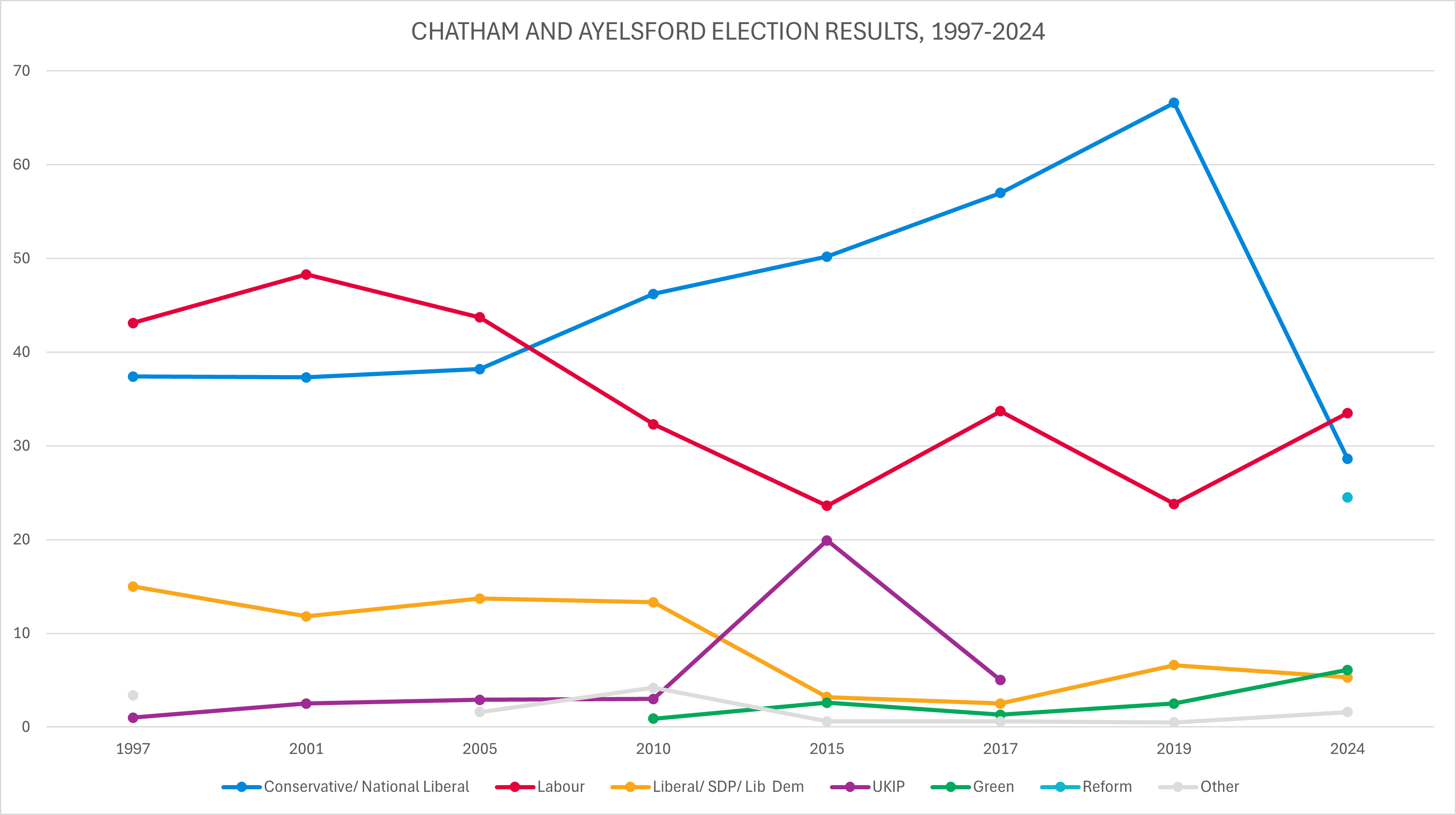
Election results 1950-2024

=== Elections in the 2020s ===
General election 2024: Chatham and Aylesford
Party	Candidate	Votes	%	±%
Labour	Tris Osborne	13,689	33.5	+9.1
Conservative	Nathan Gamester	11,691	28.6	−37.3
Reform	Thomas Mallon	9,989	24.5	N/A
Green	Kim Winterbottom	2,504	6.1	+3.6
Liberal Democrats	Nick Chan	2,175	5.3	−1.4
Workers Party	Matt Valentine	340	0.8	N/A
CPA	Adedotun Ogundemuren	316	0.8	+0.3
SDP	Steven Tanner	141	0.4	N/A
Majority		1,998	4.9	N/A
Turnout		40,845	54.4	–6.8
Registered electors		75,109		
Labour gain from Conservative		Swing	▲23.2	

=== Elections in the 2010s ===
2019 notional result
Party	Vote	%
Conservative	30,183	65.9
Labour	11,191	24.4
Liberal Democrats	3,085	6.7
Green	1,138	2.5
Others	212	0.5
Turnout	45,809	61.2
Electorate	74,840	

General election 2019: Chatham and Aylesford
Party	Candidate	Votes	%	±%
Conservative	Tracey Crouch	28,856	66.6	+9.6
Labour	Vince Maple	10,316	23.8	−9.9
Liberal Democrats	David Naghi	2,866	6.6	+4.1
Green	Geoff Wilkinson	1,090	2.5	+1.2
CPA	John Gibson	212	0.5	−0.1
Majority		18,540	42.8	+19.5
Turnout		43,340	59.1	−4.6
Conservative hold		Swing	+9.7	

General election 2017: Chatham and Aylesford
Party	Candidate	Votes	%	±%
Conservative	Tracey Crouch	25,587	57.0	+6.8
Labour	Vince Maple	15,129	33.7	+10.1
UKIP	Nicole Bushill	2,225	5.0	−14.9
Liberal Democrats	Thomas Quinton	1,116	2.5	−0.7
Green	Bernard Hyde	573	1.3	−1.3
CPA	John-Wesley Gibson	260	0.6	+0.3
Majority		10,458	23.3	−3.3
Turnout		44,963	63.7	+0.9
Conservative hold		Swing	-1.6	

General election 2015: Chatham and Aylesford
Party	Candidate	Votes	%	±%
Conservative	Tracey Crouch	21,614	50.2	+4.0
Labour	Tris Osborne	10,159	23.6	−8.7
UKIP	Ian Wallace	8,581	19.9	+16.9
Liberal Democrats	Thomas Quinton	1,360	3.2	−10.1
Green	Luke Balnave	1,101	2.6	+1.7
CPA	John-Wesley Gibson	133	0.3	New
TUSC	Ivor Riddell	125	0.3	New
Majority		11,455	26.6	+12.7
Turnout		43,073	62.8	+1.2
Conservative hold		Swing	+6.4	

General election 2010: Chatham and Aylesford
Party	Candidate	Votes	%	±%
Conservative	Tracey Crouch	20,230	46.2	+9.4
Labour	Jonathan Shaw	14,161	32.3	−12.7
Liberal Democrats	John McClintock	5,832	13.3	−0.2
BNP	Colin McCarthy-Stewart	1,365	3.1	New
UKIP	Steve Newton	1,314	3.0	0.0
English Democrat	Sean Varnham	400	0.9	−0.8
Green	Dave Arthur	396	0.9	New
Christian	Maureen Smith	109	0.2	New
Majority		6,069	13.9	N/A
Turnout		43,807	61.6	+1.0
Conservative gain from Labour		Swing	+11.1	

=== Elections in the 2000s ===
General election 2005: Chatham and Aylesford
Party	Candidate	Votes	%	±%
Labour	Jonathan Shaw	18,387	43.7	−4.6
Conservative	Anne Jobson	16,055	38.2	+0.9
Liberal Democrats	Debbie Enever	5,744	13.7	+1.9
UKIP	Jeffrey King	1,226	2.9	+0.4
English Democrat	Michael Russell	668	1.6	New
Majority		2,332	5.5	−5.5
Turnout		42,080	59.7	+2.7
Labour hold		Swing	−2.7	

General election 2001: Chatham and Aylesford
Party	Candidate	Votes	%	±%
Labour	Jonathan Shaw	19,180	48.3	+5.2
Conservative	Sean Holden	14,840	37.3	−0.1
Liberal Democrats	David Lettington	4,705	11.8	−3.2
UKIP	Gregory Knopp	1,010	2.5	+1.5
Majority		4,340	11.0	+5.3
Turnout		39,735	57.0	−13.6
Labour hold		Swing		

=== Elections in the 1990s ===
General election 1997: Chatham and Aylesford
Party	Candidate	Votes	%	±%
Labour	Jonathan Shaw	21,191	43.1	
Conservative	Richard Knox-Johnston	18,401	37.4	
Liberal Democrats	Robin Murray	7,389	15.0	
Referendum	Keith Riddle	1,538	3.1	
UKIP	Alan Harding	493	1.0	
Natural Law	Timothy Martell	149	0.3	
Majority		2,790	5.7	
Turnout		49,161	70.6	
Labour win (new seat)				

== See also ==
- List of parliamentary constituencies in Kent
- List of parliamentary constituencies in the South East England (region)
