= St Gregory's Catholic School =

Location
- Reynolds Lane; Royal Tunbridge Wells, Kent, TN4 9XL; England; 51°09′00″N 0°15′32″E

Information
- Other name: St Greg's
- Type: Academy
- Religious affiliation: Roman Catholic
- Established: 1966
- Local authority: Kent County Council
- Oversight: Roman Catholic Archdiocese of Southwark
- Trust: Kent Catholic Schools' Partnership
- Department for Education URN: 140640 Tables
- Ofsted: Reports
- Principal: Mike Wilson
- Gender: Mixed
- Age range: 11–18
- Enrolment: 1,184 (2024)
- Colours: Red, White, Blue
- Alumni: Old Gregorians
- Website: www.sgschool.org.uk

St Gregory's Catholic School (often shortened to St Greg's) is an 11–18 mixed, Roman Catholic, secondary school and sixth form with academy status in Royal Tunbridge Wells, Kent, England. It was established in 1966 and is part of the Kent Catholic Schools' Partnership. It is located in the Roman Catholic Archdiocese of Southwark.

== Areas of Learning ==
The school is arranged into five Areas of Learning (AoL). Students are assigned to an Area which they will remain in throughout their school career. This allows them to develop a supportive relationship with their peers and teachers in their Area. Students can move to another Area with good reason and family members may be put into the same Area.

The Areas of Learning are led by an Assistant Headteacher, supported by a Pastoral Leader/Manager. The five Areas are:

1. Communication & Culture (CC) — English, MFL, Film Studies, Media Studies, Drama
2. Creative & Physical Design (CPD) — Art, Music, PE, Technology
3. Ethos & Personal Development (EPD) — RE, Citizenship, PHSE, History
4. Environmental & Scientific Understanding (ESU) — Science (Biology, Chemistry, Physics), Geography
5. Numeracy & Enterprise (NE) — Maths, ICT, Business, Statistics

== Sixth form ==
A range of options are available in the sixth form, including GCE A Level, Applied A levels and BTEC qualifications.

== Notable alumni ==
Alumni of St Gregory's Catholic School are known as Old Gregorians.

- Chris White (b. 1967) - politician
