= Matt Western =

British politician

Matt Western MP
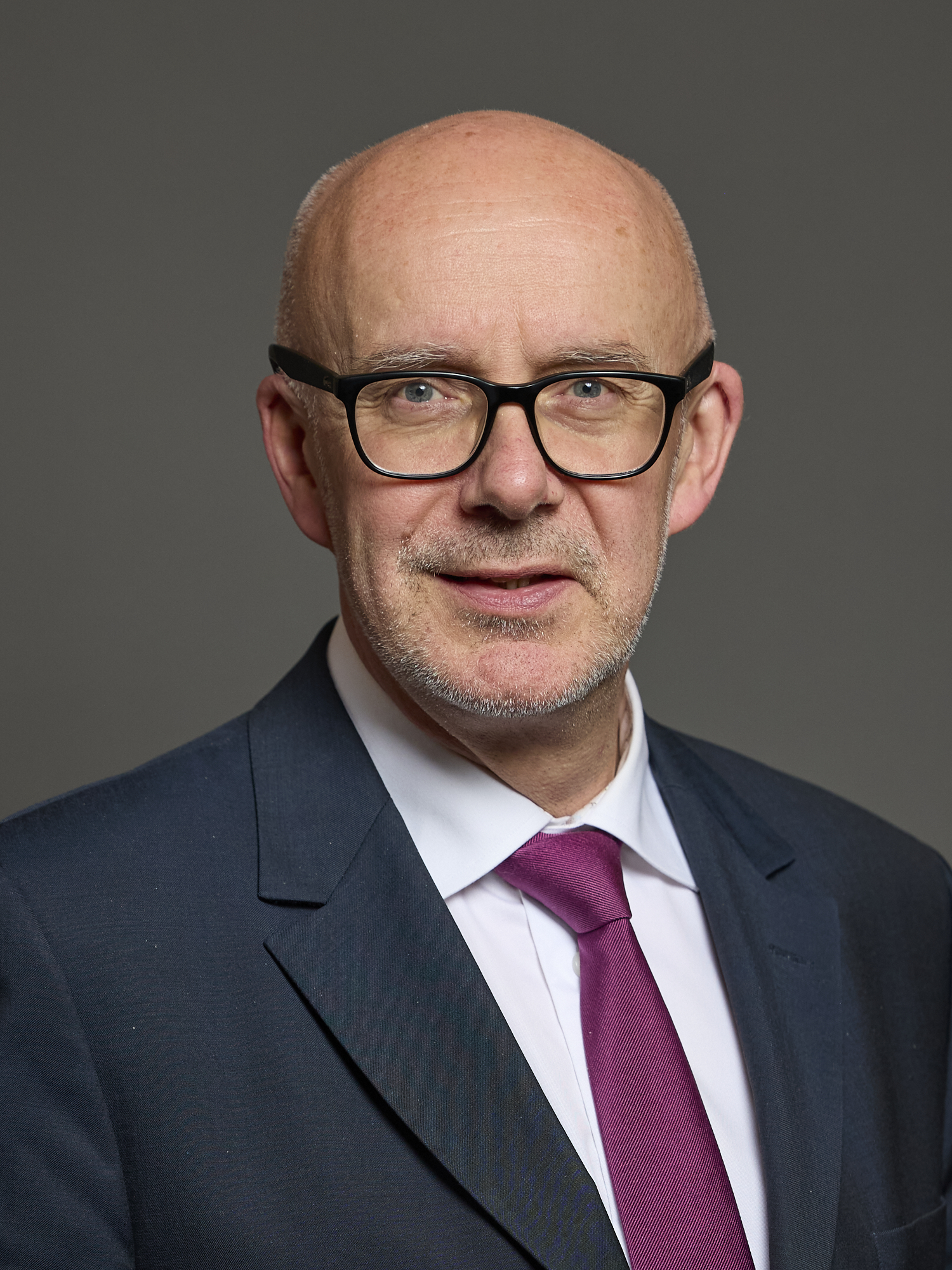
- Official portrait, 2024

Member of Parliament for Warwick and Leamington
- Incumbent
- Assumed office 8 June 2017
- Preceded by: Christopher White
- Majority: 12,412 (25.2%)

Member of Warwickshire County Council for Leamington Willes
- In office 2 May 2013 – 13 March 2018
- Preceded by: Timothy Naylor
- Succeeded by: Helen Adkins

Personal details
- Born: Matthew Raymond Western
- Party: Labour
- Spouse: Rebecca Earle
- Education: University of Bristol (BSc)
- Website: mattwestern.org

Matthew Raymond Western is a British Labour Party politician who has served as Member of Parliament (MP) for Warwick and Leamington since 2017.

== Early life and career ==
Matthew Raymond Western was educated in St Albans, Hertfordshire and was privately educated at St Albans School. He graduated with a Bachelor of Science degree in Geography from the University of Bristol in 1984.

Prior to entering politics, Western worked in various senior management roles during a 24-year career with Peugeot both in the UK and Paris, France. He specialised in Finance, Procurement and Marketing.

== Political career ==
Western entered politics relatively late in life, and was elected to the Leamington Willes ward of Warwickshire County Council for the first time in 2013. Western was elected again in 2017 shortly before becoming an MP. He resigned as a Councillor in March 2018. While a councillor, Western volunteered as a careers mentor at Campion School in Leamington Spa.

Western was elected as Member of Parliament for Warwick and Leamington at the 2017 general election. He was re-elected at the 2019 general election, and the 2024 general election.

As an MP Western has served on the International Trade Select Committee since September 2017 and on the Housing, Communities and Local Government Committee since February 2018. Western is the Chair of the Parliamentary Campaign for Council Housing, which aims to increase the number of council houses being built and represent the interests of council tenants, and is also a member of the All Party Parliamentary Group on Students.

In December 2017, Western criticised the Warwick District Council for a proposal to relocate the council's offices to a new site in Leamington. Western objected to the plans, stating that the new development would consist of "100 per cent private housing, with no social, affordable or council housing on the site". In response to the plans, Western started a petition in protest against the move. As of 3 December 2019, the petition had gained over 8,000 signatures. In September 2019, Warwick District Council leader Andrew Day asked Western to "stop playing political games with the regeneration of town" over Western's opposition to plans to relocate the council's headquarters. However, as a result of Western's petition and a campaign by a local pressure group, the project was put on hold and the private equity backed partner company PSP was withdrawn. Western stated that the scrapped plans would result in Warwick District Council having to pay out £1.2 million in compensation to PSP, even though there was never an official tendering process.

In February 2019, Western proposed a Bill that sought to limit the driving hours worked by bus drivers on local routes. The bill, known as Rowan's Law, was introduced in response to a bus crash in 2015 in Coventry, which killed 76-year-old pedestrian Dora Hancox, and 7-year-old passenger Rowan Fitzgerald from Western's constituency. Driver exhaustion was said to have played a role in the crash, and Rowan's Law sought to prevent any similar future tragedies.

In May 2019, the Sun On Sunday described Western as a "cycling fanatic", reporting that he had claimed expenses for cycling to appointments around his constituency. Western asserted that he was simply "doing the right thing by cycling and not driving" in a town with issues with air quality. Western went on to say that the expenses were "HMRC-approved" and "that cycle mileage claims are considerably less than car mileage claims".

In June 2019, Western led a Parliamentary debate on social housing. The Commons passed his motion calling on the Government to carry out a mass council housebuilding programme.

In August 2019, Western was a signatory to a letter calling on the UN Secretary General António Guterres to intervene and prevent India's revocation of Article 370 regarding the province of Kashmir's self-autonomy. The letter urged "the United Nations to do everything in its power to de-escalate" the situation.

In October 2019, Western was a signatory to a letter calling for the Labour Party to adopt plans to build 100,000 Council Homes, in line with the Labour Campaign for Council Housing's proposals. The policy was later adopted by the Labour Party in its manifesto.

In March 2021, Western was appointed Shadow Minister for Further Education and Universities after Emma Hardy stepped down.

Matt Western stood as the Labour candidate for Warwick and Leamington in the 2024 general election.

== Controversies ==
In December 2020, it emerged that Western had written a foreword to a report at the centre of a climate lobbying controversy. The report claimed that electric vehicles had a poorer carbon footprint than petrol ones. The report purported to be written by an independent organisation, but was in fact written by a PR firm owned by the spouse of a director of Aston Martin. After this emerged, Western said that he was "disappointed that the report has since been used to push an anti-electrification line in the media", and that he "was not aware of any link between the PR firm involved and Aston Martin".

== Policies and views ==
Western has spoken in favour of electric vehicles, and from July 2019, served as Chair of the All-Party Parliamentary Group for Electric Vehicles. Western has described himself as "a big proponent for green energy", but has criticized solar farms in his constituency, arguing that they are "not appropriate."

Western is a signatory of the MPs Not Border Guards pledge, which vows to not report constituents to the Home Office for immigration enforcement.

== Personal life ==
Western is married to Rebecca Earle, a history professor at Warwick University, and they live in Leamington.

Parliament of the United Kingdom
| Preceded by Chris White | Member of Parliament for Warwick and Leamington; 2017–present | Incumbent |
