= Jonathan Shaw (politician) =

British politician (born 1966)

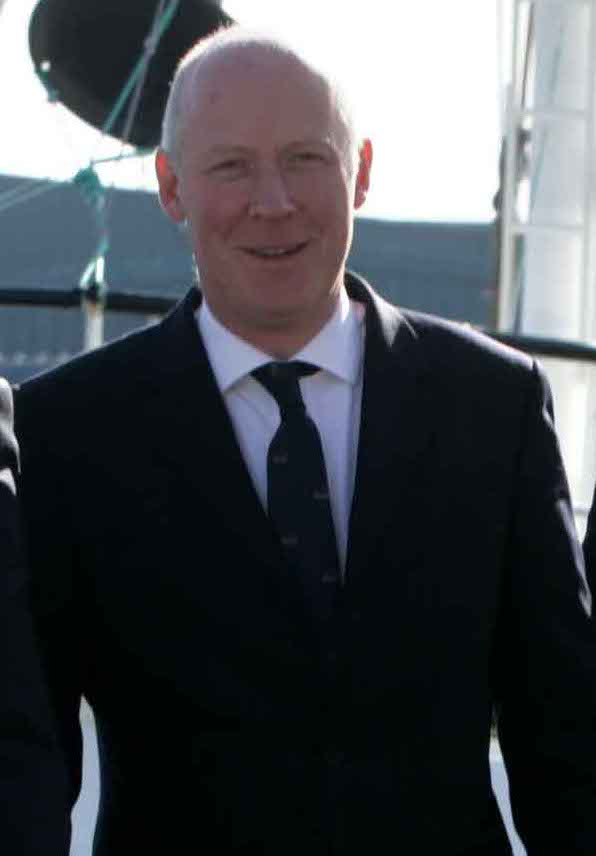
- Shaw in 2007

Minister for the South East
- In office 28 June 2007 – 11 May 2010
- Prime Minister: Gordon Brown
- Preceded by: Office established
- Succeeded by: Office abolished

Minister of State for Disabled People (Note: Parliamentary Under-Secretary of State (2008–09))
- In office 5 October 2008 – 11 May 2010
- Prime Minister: Gordon Brown
- Preceded by: Anne McGuire
- Succeeded by: Maria Miller

Parliamentary Under-Secretary of State for Marine, Landscape and Rural Affairs
- In office 28 June 2007 – 5 October 2008
- Prime Minister: Gordon Brown
- Preceded by: Barry Gardiner
- Succeeded by: Huw Irranca-Davies

Member of Parliament for Chatham and Aylesford
- In office 1 May 1997 – 12 April 2010
- Preceded by: Constituency established
- Succeeded by: Tracey Crouch

Member of Rochester-upon-Medway City Council for Wayfield
- In office 4 May 1995 – 31 March 1998

Personal details
- Born: 3 June 1966 (age 60) Chatham, Kent, England
- Party: Labour

Jonathan Rowland Shaw (born 3 June 1966) is a British Labour Party politician who served as the member of parliament for Chatham and Aylesford from 1997 to 2010. He also served in the Government as the minister for disabled people from 2008 to 2010. He was the CEO of Policy Connect and currently serves on the board. He chairs the Blackthorn Trust.

== Early life ==
Shaw was educated at Vinters Boys' School, West Kent College and Bromley College.

== Parliamentary career ==
A former member of Rochester-upon-Medway City Council, Shaw was first elected to the House of Commons at the 1997 general election; which resulted in a nationwide landslide for the Labour Party. He was re-elected in 2001, with a majority of 4,340 votes and again in 2005; with a reduced majority of 2,332 votes.

Shaw served as Parliamentary Private Secretary to Ruth Kelly as secretary of state for education and skills in 2005–06. He was also an assistant government whip in 2006–07, prior to joining The Department for Environment, Food and Rural Affairs as minister for Fisheries.

Shaw served as a member of the Commons Environmental Audit Select Committee (1997–2001), and the Education and Skills Select Committee (2001–05). In July 2007, Shaw was appointed minister for the South East of England.

Following a cabinet reshuffle in October 2008, Shaw was moved to the DWP, becoming a parliamentary under-secretary of state for work and pensions, and minister for disabled people, replacing Anne McGuire, while retaining his position as minister for the South East.

Shaw lost his seat at the 2010 general election to Tracey Crouch of the Conservative Party. On the BBC Politics Show South East in July 2010, he said that he had withdrawn from public life. Shaw went on to be the chief executive of Policy Connect, an independent, cross-party not-for-profit social enterprise with two decades in policy work.

== Personal life ==
While an MP, Shaw lived in Snodland in his constituency.

== Notes ==
Parliament of the United Kingdom
New constituency	Member of Parliament for Chatham and Aylesford; 1997–2010	Succeeded by Tracey Crouch
Political offices
Preceded by Anne McGuire	Minister for Disabled People; 2008–2010	Succeeded by Maria Miller
