= Policy Connect =

UK-based think tank

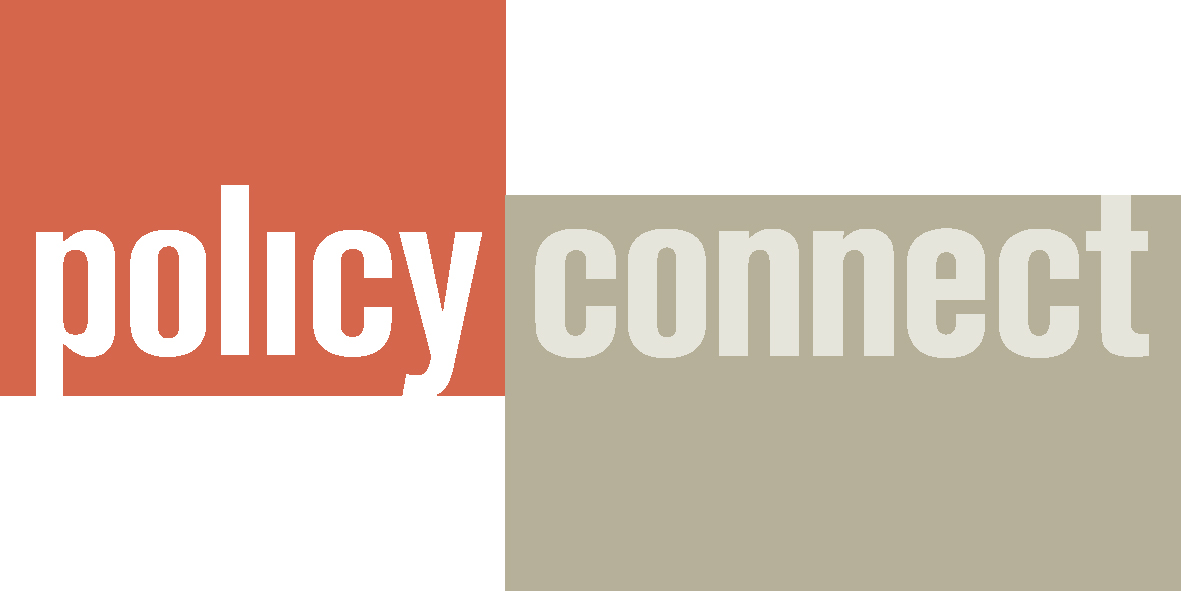
- Formation: 1995; 31 years ago
- Legal status: Not-for-profit
- Headquarters: 32-36 Loman Street, London, United Kingdom, SE1 0EH
- Key people: Barry Sheerman MP (Chairman); Chris White (Vice-Chair); Jonathan Shaw (CEO)
- Website: www.policyconnect.org.uk

Policy Connect is a British cross-party think tank that was founded in 1995 by Labour MP Barry Sheerman. The organization is primarily known for running all-party parliamentary groups.

== Leadership ==
Sheerman is the current chair of the Board of Policy Connect, and Chris White was formerly the vice-chair. Both have been also Co-Chairs of the All-Party Parliamentary Manufacturing Group.

== Organizational structure ==
Policy Connect runs more than 17 political groups for commissions, each working within a different policy field, as well as providing the secretariat to several formal All-Party Parliamentary Groups. As such, the organization has at times been described as a ‘network’ of policy groups. Policy Connect works in five primary policy areas:

=== Sustainability ===
- Westminster Sustainable Business Forum
- All-Party Parliamentary Climate Change Group
- All-Party Parliamentary Sustainable Built Environment
- All-Party Parliamentary Sustainable Resource Group
- Sustainable Resource Forum
- Carbon Connect

=== Manufacturing, Design & Innovation ===
- All-Party Parliamentary Design and Innovation Group
- All-Party Parliamentary Manufacturing Group
- Design Commission
- Manufacturing Commission

=== Energy Safety ===
- All-Party Parliamentary Carbon Monoxide Group

=== Skills & Education ===
- All-Party Parliamentary Group for Skills and Employment
- Skills Commission
- Higher Education Commission

=== Health ===
- All-Party Parliamentary Health Group

== See also ==
- List of think tanks in the United Kingdom
