= Tracey Crouch =

British politician (born 1975)

Dame Tracey Crouch DBE
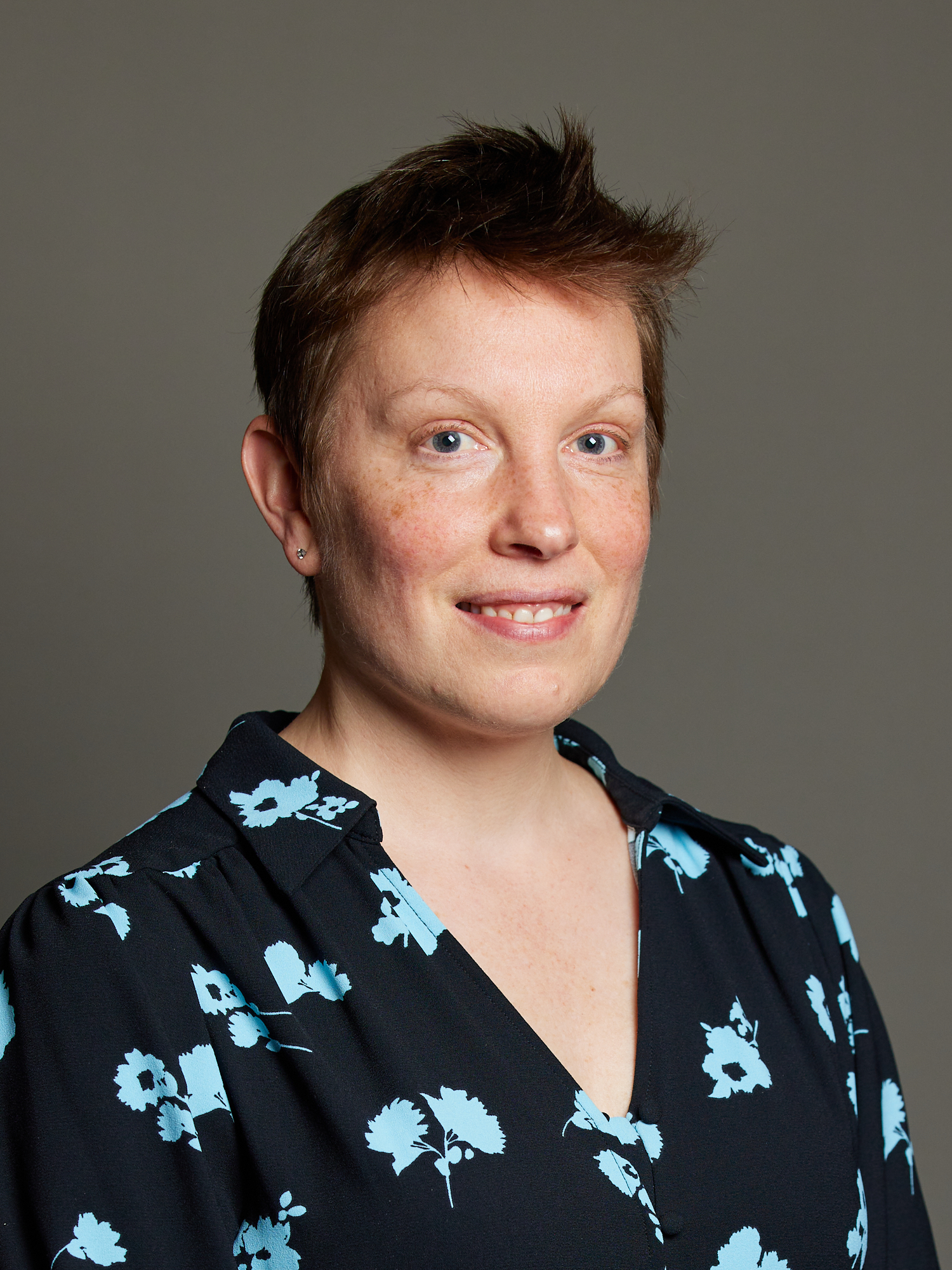
- Official portrait, 2022

Parliamentary Under-Secretary of State for Sport, Civil Society and Loneliness
- In office 15 June 2017 – 1 November 2018
- Prime Minister: Theresa May
- Preceded by: Rob Wilson
- Succeeded by: Mims Davies

Parliamentary Under-Secretary of State for Sport, Heritage and Tourism
- In office 12 May 2015 – 15 June 2017
- Prime Minister: David Cameron; Theresa May
- Preceded by: Helen Grant
- Succeeded by: John Glen

Member of Parliament for Chatham and Aylesford
- In office 6 May 2010 – 30 May 2024
- Preceded by: Jonathan Shaw
- Succeeded by: Tris Osborne

Personal details
- Born: Tracey Elizabeth Anne Crouch; 24 July 1975 (age 51) Ashford, Kent, England
- Party: Conservative
- Spouse: Steve Ladner (m. 2023)
- Children: 1
- Education: University of Hull (LLB)
- Website: traceycrouch.org.uk

Dame Tracey Elizabeth Anne Crouch DBE (born 24 July 1975) is a British Conservative Party politician who served as the Member of Parliament (MP) for Chatham and Aylesford from 2010 to 2024. Crouch was appointed as Minister for Sport, Civil Society and Loneliness in 2017, but resigned in 2018 due to a delay over the introduction of reduced limits on the stakes of fixed odds betting terminals.

== Early life and career ==
Tracey Crouch was born on 24 July 1975 in Ashford, Kent. She was educated at Folkestone School for Girls and graduated from the University of Hull with a bachelor's degree in law and politics in 1996.

Crouch was a parliamentary researcher from 1996 to 1998 before working in PR for Harcourt Public Affairs from 1999 to 2000. She returned to Westminster and held posts as chief of staff to three shadow ministers, including the shadow Home Secretary between 2003 and 2005. Crouch was then employed by the Aviva insurance company where she was the head of public affairs between 2005 and 2010. Before becoming a minister, she coached a junior girls' football team.

== Parliamentary career ==
At the 2010 general election, Crouch was elected to Parliament as the Conservative MP for Chatham and Aylesford with 46.2% of the vote and a majority of 6,069. The Daily Telegraph listed her as one of their "pragmatic, Eurosceptic" new MPs who seeks to "anchor the [Conservative] party to the right of centre".

On 9 December 2010, Crouch abstained in the vote to raise university tuition fees. She was one of two Conservative MPs to abstain, while six voted against the proposals.

Crouch is a vice-chair of the All Party Parliamentary Groups on dementia, alcohol misuse and athletics. In February 2011, Crouch was elected to the 1922 Committee executive.

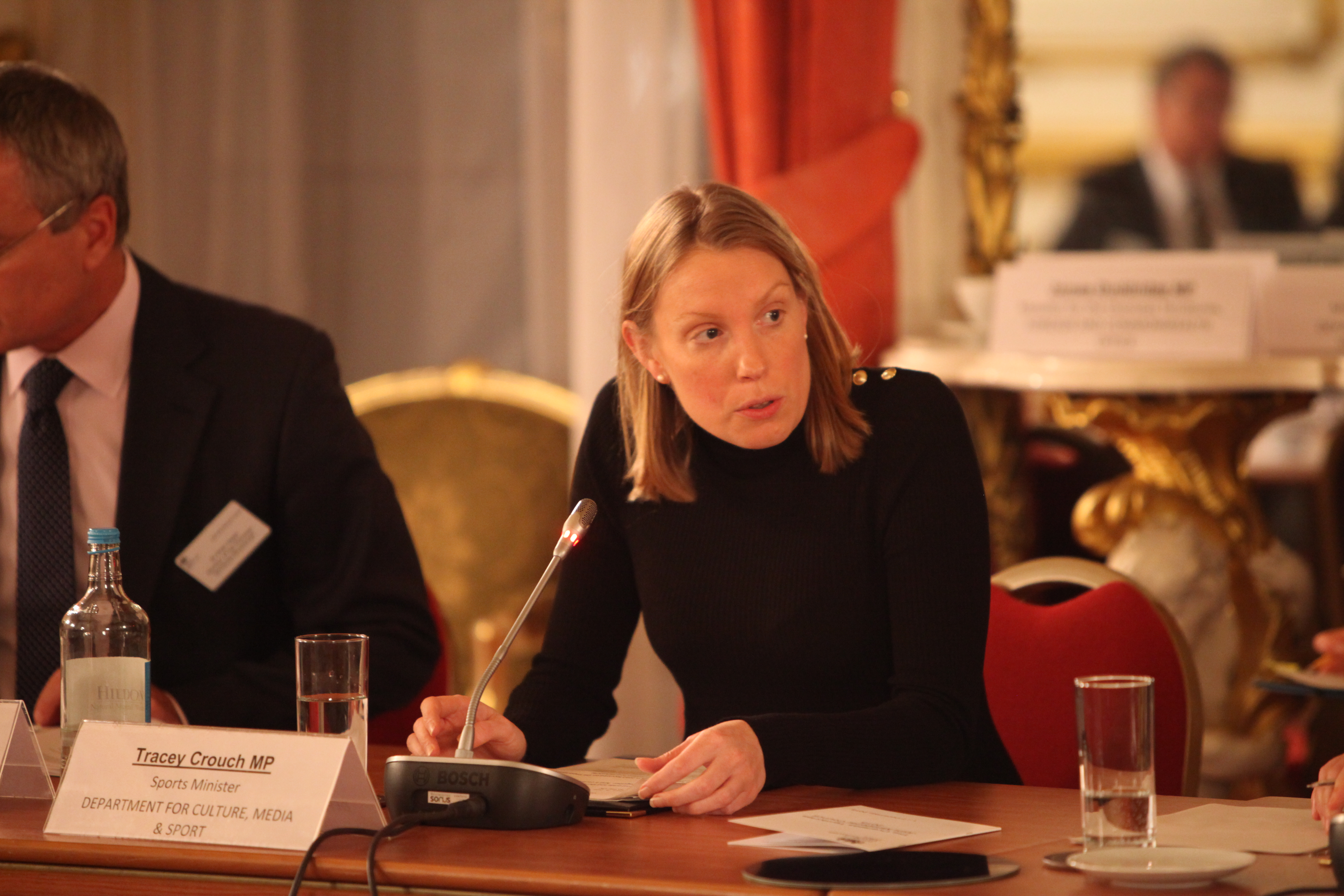
Crouch speaks at the Overseas Territories Joint Ministerial Council meeting in London on 1 December 2015

Crouch voted against the badger cull, speaking during the debates on the subject in October 2012 and June 2013. She congratulated other Conservative MPs for voting against or abstaining on the vote, describing the cull as "barbaric and indiscriminate". She has also rebelled against the government in voting against press regulation and in support of mesothelioma victims.

In 2014, Crouch described herself as a "compassionate, One-Nation Conservative".

At the 2015 general election, Crouch was re-elected as MP for Chatham and Aylesford with an increased vote share of 50.2% and an increased majority of 11,455.

She is an opponent of fox hunting, and is among those Conservative MPs who oppose relaxation of the Hunting Act 2004.

Ahead of the 2016 referendum on the UK's continued membership of the European Union, Crouch stated that she had yet to decide. Subsequently, she chose to keep the way she had voted private "to avoid conflict in her Kent constituency".

At the snap 2017 general election, Crouch was again re-elected, with an increased vote share of 57% and a decreased majority of 10,458.

As Minister for Civil Society, which was added to her existing ministerial brief in June 2017, she was, in January 2018, appointed to lead a government-wide group with responsibility for policies connected to loneliness.

Crouch resigned as a minister in November 2018 over the delay in the reduction of the maximum stake for fixed odds betting terminals from £100 to £2. She, among others, had called for the new legislation to come into force in April 2019, with Crouch resigning when it was announced that the legislation would be delayed until October 2019. However, following parliamentary pressure, the Government announced that the measure would come into effect on 1 April 2019 after all.

Crouch initially backed Matt Hancock during the 2019 Conservative leadership election, but subsequently gave her support to Boris Johnson upon Hancock's withdrawal. She was offered a job in Johnson's cabinet, which she turned down due to family commitments.

At the 2019 general election, Crouch was again re-elected, with an increased vote share of 66.6% and an increased majority of 18,540.

In December 2019, Crouch proposed the loyal address to the Queen's Speech.

In April 2021, Crouch was appointed to chair a review of English football following the controversy over the proposed European Super League.

On 14 December 2021, Crouch broke the party whip to vote against elements of the government's 'Plan B' COVID-19 restrictions, including the introduction of vaccine passports and mandatory COVID-19 vaccination for NHS staff. However, she voted in favour of the expansion of rules requiring mandatory face coverings in public places.

Crouch was appointed Commander of the Order of the British Empire (CBE) in the 2022 Birthday Honours for parliamentary and public service. She was promoted to Dame Commander of the same Order (DBE) in the 2024 Special Honours, again for parliamentary and public service.

In February 2024, Crouch announced that she would not seek re-election as an MP at the 2024 general election for "entirely personal and positive" reasons.

== Personal life ==
Crouch is a qualified FA football coach and manages a youth girls' football team. She is a keen Tottenham Hotspur fan.

Crouch had always wanted to be sports minister, but had a miscarriage during the 2015 general election campaign, leaving her initially uncertain as to whether to take up David Cameron's offer of the post. She gave birth to her first child in February 2016 with her partner Steve Ladner, and became the first Conservative minister ever to take maternity leave.

On 24 June 2020, it was announced that Crouch had been diagnosed with breast cancer but that her cancer was caught early and she had begun treatment. In February 2021, Crouch announced that she had completed her treatment.

On 14 February 2023, Crouch married her partner Steve Ladner at The Castle, Westenhanger, near Hythe.

Parliament of the United Kingdom
Preceded by Jonathan Shaw	Member of Parliament for Chatham and Aylesford; 2010–2024	Succeeded by Tris Osborne
