= Fixed odds betting terminal =

Electronic slot machine

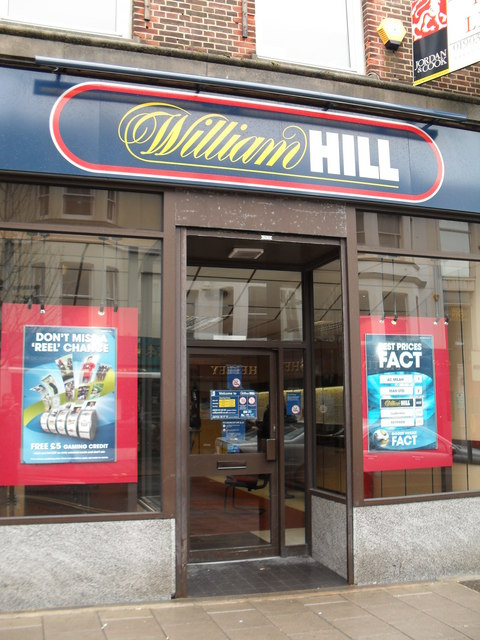
Poster (on left) advertising fixed-odds betting terminals at a William Hill shop in Worthing

A fixed odds betting terminal (FOBT, sometimes pronounced "fob-tee") is a type of electronic slot machine normally found in betting shops in the United Kingdom and introduced in 1999. The terminals allow players to bet on the outcome of various games and events which have fixed odds, with the theoretical percentage return to player (RTP) displayed on the machine by law. Like all casino games, the "house" (i.e. the betting shop) has a built-in advantage. Typically, slot machine FOBTs have an RTP of 90% to 94% depending on the chosen stake, and standard roulette FOBTs have a long-term average RTP of 97%.

The most commonly played game is roulette. The minimum amount wagered per spin is £1 and the maximum is £2. The largest single payout cannot exceed £500 and this can limit the wager size; for instance, the original maximum of £100 could not have been bet on a single number on roulette (which pays odds of 35:1) as this would exceed the payout limit. Token coins can be of value as low as five pence in some UK licensed betting offices (LBOs). Other games include bingo, simulated horseracing and greyhound racing, and a range of slot machine games.

In May 2018, the national government agreed with a reform campaign to cut the maximum bet for some games from £100 to £2. The terminals allegedly lead some players into problem gambling. The Department for Digital, Culture, Media and Sport (DCMS) announced the policy change. The change was due to come into effect in October 2018, but the government bowed to pressure, and delayed it, until April 2019.

== Machines ==
FOBTs typically include a touchscreen and a slot for depositing cash. The major hardware manufacturers for the UK market are Scientific Games Corporation and Inspired Gaming.

== Legislation ==
=== United Kingdom ===
Under current UK legislation, these machines are allowed to offer content classed as Category B2, Category B3 as well as Category C content. The main article tabulates the legal maximum stakes and payouts.

Shops are allowed up to four terminals, although this number also includes traditional slot machines. Most shops favour the new FOBTs over the traditional slot machines. The Gambling Commission reports that there were 33,319 FOBTs in Britain's betting offices between October 2011 and September 2012.

FOBTs have been criticised due to the potential for addiction when playing the machines. They have been dubbed the "crack cocaine" of gambling by critics. In response to this criticism, in 2014, bookmakers represented by the Association of British Bookmakers introduced the facility for customers to set time and money limits when using FOBTs. In October 2017, the Department for Digital, Culture, Media and Sport began studying the possibility of reducing the £100 maximum bet limit and a decision was made in May 2018 to limit the maximum bet to £2. This new maximum bet limit came into effect on 1 April 2019. Multiple bookmakers argued that the resultant loss of revenue could force them to downsize their high street operations (with the industry estimating that 2,100 shops could be collectively closed): in July 2019, William Hill announced plans to close 700 shops, primarily citing the new regulation. MP Tracey Crouch countered these arguments, noting that industry statistics showed downward trends in revenue from physical betting shops in favour of online betting, even before the restriction came into effect.

==== Scotland ====
As a result of the 2014 Scottish independence referendum the Smith Commission convened, led by Lord Smith of Kelvin. On 27 November 2014 the Report of the Smith Commission for further devolution of powers to the Scottish Parliament was published. Page 22 under the heading "Betting, Gaming and Lotteries" states "The Scottish Parliament will have the power to prevent the proliferation of Fixed-Odds Betting Terminals". All five main parties (SNP, Greens, Conservative, Labour, Liberal) agreed the terms of the report. Devolution of this power to the Scottish Parliament will be enacted through the UK parliament in due course. Page 11 of the report states: "The UK government has undertaken to produce draft clauses implementing" ... this and ... "will publish these clauses by 25th Jan 2015".

==== Northern Ireland ====
There are over 900 FOBTs in operation in Northern Ireland, but campaign group Fairer Gambling argues that they may not be legal under Northern Irish law, as the Gambling Act 2005 only applies in England, Wales and Scotland. In 2015 the Department for Social Development said that only a judge could rule on their legality.

=== Republic of Ireland ===
A 2008 betting review in the Republic of Ireland ruled that the machines should not be introduced in Irish betting shops but would be allowed in casinos.

== Money laundering ==
It is claimed FOBTs are used for money laundering by paying cash into the terminal, making low-risk bets which involve a small relative loss, and withdrawing most of the proceeds as a voucher which is exchanged for cash at the shop counter. Changes in the UKGC regulators code have sought to eradicate the potential for money laundering.

== See also ==
- Video lottery terminal
