= Public Services (Social Value) Act 2012 =

Public General Act of Parliament of the United Kingdom

- Act of Parliament
- Parliament of the United Kingdom
- Long title: An Act to require public authorities to have regard to economic, social and environmental well-being in connection with public services contracts; and for connected purposes.
- Citation: 2012 c. 3
- Introduced by: Chris White (Commons); Lord Newby (Lords)
- Territorial extent: England and Wales

Dates
- Royal assent: 8 March 2012
- Commencement: 31 January 2013

Status: Current legislation

Text of statute as originally enacted

Text of the Public Services (Social Value) Act 2012 as in force today (including any amendments) within the United Kingdom, from legislation.gov.uk.

The Public Services (Social Value) Act 2012 (c. 3) is an act of the Parliament of the United Kingdom. The act calls for all public sector commissioning to factor in ("have regard to") economic, social and environmental well-being in connection with public services contracts. It requires that all public bodies in England and Wales, including local authorities and NHS organisations, to consider how the services they commission and procure which are expected to cost more than the thresholds provided for in the Public Contracts Regulations might improve the social, economic and environmental well-being of the area. Third Sector organisations such as Social Enterprise UK pushed for the introduction of the legislation. In early drafts the bill had a far greater focus on increasing public spending with social enterprises. The final text of the act is focused on ensuring public spending leverages value in all three recognized domains or pillars of sustainable development, or the triple bottom line.

== Passage ==
The bill's original title was the Public Services (Social Enterprise and Social Value) Bill. It was presented to the House of Commons in 2010 by Chris White MP, the Member of Parliament for Warwick and Leamington as a private members' bill. It received royal assent on 8 March 2012.

== Implementation ==
Lord Young, the Prime Minister's Adviser on Enterprise, conducted a review of the Act, which examined how the Act has been performing in its first 2 years. The report contains a number of case studies, practical guidance on how to apply the Act, and a framework and principles for measurement. A case studies which used social return on investment calculations and one which involved service users in grant award decision-making were quoted and considered "helpful" by the government.

Procurement Policy Note 10/12 providing advice for public sector staff was produced when the Act came into force in January 2013. The note confirms that contracts for goods and works, and contracts below the relevant monetary thresholds in the Public Contracts Regulations, are not covered by the Act. The Policy Note encourages public bodies to consult with supply markets and with voluntary and community organisations when developing specifications and planning bid evaluation.

The Government also conducted a one-year on update on the Act.

Research published by Social Enterprise UK in 2016 divided implementing local authorities into several groups: some had interpreted the legislation as "empowering" and taken its objectives "to heart", some very actively, others more cautiously; a further group had demonstrated compliance with a relevant policy document but had not yet enacted this in practice, and there was another group of local authorities described by Social Enterprise UK as "bystanders" with at that time "no social value policy and no social value activity". Later research by National Voices and Social Enterprise UK also found that only 13% of clinical commissioning groups demonstrate that they are actively committed to pursuing social value in their procurement and commissioning decisions. Only 13% of sustainability and transformation plans mentioned the idea.

== Other social value legislation ==
Along with this act, the Procurement Reform (Scotland) Act 2014 and the Well-being of Future Generations (Wales) Act 2015 are collectively referred to by the UK government as "social value legislation".
