= Chris White (British politician) =

British politician (born 1967)

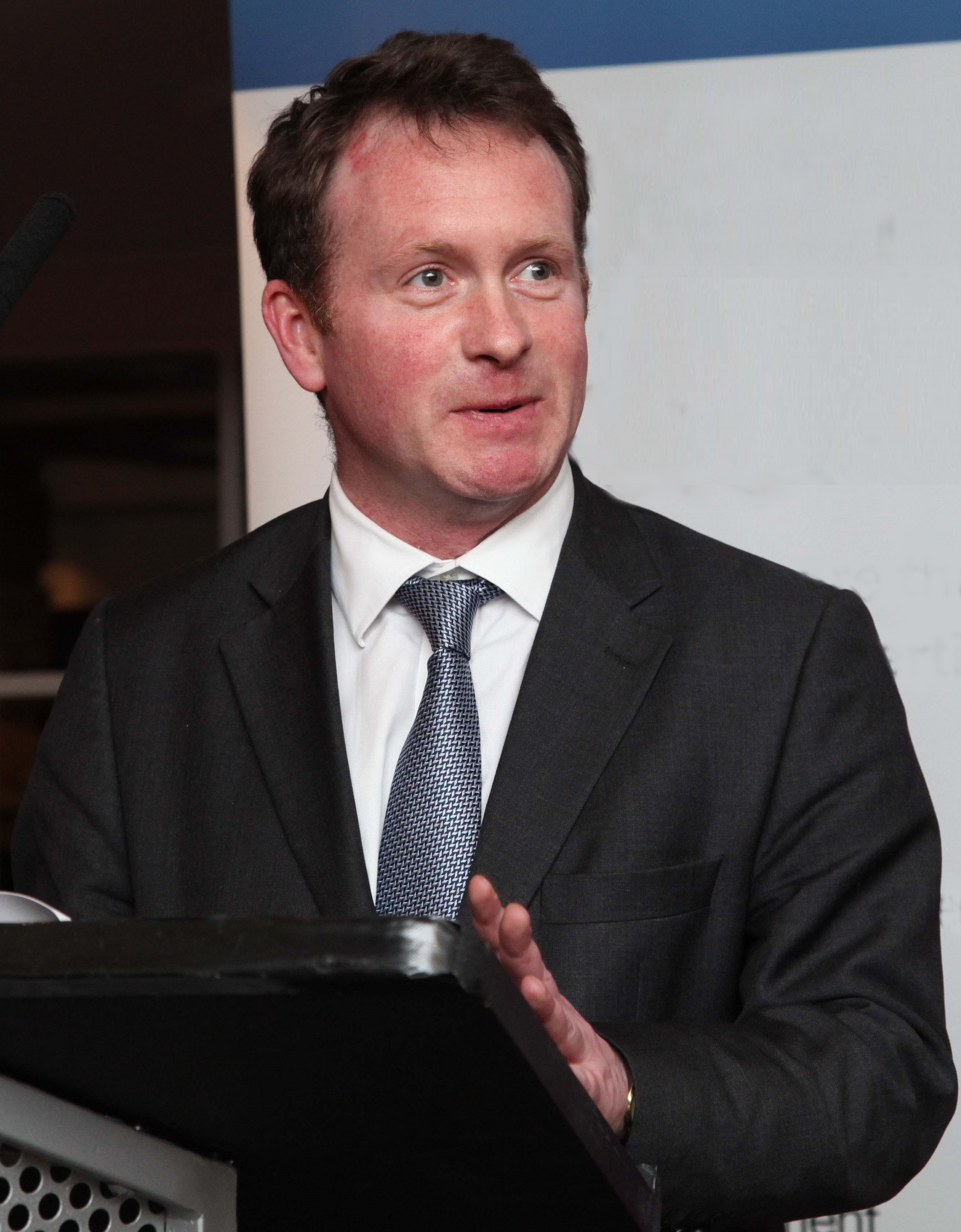
- White in 2012

Member of Parliament for Warwick and Leamington
- In office 6 May 2010 – 3 May 2017
- Preceded by: James Plaskitt
- Succeeded by: Matt Western

Personal details
- Born: 28 April 1967 (age 59)
- Party: Conservative
- Education: University of Manchester; University of Bath
- Website: www.chriswhitemp.com

Christopher Mark Francis White (born 28 April 1967 in Australia) is a British Conservative Party politician and was the Member of Parliament (MP) for Warwick and Leamington from 2010 to 2017. He lost the seat at the 2017 general election. White is currently Director of the Institute for Industrial Strategy at King's College London.

== Education ==
White was educated at the state comprehensive St. Gregory's Catholic School, Tunbridge Wells, followed by the University of Manchester, where he obtained a BEng in Engineering, and an MBA from the University of Bath.

== Career ==
White unsuccessfully contested the Labour stronghold of Birmingham Hall Green at the 2001 general election, then the marginal Warwick and Leamington at the 2005 general election, but was again unsuccessful. In May 2008, he was elected to Warwick District Council. At the 2010 general election, he gained Warwick and Leamington for the Conservatives, receiving 20,876 votes to the incumbent Labour MP James Plaskitt's 17,363 votes, winning by a margin of 3,513 votes. White had a notional swing of 8.8% from Labour to his party (the boundaries had been changed since the previous election). He held the seat in the 2015 general election with an increased vote of 24,249 (47.9%), leading with a majority of 6,606 votes over Labour's Lynnette Kelly.

He is Vice-Chair of cross-party UK think tank Policy Connect and a patron of the Leamington Spa-based peacebuilding charity Cord.

White proposed the Public Services (Social Value) Act 2012 in 2010 as a private member's bill, aiming to ensure that public sector procurement should take into account wider value to the community provided by suppliers. The bill, which purported to help social enterprises win more public services contracts, was supported by the government and became law in 2013 He was subsequently named as a "Social Value Ambassador" by the government, but was dismissed from the role four months later following rebelling on a vote to intervene militarily in Syria.

White was opposed to Brexit prior to the 2016 referendum.

In February 2016 he was elected chair of the Committees on Arms Export Controls.

In the 2017 general election, he lost his seat to the Labour candidate, Matt Western. In May 2018, White was announced as the inaugural Director of the Institute for Industrial Strategy at King's College London.

Parliament of the United Kingdom
Preceded by James Plaskitt	Member of Parliament for Warwick and Leamington; 2010–2017	Succeeded by Matt Western
