= Timeline of events in the 2006 Liberal Democrats leadership election =

This is a timeline listing the events covering the period from Charles Kennedy's initial call for a leadership election with the Liberal Democrats to the conclusion of the 2006 Liberal Democrats leadership election.

== 5 January ==
- The media reported that eleven of the twenty-three members of the Liberal Democrat frontbench team, which operates as a Shadow Cabinet, had signed a letter expressing their lack of confidence in Kennedy's leadership. The Guardian reported that the letter was circulated by Treasury spokesperson and potential leadership challenger Vince Cable, and that Sarah Teather, Andrew George, Sandra Gidley, and Michael Moore were also among the signatories (although The Guardian noted that Menzies Campbell, Simon Hughes and Mark Oaten were understood to have refused to sign the letter). BBC News the next day lists the other signatories as David Laws, Chris Huhne, Ed Davey, Norman Baker, John Thurso and Norman Lamb. In an interview with BBC News 24 Norman Baker confirmed his signature, as did Norman Lamb on the BBC's Newsnight.
- Charles Kennedy made a statement to the media, admitting past problems with alcohol for which he had sought professional help, stating his determination to continue leading the party and calling for party members to have their say over his continued leadership.
- In the immediate aftermath of the statement, several prominent Liberal Democrats rule themselves out of standing for the leadership against Kennedy, including Mark Oaten, Lembit Öpik, and Norman Baker. Öpik gives strong support to Kennedy, but Baker was more guarded about whether there should be a new leader. Menzies Campbell reiterated that he would not stand against Kennedy.

== 6 January ==
- Media speculation continued that many of the party's MPs were trying to persuade Kennedy to resign before the leadership contest. The letter of lost confidence and asking for resignation, drafted by Vincent Cable before Christmas 2005 and signed by eleven frontbenchers, was delivered to Mr. Kennedy. Nick Harvey has said he was prepared to table a motion of no confidence in the leader at the following week's weekly meeting of the parliamentary party. This was to enable those that would not stand against Kennedy to enter the contest, notably Mark Oaten and Menzies Campbell. Opinion amongst journalists seemed split on whether Kennedy would yield to this pressure to resign, stand unopposed or be challenged in the contest. Further public developments and statements by prominent Liberal Democrats made in reference to the question of Kennedy's leadership were:
- The leader of the British Liberal Democrats in the European Parliament, Chris Davies MEP, said Kennedy was a "dead man walking".
- Ex-frontbench MP and then peer Jenny Tonge, speaking on BBC Radio 4's Today Programme, accuses Kennedy of "destroying the party" and said that she was "appalled, saddened, disgusted" by Kennedy's statement that he was an alcoholic. She said his calling of a leadership contest "underhand" by ignoring the calls of many of his MPs to step down and instead appealing directly to the party membership 'grassroots'.
- Nick Harvey MP said Kennedy's position was untenable. He describes Kennedy's standing in the leadership contest as an "absurd charade" comparing the leadership contest to a "Soviet Union-style mock election".
- International Development spokesperson, and former Parliamentary private secretary to Charles Kennedy, Andrew George declared that he would resign from the Liberal Democrat frontbench on Monday 9 January if Kennedy was still leader. Trade spokesperson Norman Lamb, who also previously served as Kennedy's PPS, declared his intention to similarly resign. Both were signatories to the letter expressing no confidence.
- According to the BBC, Phil Willis MP said that MPs were wrong to dismiss the prospect of a leadership vote for all party members, in apparent support for Kennedy continuing to stand.
- BBC News reported that over twenty Liberal Democrat frontbenchers were threatening resignation if Kennedy does not go, and some other MPs were declaring that they would refuse to fill any vacancies created.
- Matthew Taylor, a close friend of Kennedy's who ran his successful leadership campaign in the 1999 leadership election, tells BBC News 24 that he feels it was essential for both Kennedy personally and the party that he step down from the leadership.
- The Liberal Democrat peer and MEP, Baroness Nicholson, also urged Mr Kennedy to resign, saying that he needed to concentrate on his fight against his drink problem.
- Howard Sykes, of the Association of Liberal Democrat Councillors, came out in support of Kennedy saying grassroots activists would back him and that he was surprised that MPs were not prepared to do the same
- At 18:25, Ed Davey and Sarah Teather were at the head of twenty-five Liberal Democrat MPs, including nineteen members of the frontbench, issuing a joint statement declaring that they could no longer support Kennedy's leadership and serve under him. They called on Kennedy to resign over the weekend. They include eight members of the "Shadow Cabinet" and eleven MPs first elected at the 2005 general election.
  - The MPs were Norman Baker, Tom Brake, Alistair Carmichael, Nick Clegg, Ed Davey, Andrew George, Sandra Gidley, Jeremy Browne, Tim Farron, Lynne Featherstone, Julia Goldsworthy, Evan Harris, Nick Harvey, Martin Horwood, Chris Huhne, Norman Lamb, David Laws, John Pugh, Dan Rogerson, Adrian Sanders, Jo Swinson, Matthew Taylor, Sarah Teather, Stephen Williams, Jenny Willott
- The BBC's Newsnight reports that thirty-three MPs, over half the parliamentary party, feel that Kennedy's continued leadership was untenable.

== 7 January ==
- John Hemming, the only Liberal Democrat MP not to sign Kennedy's nomination papers for leader in May 2005, said on his blog that he was considering whether to stand against Kennedy or not, but had not yet made a final decision.
- At 15:00 GMT, Charles Kennedy resigned as leader of the Liberal Democrats. He explained that he had been "inundated" with support from ordinary members of the party, but felt he no longer had sufficient support among MPs. His resignation was with immediate effect, with Deputy Leader Menzies Campbell to act as interim leader.
- Within minutes, Ed Davey and Lembit Öpik declared that they would not be candidates in the election, Davey saying he would support Campbell and Öpik saying he would support Oaten (if Oaten stands). Later that day, Öpik said he supports Oaten's strategy of consulting with the other contenders.
- Simon Hughes said that he would not make any announcement immediately as he has to fulfill his duties as party President first.
- Mark Oaten said he had not yet decided and would reflect on the situation over the weekend. He said he intends to have discussions with Hughes and Campbell as the other "contenders". Immediately after Kennedy's resignation, he indicated he favoured a single, unity candidate and avoiding an election.
- Sir Menzies Campbell, the interim leader, quickly announced his intention to stand in the upcoming contest and received immediate support from Nick Clegg, Malcolm Bruce and Chris Davies. Matthew Taylor had also said to BBC News 24 he would support Campbell if he stands.
- As Chief Executive of the party, Lord Rennard said that he cannot indicate his support for any particular candidate.
- Julia Goldsworthy told BBC News 24 that she supports Campbell for the leadership, but hoped that the election would be contested. Simon Ashley, leader of the Liberal Democrat group on Manchester City Council, declared support for Simon Hughes.
- To BBC News 24, Vince Cable said he would "do a very good job" as leader himself, but that he would "defer to" and support Campbell.
- John Hemming posts again on his blog to call for a contested election and reiterates that he was still contemplating standing following Kennedy's resignation.

== 8 January ==
- Charles Kennedy calls for the election for his successor to be contested so that party members could have "direct input", having been "shut out" from the decision on his fate.
- A BBC Survey indicated that Sir Menzies Campbell already had the backing of at least twenty-three of the sixty-two Liberal Democrat MPs.

== 9 January ==
- Hughes and Oaten widely reported to be considering standing.
- A second YouGov poll of 406 party members put Campbell on 49%, Hughes on 21% and Oaten on 13%.
- In a rare public intervention in Liberal Democrat internal affairs, former Leader Paddy Ashdown endorsed Campbell.
- Sir Menzies Campbell was set to make his first appearance as Acting Leader at 14:30 in the House of Commons.
- Oaten said he was "toying" with the idea of standing and would make an announcement either way on 10 January. He expressed the view that there should be a contest of some kind as party members were feeling "pretty excluded from the process so far". This was a change to his earlier suggestion that it might be better for the party to unite around a single candidate.
- Hughes said he would reveal his intentions within the week.
- Phil Willis said he would stand to challenge Campbell if no other candidates emerged as he felt party members should be involved.
- John Hemming was collecting nominations.
- At the end of the day Oaten dropped strong hints in an on camera interview that he would stand, citing heavy public support received. Newsnight reported that Oaten had stated he had the backing of the seven MPs necessarily to be formally nominated.
- Sir Menzies Campbell was elected chancellor of the University of St Andrews.

== 10 January ==
- Mark Oaten (MP for Winchester) formally declared that his intention to be a candidate.

== 11 January ==
- Chris Huhne is reported to have the support of five of the seven MPs required.
- Menzies Campbell's first performance as interim leader at Prime Minister's Questions receives lacklustre reviews when a question on headteacher vacancies backfires. The betting on him winning eases slightly, but he remains the favourite.
- Simon Hughes also asks a question at PMQs but also backfires, when the Prime Minister accuses him of a U-turn on NHS policy.
- It emerges that John Hemming has commissioned a YouGov opinion poll into his support within the party.
- John Thurso denies that he intends to stand for the leadership, after the emergence of a spoof website.

== 12 January ==
- Mike Hancock states that he has signed "several" nominations.
- John Hemming decides not to stand and instead nominates Mark Oaten in order to help him gain the seven nominations needed.
- Simon Hughes formally launches his campaign.
- Chris Huhne declared his definite intention to stand, announcing that his formal launch would take place the following day.

== 13 January ==
- Chris Huhne (MP for Eastleigh) officially launched his campaign with a speech at the National Liberal Club, backed by nine MPs.
- Mark Oaten launched a campaign webcast at http://www.futurecast.tv/oatencampaign/
- Sky News announced an hour-long televised debate between the current candidates was scheduled for 16 January at 7 p.m..
- Sir Menzies Campbell set out his position on several matters, promising that if he were elected leader the party would be "to the left of Labour", stating "I am a creature of the centre left." He also denied being against his party's opposition to the Iraq War and plotting to depose Kennedy.

== 14 January ==
- A week after Kennedy withdrew from the contest, Simon Hughes is the bookmakers' favourite, narrowly ahead of Menzies Campbell. The outsiders are Chris Huhne ahead of Mark Oaten.

== 15 January ==
- Chris Huhne does not rule out working with a coalition whilst Menzies Campbell set out his plans in an interview with the BBC's Sunday AM programme, in which he does not rule out a return into front-line politics for Charles Kennedy.

== 18 January ==
- The newspaper The Independent published leaked emails which it said shows that Charles Kennedy has been canvassing support for Mark Oaten.
- At Prime Minister's questions, Menzies Campbell asked the Prime Minister why recommendations of the Bichard Inquiry set up after the Soham murders have been delayed (the Prime Minister responded that he did not have the information in his briefing). Campbell's choice of question and performance was generally seen by newspaper sketchwriters as a significant improvement on the previous week.
- A row erupted over the leaked report that Kennedy was backing Oaten with Kennedy's staff saying he merely wanted to support there being a contest.

== 19 January ==
- Mark Oaten withdrew from the leadership race citing minimal support among fellow MPs.
- In the betting markets, Campbell and Hughes remained neck and neck. The odds on Huhne shortened.
- Campbell held a formal launch for his campaign and was later one of the panelists on the BBC's Question Time.

== 21 January ==
- Former candidate Mark Oaten stood down from the front bench of the party over News of the World allegations that he made repeated visits to a male prostitute.

== 23 January ==
- Huhne overtook Hughes in the betting market with Campbell back to favourite.

== 25 January ==
- Nominations closed, with Campbell, Hughes and Huhne the only three candidates successfully nominated.

== 26 January ==
- In the wake of Mark Oaten's revelations and with rumours circulating, Simon Hughes admitted to The Sun newspaper that he had both heterosexual and homosexual relationships previously, but denied that his private life has any bearing on his ability to do his job. Earlier in the campaign, he had denied being gay; he apologises for such misleading statements.
- Hughes was subsequently a panellist on Question Time.

== 2 February ==
- Huhne was the last of the original four contenders to appear as a regular panellist on Question Time.

== 6 February ==
- Ballot papers were sent to the 70,000 Liberal Democrat members as the leadership contest entered its final stages.

== 7 February ==
- There were reports of a leaked, unpublished YouGov poll of party members. This put Campbell on 40%, Huhne on 34% and Hughes on 24%. A YouGov spokesman denies the figures.

== 8 February ==
- A poll for The Times conducted of party members at the Cardiff hustings put Huhne on 30.5%, Campbell on 24.5% and Hughes on 19%, with 26% undecided.

== 9 February ==
- A separate YouGov poll of 401 party members gave Huhne 38%, Campbell 34% and Hughes 27%. After eliminating Hughes, the figures are Huhne 52% to Campbell 48%. The data was collected 7 February-9 February. The poll was commissioned by a Huhne supporter, John Stevens, and the questions differed from the previous YouGov poll.
- Huhne overtook Campbell as the favourite in betting markets.
- The three candidates form the panel of a special edition of Question Time.

== 10 February ==
- Shortly after midnight, the result of the Dunfermline and West Fife by-election, held on 9 February was announced. The Liberal Democrats win with a 16% swing from Labour. The constituency is near to Menzies Campbell's North East Fife.

== 16 February ==
- BBC News 24 chief political correspondent James Landale chairs a live, televised debate with the three candidates answering questions submitted by the public.

== 17 February ==
- The BBC's Newsnight programme alleges that Chris Huhne misused European Parliamentary money in his general election campaign. Huhne denies this.

== 19 February ==
- The Observer newspaper surveys the chairs of Liberal Democrat local parties. Of those who respond, eight indicate support for Simon Hughes, eighteen for Chris Huhne and nineteen for Menzies Campbell.

== 23 February ==
- The candidates attend the final hustings meeting of the campaign in London.

== 25 February ==
- An unweighted poll for The Guardian taken of 422 members attending the London hustings puts Huhne on 36%, Campbell on 29% and Hughes on 21% and suggests that the second preferences of Hughes voters would put Huhne on 53% and Campbell on 47%.
- A poll of 100 members for The Independent at the same event puts Campbell on 51%, Hughes on 31% and Huhne on 18%.
- The Independent shifts its support from Campbell and announces that it is "leaning towards" Huhne.

== 26 February ==
- The Independent on Sunday backs Chris Huhne.

== 28 February ==
- The three candidates are all interviewed on the BBC programme The Daily Politics.

== 1 March ==
- The final votes are received and the ballot closes.

== 2 March ==
- Turnout was 72%. Hughes was eliminated after the first round, with Campbell ahead. After transfers, Campbell won.
- Campbell's victory automatically resulted in the Deputy Leadership becoming vacant. See: 2006 Liberal Democrats deputy leadership election.
