= 2006 Liberal Democrats leadership election =

- 25 January – 2 March 2006
- Turnout: 52,036 (72.2%) ▲10.2%
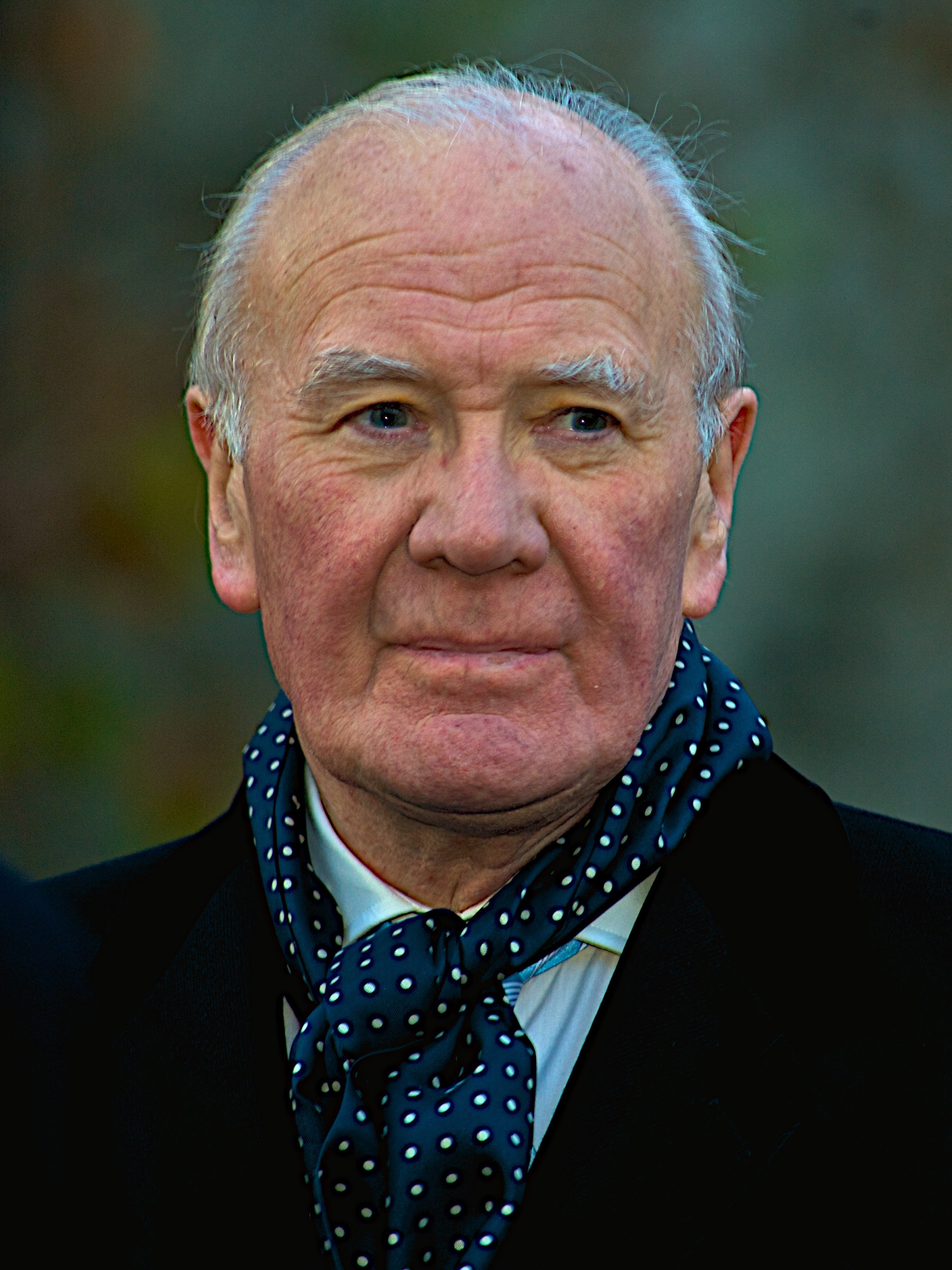

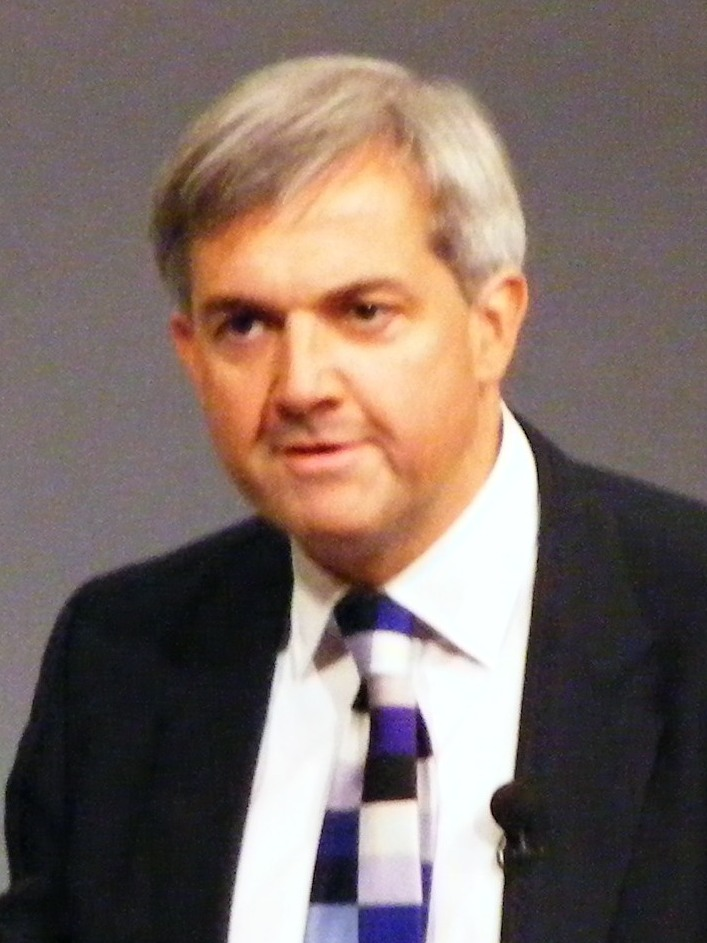

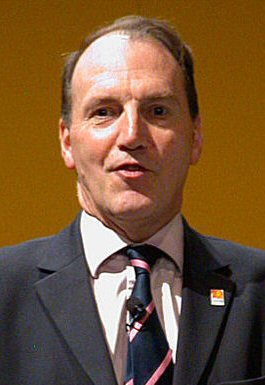
Candidate	Menzies Campbell	Chris Huhne	Simon Hughes
First round	23,264 (44.7%)	16,691 (32.1%)	12,081 (23.2%)
Second round	29,697 (57.1%)	21,628 (41.6%)	Eliminated
Leader before election
Menzies Campbell (interim)
Charles Kennedy
Elected Leader
Menzies Campbell

In the 2006 Liberal Democrats leadership election, Menzies Campbell was elected to succeed Charles Kennedy as Leader of the Liberal Democrats, the third-largest political party in the United Kingdom.

On 5 January 2006, following a period of heavy speculation about both his leadership and his personal life, party leader Charles Kennedy called for a leadership contest to allow party members to decide if his leadership should continue. On 7 January 2006, following public pressure from many prominent Liberal Democrats to stand down, including twenty-five Members of Parliament who publicly announced they would refuse to serve on the party's frontbench if he did not stand aside, Kennedy announced that he would not be standing in the leadership election, resigning as party leader with immediate effect.

Four candidates declared their intention to stand: Campbell, then interim leader; home affairs spokesman Mark Oaten; the party's president, Simon Hughes; and deputy Treasury spokesman Chris Huhne. Oaten garnered little support from colleagues and withdrew from the contest, confessing two days later to a sexual relationship with a male prostitute. Nominations for the leadership closed on 25 January 2006, and Campbell was announced as the winner on 2 March 2006, having won 45 per cent of the first preference votes cast. This rose to 58 per cent when votes cast for third-placed Hughes were excluded and his voters' second preferences were counted.

== Results ==
First round
Candidate	Votes	%
Sir Menzies Campbell	23,264	44.7
Chris Huhne	16,691	32.1
Simon Hughes ✗	12,081	23.2
Turnout	52,036	72.2

Second round
Candidate	Transfers	Votes	%
Sir Menzies Campbell ✓	+6,433	29,697	57.1
Chris Huhne	+4,937	21,628	41.6
Not transferable	+711	711	1.4

Note: if non-transferable votes are discounted, the percentage of the vote won by Campbell was 57.9% and that won by Huhne was 42.1%. Simon Hughes's second preferences split as follows: Campbell 53.2%, Huhne 40.9%, non-transferable (i.e., no second preference given) 5.9%.

== The downfall of Charles Kennedy ==
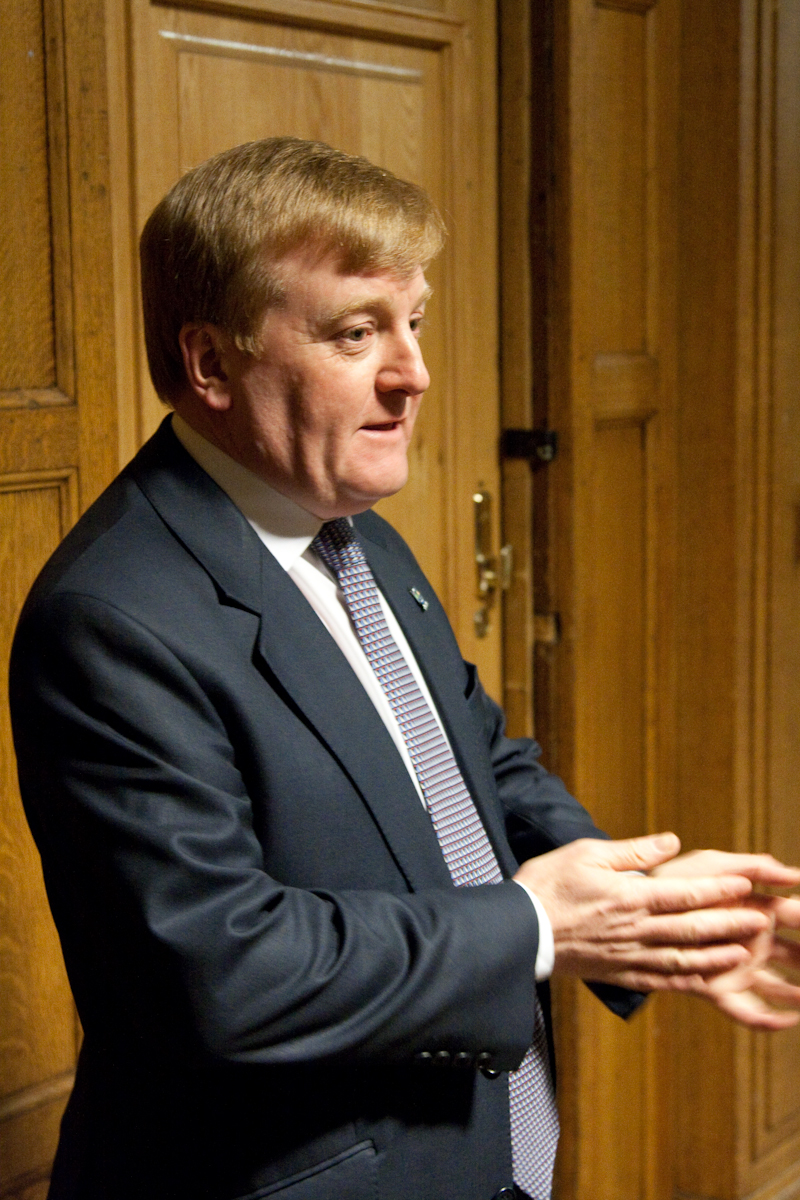
Charles Kennedy's leadership was heavily criticised following the 2005 general election.

In the wake of the 2005 general election, Kennedy's leadership came under increased criticism from those who felt that the Liberal Democrats could have done even better at a time when, arguably, the Official Opposition, the Conservative Party, were in a relatively weak position and the Labour Government remained unpopular in the aftermath of the invasion of Iraq in 2003. Leadership speculation was renewed in later 2005. Following the election of David Cameron as Leader of the Conservative Party in December 2005, it was widely reported that senior members of the Liberal Democrats had told Kennedy that he must either "raise his game" or resign.

A number of issues led to the pressure on Kennedy. There was concern behind the scenes about his problems with alcohol, how he was addressing them and their effects on his performance. Kennedy's leadership style – more a chairman than a leader – was criticised. Many in the party felt Kennedy had failed to resolve debates within the party about future direction (particularly in the wake of Cameron bringing the Conservatives closer to the centre ground). Many of his critics came from the right wing of the party, who wished the Liberal Democrats to, as they saw it, modernise.

=== The final few weeks ===
On 13 December 2005, the BBC's Political Editor, Nick Robinson, claimed that there were briefings against the leader, with members of his party unhappy at what they saw as "lack of leadership" from Kennedy. A "Kennedy Must Go" petition was started by The Liberal magazine, a publication which is not formally affiliated with the Liberal Democrats, but which espouses liberal ideas, has an editor who is a Liberal Democrat activist, and which prints articles by many leading Liberal Democrat MPs. This petition was allegedly signed by over 3,300 party members, including 386 local councillors and two MPs by the end of 2005, although these figures were not independently verified. A round robin letter signed by Liberal Democrat MPs rejecting Kennedy's leadership received 23 signatures. In retrospect, much of the expressed unhappiness at Kennedy's performance as leader concerned his problems with alcohol.

On 5 January 2006, Kennedy was informed that ITN would be reporting that he had received treatment for alcoholism, and called a sudden news conference to make a personal statement confirming the story. He stated clearly that over the past eighteen months he had been coming to terms with a drink problem, but has sought ongoing professional help. He told reporters that recent questions among his colleagues about his suitability as leader were partly as a result of the drink problem, but stated that he had been dry for the past two months and would be calling a leadership contest to resolve the issues surrounding his authority once and for all. It was later claimed that the source for ITN's story was his former press secretary turned ITV News correspondent, Daisy McAndrew.

Responses to Kennedy's statement focused on his previous denials of any problems with alcohol. As recently as 18 December 2005, on ITV1's Jonathan Dimbleby programme, when asked, "Has it been a battle to stay off the booze, have you had to have medical support in any way at all?" Kennedy had replied, "No, no, no, that is not the case, it is a matter on all fronts – if there's something my doctor really wants me to do over this holiday period as a matter of fact, is give up smoking and I think he's right."

== Resignation ==
Following Kennedy's admission, a letter from twenty-five Liberal Democrat MPs was delivered to him on 6 January. It stated that the signatories would not serve as frontbench speakers under his leadership, and gave a deadline of Monday 9 January for him to make a decision before those on the front bench resigned. Despite a combative interview in The Independent in which Kennedy described a decision to resign as a "dereliction of duty", a large number of senior Liberal Democrats stated on 6 January that his position was untenable. Chris Davies, then leader of Liberal Democrat Members of the European Parliament, described him as "a dead man walking". A survey for the BBC's Newsnight programme found that more than half of Liberal Democrat MPs thought he should resign or that his position was untenable, and only seventeen out of sixty-two MPs positively wanted him to stay, while eleven spokespersons from his twenty-three-strong frontbench wanted him to leave. Among those who thought he should go were Norman Lamb and Andrew George, who had both served as his parliamentary private secretary, and Matthew Taylor, the chairman of his 1999 leadership campaign.

On 7 January Kennedy called a press conference for 15:00 GMT at which he announced that he was buoyed by the supportive messages he had received from grassroots members, but felt that he could not continue because of the lack of confidence of his MPs. He said he would not be a candidate in the leadership election, and that he would stand down as leader "with immediate effect", with Deputy Leader Menzies Campbell acting as interim leader until a successor had been elected. Kennedy's leadership had lasted six years. He also confirmed in his resignation speech that he did not have any expectations to remain on the frontbench, pledging his loyalty to a new leader "as a backbench" MP, but saying that he wished to remain active in the party and in politics.

== The rules of the contest ==
A postal ballot was held of all members of the Liberal Democrats. Voting was limited to those who were current members of the party on 25 January or whose membership subscriptions were due within three months of that date. Voting was conducted under the Alternative Vote system, the single-winner version of the Single transferable vote. MPs wishing to stand required the support of 10% of the Parliamentary Party, i.e. seven MPs in the then House of Commons, plus 200 party members drawn from at least 20 constituency parties. However, MPs could nominate more than one candidate.

Simon Hughes, in his role as party President, said on Channel 4 News shortly after Kennedy's statement that he would, with the Federal Executive, see whether it was possible to postpone the leadership campaign until following the local elections in England in May 2006. Following Kennedy's resignation, he continued to moot the possibility of this arrangement. The party's Federal Executive met on the evening of 9 January 2006 to discuss the leadership election and opted for an early vote.

== Opening of the campaign ==
When Kennedy called the election, no one else declared themselves as candidates, with several possible contenders explicitly saying they would not stand against him. However, within an hour of Kennedy's resignation and withdrawal from the contest, Menzies Campbell declared his intention to stand and rapidly garnered support from party heavyweights. Early speculation surrounded the positions of the two other favourites, Simon Hughes and Mark Oaten, both of whom had initially declined to say whether they would enter the contest. Most of the other candidates given serious consideration by the media said they were not standing. John Hemming, the MP for Birmingham Yardley, said he was contemplating standing to prevent a "coronation", but was considered a rank outsider – he later dropped out and backed Campbell.

Following Kennedy's withdrawal, there was also speculation as to whether the Parliamentary party would seek a single candidate to avoid a contest, an option initially mooted by Mark Oaten, or whether a leadership campaign would be a good thing for the party. Campbell was soon seen as the most likely person to be a unity candidate.

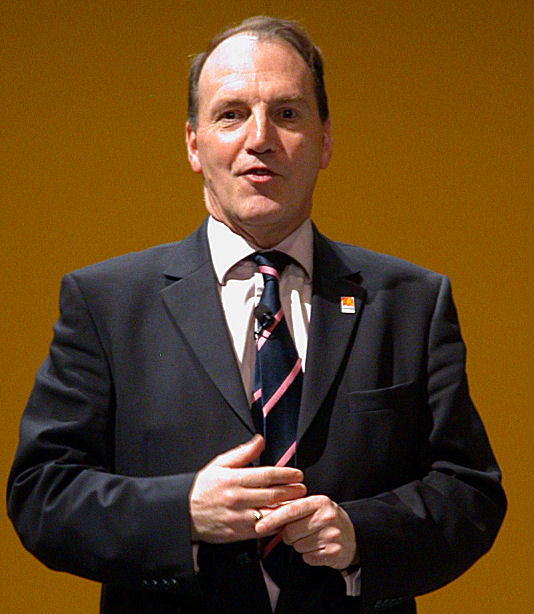
Simon Hughes, the party's president, also stood.

Although Kennedy had decried in his resignation speech the simplification of debates within the party as being solely between left and right, each candidate was seen to draw support from one area of the party. Hughes was identified with the left of the party and was described as being more popular with activists than his fellow MPs. Oaten was seen to be on the right of the party, associated with The Orange Book group. Campbell was seen as more centrist, but identified by those on the right as being sympathetic to them; he was the bookmakers' favourite on the evening of 7 January and remained in pole position for most of the contest. Being older, Campbell was seen as a possible shorter-term leader who would vacate the post following the next general election, which would suit the leadership ambitions of some younger and newer members of the Parliamentary party.

The election of David Cameron as leader of the Conservatives focused questions on Campbell's age: old enough to be Cameron's father, was he too old for modern politics or did his seniority give him an advantage, a welcome contrast to Cameron? Another issue early in the campaign was the extent to which the potential candidates had conspired to bring about Kennedy's downfall.

Campbell's backers stressed his authority, his experience and how respected he was even beyond the party. He was described as a unity candidate who could lead the party out of a troubled period. His detractors pointed out that his experience was largely in foreign policy and described him as an unknown when it came to domestic issues. The implication was that he would lead the party in a more market liberal direction, especially given that his support included prominent figures on the right of the party like David Laws and Nick Clegg. His detractors also questioned whether he was sufficiently supportive of Kennedy prior to the resignation. Hughes's supporters also stressed his Parliamentary experience (he had been an MP longer than Campbell), charisma and his very large majority (over Lembit Öpik) in the poll of party members for the post of President two years previously. In policy terms, Hughes's opposition to any role for the market in health and education was cited. Oaten was also seen to be to the right and talked of modernising the party. He attacked the "nanny state" instincts of the Labour government. However, the bookmakers favoured Campbell and Hughes over him. Oaten subsequently withdrew having gained minimal support amongst MPs. Chris Huhne, an MP since 2005 but a Member of the European Parliament for six years prior to that, entered the contest last, stressing his green policies. He soon gathered support, overtaking Oaten in the betting markets.

Subsequent to his withdrawal from the contest, it was revealed by a newspaper that Oaten had repeatedly visited a male prostitute. Oaten resigned his frontbench position. Hughes was also forced to admit previously having homosexual relations, after his initial denial of the allegations.

== From close of nominations to end of voting ==
Three candidates remained at the close of nominations on 25 January 2006: Campbell, Hughes and Huhne.

At the beginning of the campaign, the expectation had been that the leadership campaign would reflect debates within the party between social liberals (represented by Hughes) and market liberals (represented by Oaten). However, as events unfolded, the campaign became dominated by personal issues. This trend continued when Hughes was pressured into admitting to previously having had homosexual as well as heterosexual relationships, after having previously denied being gay. Hughes also apologised for elements of homophobic campaigning in the 1983 Bermondsey by-election that had brought him into the Commons. Peter Tatchell, who came second in the 1983 election, praised Hughes's apology and recommended that Liberal Democrat party members vote for him. Hughes slipped back in the betting markets.

Shortly after voting papers were posted to party members, a series of polls and quasi-polls suggested that the campaign was now a close race between Campbell and Huhne. With Huhne emerging as a leading candidate after having previously been little-known, media coverage began to focus on him. The final days before the result was announced then saw a surge for Campbell on the betting markets. The result was a decisive win for Campbell.

Campbell's victory resulted in his office of Deputy Leader becoming vacant. He was succeeded by Vincent Cable in the 2006 Liberal Democrats deputy leadership election.

== Candidates ==
=== Standing ===
At the close of nominations on 25 January 2006, the following had been successfully nominated.

==== Sir Menzies "Ming" Campbell ====
Supporters included:

- MPs: Paul Burstow (agent), Danny Alexander, Norman Baker, John Barrett, Tom Brake, Colin Breed, Jeremy Browne, Malcolm Bruce, Vince Cable, Alistair Carmichael, Nick Clegg, Ed Davey, Don Foster, Andrew George, Julia Goldsworthy, Nick Harvey, John Hemming, Paul Keetch, Norman Lamb, David Laws, Michael Moore, John Pugh, Alan Reid, Dan Rogerson, Adrian Sanders, Sir Robert Smith, Jo Swinson, Matthew Taylor, Sarah Teather, John Thurso, Jenny Willott
- Lords: Lord McNally (Liberal Democrat leader in the House of Lords), Baroness Williams of Crosby, Lord Kirkwood of Kirkhope (who is working on Campbell's campaign), former Liberal Democrat leader Lord Ashdown of Norton-sub-Hamdon, former Liberal leader Lord Steel of Aikwood, Lord Addington, Lord Avebury, Baroness Barker, Lord Carlile of Berriew, Lord Chidgey, Lord Dholakia, Lord Dykes, Lord Ezra, Baroness Falkner of Margravine, Lord Fearn, Lord Glasgow, Lord Goodhart, Lord Holme of Cheltenham, Lord Hooson, Lord Jacobs, Lord Jones of Cheltenham, Lord Lester of Herne Hill, Baroness Linklater of Butterstone, Baroness Ludford (also an MEP), Lord Mackie of Benshie, Lord Mar, Baroness Nicholson of Winterbourne (also an MEP), Lord Phillips of Sudbury, Lord Shutt of Greetland, Lord Smith of Clifton, Lord Thomas of Gresford, Baroness Tonge, Lord Tordoff, Lord Tyler, Lord Watson of Richmond.
- MEPs: Chris Davies, Andrew Duff, Fiona Hall, Sajjad Karim, Baroness Ludford (see above), Baroness Nicholson of Winterbourne (see above), Diana Wallis, Graham Watson
- MSPs: Andrew Arbuckle, Tavish Scott, Iain Smith, Jamie Stone
- AMs: Kirsty Williams
- AMs (GLA): Dee Doocey
- Newspapers: The Guardian

==== Simon Hughes ====
Supporters included:

- MPs: Paul Holmes (campaign manager), Annette Brooke, Evan Harris, Mike Hancock, Tim Farron, Mark Hunter, Bob Russell, Paul Rowen, Steve Webb, Phil Willis, Richard Younger-Ross.
- Lords: Lord Garden, Lord Glenconner, Lord Greaves, Lord Roberts
- MSPs: Robert Brown, Mike Pringle, Mike Rumbles
- AMs: Peter Black
- Other notable supporters: Former Liberal MP Sir Cyril Smith, Peter Tatchell (member of the Green Party)

==== Chris Huhne ====
Supporters included:

- MPs: Lynne Featherstone and Sandra Gidley (campaign co-managers), Stephen Williams (agent), Lorely Burt, Martin Horwood, David Howarth, Susan Kramer, John Leech, Greg Mulholland, Mark Williams, Roger Williams.
- Lords: Lord Bradshaw, Lord Clement-Jones, Viscount Falkland, Baroness Hamwee, Baroness Harris of Richmond, former Social Democratic Party leader Lord Maclennan, Baroness Miller of Chilthorne Domer, Baroness Neuberger, Lord Newby, Baroness Northover, Lord Oakeshott, Lord Redesdale, Lord Rodgers, Baroness Scott of Needham Market, Lord Taverne, Baroness Thomas of Walliswood, Lord Tope (also a London AM), Baroness Walmsley
- MEPs: Sharon Bowles, Liz Lynne, Bill Newton Dunn
- MSPs: John Farquhar Munro, Jeremy Purvis, Nora Radcliffe, Euan Robson, Margaret Smith
- AMs: Graham Tope (also a Lord)
- Newspapers: The Independent, The Economist, The Independent on Sunday
- Other notable supporters: Rosie Boycott, former Liberal MP Sir Clement Freud, Claire Rayner, Sandi Toksvig, Polly Toynbee

=== Withdrew from the contest ===
The following Liberal Democrat politicians initially stood but subsequently withdrew from the election:

- Charles Kennedy
  He was subsequently reported as backing Oaten, before Oaten's withdrawal, although Kennedy's office denied this. The support of his close aide Lord Newby for Chris Huhne was interpreted by the press as an indication that Kennedy was backing Huhne.
- Mark Oaten
  Campaign manager: Lembit Öpik. Nominators: Öpik, Mike Hancock, John Hemming, Paul Keetch, John Leech, Paul Rowen and Bob Russell. Various media outlets reported that Oaten had the tacit backing of Charles Kennedy, although this was denied by Kennedy's office. His nominators included several MPs who were prepared to nominate any serious challenger to ensure a wide contest: Mike Hancock (who was supporting Hughes), John Hemming, Paul Keetch (who was supporting Campbell), and Paul Rowen (who was supporting Hughes). Öpik remained the only MP to publicly declare his support, with Baroness Ludford the only peer.

== Opinion polls (leadership candidates) ==
Opinion Polls of Liberal Democrat Members
Candidate	6–8 Jan (with Kennedy)	6–8 Jan (without Kennedy)	10–13 Jan (Campbell v. Hemming)	6 Feb (at Cardiff hustings)	7–9 Feb	23 Feb (at London hustings)	23 Feb (at London hustings)
Sir Menzies Campbell	27%	49%	79%	24.5%	34%	29%	51%
Chris Huhne	not given	not given	not given	30.5%	38%	36%	18%
Simon Hughes	13%	21%	not given	19%	27%	21%	31%
Mark Oaten	7%	13%	not given	not given	not given	not given	not given
Charles Kennedy	27%	not given	not given	not given	not given	not given	not given
John Hemming	not given	not given	7%	not given	not given	not given	not given
Someone Else	18%	not given	not given	not given	not given	not given	not given
Don't Know	8%	16%	13%	26%	16%	14%	0%
Pollster	YouGov	YouGov	YouGov	The Times	YouGov	The Guardian	The Independent
Link							

Opinion Polls of Liberal Democrat Voters
Candidate	6–8 Jan (with Kennedy)	6–8 Jan (without Kennedy)	18–22 Jan	9–10 Feb
Sir Menzies Campbell	14%	26%	18%	21%
Simon Hughes	11%	20%	62%	34%
Chris Huhne	not given	not given	20%	13%
Mark Oaten	3%	8%	not given	not given
Charles Kennedy	31%	not given	not given	not given
Someone Else	8%	not given	not given	not given
Don't Know	33%	47%	not given	33% (approx.)
Pollster	YouGov	YouGov	ICM	YouGov
Link				

Opinion Polls of All Voters
Candidate	18–22 Jan	19–23 Jan	9–10 Feb
Sir Menzies Campbell	29%	19%	18%
Simon Hughes	51%	18%	16%
Chris Huhne	20%	2%	10%
Mark Oaten	not given	3%	not given
Other	not given	13%	not given
Don't Know	not given	46%	56%
Pollster	ICM	MORI	YouGov
Link			
