= Susan Kramer, Baroness Kramer =

British Liberal Democrat politician

The Right Honourable The Baroness Kramer PC
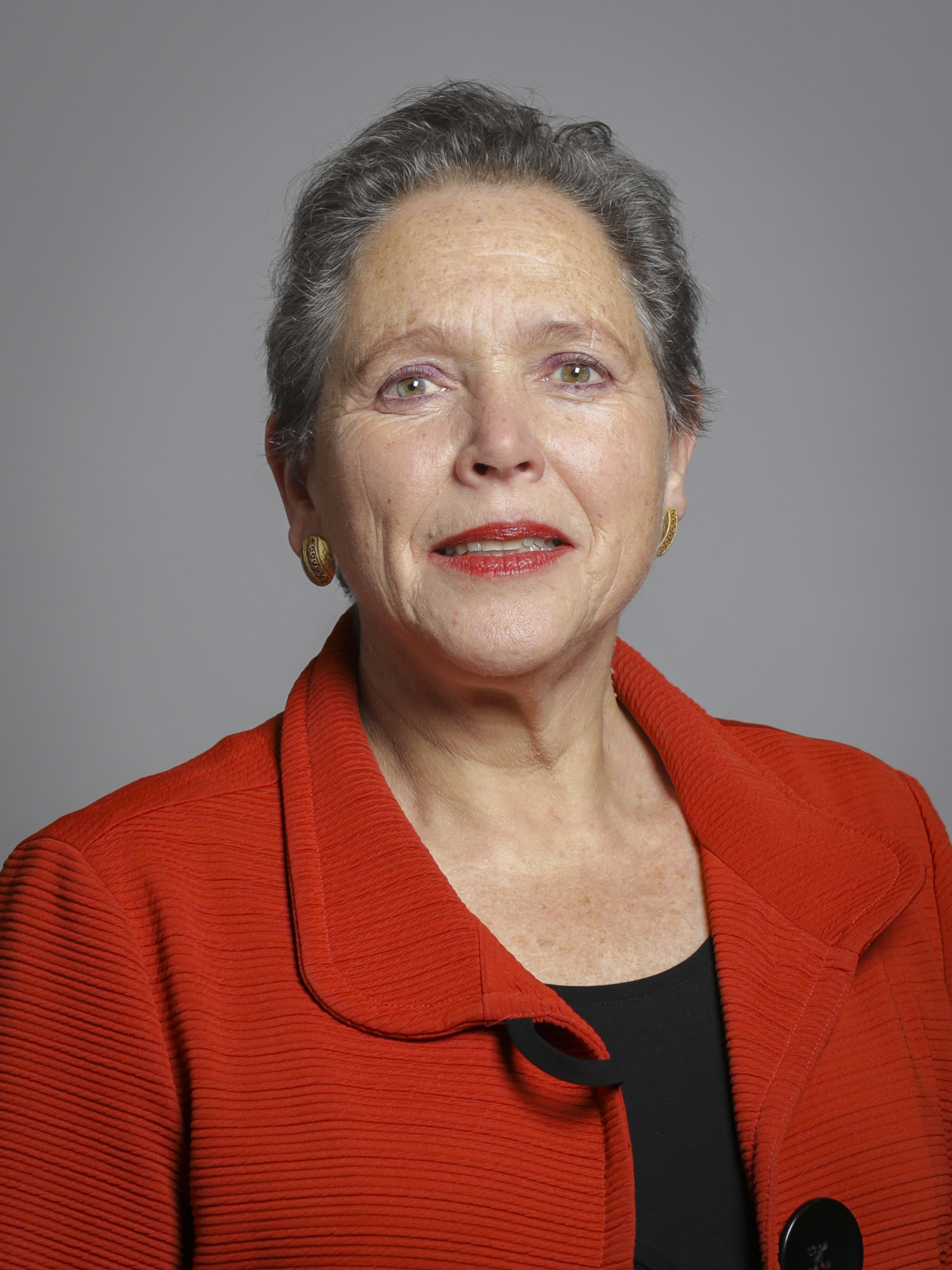
- Official portrait, 2019

Minister of State for Transport
- In office 7 October 2013 – 8 May 2015
- Prime Minister: David Cameron
- Preceded by: Simon Burns
- Succeeded by: Andrew Jones

Member of the House of Lords
- Lord Temporal
- Life peerage 22 December 2010

Member of Parliament for Richmond Park
- In office 5 May 2005 – 12 April 2010
- Preceded by: Jenny Tonge
- Succeeded by: Zac Goldsmith

Liberal Democrat portfolios
- 2007–2009: Cabinet Office
- 2015: Transport
- 2015–2019 (Note: Portfolio briefly covered by Vince Cable from 8 May 2017 to 20 July 2017, continued as Lords spokesperson): Treasury

Personal details
- Born: Susan Veronica Richards; 21 July 1950 (age 76) Holborn, London, England
- Party: Liberal Democrats
- Spouse: John Kramer (m. 1972; died 2006)
- Children: 2
- Education: St Hilda's College, Oxford; University of Illinois, Urbana-Champaign

Susan Veronica Kramer, Baroness Kramer PC (née Richards; born 21 July 1950) is a British politician and life peer who served as Member of Parliament (MP) for Richmond Park from 2005 to 2010. A member of the Liberal Democrats, she was their Treasury Spokesperson from 2015 to 2017 and 2017 to 2019.

Born in Holborn, Kramer was privately educated at St Paul's Girls' School before studying at St Hilda's College, University of Oxford and the University of Illinois. Prior to entering the House of Commons, she pursued a career in infrastructure finance and in 2000 was a candidate in the London mayoral election. She served as Minister of State for Transport in the Cameron–Clegg coalition.

== Early life and career ==
Susan Veronica Richards was born in Holborn, London, on 22 July 1950. She was educated at St Paul's Girls' School, an independent school in London. She then read Philosophy, Politics and Economics at St Hilda's College, University of Oxford. She served as the President of the Oxford Union in 1971, the second woman ever to be elected to the position. She then earned her MBA at the University of Illinois in the United States. She began her career in finance, and rose to become a Vice-President of Citibank in Chicago. She and her husband then set up Infrastructure Capital Partners, a firm which advised on infrastructure projects, primarily in Central and Eastern Europe.

== Political career ==
=== Early candidacies ===
Kramer contested Dulwich and West Norwood in 1997, coming third behind the Labour incumbent Tessa Jowell and the Conservative candidate Roger W. Gough. In 1999, she was on the Liberal Democrat party list for the London constituency at the European Parliament elections, though she was not elected. The following year, she stood as the Liberal Democrat candidate in the election for Mayor of London against Ken Livingstone, and other candidates. She finished fourth with 11.9% of the vote. In March 2003, she again sought the party's nomination for Mayor of London, but was beaten in a three-way race for the candidacy by Simon Hughes.

=== Member of Parliament ===
In September 2003, Kramer was selected as the prospective parliamentary candidate for the constituency of Richmond Park in South West London, following the decision of the sitting Liberal Democrat MP, Jenny Tonge, to stand down at the next election. Kramer was then elected as the MP for the constituency at the May 2005 general election. Kramer was appointed as the Liberal Democrat spokesperson on International Development by the new party leader, Sir Menzies Campbell, in March 2006. She succeeded Ed Davey as Trade & Industry spokesperson nine months later. In 2007 she became the party's Transport spokesperson. When Nick Clegg was appointed as Liberal Democrat Leader, Kramer received a demotion to a spokesperson for the Cabinet Office. She later regained the Transport post in a subsequent reshuffle. In January 2009, she resigned from the party's front bench to defend her seat from a renewed Conservative campaign to regain Richmond. Kramer was one of the contributors to the Orange Book (2004).

Kramer was involved in a breach of electoral rules when her son made four monthly donations of £332 between December 2008 and March 2009 to her campaign while not on the electoral register. A Liberal Democrat spokeswoman said to the press Jonathan Kramer was unaware his name had fallen off the register, and that the money was paid back once the error was pointed out.

==== Voting record and positions ====
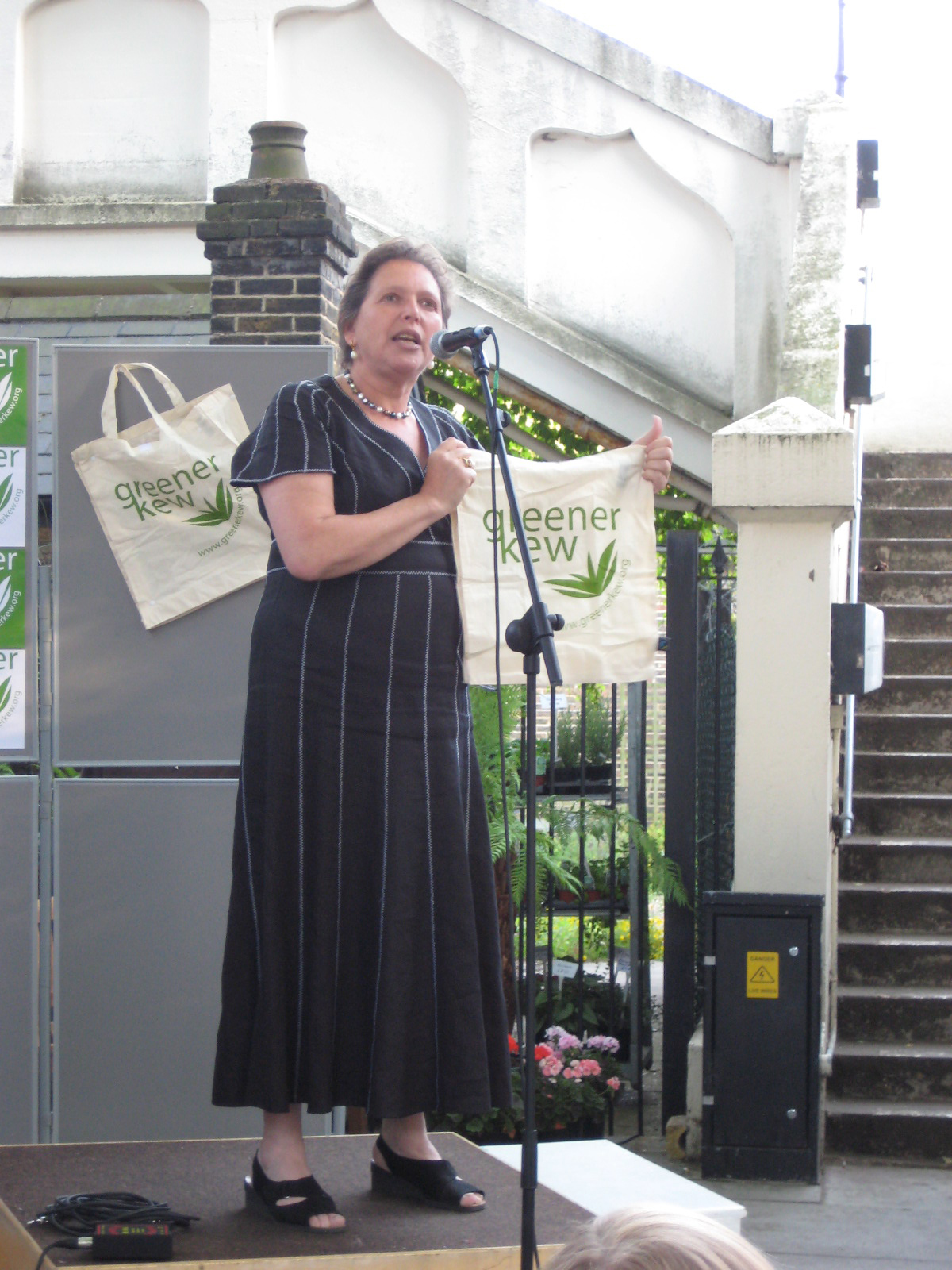
Kramer at a reusable bag launch at Kew Gardens station

Kramer rarely rebelled against Liberal Democrat policy in terms of voting. She has voted against the introduction of national ID cards, against the renewal of the Trident defence system, and for an elected House of Lords.

Kramer took a keen interest in London transport, in particular regarding high-speed rail and the Thameslink Programme. Despite her initial enthusiasm about the opening of High Speed 1, she became more mixed on the issue, citing in 2007 during a debate with a number of Labour MPs that "significant numbers of business customers in south-west London have been happy to make the easy journey by train to Waterloo, but that they simply jump in a cab to go to Gatwick or Heathrow. It is unfortunate, but their passenger business will largely be lost, as the journey to St Pancras will be more than an hour longer than the current journey to Waterloo." Kramer's district of Richmond Park is situated in an area served by South West Trains which provides service into Waterloo station rather than the newly opened St Pancras International station which replaced the former as the London terminus for Eurostar; she later argued for possible use of both stations.

In addition, she echoed her discontent with the management of the Thameslink Programme, originally meant to improve cross-Thames rail travel, claiming it failed to meet set targets and that its cash flow has been poorly managed. She consistently supported Crossrail and was a member of the Crossrail Bill Committee. Kramer voiced her opposition to the expansion of Heathrow Airport and submitted an early day motion that gained support from 54 MPs, 38 from her own party and 16 from the Labour Party. As early as her maiden speech, she opposed the airport's expansion. This opposition was one of her key goals as a Member of Parliament.

On civil rights, Kramer voted for amendments to the Equality Act 2006 that would ban discrimination based on sexual orientation and gender reassignment. Along with all other Liberal Democrat MPs, she voted to allow Gurkhas permanent settlement rights in the United Kingdom, overriding previous legislation which denied such rights.

=== Local issues ===
In early January 2009, Kramer stepped down from the Liberal Democrat Front Bench to focus on local issues impacting her constituency. The principal cause stated was to coordinate opposition to further development of Heathrow Airport, whose incoming aircraft routinely overfly the constituency on their landing approach to the airport.

=== After 2010 ===
In 2010, Kramer faced a challenge from Conservative Zac Goldsmith, defending a notional majority of 3,649 (7.2%). with Goldsmith emerging victorious by 4,091 votes. In November 2010, she lost the election to become President of the Liberal Democrats to Tim Farron by 47% of votes to Farron's 53%.

Later in the month, it was announced that she would be made a life peer, and was created Baroness Kramer, of Richmond Park in the London Borough of Richmond upon Thames on 22 December 2010. On 4 October 2012, she appeared as a panellist on BBC's Question Time. In October 2013, Kramer was appointed Minister of State at the Department for Transport. which she held until the May 2015 General Election.

Following the 2015 election she was appointed as the Liberal Democrat Treasury spokesperson under Tim Farron.

== Personal life ==
She married an American banker, John Davis Kramer, in 1972, while working at Citibank. He died in September 2006. She has 2 children and 3 grandchildren. Kramer is a patron of the Friends of Richmond Park, as well as Home Start, the Suzy Lamplugh Trust, the Three Wings Trust and the Environment Trust.

She lives in Barnes, London.

== Notes ==
Parliament of the United Kingdom
Preceded by Jenny Tonge	Member of Parliament for Richmond Park; 2005–2010	Succeeded by Zac Goldsmith
Orders of precedence in the United Kingdom
Preceded by The Baroness Doocey	Ladies; Baroness Kramer	Followed by The Baroness Wheatcroft
