= Southwark and Bermondsey =

UK Parliament constituency (1983–1997)

- Former borough constituency for the House of Commons
- Boundary of Southwark and Bermondsey in Greater London for the 1983 general election
- County: Greater London
- Major settlements: Bermondsey, Rotherhithe

1983–1997
- Seats: One
- Created from: Bermondsey (vast bulk of); Peckham (small part of)
- Replaced by: North Southwark and Bermondsey

Southwark and Bermondsey was an inner city constituency in London, United Kingdom. Its sole Member of Parliament was Simon Hughes, in the first stage of his career in the house, as a Liberal then Liberal Democrat after the party's founding in 1988. It was replaced with the North Southwark and Bermondsey seat in 1997.

== History ==
The constituency was created for the 1983 general election and abolished for the 1997 general election. As all constituencies since 1950 it was a single-member-representation seat, of the sort envisioned by the Chartists in 1832 and by the legislators mooting the Third Reform Act - The Reform Act 1884 so had a single Member of Parliament throughout its existence, furthermore a plurality of its electorate voted for the same candidate at each election, the Liberal Democrat (previously Liberal) Simon Hughes.

Hughes had already been the MP for the forebear of virtually the whole seat. His February 1983 by-election win was one of the most bitterly contested by-elections in the UK as it involved Bob Mellish, its retired Labour MP of many years service, running a highly personal and homophobic campaign against the Labour candidate, Peter Tatchell against a backdrop of the Labour Party being at an immense low in the polls nationally amid success in the Falklands War and the start of a phase of strong positive economic growth under Margaret Thatcher. The result was the election of Simon Hughes as a Liberal in a post-War Labour stronghold.

Political and social historic background

The area's "middle class, well-to-do" streets were its main thoroughfares, Borough High Street, Blackfriars Road, Old Kent Road, Southwark Park Road, and Southwark Street in Booth's Poverty Map (1898-1899). The survey found no gold-shaded "upper-middle and upper classes, wealthy" streets and far more "mixed, some comfortable, others poor" streets than those intensely poverty-stricken such as tenement yards clumped west of Borough High Street, east of Great Dover Street and clinging close to parts of the eastern riverside. In the far southwest, St Alphege, Southwark (approximately 4% of the area) was approximately half overlain as "Lowest class. Vicious, semi-criminal.".

The area sustained heavy damage in the London Blitz including 1,651 high-explosive bombs across the wider borough, taking decades to rebuild. Relatively poorly paid dock work rapidly evaporated to leave a labour shortage and local work included settings of low-skilled/paid warehouses, railway yards, buses/trams/taxis, civil infrastructure, and many people employed in the lower-paid public service careers, construction etc. within the aftermath of World War II. This was coupled with major social housing projects throughout inner south London in schemes ranging from cheap brutalist steel-and-glass fronted or plain concrete towers to semi-classical or green landscaped part-brick and concrete mid-rise apartment blocks. The forerunner seat of Bermondsey (created 1950) saw low right wing (i.e. Conservative/Unionist/Constitutionalist/Liberal National) support, rising marginally from 15.8% in 1951 to a peak of 24.9% in 1979.

Before 1950, the last non-Labour MP for any of Bermondsey's one-third-predecessor seats was in Southwark North from 1935 to 1939, in the form of Edward Anthony Strauss who moved with part of the Liberal Party to being a 'Liberal National' at that election, who were a more centrist group. The last non-Labour MP for Bermondsey West was a Liberal – Roderick Morris Kedward, winning in 1923 – who polled 52.5% of votes against a Labour opponent and no right-wing/centre-right opponents. The last non-Labour MP for the final one-third forebear Rotherhithe was won in 1931: early Conservative female MP Norah Cecil Runge, who polled 50.3% in 1931 before facing narrow defeat in 1935.

== Boundaries ==
The London Borough of Southwark wards of Abbey, Bricklayers, Browning, Burgess, Cathedral, Chaucer, Dockyard, Riverside, and Rotherhithe.

Southwark and Bermondsey consisted of the northern part of the London Borough of Southwark. In 1997 it was largely replaced by the new North Southwark and Bermondsey constituency, with 290 electors moving to the Lewisham Deptford constituency.

== Members of Parliament ==
Election	Member	Party	Notes
1983	Simon Hughes	Liberal	Member for main predecessor seat (1983)
1988	Simon Hughes	Liberal Democrat	Contested North Southwark and Bermondsey following redistribution
1997	constituency abolished: see North Southwark and Bermondsey		

== Elections ==
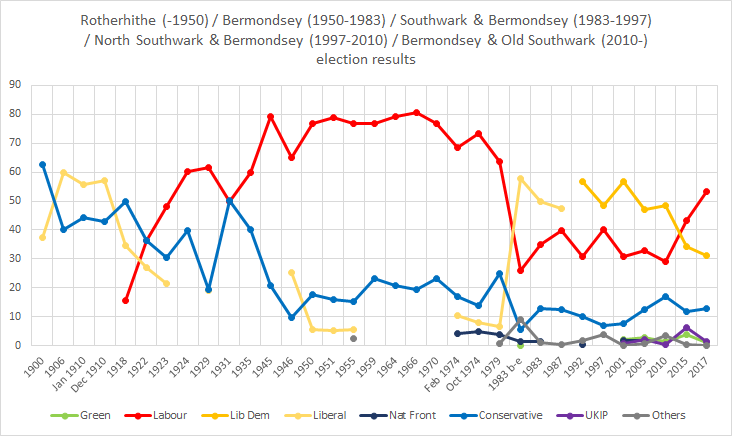
Bermondsey historical election results

1979 notional result
Party	Vote	%
Labour	21,202	63.1
Conservative	8,514	25.3
Liberal	2,316	6.9
Others	1,555	4.6
Turnout	33,587	
Electorate		

General election 1983: Southwark and Bermondsey
Party	Candidate	Votes	%	±%
Liberal	Simon Hughes	17,185	49.9	+43.0
Labour	John Tilley	12,021	34.9	–28.3
Conservative	Robert Hughes	4,481	13.0	–12.3
National Front	James Sneath	474	1.4	–2.1
New Britain	Kevin Mason	154	0.5	New
Revolutionary Communist	Afzal Farehk	54	0.2	New
Independent	Thomas Keen	50	0.2	New
Nationalist Party	Susan McKenzie	50	0.2	New
Majority		5,164	15.0	N/A
Turnout		34,469	61.7	
Registered electors		55,839		
Liberal gain from Labour (Notional.)		Swing	+35.6	

General election 1987: Southwark and Bermondsey
Party	Candidate	Votes	%	±%
Liberal	Simon Hughes	17,072	47.4	–2.4
Labour	John Bryan	14,293	39.7	+4.8
Conservative	Oliver Heald	4,522	12.6	–0.4
Communist	Peter Power	108	0.3	New
Majority		2,779	7.7	–7.3
Turnout		35,995	64.9	+3.2
Registered electors		55,438		
Liberal hold		Swing	–3.6	

General election 1992: Southwark and Bermondsey
Party	Candidate	Votes	%	±%
Liberal Democrats	Simon Hughes	21,459	56.9	+9.4
Labour Co-op	Richard Balfe	11,614	30.8	–8.9
Conservative	Andy Raca	3,794	10.1	–2.5
BNP	Stephen Tyler	530	1.4	New
National Front	Terry Blackham	168	0.4	New
Natural Law	Graham Barnett	113	0.3	New
Communist League	John Grogan	56	0.1	New
Majority		9,845	26.1	+18.4
Turnout		37,734	62.6	–2.3
Registered electors		60,251		
Liberal Democrats hold		Swing	+9.2	

== See also ==
- List of parliamentary constituencies in London
- Southwark local elections
