= North Southwark and Bermondsey =

UK Parliament constituency (1997–2010)

Coordinates: 51.496°N 0.071°W

- Former borough constituency for the House of Commons
- Boundary of North Southwark and Bermondsey in Greater London for the 2005 general election
- County: Greater London

1997–2010
- Seats: One
- Created from: Southwark and Bermondsey
- Replaced by: Bermondsey and Old Southwark

North Southwark and Bermondsey was a parliamentary constituency which returned one Member of Parliament (MP) to the House of Commons of the Parliament of the United Kingdom. The constituency was created for the 1997 general election as part of the 1997 Boundary set for England.

Minor boundary changes occurred for the 2010 general election, resulting in the constituency changed to Bermondsey and Old Southwark.

== Boundaries ==
The London Borough of Southwark currently includes the wards St George, Borough and Bankside, Chaucer, London Bridge and West Bermondsey, Newington, North Walworth, Faraday, Peckham, Rye Lane, Cmberwell Green, St. Giles, Dulwich Village, Dulwich Wood, Goose Green, Champion Hill and Dulwich Hill, Nunhead and Queens Road, Peckham Rye, Old Kent Road, North Bermondsey, South Bermondsey, Surrey Docks and Rotherhithe.

The seat incorporated large parts of the old Metropolitan Borough of Bermondsey and Metropolitan Borough of Southwark, within the modern London Borough of Southwark (which is much larger than historic Southwark).

The seat was created in 1997 and was primarily the successor seat to the old Southwark & Bermondsey constituency which existed from 1983 until 1997. Before that the core of the seat was the Bermondsey constituency in which incarnation a notorious by-election took place in 1983.

For the 2010 general election it was replaced by the Bermondsey and Old Southwark constituency.

== History ==
For the detailed history of the equivalent constituency prior to 1997, see Southwark and Bermondsey.

Southwark North and Bermondsey was unusual for an Inner London constituency in that the area was represented by a Liberal Democrat Member of Parliament (MP) for over twenty-five years. Many commentators felt that this unusual state of affairs was entirely down to the circumstances of the 1983 Bermondsey by-election. Prior to this, the seat had a long history of representation by Labour MPs, but in the early 1980s the local Labour Party was dominated by the far left. The sitting MP Bob Mellish was directly opposed to their approach and accepted an invitation to sit on the board directing the regeneration of London Docklands.

Bermondsey Constituency Labour Party selected its secretary Peter Tatchell. A magazine article he had written about direct action was used by a Social Democrat MP to embarrass Labour Party leader Michael Foot who impetuously denounced Tatchell and stated that he would not be endorsed, but the party was forced to accept him when Mellish resigned from the House of Commons, triggering a by-election widely regarded as one of the dirtiest in history. Tatchell came in for immense local and national vilification and in a shock result the Liberal candidate Simon Hughes established that his party had the best chance of the other candidates, and monopolised the anti-Tatchell vote.

Hughes continued to win the seat, at times being the only Liberal Democrat MP in London. The Labour Party had a strong desire to re-take the seat, which was often predicted to change hands on a uniform swing occurring in elections. However Hughes repeatedly defied the national trend and held the seat. On one memorable occasion, during the results of the 1997 general election he was told on air by Jonathan Dimbleby that Labour had gained the seat, only for the result to re-elect Hughes with a good majority.

In local elections, the London Borough of Southwark was run by the Liberal Democrats until 2010, with Conservative support as the Lib Dems did not have a majority. Labour won majority control of the council in the May 2010 elections. Following Boundary Commission changes to both sides of the Thames, it altered slightly in shape, but changed its name to Bermondsey and Old Southwark. At the 2015 general election, Labour in the person of Neil Coyle finally re-gained the seat in a shock result, bringing Simon Hughes's 32-year parliamentary career to an abrupt end.

== Members of Parliament ==
The seat's only MP was Simon Hughes, who sat for the various Bermondsey seats since a by-election in 1983 until his defeat in 2015, as a Liberal MP until 1988 and as a Liberal Democrat after that.

| Election | Member | Party |
|---|---|---|
| 1997 | Simon Hughes | Liberal Democrats |
| 2010 | Constituency abolished: see Bermondsey and Old Southwark | |

== Elections ==
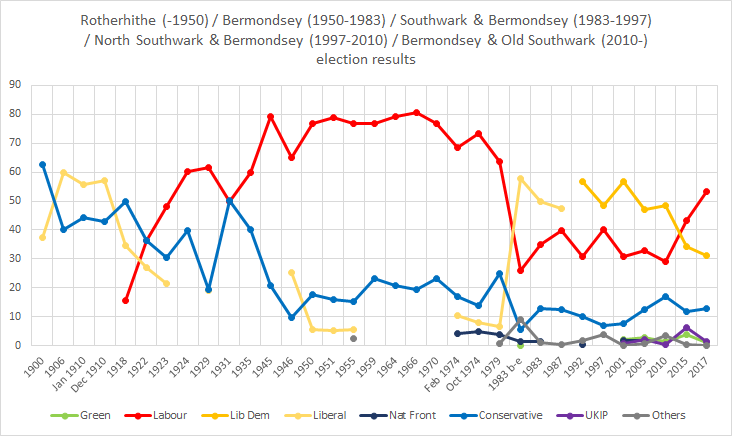
Bermondsey historical election results

=== Elections in the 1990s ===
1992 notional result
| Party | Vote | % |
|---|---|---|
| Liberal Democrats | 22,158 | 51.4 |
| Labour | 14,889 | 34.5 |
| Conservative | 5,170 | 12.0 |
| Others | 909 | 2.1 |
| Turnout | 43,126 | 62.5 |
| Electorate | 69,011 | |

General election 1997: North Southwark and Bermondsey
| Party | Candidate | Votes | % | ±% |
|---|---|---|---|---|
| Liberal Democrats | Simon Hughes | 19,831 | 48.6 | −2.8 |
| Labour | Jeremy Fraser | 16,444 | 40.3 | +5.8 |
| Conservative | Grant Shapps | 2,835 | 6.9 | −5.0 |
| BNP | Michael Davidson | 713 | 1.7 | +0.5 |
| Referendum | Bill Newton | 545 | 1.3 | New |
| Communist League | Ian Grant | 175 | 0.4 | New |
| Liberal | James Munday | 157 | 0.4 | New |
| National Democrats | Ingga Yngvisson | 95 | 0.2 | New |
| Majority | | 3,387 | 8.3 | –8.6 |
| Turnout | | 40,795 | 62.2 | –0.3 |
| Registered electors | | 65,598 | | |
| Liberal Democrats hold | | Swing | –4.3 | |

=== Elections in the 2000s ===
General election 2001: North Southwark and Bermondsey
| Party | Candidate | Votes | % | ±% |
|---|---|---|---|---|
| Liberal Democrats | Simon Hughes | 20,991 | 56.9 | +8.3 |
| Labour | Kingsley Abrams | 11,359 | 30.8 | −9.5 |
| Conservative | Ewan Wallace | 2,800 | 7.6 | +0.6 |
| Green | Ruth Jenkins | 752 | 2.0 | New |
| National Front | Lianne Shore | 612 | 1.7 | New |
| UKIP | Robert McWhirter | 271 | 0.7 | New |
| Communist League | John Davies | 77 | 0.2 | New |
| Majority | | 9,632 | 26.1 | +17.8 |
| Turnout | | 36,862 | 50.1 | –12.1 |
| Registered electors | | 73,527 | | |
| Liberal Democrats hold | | Swing | +8.9 | |

General election 2005: Southwark North & Bermondsey
| Party | Candidate | Votes | % | ±% |
|---|---|---|---|---|
| Liberal Democrats | Simon Hughes | 17,874 | 47.1 | −9.9 |
| Labour | Kirsty McNeill | 12,468 | 32.8 | +2.0 |
| Conservative | David Branch | 4,752 | 12.5 | +4.9 |
| Green | Storm Poorun | 1,137 | 3.0 | +1.0 |
| UKIP | Linda Robson | 791 | 2.1 | +1.3 |
| National Front | Paul Winnett | 704 | 1.9 | +0.2 |
| CPA | Simisola Lawanson | 233 | 0.6 | New |
| Majority | | 5,406 | 14.2 | –11.9 |
| Turnout | | 37,959 | 49.2 | –0.9 |
| Registered electors | | 77,084 | | |
| Liberal Democrats hold | | Swing | −5.9 | |

== See also ==
- Southwark local elections
