= Harrogate and Knaresborough =

UK Parliament constituency (since 1997)

Coordinates: 54.01°N 1.48°W

- Borough constituency for the House of Commons
- Interactive map of boundaries from 2024
- Location within Yorkshire and the Humber
- County: North Yorkshire
- Electorate: 76,777 (December 2019)
- Major settlements: Harrogate and Knaresborough

Current constituency
- Created: 1997
- Member of Parliament: Tom Gordon (Liberal Democrats)
- Seats: One
- Created from: Harrogate constituency

Harrogate and Knaresborough (/ˈhærəɡət ... ˈnɛərzbərə, -ɡeɪt -, -ɡɪt -/) is a parliamentary constituency in North Yorkshire which has been represented in the House of Commons of the UK Parliament since 2024 by Tom Gordon, an MP from the Liberal Democrats. The constituency was formed in the 1997 boundary changes, before which it was named Harrogate.

== Constituency profile ==
The Harrogate and Knaresborough constituency is located in North Yorkshire. It covers the large town of Harrogate, which has a population of around 77,000, the nearby smaller town of Knaresborough and surrounding villages including Killinghall and Pannal. Harrogate and Knaresborough are affluent spa towns with low levels of deprivation. Harrogate is popular with tourists due to its proximity to the Yorkshire Dales National Park and Nidderdale National Landscape, and the town was voted the country's "happiest place to live" by property website Rightmove in 2013, 2014 and 2015. House prices in the constituency are higher than the national average and considerably higher than the rest of Yorkshire.

In general, residents of the constituency are older, well-educated and more religious than the rest of the country. Household income is high and a high proportion of residents work in professional and scientific occupations. White people made up 95% of the population at the 2021 census. At the local council, Harrogate and Knaresborough are mostly represented by Liberal Democrats whilst the surrounding villages elected Conservatives. An estimated 53% of voters in the constituency supported remaining in the European Union in the 2016 referendum, higher than the national figure of 48%.

== History ==
Before 1950 the two eponymous towns had been part of the Ripon constituency. The constituency was created as Harrogate and following boundary changes in 1997 the name was changed to 'Harrogate and Knaresborough'.

The current constituency embraces three former borough constituencies: Aldborough (now a suburb of Boroughbridge civil parish) and Boroughbridge, which were abolished as 'rotten boroughs' by the Reform Act 1832, and Knaresborough, abolished in 1885.

An area with little unemployment, a relatively large retired population and large neighbourhoods of high house prices (Note: In the 2001 census: worklessness was the status of (see Harrogate 009 Middle Layer SOA for access to the whole district): 1.0% of working age people compared to Yorkshire and the Humber: 2.6% England 2.3% However, in the 2001 Census publication "Indices of Deprivation and Classification: Social Grade" 0.27% of the wider District population of 69,614 of working age were Class E: On state benefit, unemployed, lowest grade workers, slightly higher than 0.22% Yorkshire and the Humber average and 0.24% national average) the former Harrogate constituency was a safe Conservative seat. When former Chancellor Norman Lamont stood for the Harrogate and Knaresborough seat in the Labour landslide general election in 1997, Harrogate moved the way of other spa towns in England such as Bath, and more urban and less touristic Cheltenham, by returning a non-Conservative candidate. The Liberal Democrat MP Phil Willis was elected, and served until Andrew Jones regained the seat for his party on Willis's retirement in the 2010 general election with a swing of 9.1% and a margin of 1,039 votes.

Jones retained the seat until the 2024 general election, when Tom Gordon regained it for the Liberal Democrats, on a virtually identical percentage swing to that in 1997.

== Boundaries ==
Map of 2010–2024 boundaries

1997–2010: The Borough of Harrogate wards of Bilton, Duchy, East Central, Granby, Harlow, Knaresborough East, Knaresborough West, New Park, Pannal, Starbeck, Wedderburn, and West Central.

2010–2024: The Borough of Harrogate wards of Bilton, Boroughbridge, Claro, Granby, Harlow Moor, High Harrogate, Hookstone, Killinghall, Knaresborough East, Knaresborough King James, Knaresborough Scriven Park, Low Harrogate, New Park, Pannal, Rossett, Saltergate, Starbeck, Stray, and Woodfield.

=== Current ===
Under the 2023 periodic review of Westminster constituencies, the seat was defined as being composed of the following as they existed on 1 December 2020:

- The Borough of Harrogate wards of: Claro; Harrogate Bilton Grange; Harrogate Bilton Woodfield; Harrogate Central; Harrogate Coppice Valley; Harrogate Duchy; Harrogate Fairfax; Harrogate Harlow; Harrogate High Harrogate; Harrogate Hookstone; Harrogate Kingsley; Harrogate New Park; Harrogate Oatlands; Harrogate Old Bilton; Harrogate Pannal; Harrogate St. Georges; Harrogate Saltergate; Harrogate Starbeck; Harrogate Stray; Harrogate Valley Gardens; Killinghall & Hampsthwaite; Knaresborough Aspin & Calcutt; Knaresborough Castle; Knaresborough Eastfield; Knaresborough Scriven Park.

Minor changes to align with revised ward boundaries.

However, before the new boundaries came into effect, the Borough of Harrogate was abolished and absorbed into the new unitary authority of North Yorkshire with effect from 1 April 2023. Consequently, the constituency now comprises the following from the 2024 general election:

- The District of North Yorkshire electoral districts of: Bilton & Nidd Gorge; Bilton Grange & New Park; Boroughbridge & Claro (majority); Coppice Valley & Duchy; Fairfax & Starbeck; Harlow & St Georges; High Harrogate & Kingsley; Killinghall, Hampsthwaite & Saltergate; Knaresborough East; Knaresborough West; Oatlands & Pannal; Stray, Woodlands & Hookstone; Valley Gardens & Central Harrogate.

As its name suggests, the constituency is centred on the towns of Harrogate and Knaresborough, with no parts more than 10 miles (16 km) away from either.

== Members of Parliament ==
Harrogate prior to 1997

Election	Member	Party
1997	Phil Willis	Liberal Democrats
2010	Andrew Jones	Conservative
2024	Tom Gordon	Liberal Democrats

== Elections ==
=== Elections in the 2020s ===
General election 2024: Harrogate and Knaresborough
Party	Candidate	Votes	%	±%
Liberal Democrats	Tom Gordon	23,976	46.1	+9.9
Conservative	Andrew Jones	15,738	30.2	−21.8
Reform	John Swales	5,679	10.9	N/A
Labour	Conrad Whitcroft	4,153	8.0	−1.6
Green	Shan Oakes	1,762	3.4	N/A
Independent	Paul Haslam	620	1.2	N/A
Independent	Stephen Douglas Metcalfe	136	0.3	N/A
Majority		8,238	15.9	N/A
Turnout		52,064	66.8	−6.5
Registered electors		77,970		
Liberal Democrats gain from Conservative		Swing	+15.9	

=== Elections in the 2010s ===
2019 notional result
Party	Vote	%
Conservative	28,873	52.0
Liberal Democrats	20,086	36.2
Labour	5,349	9.6
Others	1,208	2.2
Green	27	<0.1
Turnout	55,543	73.3
Electorate	75,800	

General election 2019: Harrogate and Knaresborough
Party	Candidate	Votes	%	±%
Conservative	Andrew Jones	29,962	52.6	−2.9
Liberal Democrats	Judith Rogerson	20,287	35.6	+12.1
Labour	Mark Sewards	5,480	9.6	−10.5
Yorkshire	Kieron George	1,208	2.1	N/A
Majority		9,675	17.0	−15.0
Turnout		56,937	73.1	+0.1
Conservative hold		Swing	-7.6	

General election 2017: Harrogate and Knaresborough
Party	Candidate	Votes	%	±%
Conservative	Andrew Jones	31,477	55.5	+2.8
Liberal Democrats	Helen Flynn	13,309	23.5	+1.4
Labour	Mark Sewards	11,395	20.1	+10.0
Independent	Donald Fraser	559	1.0	N/A
Majority		18,168	32.0	+1.4
Turnout		56,907	73.0	+4.0
Conservative hold		Swing	+0.67	

General election 2015: Harrogate and Knaresborough
Party	Candidate	Votes	%	±%
Conservative	Andrew Jones	28,153	52.7	+7.0
Liberal Democrats	Helen Flynn	11,782	22.1	−21.7
UKIP	David Simister	5,681	10.6	+8.6
Labour	Jan Williams	5,409	10.1	+3.7
Green	Shan Oakes	2,351	4.4	N/A
Majority		16,371	30.6	+28.7
Turnout		53,376	69.0	−1.6
Conservative hold		Swing	+14.4	

General election 2010: Harrogate and Knaresborough
Party	Candidate	Votes	%	±%
Conservative	Andrew Jones	24,305	45.7	+9.8
Liberal Democrats	Claire Kelley	23,266	43.8	−8.4
Labour	Kevin McNerney	3,413	6.4	−2.7
BNP	Steve Gill	1,094	2.1	+1.1
UKIP	John Upex	1,056	2.0	+0.3
Majority		1,039	1.9	N/A
Turnout		53,134	70.6	+3.9
Conservative gain from Liberal Democrats		Swing	+9.1	

=== Elections in the 2000s ===
General election 2005: Harrogate and Knaresborough
Party	Candidate	Votes	%	±%
Liberal Democrats	Phil Willis	24,113	56.3	+0.7
Conservative	Maggie Punyer	13,684	31.9	−2.7
Labour	Lorraine Ferris	3,627	8.5	+1.1
UKIP	Chris Royston	845	2.0	+0.2
BNP	Colin Banner	466	1.1	N/A
Alliance For Change	John Allman	123	0.3	N/A
Majority		10,429	24.4	+3.4
Turnout		42,858	65.3	+0.7
Liberal Democrats hold		Swing		

General election 2001: Harrogate and Knaresborough
Party	Candidate	Votes	%	±%
Liberal Democrats	Phil Willis	23,445	55.6	+4.1
Conservative	Andrew Jones	14,600	34.6	−3.9
Labour	Alastair MacDonald	3,101	7.4	−1.3
UKIP	Bill Brown	761	1.8	N/A
ProLife Alliance	John Cornforth	272	0.6	N/A
Majority		8,845	21.0	+8.0
Turnout		42,179	64.6	−8.5
Liberal Democrats hold		Swing		

=== Elections in the 1990s ===
General election 1997: Harrogate and Knaresborough
Party	Candidate	Votes	%	±%
Liberal Democrats	Phil Willis	24,558	51.5	+18.2
Conservative	Norman Lamont	18,322	38.5	−13.3
Labour	Barbara Boyce	4,151	8.7	−4.8
Loyal Conservative	John Blackburn	614	1.3	N/A
Majority		6,236	13.0	N/A
Turnout		47,645	73.1	
Liberal Democrats gain from Conservative		Swing	-15.8	

== See also ==
- List of parliamentary constituencies in North Yorkshire
- List of parliamentary constituencies in the Yorkshire and the Humber (region)
