= The Palestine Telegraph =

Online newspaper

The Palestine Telegraph التلغراف الفلسطيني
- Type: Daily Newspaper
- Format: Online newspaper
- Owner: Sameh Habeeb
- Editor-in-chief: Sameh Habeeb
- Founded: 2009
- Political alignment: Independent
- Language: English
- Headquarters: Gaza Strip, Palestine

The Palestine Telegraph (Arabic: التلغراف الفلسطيني) was the first online newspaper based in the Gaza Strip, Palestine. Its staff is composed of Palestinians and international volunteers, both professional journalists and "citizen journalists who do not take assignments from editors or paychecks from corporate controlled media."

Sameh Habeeb, the founder of the newspaper, was then a Gaza resident and photojournalist. The aim, according to Habeeb, is to disseminate, "the voices of the People of Palestine, the Middle East and other indigenous people around the world."

The newspaper began as a blog operated by 23-year-old Habeeb, which was based in the Gaza Strip throughout the three-week Gaza War in the winter of 2008-2009.

The premier edition of the electronic newspaper format under the name The Palestine Telegraph came out on March 11, 2009. The newspaper is a non-profit venture that relies on donor contributions for its operations. Habeeb sits on the Board of Directors as the Chair and Founder and serves as the Editor-in-chief.

In February 2010, the newspaper generated controversy when it published an article which claimed that an Israel Defense Forces emergency aid hospital in Haiti (after the 2010 Haiti earthquake) was secretly harvesting organs and selling them on the black market. The article, written by American blogger Stephen Lendman, cited a video broadcast on Hezbollah's Al-Manar television, which consisted of a warning from an individual named "T West" who claimed to represent the group AfriSynergy, but cited no evidence. In response, founding chairman Sameh Habeeb stated that Lendman’s article represents "him and his views. Some people believe in this and some don’t".

In the aftermath, Baroness Tonge, at this time a patron of The Palestine Telegraph, had to stand down as health spokesperson in the House of Lords on February 12, 2010. In a follow-up article by The Jerusalem Post on February 14, 2010, which denounced the claim of organ harvesting as false, Baroness Tonge called the claim "a silly allegation".

Baroness Tonge resigned from the Board of Patrons in April 2010, after The Palestine Telegraph posted a video — since removed — from David Duke, former leader of the Ku Klux Klan, who claimed Israel presented a terrorism threat to the United States.
