= Liberal Future =

UK think tank

Liberal Future was a British market liberal think tank dedicated to the pursuit of encouraging new thinking amongst liberals both within and without the Liberal Democrats party. The think tank believed that the Liberal Democrats would benefit from a clear understanding of its liberal heritage and principles so that these may be used as a guiding force in policy development, constructive opposition and ultimately national government.

Liberal Future published a newsletter and arranged events, such as debates, and participated in the Liberal Democrat Conference.

Liberal Future's formation led to some controversy within the Liberal Democrats, and encouraged the development of informal 'social liberal' groups like the Beveridge Group.

The last director of Liberal Future was Andy Mayer, and the chair of the Advisory Board was Chris Fox. The Advisory Board also included one-time leadership hopeful Mark Oaten MP, one of the contributors to the Orange Book.

Liberal Future was wound up in 2005.
