= Tom Gordon (British politician) =

British politician

Tom Gordon MP
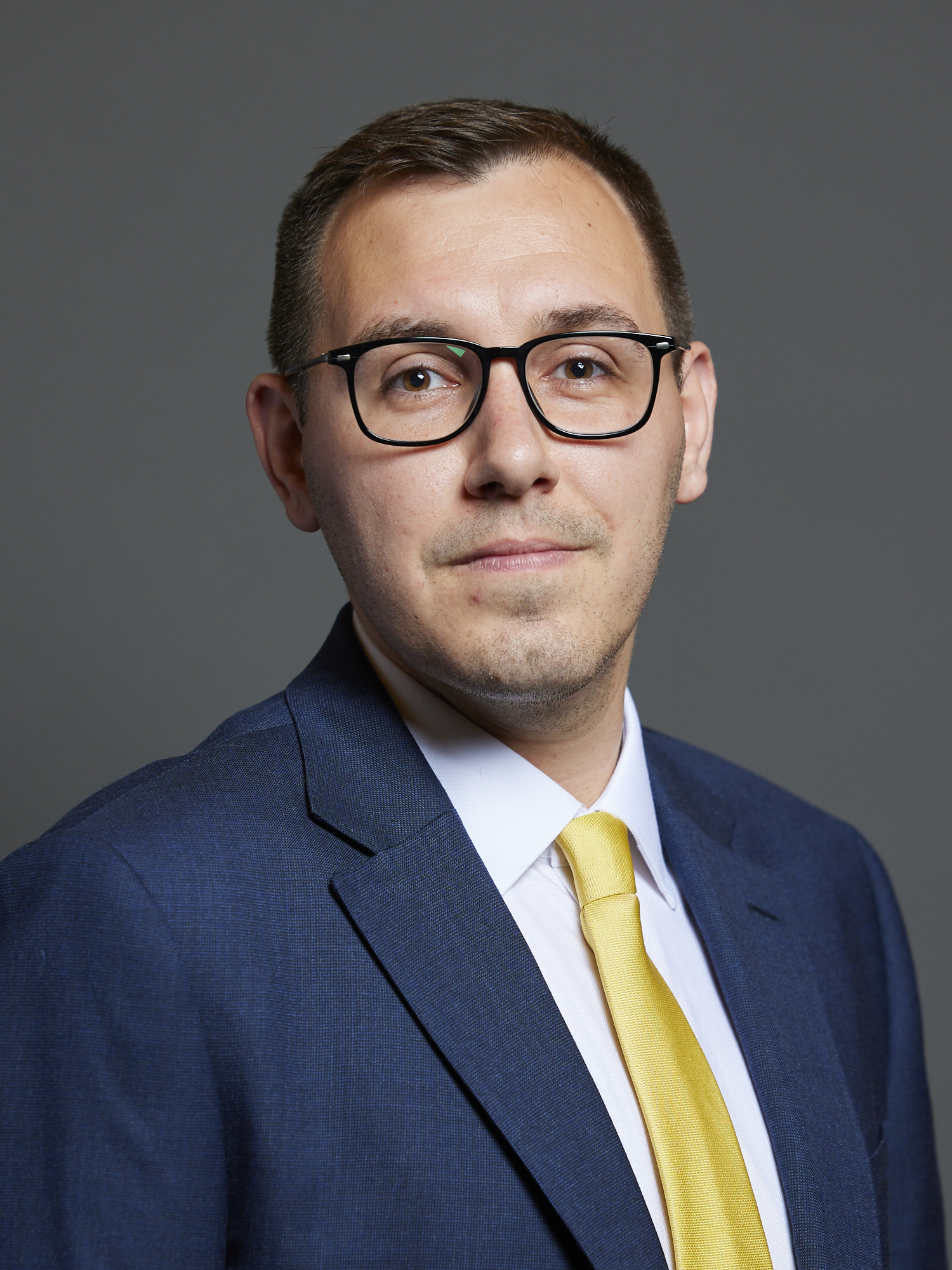
- Official portrait, 2024

Member of Parliament for Harrogate and Knaresborough
- Incumbent
- Assumed office 4 July 2024
- Preceded by: Andrew Jones
- Majority: 8,238 (15.9%)

Personal details
- Born: Thomas Anthony Gordon Knottingley, West Yorkshire, England
- Party: Liberal Democrats
- Relatives: Cllr Adele Hayes (mother)
- Education: Newcastle University
- Website: www.tomgordon.org.uk

Thomas Anthony Gordon is a British Liberal Democrat politician who has served as the Member of Parliament for Harrogate and Knaresborough since 2024.

== Early life and career ==
Thomas Anthony Gordon was born and raised in Knottingley. He received a Bachelor of Science (BSc) degree in biochemistry at Newcastle University. He went on to study for a Master of Public Health (MPH) degree also at Newcastle, which he completed part-time due to his mother's battle with breast cancer, which he says inspired his entry into politics. His mother, Adele Hayes, is a councillor for Knottingley on Wakefield Council.

Before entering Parliament, Gordon worked in the scientific recruitment and health services research sector, as well as policy roles in the charitable sector, including for the Carers Trust, and as a researcher for a member of the European Parliament.

== Political career ==
While at university, he was elected as a councillor for Manor Park on Newcastle City Council in 2018, serving for one year. Afterwards, he returned to Knottingley after taking a job at the University of York and stood for election in Knottingley on Wakefield Council, achieving a 54.2% swing from Labour and becoming the first Liberal Democrat elected to Wakefield Council since 2011.

He was chosen as the Liberal Democrats' candidate for the 2021 Batley and Spen by-election, after the initial candidate Jo Conchie withdrew for health reasons. He had previously stood as the Liberal Democrat candidate for Normanton, Pontefract and Castleford at the 2019 general election. Gordon was chosen as the party's candidate for the constituency of Harrogate and Knaresborough, which he won with 23,976 votes (46.1 per cent) at the 2024 general election.

Following his election he joined the Science, Innovation and Technology Select Committee. Gordon is also a member of the Joint Committee on Human Rights.

Gordon supported Kim Leadbeater's bill introducing assisted dying into law and served on the committee examining the legislation. On 6 February 2025, Gordon proposed an amendment to the bill to increase the franchise for assisted dying such that people with neurological illnesses can request assisted dying services with a 12 month prognosis instead of the 6 month prognosis proposed in the original bill.

== Personal life ==
Gordon is gay. He is also a keen badminton player and runner, regularly participating in Parkrun events, and had completed more than a dozen long distance charity runs as of 2024, including marathons in Paris and Berlin.

Parliament of the United Kingdom
Preceded by Andrew Jones	Member of Parliament for Harrogate and Knaresborough; 2024–present	Incumbent
