= Andrew Jones (British politician) =

British politician (born 1963)

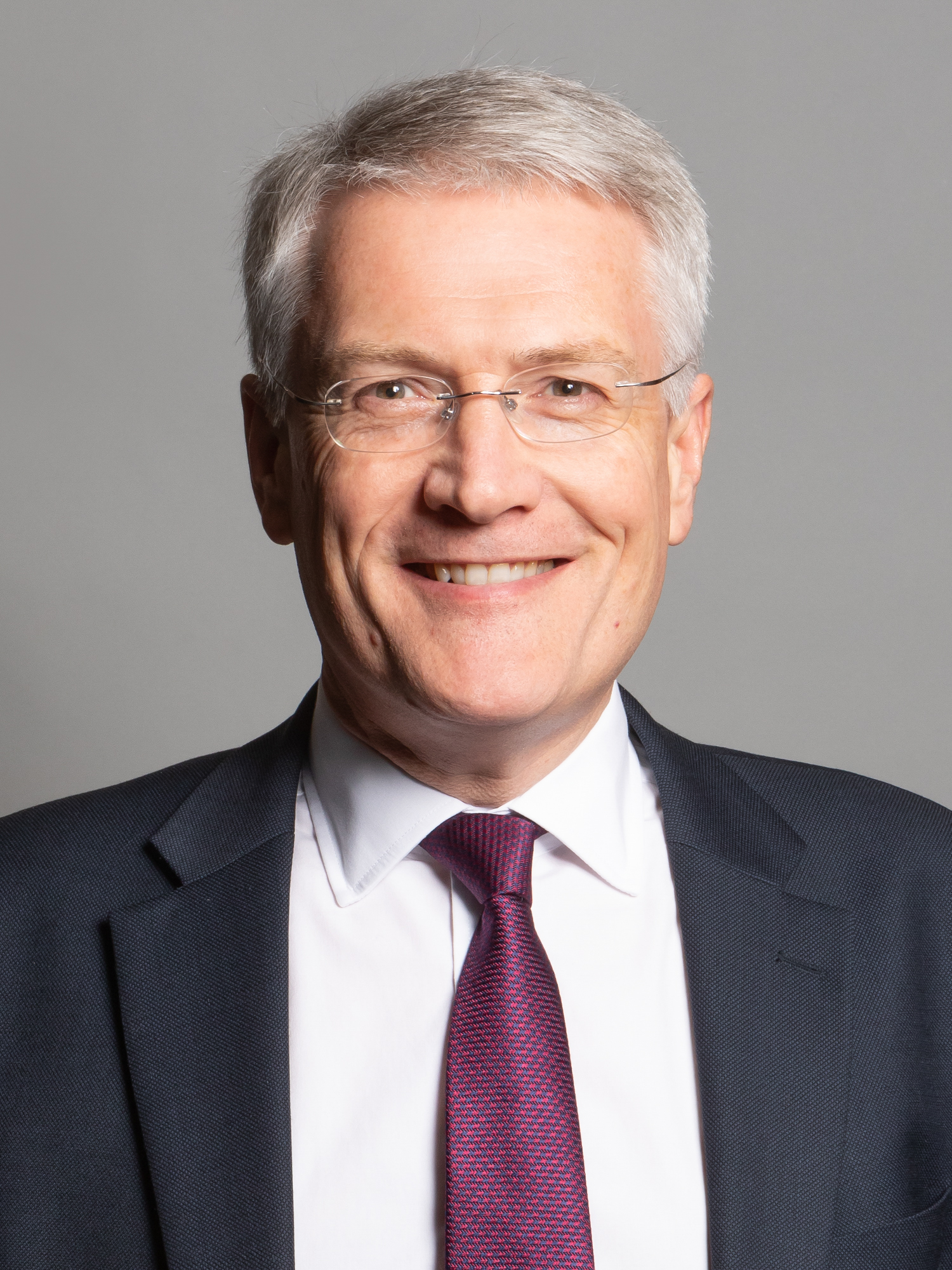
- Official portrait, 2020

Parliamentary Under-Secretary of State for Transport
- In office 12 November 2018 – 26 July 2019
- Prime Minister: Theresa May
- Preceded by: Jesse Norman
- Succeeded by: Paul Maynard
- In office 11 May 2015 – 15 June 2017
- Prime Minister: David Cameron; Theresa May
- Preceded by: The Baroness Kramer
- Succeeded by: Jesse Norman

Vice Chairman of the Conservative Party for Business Engagement
- In office 8 January 2018 – 12 November 2018
- Leader: Theresa May
- Preceded by: Position established
- Succeeded by: James Morris

Exchequer Secretary to the Treasury
- In office 16 June 2017 – 8 January 2018
- Prime Minister: Theresa May
- Preceded by: Damian Hinds (2016)
- Succeeded by: Robert Jenrick

Member of Parliament for Harrogate and Knaresborough
- In office 6 May 2010 – 30 May 2024
- Preceded by: Phil Willis
- Succeeded by: Tom Gordon

Personal details
- Born: 28 November 1963 (age 62) Ilkley, West Riding of Yorkshire, England
- Party: Conservative
- Education: University of Leeds
- Website: website

Andrew Hanson Jones (born 28 November 1963) is a former British Conservative politician who was the Member of Parliament (MP) for Harrogate and Knaresborough from 2010 until 2024. He has twice served as Parliamentary Under-Secretary of State at the Department for Transport and as well as Exchequer Secretary to the Treasury.

== Early life and career ==
Andrew Jones was born in Ilkley on 28 November 1963. He was privately educated at Bradford Grammar School, before studying at the University of Leeds.

Jones worked for 25 years in various sales and marketing roles before becoming an MP. He chaired Conservative think-tank the Bow Group from 1999 to 2000.

Jones is a passionate cricket fan and has been a member of Yorkshire County Cricket Club for over twenty years.

== Political career ==
At the 2001 general election, Jones stood as the Conservative candidate in Harrogate and Knaresborough, coming second with 34.6% of the vote behind the incumbent Liberal Democrat MP Phil Willis.

He became a member of Harrogate Borough Council for the High Harrogate ward in 2003. In 2007, he gained more than half of the votes in his ward.

== Parliamentary career ==
At the 2010 general election, Jones was elected to Parliament as MP for Harrogate and Knaresborough with 45.7% of the vote and a majority of 1,039. He made his maiden speech in the House of Commons on 22 June 2010.

He joined the Regulatory Reform Select Committee in 2010.

Jones was re-elected as MP for Harrogate and Knaresborough at the 2015 general election with an increased vote share of 52.7% and an increased majority of 16,371.

Jones campaigned to remain in the European Union during the 2016 Brexit referendum.

At the snap 2017 general election, Jones was again re-elected with an increased vote share of 55.5% and an increased majority of 18,168.

On 8 January 2018, Prime Minister Theresa May appointed Jones Vice Chair for Business Engagement at Conservative Party HQ, leaving his role as Exchequer Secretary to the Treasury in the process.

On 12 November 2018, Jones was reappointed to the Department for Transport to replace Jo Johnson MP as Parliamentary Under Secretary of State, a position he last held in 2017. He left this role in July 2019 and held no further ministerial responsibilities.

At the 2019 general election, Jones was again re-elected, with a decreased vote share of 52.6% and a decreased majority of 9,675.

Jones ultimately lost his seat at the 2024 general election, losing to the Liberal Democrats by a majority of 8,238 votes.

Parliament of the United Kingdom
Preceded by Phil Willis	Member of Parliament for Harrogate and Knaresborough; 2010–2024	Succeeded by Tom Gordon
