= Phil Willis =

British politician

The Right Honourable The Lord Willis of Knaresborough
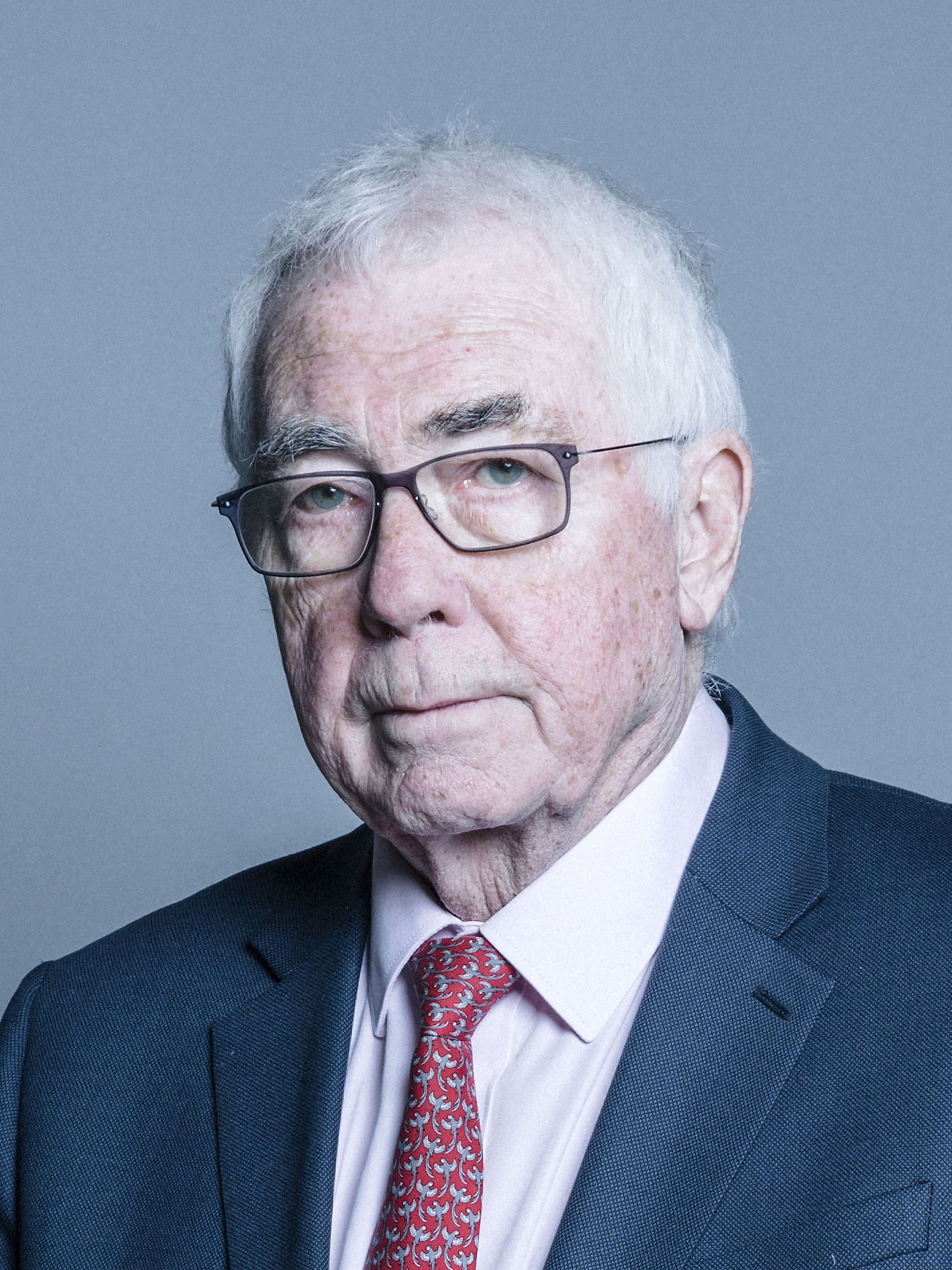

Member of the House of Lords
- Lord Temporal
- Life peerage 18 June 2010

Member of Parliament for Harrogate and Knaresborough
- In office 1 May 1997 – 12 April 2010
- Preceded by: Constituency Created
- Succeeded by: Andrew Jones

Personal details
- Born: 30 November 1941 (age 84) Burnley, Lancashire, England
- Party: Liberal Democrats

George Philip Willis, Baron Willis of Knaresborough (born 30 November 1941, Burnley) is a politician in the United Kingdom. He is a Liberal Democrat member of the House of Lords, and was Member of Parliament (MP) for Harrogate and Knaresborough from 1997 until retiring at the 2010 general election. Up to that date he was the chair of the House of Commons Science and Technology Committee.

== Early life ==
He attended Burnley Grammar School and the City of Leeds and Carnegie College, where he gained a Cert Ed in 1963. From 1963 to 1965 he was a teacher at Middleton County Secondary Boys' School; Head of History at Moor Grange County Secondary Boys' School from 1965 to 1967; Senior Master at Primrose Hill High School, Mabgate, from 1967 to 1974; and Deputy Head at West Leeds Boys' Grammar School from 1974 to 1978. In 1978, he gained a BPhil in Education from the University of Birmingham. Moving from Leeds to Teesside, he was Head Teacher of Ormesby School in Netherfields from 1978 to 1982, then moved back to Leeds to become Head Teacher of John Smeaton Community High School in Pendas Fields from 1983 to 1997.

== Parliamentary career ==
He was first elected in 1997, beating Norman Lamont, the former Chancellor of the Exchequer, and was re-elected with increased majorities in 2001 and 2005. In May 2007 announced his decision to step down as an MP at the next general election, although he said that he would have stood again if the mooted 2007 snap election had been called.

From 1999 to 2005, Willis was the Liberal Democrat Shadow Education and Skills Secretary, having previously served as Higher Education spokesman and acting spokesman on Northern Ireland. Following the 2005 general election, he was appointed chair of the House of Commons Science and Technology Committee, succeeding Labour's Ian Gibson.

In 2006, he stated that he would force an election for the party leadership by standing if there would otherwise be only one candidate. As two further candidates came forward to challenge the eventual winner, Sir Menzies Campbell, Willis did not stand. Campbell's victory left a vacancy for the post of deputy leader. Willis considered running in the deputy leadership election but did not submit a nomination.

At the Liberal Democrat Federal Conference in Spring 2007 (held in his home seat of Harrogate) he proposed a change to official Liberal Democrat policy on the future of Trident in an amendment to commit the party to getting rid of Britain's nuclear deterrent. The amendment was opposed by the party leadership and, in one of the closest votes in recent years at a Federal Conference, the amendment was defeated by 454 votes to 414.

In September 2008, Mr Willis provoked the resignation of Professor Michael Reiss from his position as Director of Education at the Royal Society (on secondment from the Institute of Education). Professor Reiss, in a speech to the British Association for the Advancement of Science, had commented that in his experience as a teacher, children with creationist views were difficult to persuade otherwise, and that merely silencing them didn't cause them to change their minds at all. He suggested an alternative approach: that such pupils should be allowed to express their opinions, not as science, but as 'a world view'. This would provide the opportunity for real discussion and science teaching. Willis demanded action by the Royal Society against Professor Reiss, so stimulating a furore which concluded with Reiss' resignation on 17 September.

== Peerage ==
On 18 June 2010, Willis was created a life peer with the title Baron Willis of Knaresborough, of Harrogate in the County of North Yorkshire and was introduced in the House of Lords on 7 July 2010. Willis was appointed by the Royal College of Nursing to lead the Willis Commission on the future of Nursing Education. The report Quality with Compassion: the future of nursing education was published in 2012.

== Personal life ==
He is a keen supporter of Burnley Football Club. He married Heather Sellars in 1974 in Staincliffe. They have a daughter Rachel (born 1975) and a son (born 1980). His daughter Rachel is a television personality best known for her role of Connie, the so-called "AOL lady" in the AOL adverts, a role which she played from 1998 to 2003. Although from Burnley, he has lived in the Yorkshire area for many years.

Parliament of the United Kingdom
New constituency	Member of Parliament for Harrogate and Knaresborough; 1997–2010	Succeeded by Andrew Jones
Orders of precedence in the United Kingdom
Preceded by The Lord Wolfson of Aspley Guise	Gentlemen; Baron Willis of Knaresborough	Followed by The Lord Liddle
