= Simon Hughes =

Former Deputy Leader of the Liberal Democrats

The Right Honourable Sir Simon Hughes
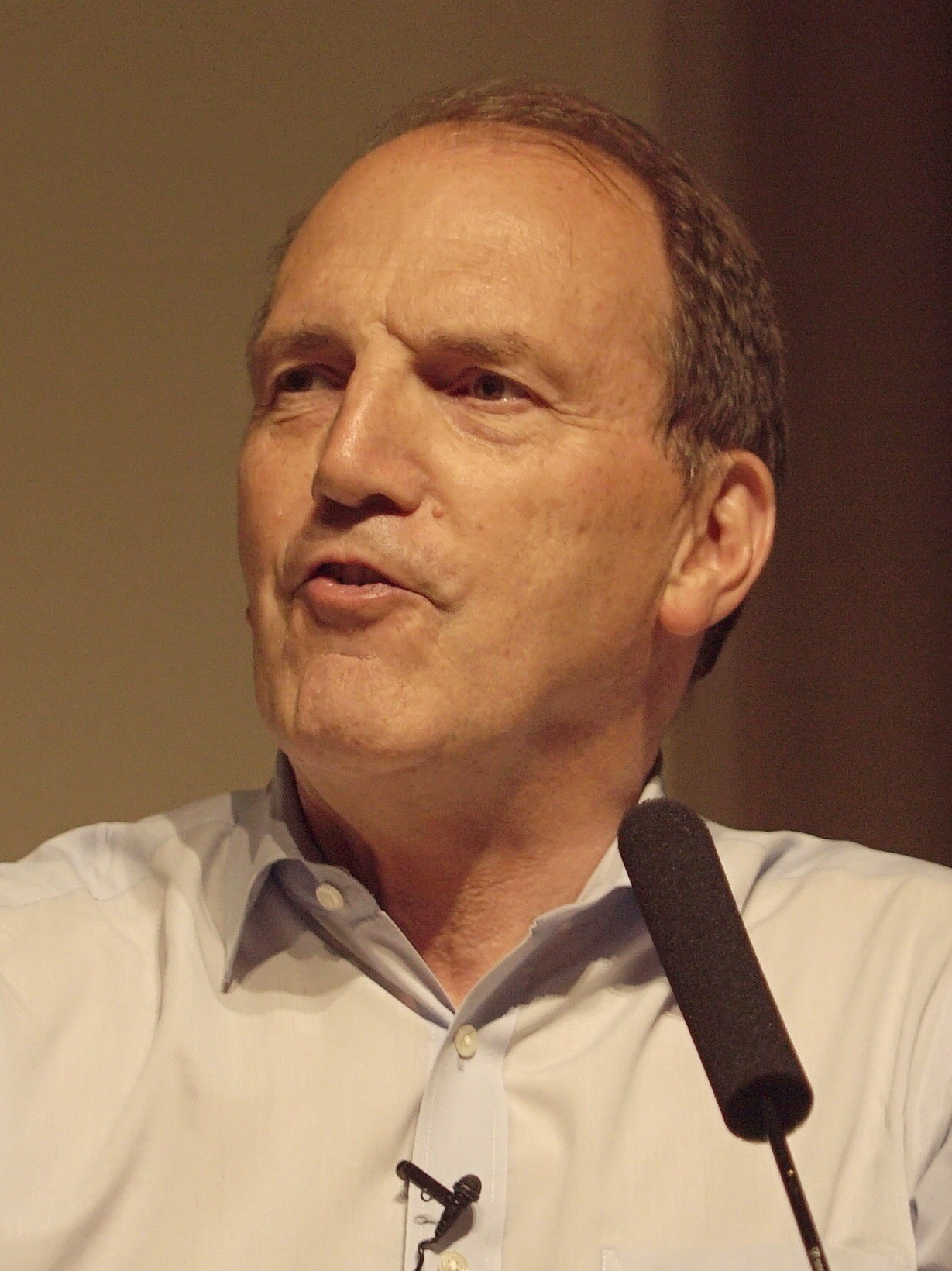
- Hughes in 2016

Minister of State for Justice and Civil Liberties
- In office 18 December 2013 – 8 May 2015
- Prime Minister: David Cameron
- Preceded by: The Lord McNally
- Succeeded by: Dominic Raab

Deputy Leader of the Liberal Democrats
- In office 9 June 2010 – 28 January 2014
- Leader: Nick Clegg
- Preceded by: Vince Cable
- Succeeded by: Malcolm Bruce

President of the Liberal Democrats
- In office 1 January 2005 – 31 December 2008
- Leader: Charles Kennedy; Menzies Campbell; Vince Cable (acting); Nick Clegg
- Preceded by: The Lord Dholakia
- Succeeded by: The Baroness Scott of Needham Market

Member of Parliament for Bermondsey and Old Southwark: North Southwark and Bermondsey (1997–2010); Southwark and Bermondsey (1983–1997); Bermondsey (1983)
- In office 24 February 1983 – 30 March 2015
- Preceded by: Bob Mellish
- Succeeded by: Neil Coyle

Liberal Democrat portfolios
- 1988–1992: Education
- 1988, 1995–1999: Health
- 1992–1994: Environment
- 1999–2003: Home Affairs
- 2005–2007: Attorney General
- 2006–2007, 2015: Justice
- 2007–2009: Leader of the House of Commons
- 2009–2010: Energy and Climate Change

Personal details
- Born: 17 May 1951 (age 75) Cheshire, England
- Party: Liberal (1971–1988); Liberal Democrats (since 1988)
- Education: Selwyn College, Cambridge; College of Europe
- Website: Official website

Sir Simon Henry Ward Hughes (born 17 May 1951) is a British former politician. Until November 2026 for eight years he was the fourth Chancellor of London South Bank University, and a strategic adviser to Talgo, a Spanish manufacturer of trains. Hughes was deputy leader of the Liberal Democrats from 2010 to 2014, and from 2013 until 2015 was Minister of State at the Ministry of Justice. He was the Member of Parliament (MP) for the constituency of Bermondsey and Old Southwark (and its predecessors) from 1983 until 2015. He declined a position in the House of Lords in 2015.

Until 2008, Hughes was president of the Liberal Democrats (the party president chairs the Federal Executive board of the party, is the senior elected party official and also represents the party at official functions). Hughes has twice run unsuccessfully for the leadership of the party and was its unsuccessful candidate for Mayor of London in the 2004 election.

Hughes was appointed as a Privy Councillor on 15 December 2010. In December 2013, he was appointed as a Minister of State for Justice and Civil Liberties, and announced he would stand down as Deputy Leader upon the election of a successor. Hughes is a trustee of the Rose Theatre Trust, and of the Friends of Guy's and St Thomas’ Hospital Trust, and an Honorary Fellow of London South Bank University and of King’s College London. He is a member of the UK Trade and Business Commission.

== Early life and education ==
Hughes was born in Bramhall on 17 May 1951 to James Henry Annesley Hughes, a brewer and his wife, Sylvia (née Ward). They had two sons, and Simon had two older half-brothers from his father’s previous marriage. They were a family of modest means, living in a tied house in Woodford owned by Whitbread and Co, the brewers with which Simon’s father worked in Stockport.

After his father was moved by Whitbread’s to Glamorgan, Simon won a scholarship to The Cathedral School, Llandaff, where he was confirmed into the disestablished Church in Wales and then chosen to be Dean's Scholar and Head Boy in 1964 He then won; a scholarship to Christ College, Brecon, where he also became Head Boy. After the family had moved to Herefordshire Simon took up a place at; Selwyn College, Cambridge, where he was President of the College JCR (student union) graduated in law in 1973; and then was called to the bar by the Inner Temple in 1974 before being awarded a government bursary for a European Studies postgraduate year at the College of Europe in Bruges, where he was a again a student union President and gained a Certificate of Advanced European Studies (equivalent to a master's degree).

He was then a trainee at the European Commission in Brussels and a human rights legal trainee and then employee at the Council of Europe in Strasbourg. Hughes moved back to the UK, to Camberwell, in 1977 for his pupillage and then practised as a barrister in London, the south-east and on the Midland and Oxford circuit. He stood as a Liberal candidate for Bermondsey in the 1981 GLC election, and a candidate for Southwark Council in the 1982 borough elections, coming runner-up both times. He moved to Bermondsey in 1983. In 1992, Hughes oldest brother, Richard, died after contracting Malaria during his honeymoon.

== Bermondsey ==
Hughes was first elected to Parliament in the Bermondsey by-election of 24 February 1983, in which he defeated Labour candidate and gay rights campaigner Peter Tatchell. The by-election was described by Gay News as "the dirtiest and most notorious by-election in British political history" because of the slurs against Tatchell's character by various opposing campaigners. A Liberal campaign leaflet described the sixteen-candidate election as "a straight choice" between Simon Hughes and the Labour candidate. Hughes won the seat with 57.7% of the vote.

In 2006, after being outed by ‘The Sun’ newspaper, Hughes apologised for the 1983 campaign at the same time as revealing that he had had homosexual experiences, and stating that he was bisexual.Hughes told the BBC's Newsnight programme: "I hope that there will never be that sort of campaign again. I have never been comfortable about the whole of that campaign, as Peter knows, and I said that to him in the past ... Where there were things that were inappropriate or wrong, I apologise for that."

In an apparent attempt to bring the controversy over the 1983 Bermondsey byelection to a close, Peter Tatchell formally endorsed Simon Hughes for Liberal Democrat leader on 25 January 2006, saying: "Simon Hughes is the best of the Lib Dem leadership candidates. If I was a party member, he'd get my vote. I want to see a stronger lead on social justice and green issues. Despite his recent drift to the centre, Simon is the contender most likely to move the Liberal Democrats in a progressive direction." In the same statement, Tatchell added: "Since his election, Simon has redeemed himself by voting for gay equality. That's all that matters now. He should be judged on his policies, not his private life."

However, Hughes subsequently chose to abstain at third reading on the Marriage (Same Sex Couples) Bill As a long-time supporter of same sex marriage, he had earlier voted for the second reading, but then also backed what was seen as a "wrecking amendment" and expressed the view that marriage was "traditionally ordained by God as between one man and one woman" and that therefore civil marriage and faith-based marriage should be differentiated and separated in law.

At the 1983 general election, held a matter of months after the by-election victory, the constituency had been redrawn as Southwark and Bermondsey. By the 1997 election it had been redrawn again, as North Southwark and Bermondsey, with a further change prior to the 2010 election from when the seat has been named Bermondsey and Old Southwark.

The election result in North Southwark and Bermondsey in the 2005 general election was a worse one for Hughes than those he had achieved in many previous battles. He held the seat, but the Labour Party saw a 5.9% swing in its favour—the biggest UK swing to Labour. When interviewed on election night television by Jeremy Paxman, Hughes suggested that the fall in his vote might reflect the unpopularity of Southwark Council, which had been led by the Liberal Democrats since 2002. However, in 2010 Hughes won a record majority of 8,530.

Hughes lost the seat in 2015 to Labour's Neil Coyle, after being an MP for over 32 years. He stood again at the 2017 general election in his former seat, gaining 18,189 votes, but was defeated for the second time by Coyle, who polled 31,161 votes, a majority of 12,972. Hughes stood down as a parliamentary candidate in September 2018.

== Political and parliamentary career ==
Hughes first joined the Liberal Party in 1971, when he signed up to Cambridge University Liberal Club as a student. As part of the SDP–Liberal Alliance, he was spokesman in parliament for the environment from 1983 to 1988. Along with the majority of Liberals, he joined the newly founded Liberal Democrats in 1988, acting as spokesman for education until 1992, then the environment again until 1994, then health until 1997, and then home affairs until 2003. He was the Liberal Democrat candidate in the 2004 Mayor of London elections and came in third with 284,647 votes, 15.22% of the first preference vote.

In 1986, Hughes—along with two other MPs, Archy Kirkwood and Michael Meadowcroft, the Young Liberals (NLYL) and other parts of the party—produced Across the Divide: Liberal Values on Defence and Disarmament. This publication acted as the rallying call that defeated the party leadership in the debate over the issue of an independent nuclear deterrent. Many believe it was Hughes' speech that won the day for the rebels by 23 votes.

Hughes was active for years in the Anti-Apartheid Movement and among party offices was President of the National League of Young Liberals and Vice-President of the Liberal Democrat Christian Forum. He has stated that "the present constitutional arrangements for making English decisions are unacceptable and need to be changed." He was a member of the centre-left Beveridge Group within the Liberal Democrats.

After the1997murder of 17year old Jamie Robe in Rotherhithe in Hughes’s constituency, and Hughes’s locating and supporting witnesses and giving evidence at trial, a threat on Hughes’s life led to the highest round-the-clock Special Branch protection. The 2004 television film ‘Wall of Silence’ with James Nesbitt is based on the Jamie Robe killing and investigation.

Hughes was later an important figure in the successful fight for asylum for a young gay man, Mehdi Kazemi, so he would not be deported to his homeland Iran where he would almost certainly have been executed, as his boyfriend had been, Kazemi thanked Hughes in a 2008 letter to people across the world who fought to prevent deportation: "I would like to say thank you to my local MP, Mr Simon Hughes, and his team who gave me the chance to live and made a miracle happen when he heard that my life was in serious danger and asked the Home Office to suspend my deportation in December 2006. I would not be here if it hadn’t been for his intervention. He was here for me then and he was here for me again when I was eventually sent back to the UK in April this year. I do not know if I would have been granted my refugee status without him."

In December 2010 Hughes was appointed by the Prime Minister and Deputy Prime Minister as the Advocate for Access to Education and delivered his recommendations to the PM and DPM in July 2011, which were welcomed by the Department for Business, Innovation and Skills.

In 2012-13 Hughes was investigated by the Parliamentary Commissioner for Standards for failing to declare a £10,000 donation from a scrap metals company, Southwark Metals, to his local party. There was no suggestion that Mr Hughes benefited personally from the donation. The commissioner found that none of the breaches of the rules was intentional and that there was no attempt to conceal any donations. Simon Hughes apologised to parliament for his mistakes.

In December 2013, Hughes was appointed Minister of State for Justice and Civil Liberties, following the resignation of Lord McNally who had become Chair of the Youth Justice Board. Hughes announced he would stand down as Deputy Leader of the Liberal Democrats once a successor was elected, as a result of an earlier decision that the Deputy Leader should not hold any office in the coalition government.

In January 2014 Hughes was named by the PM as a UK Holocaust Commission member

=== Leadership elections, 1999 and 2006 ===
Main article: 2006 Liberal Democrats leadership election

In 1999, when Paddy Ashdown announced his resignation as Liberal Democrat leader Hughes was one of six candidates to succeed him. Hughes came runner-up to Charles Kennedy - with 43% of the vote. On 12 January 2006, Hughes announced his candidacy in the leadership election triggered by the resignation of Charles Kennedy. He had initially delayed any announcement while carrying out presidential responsibilities in drawing up the timetable for the contest. Speaking to reporters he said: "What I have to offer is my ambition, enthusiasm and passion. ... What I have to offer is my experience over many years in Parliament and campaigning around the country to motivate people to join us."

After revelation about Hughes' long-rumoured sexuality, which came four days after Mark Oaten had resigned from the Liberal Democrat front bench and given up on the leadership race, Peter Tatchell confirmed his view that, despite the 1983 Bermondsey incidents: "I hope Simon is elected as party leader because of all the contenders he is the most progressive on human rights, social justice and environmental issues."

Hughes apologised after his outing by The Sun, saying "I gave a reply that wasn't untrue but was clearly misleading and I apologise." He also admitted during the Question Time leadership candidate debate on BBC One on 9 February that he hadn't handled the matter very well.

Hughes campaigned under a slogan of "Freedom, fairness and sustainability". His manifesto was also released in PDF format, and was available from his campaign website. Of the three candidates in the contest, he was generally considered the most left wing.

The campaign was marked by a series of hustings around the UK, including . in Edinburgh, where Hughes stressed his human rights and green-friendly backgroundin Manchester. and in London

He said he was proud to have played some part in the success of the Liberal Democrats across the country.In this campaign, Hughes came third in the ballot of party members with 12,081 votes, behind Campbell and Huhne. In the autumn of 2007, as speculation over Menzies Campbell's leadership continued, Simon Hughes publicly criticised him in a GMTV interview, stating that he had to do better.

=== Deputy leadership election, 2010 ===
The 2010 general election, held on 6 May 2010, was the first since 1974 to result in a hung parliament—with the Conservative Party having the most votes and seats, but no party having an overall majority. On 11 May 2010, Labour Party leader and prime minister Gordon Brown announced his resignation, which allowed David Cameron to become Prime Minister, after forming a coalition with the Liberal Democrats.

Among the Liberal Democrat MPs to be given roles in the cabinet was the deputy party leader Vince Cable, who became Business Secretary and resigned from his role as deputy party leader. Cable's resignation as deputy leader caused a deputy leadership election, with Hughes defeating Tim Farron by 38 votes to 18.

== Personal life ==
Outside politics, Hughes is a supporter of Millwall Football Club, Glamorgan County Cricket Club and the Wales national rugby union team

Hughes has never married, although in an interview with The Daily Telegraph in 2006, he said he had been turned down by "several women". He denied persistent rumours about his sexuality, when asked if he was gay, saying "The answer is no, as it happens, but if it were the case, which it isn't, I hope that it would not be an issue." Two days later, in an interview with The Independent he again denied being gay, and later in an interview with The Guardian he repeated the denial.

On 26 January 2006, after The Sun newspaper told him that they had proof that he had used a gay chat service known as 'Man Talk', Hughes admitted that in the past he had had relationships with both women and men.

Referring to his change from previous denials about his sexuality and recent Liberal Democrat difficulties he said, "I hope that any colleague in any party at any time who might not have been entirely honest for good reason or who may have made a mistake is accepted back at the right time", and also "I gave a reply that wasn't untrue but was clearly misleading. I apologise." He confirmed to PinkNews that he is bisexual.

In an interview broadcast on the same day on BBC Radio 5 Live, when asked if he considered quitting the race for leadership of his party, Hughes replied: "Of course. I considered also whether I should stand in the first place. It is a balance I have always had to take."

Since 2010 Hughes successfully sued the News Of The World and later The Sun newspapers for unlawful voicemail interception. However in July 2026, Hughes was among seven well-known figures who lost a High Court privacy case against Associated Newspapers (ANL) the publisher of the Daily Mail and The Mail on Sunday. In August 2026, Mr Justice Nicklin, ruled that Hughes along with the other six claimants pay an initial £9.54 million to the publishers ANL, by 28 August, as part of their potential future liability of up to £34.5 million following an "exceptional order" for ANL's legal costs. Hughes told the BBC that he was "disappointed" with the ruling and is considering his legal options. His case had related to privacy issues and investigations authorised by ANL related to his sexuality.

Hughes once appeared on Top of the Pops.

== Honours ==
On 13 May 2010 Hughes was sworn in as a member of the Privy Council. This gave him the Honorific Prefix "The Right Honourable" for Life. In the 2015 Queen's Birthday Honours List, Hughes was knighted "for public and political service".

== See also ==
- Liberal Democrat frontbench team

Parliament of the United Kingdom
| Preceded by Bob Mellish | Member of Parliament for Bermondsey; 1983 | Constituency abolished |
| New constituency | Member of Parliament for Southwark and Bermondsey; 1983–1997 | Constituency abolished |
| New constituency | Member of Parliament for North Southwark and Bermondsey; 1997–2010 | Constituency abolished |
| New constituency | Member of Parliament for Bermondsey and Old Southwark; 2010–2015 | Succeeded by Neil Coyle |
Party political offices
| Preceded by Navnit Dholakia | President of the Liberal Democrats; 2004–2008 | Succeeded by The Baroness Scott of Needham Market |
| Preceded by Vince Cable | Deputy Leader of the Liberal Democrats; 2010–2014 | Succeeded by Malcolm Bruce |
