= Mark Oaten =

British politician (born 1964)

Liberal Democrat Home Affairs Spokesman
- In office 12 June 2003 – 21 January 2006
- Leader: Charles Kennedy
- Preceded by: Simon Hughes
- Succeeded by: Alistair Carmichael

Chair of the Liberal Democrats Parliamentary Party
- In office 7 June 2001 – 12 June 2003
- Leader: Charles Kennedy
- Preceded by: Malcolm Bruce
- Succeeded by: Matthew Taylor

Member of Parliament for Winchester
- In office 1 May 1997 – 12 April 2010
- Preceded by: Gerry Malone
- Succeeded by: Steve Brine

Personal details
- Born: 8 March 1964 (age 62) Watford, England
- Party: Liberal Democrats (1988–2018; 2019–present)
- Other political affiliations: Social Democratic Party (before 1988)
- Spouse: Belinda (former)
- Children: 2
- Education: University of Hertfordshire

Mark Oaten (born 8 March 1964) is a British politician who was a senior member of the Liberal Democrats. He served as the Member of Parliament (MP) for Winchester from 1997 to 2010.

Born in Watford, Hertfordshire, Oaten became a councillor in local government, joining the centre-left Social Democratic Party, which merged with the Liberal Party to form the Liberal Democrats in 1988. He became the party's Home Affairs spokesman in 2003. He stood for the position of Leader of the Liberal Democrats in 2006, but withdrew from the contest. He was later hit by a series of scandals which also led to his resignation as Home Affairs spokesman. He did not seek re-election to the House of Commons at the 2010 general election.

Following his retirement from active politics, Oaten published two books, before becoming executive of the International Fur Trade Federation in 2011.

== Early life ==
Oaten was educated at Queens' School, Bushey and the University of Hertfordshire.

Before entering Parliament, Oaten had been a councillor and was employed as a lobbyist by various Westminster public affairs companies. He was leader of the SDP group on Watford Borough Council. He stood for the Watford seat at the 1992 general election and polled 10,231 votes, finishing in third place.

== Member of Parliament ==
Oaten won the Winchester seat in the 1997 election with a majority of two, but his election was later declared void by the Election Court. The defeated Conservative former MP Gerry Malone successfully challenged the election on the basis of an established precedent which voided the result where it had been affected by a decision not to count ballot papers which had not been properly stamped.

This decision caused the 1997 Winchester by-election at which Malone stood again. Oaten won with a majority of 21,556, gaining 68% of the vote. He held the seat in the 2001 election, with a majority of 9,634 (with a 54.6% share of the vote), and again in 2005, although his majority dropped to 7,473 (a 50.6% share of the vote).

=== Liberal Democrat leadership contest 2006 ===
On 10 January 2006, Oaten declared that he would be a candidate in the leadership election to replace Charles Kennedy, standing on an agenda of making liberalism relevant to the twenty-first century. He was widely rumoured to be Kennedy's favoured successor but his campaign failed to gain momentum. On 18 January, he became embroiled in a row about the leaking of an email.

On 19 January, Oaten withdrew from the contest, having failed to attract support from within the parliamentary party; his sole supporters were Lembit Öpik MP and Sarah Ludford, Baroness Ludford, a peer and MEP. He concluded his withdrawal statement with the words "Next week I'll be giving some thought to where I go politically and giving my thoughts on the future of the Party."

=== Scandal and resignation ===
On 21 January 2006, Oaten resigned from the Liberal Democrat front bench when it was revealed by the News of the World that he had hired a 23-year-old male prostitute between the summer of 2004 and February 2005. The newspaper also alleged that Oaten had engaged in 'three-in-a-bed' sex sessions with two male prostitutes. Further allegations surfaced in the media over the following days, including an accusation that he had asked one of the prostitutes to engage in an act of coprophilia.

Oaten gave an explanation for his actions in an essay in The Sunday Times in which he said a "mid-life crisis" was partly responsible for his actions. In 2009 he gave an interview to Press Gazette, in which he said "Journalists ... had my story for three years I think, but hung on to it and never did anything with it. They could have made that public interest argument at any point in the three years. I had always been a Member of Parliament, but they waited until it could sell most newspapers, at the point at which I became well-known and at my most famous."

Oaten announced that he would be standing down from Parliament at the 2010 general election. The members of his Winchester constituency party selected Martin Tod to replace Oaten as the Liberal Democrat candidate, but Tod was defeated at the general election by the Conservative candidate Steve Brine.

=== Retirement ===
After his retirement from frontline politics, Oaten released two books, one on the history of coalition governments, and the other a memoir entitled Screwing Up: How One MP Survived Politics, Scandal and Turning 40. In 2018, he resigned from the Liberal Democrats after being a member for thirty years but announced that he had rejoined them in September 2019 to "help defeat the new extremes growing in politics".

In the 2023 United Kingdom local elections Oaten stood unsuccessfully for the Liberal Democrats in the Severn Vale Ward of South Gloucestershire Council, receiving 1,435 votes.

== Political leaning ==
Oaten was a member of the Advisory Board of the Liberal Future think tank until it was wound up in 2005, and one of the contributors to The Orange Book: Reclaiming Liberalism in 2004—although he attracted anger from the book's co-authors at its launch event at the Lib Dem Conference in spring 2004 when he refused to answer questions about his own chapter, stating that it had actually been written by his research assistant, and that he had not even read it. Within the party, Oaten had been called a moderniser in the sense that he was keen to emphasise economic liberalism and to prevent the Liberal Democrats being sidelined as a 'party of the left'. As the party's principal home affairs spokesman, he championed the rights of asylum seekers and civil liberties.

== Tower Block of Commons ==
In February 2010 Channel 4 broadcast a four-part series called Tower Block of Commons in which four MPs lived briefly on different council estates in England. Taking part alongside Oaten were Tim Loughton, Austin Mitchell and Nadine Dorries.

== International Fur Trade Federation ==
In 2011 Oaten accepted a position as executive of the International Fur Trade Federation. Whilst an MP, Oaten was critical of any plans to introduce legislation to outlaw fox hunting, and supported a 'middle way' approach to the issue, that would allow hunting to remain legal. In 2004 Oaten voted against the ban on fox hunting.

== Personal life ==
In an interview on BBC Radio 5 Live with Emma Barnett in 2019, Oaten came out as gay and revealed he was in a relationship. He was previously married to his wife, Belinda, with whom he had two daughters.

== Publications ==
- Coalition: The Politics and Personalities of Coalition Government from 1850, Harriman House Publishing, 2007
- Screwing Up: How One MP Survived Politics, Scandal and Turning 40, Biteback Publishing Ltd, 2009

Parliament of the United Kingdom
Preceded by Gerry Malone	Member of Parliament for Winchester; 1997–2010	Succeeded by Steve Brine
Party political offices
Preceded by Malcolm Bruce	Chairman of the Liberal Democrats; 2001–2003	Succeeded by Matthew Taylor
