= Jenny Tonge, Baroness Tonge =

British Independent politician, life peer (born 1941)

The Right Honourable The Baroness Tonge
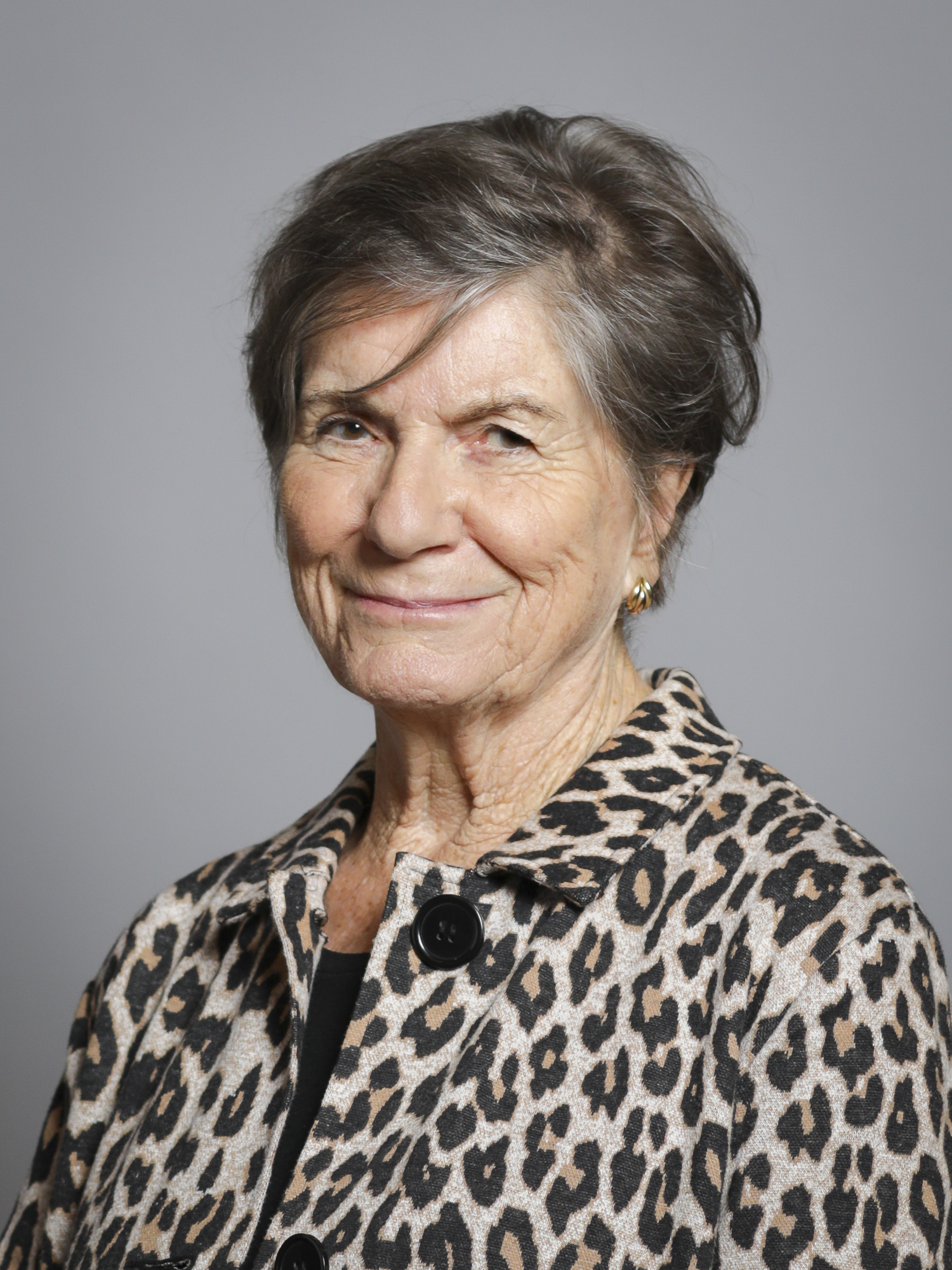

Member of the House of Lords
- Lord Temporal
- Life peerage 23 June 2005 – 19 February 2021

Member of Parliament for Richmond Park
- In office 2 May 1997 – 11 April 2005
- Preceded by: Constituency established
- Succeeded by: Susan Kramer

Personal details
- Born: Jennifer Louise Smith; 19 February 1941 (age 85) Walsall, England, UK
- Party: Independent (2016–present)
- Other political affiliations: Liberal Party (1959–88); Liberal Democrats (1988–2012); Independent Liberal Democrat (2012–2016)
- Spouse: Keith Tonge (m. 1964–2013, his death)
- Children: 3
- Education: University College, London

Jennifer Louise Tonge, Baroness Tonge (née Smith; born 19 February 1941) is a British politician. She was Member of Parliament (MP) for Richmond Park from 1997 to 2005. In June 2005 she was made a life peer as Baroness Tonge, of Kew in the London Borough of Richmond upon Thames, which entitled her to a seat in the House of Lords.

Critical of Israel and vocal in support of the Palestinian cause, controversial acts and comments led to accusations of antisemitism and to her eventual suspension from the Liberal Democrats group in the Lords in 2012, then her suspension and resignation from the party itself in October 2016. She sat as an independent in the Lords from 2012 until her retirement in 2021.

== Early life ==
Born in Walsall, Staffordshire, her parents were both schoolteachers. She attended Dudley Girls High School from 1951 to 1959. She trained to be a doctor at University College Hospital, gaining an MB and BS in 1964.

She is also MFFP (Membership of the Faculty of Family Planning and Reproductive Health Care of the RCOG). She holds an honorary FFFP. From 1968–78, she worked in General Practice and Family Planning. From 1980 to 1985, she worked as Senior Medical Officer in Women's Services in Ealing. She was a manager of Community Health Services in Ealing from 1992 to 1996.

Tonge was a councillor in the London Borough of Richmond upon Thames from 1981 to 1990, and served as chair of the Social Services Committee. She stood as the Liberal Democrat candidate for the Richmond and Barnes constituency at the 1992 general election. It was considered to be the party's most winnable seat, but Tonge was not elected.

== Parliamentary career ==
=== Member of Parliament ===
==== Election and PMQs ====
At the 1997 general election she was elected to Parliament, representing Richmond Park. While in the House of Commons, she was Liberal Democrat spokesperson on International Development from 1997 to 2003, and then the party spokesperson for children from 2003 to 2004.

In 2002, during the Emmanuel College creationism controversy, she asked Prime Minister Tony Blair whether he was "happy to allow the teaching of creationism alongside Darwin's theory of evolution in state schools". Blair replied that he supported a "diverse school system", and praised the teachers at Emmanuel College for their commitments to "deliver[ing] better results for our children". Tonge was concerned about Blair's response, because it implied the government was "prepared to accept money from anybody, regardless of the doctrine or religious beliefs of the donor".

==== Visit to Gaza Strip ====
In 2003 Tonge and the Labour Party MP Oona King visited the Gaza Strip. At a subsequent press conference after their return, Tonge compared living conditions for Palestinians in the Gaza Strip to conditions Jews had suffered in the Warsaw Ghetto during the Second World War. Tonge said "You are almost getting a situation like the Warsaw ghetto. People can't get in or out. They can't work, they can't sell anything. There is this gradual squeeze", adding, "It was an apartheid system." Tonge recommended economic sanctions be applied against Israel and for European Union or United Nations troops be sent to Gaza. Tonge and King claimed that an Israeli soldier wielding a grenade had confronted them when they tried to leave the Gaza Strip.

Yad Vashem museum chair Avner Shalev criticised Tonge and King for making the comparison with conditions under Nazi rule.

==== Palestinian suicide bombers ====
In January 2004 Tonge was dismissed as the Liberal Democrat children's spokeswoman by the party leader, Charles Kennedy. At a pro-Palestinian parliamentary meeting, Tonge had said of Palestinian suicide bombers: "If I had to live in that situation – and I say that advisedly – I might just consider becoming one myself". She repeated her comments on Sky News, but added, "I do not condone suicide bombers, nobody can condone them". Tonge refused to apologise, commenting "I was just trying to say how, having seen the violence and the humiliation and the provocation that the Palestinian people live under every day and have done since their land was occupied by Israel, I could understand".

Kennedy said her comments were "completely unacceptable" and "not compatible with Liberal Democrat party policies and principles", adding "there can be no justification, under any circumstances for taking innocent lives through terrorism". Tonge said that suicide bombers' actions are "appalling and loathsome" but that "we have to try and understand where they are coming from and understand the situation in which they live."

Tonge retired from the House of Commons at the 2005 general election, and was made a life peer and member of the House of Lords later in the year.

=== Life peer ===
==== Allegations about the Israel lobby ====
Tonge remarked at a Liberal Democrat Conference fringe meeting in September 2006: "The pro-Israeli lobby has got its grips on the Western world, its financial grips. I think they've probably got a grip on our party". In response the party leader, Sir Menzies Campbell, wrote to Tonge, commenting that her unacceptable assertion had "clear anti-Semitic connotations". An all-party group of peers led by the former Archbishop of Canterbury, George Carey, said, in a letter to The Times, that "the language deployed by Baroness Tonge, as a member of the House of Lords, was irresponsible and inappropriate". At a later meeting at Edinburgh University the following November, Tonge said that professors Stephen Walt and John Mearsheimer's article "The Israel Lobby and U.S. Foreign Policy", which appeared in the 23 March 2006 issue of the London Review of Books, supported her assertion that the "Israel lobby had a disproportionate voice in Anglo-American foreign policy". She said her comments "were about the Israeli lobby in politics. They were a big distance from being about Jewishness or anti-Semitism".

==== The Gaza strip and other issues ====
In November 2008 Tonge visited the Gaza Strip again, this time with Lord Ahmed, Clare Short and members of the European Parliament.

From 8 January 2009 to 12 February 2010 Tonge was the Liberal Democrat Spokesperson for Health. On 12 January 2009 she asked in the House of Lords about investigations into alleged Israeli war crimes in the December 2009–January 2010 Gaza War, saying:

Is the Minister aware that Mrs Pillay, the new UN High Commissioner for Human Rights, has spoken of war crimes being committed in Gaza? Will the Government, therefore, show leadership and call for the immediate—and I mean immediate—establishment by the United Nations Security Council of an independent fact-finding commission to Palestine to investigate all breaches of international law?

In March 2009 Tonge joined a six-person delegation of British politicians which met with the Hamas political leader Khaled Meshaal in Syria. Tonge told an interviewer that their goal was to force the British government to talk to Hamas and press the United States to do likewise. She stated: "You don't make peace by talking to your friends. You make peace by talking to your enemies", and said she knew that her meeting with Meshaal might be considered illegal and lead to her arrest. "That is one of the risks that you take", she said.

During the 2008–2009 Gaza War Tonge spoke at a London rally against the war, saying: "It is a disgusting, obscene outrage what is going on in Gaza". She said that eventually activists must look to "a full trade embargo and boycotting everything Israeli".

On 1 February 2010 The Palestine Telegraph, of which Tonge was then a patron, published an article which made false claims that an Israel Defense Forces emergency aid hospital in Haiti (deployed in the aftermath the 2010 Haiti earthquake) was secretly harvesting organs and selling them on the black market, based partly on a report made on Hezbollah's Al-Manar television which cited a YouTube video produced by a group called AfriSynergy Productions. The video did not cite any evidence, nor did it portray any actual organ removal. She later resigned as a patron of The Palestine Telegraph after it published a video of an interview with David Duke, the former leader of the Ku Klux Klan.

On 11 February 2010 The Jewish Chronicle published an article containing a statement by Tonge which congratulated the IDF on its swift and generous response to the emergency in Haiti, and said: "To prevent allegations such as these—which have already been posted on YouTube—going any further, the IDF and the Israeli Medical Association [sic] should establish an independent inquiry immediately to clear the names of the team in Haiti."

On 12 February 2010 Liberal Democrat leader Nick Clegg removed her from her position as health spokeswoman in the House of Lords, calling the comments "wrong, distasteful and provocative". The released statement said she had apologised "unreservedly" for any offence she had caused and that neither Clegg nor Tonge gave the allegations "any credence whatsoever". In an email message sent to an anti-Israel activist, Tonge wrote that she had called for an inquiry to dispel any rumours and that the idea that organs could be being harvested in the situation which existed in Haiti was ludicrous and nonsense.

==== Comments about Israel and the Gaza strip ====
In 2012 Tonge appeared at an Israeli Apartheid Week talk at Middlesex University on 23 February 2012, during which she said: "Beware Israel. Israel is not going to be there forever in its present form. One day, the United States of America will get sick of giving £70bn a year to Israel to support what I call America's aircraft carrier in the Middle East – that is Israel. One day, the American people are going to say to the Israel lobby in the USA: enough is enough. Israel will lose support and then they will reap what they have sown." A party spokesman said: "Jenny Tonge does not speak for the party on Israel and Palestine. Her presence and comments at this event were extremely ill-advised and ill-judged. The tone of the debate at this event was wholly unacceptable and adds nothing to the peace process. The Liberal Democrats are wholehearted supporters of a peaceful two state solution to the Israel- Palestine issue".

Baroness Tonge resigned the Liberal Democrats whip position immediately after being given an ultimatum by party leader Nick Clegg to apologise or resign for her remarks. From this point onwards, she sat in the House of Lords as an independent Liberal Democrat.

She spoke at a London rally at the Israeli Embassy against the Israeli blockade of the Gaza Strip and the November 2012 Israeli bombings of Gaza in retaliation for militant rocket attacks on Israel.

In January 2015 the New York Jewish newspaper Algemeiner Journal described Tonge as having "a long record of inflammatory, often anti-Semitic, statements against both Israel and the British Jewish leadership" in discussing a written question she had tabled in the Lords, which urged for "Jewish faith leaders in the United Kingdom publicly to condemn settlement building by Israel".

Jonathan Sacerdoti of the Campaign Against Antisemitism told the Algemeiner: "It is despicable to see her using the House of Lords to try to harass Jewish people". In July 2016, Tonge repeated her call for British Jews to condemn Israel resulting in calls from Campaign Against Antisemitism for her to be expelled from the Liberal Democrats.

Following Jeremy Corbyn's election as Leader of the Labour Party, Tonge said that she was considering joining Labour, having not seen the party as left-wing enough until then. Tonge expressed support for Corbyn and the former Labour MP Tony Benn: "I marched alongside Tony Benn and Jeremy Corbyn, one on either side. I went to Gaza with Jeremy Corbyn and we met Hamas leaders together". Deputy Labour Leader Tom Watson said Tonge would be "welcome" in the party.

Tonge chaired a meeting of the Palestine Return Council at the House of Lords on 25 October 2016 to launch a campaign for Britain to apologise for the Balfour Declaration, which advocated a home for Jews in Palestine, ahead of its hundredth anniversary in 2017. Jennifer Gerber, the director of Labour Friends of Israel told The Jewish Chronicle about the absence of any "reproach or redress from Baroness Tonge as chair" at the gathering, at which "attendees compared Israel to ISIS and claimed Jews 'provoked' their own genocide. Silence in the face of such abhorrence amounts to tacit endorsement". Tonge was suspended by the Liberal Democrats, and then resigned from the party on 27 October 2016. Speaking about London's Israeli embassy at the time, she commented: "They are attacking the Lib Dems as they do Labour. They like to be in control of things".

In October 2018 Tonge faced calls to resign over a post she made on Facebook in the aftermath of the Pittsburgh synagogue shooting, in which she claimed that the Israeli government's actions towards Palestinians may have contributed to a rise in anti-Semitism. Tonge made a similar comment in January 2021 during a House of Lords debate concerning rising anti-Semitic incidents in universities, saying "The victims are innocent Jewish people—students, in this case. They are victims because of the illegal actions of the Israeli government."

==== Population, health and development ====
Tonge is strongly in favour of stem cell research and has stated so in the House of Lords. She is pro-choice on abortion and has supported assisted suicide laws in the United Kingdom.

Tonge was chair of the All Party Parliamentary Group on Population, Development and Reproductive Health for five years, which in November 2012 issued a report on child marriage, A Childhood Lost, which urged the British government to act to stop child marriage in Britain and abroad.

This followed other reports on Maternal Morbidity, "Better off Dead", and most recently, a new report has been published on Population Dynamics and Sustainable Development. She was President of the European Parliamentary Forum on Population and Development from 2011-15. In November 2015 she was made an Honorary Fellow of the Royal College of Obstetricians and Gynaecologists for services to women's health in the UK and in developing countries.

== Personal life ==
Tonge met her future husband, Dr Keith Tonge, in 1959, at university. The couple married on 23 May 1964 in Tipton. He was a consultant neuroradiologist, formerly at St Thomas's Hospital in Lambeth; they have two surviving grown children and seven grandchildren. Keith Tonge died on 5 July 2013. Tonge's daughter died by accidental electrocution in 2004.

She lives in Kew and owns property in Hérault, southern France.

Parliament of the United Kingdom
New constituency	Member of Parliament for Richmond Park; 1997–2005	Succeeded by Susan Kramer
