= List of United Kingdom MPs by seniority (2010–2015) =

This is the list of United Kingdom MPs by seniority, 2010–2015. The Members of Parliament (MPs) are ranked by the beginning of their terms in office, in the House of Commons.

The constituencies and party affiliations listed reflect those during the 55th Parliament. Seats and party affiliations for other Parliaments will be different for certain members.

The House of Commons of the 55th Parliament was elected on 6 May 2010 and first met on 18 May 2010. Under the Fixed-term Parliaments Act 2011 (as amended) the next general election was on 7 May 2015 (although an early election or one delayed by up to two months would have been possible in certain circumstances). The formal dissolution of this Parliament took place on 30 March 2015.

This article describes the criteria for seniority in the House of Commons, as set out in Factsheet M3 (The Father of the House) issued by the House of Commons Information Office and revised in June 2010.

== Seniority criteria ==
The criteria for seniority, used in this article, are derived from the way that the Father of the House is selected. They are not laid down in Standing Orders but arise from the customary practice of the House of Commons.

The modern custom is that the Father of the House is the MP who has the longest continuous service. If two or more members were first elected in the same General Election (or at by-elections held on the same day), then priority is given to the one who was sworn in first. The order of swearing in is recorded in Hansard, the official record of proceedings.

When a member has had broken service, that does not affect his or her seniority (for the purpose of qualifying as the Father of the House) which is based on the latest period of continuous service.

The Sinn Féin members, who abstain from taking their seats at Westminster, have never been sworn in. They are ranked (in this list) after all other members who have taken their seats. Between themselves they are ranked by the first date of election, for the current period of continuous service. If that criterion is equal, then they are ranked by alphabetical order of surnames.

In the House of Commons, the sole mandatory duty of the Father of the House is to preside over the election of a new Speaker whenever that office becomes vacant. The relevant Standing Order does not refer to this member by the title "Father of the House", referring instead to the longest-serving member of the House present who is not a Minister of the Crown (meaning that if the Father is absent or a government minister, the next person in line presides).

== Summary of members elected by party ==
Affiliation	Members	
Affiliation	After 2010 general election	At dissolution of Parliament
Conservative	306	302
Labour	258	256
Liberal Democrats	57	56
DUP	8	8
SNP	6	6
Independent	1	5
Sinn Féin	5	5
Plaid Cymru	3	3
SDLP	3	3
UKIP	0	2
Alliance	1	1
Green	1	1
Respect	0	1
Speaker	1	1
Total number of seats	650	650
Actual government majority	83	73

Notes

- See here for a full list of changes during the fifty-fifth Parliament.
- The actual government majority is calculated as Conservative and Liberal Democrat MPs less all other parties. This calculation excludes the Speaker, Deputy Speakers (two Labour and one Conservative) and Sinn Féin.

== List of Members of Parliament by seniority ==
This article assigns a numerical rank to each of the members elected in the 2010 general election and subsequent by-elections, except for those who were elected but never sworn in, who are displayed at the bottom without a number. Members shaded in pink ceased to be MPs during the course of the parliament.

Rank	Member	Party	Constituency 2010	Elected	Notes
44th Parliament (elected: 31 March 1966, first met: 18 April 1966, dissolved: 29 May 1970)
001	Sir Peter Tapsell	C	Louth and Horncastle	31 March 1966	Previously served 1959–64. Father of the House.
45th Parliament (elected: 18 June 1970, first met: 29 June 1970, dissolved: 8 February 1974)
002	Sir Gerald Kaufman	Lab	Manchester Gorton	18 June 1970	
003	Kenneth Clarke	C	Rushcliffe	18 June 1970	
004	Michael Meacher	Lab	Oldham West and Royton	18 June 1970	
005	Dennis Skinner	Lab	Bolsover	18 June 1970	
006	Sir Alan Beith	LD	Berwick-upon-Tweed	8 November 1973	
46th Parliament (elected: 28 February 1974, first met: 6 March 1974, dissolved: 20 September 1974)
007	Sir George Young, Bt	C	North West Hampshire	28 February 1974	Leader of the House of Commons (12 May 2010 – 4 September 2012). Chief Whip, C (19 October 2012 – 14 July 2014).
008	Sir John Stanley	C	Tonbridge and Malling	28 February 1974	
47th Parliament (elected: 10 October 1974, first met: 22 October 1974, dissolved: 7 April 1979)
009	(Sir) Peter Bottomley	C	Worthing West	26 June 1975	
010	Geoffrey Robinson	Lab	Coventry North West	4 March 1976	
011	Austin Mitchell	Lab	Great Grimsby	28 April 1977	
012	Sir Alan Haselhurst	C	Saffron Walden	7 July 1977	Previously served 1970–74
48th Parliament (elected: 3 May 1979, first met: 9 May 1979, dissolved: 13 May 1983)
013	David Winnick	Lab	Walsall North	3 May 1979	Previously served 1966–70
014	Barry Sheerman	Lab	Huddersfield	3 May 1979	
015	Frank Field	Lab	Birkenhead	3 May 1979	
016	Frank Dobson	Lab	Holborn and St Pancras	3 May 1979	
017	(Sir) Richard Shepherd	C	Aldridge-Brownhills	3 May 1979	
018	Stephen Dorrell	C	Charnwood	3 May 1979	
019	Jack Straw	Lab	Blackburn	3 May 1979	
020	Tom Clarke	Lab	Coatbridge, Chryston and Bellshill	24 June 1982	
021	Harriet Harman	Lab	Camberwell and Peckham	28 October 1982	Deputy Leader, Lab. Leader of the Opposition (11 May-25 September 2010).
022	Simon Hughes	LD	Bermondsey and Old Southwark	24 February 1983	Deputy Leader, LD (9 June 2010 – 28 January 2014)
49th Parliament (elected: 9 June 1983, first met: 15 June 1983, dissolved: 18 May 1987)
023	Sir Stuart Bell	Lab	Middlesbrough	9 June 1983	Died: 13 October 2012
024	(Sir) Kevin Barron	Lab	Rother Valley	9 June 1983	
025	Tony Lloyd	Lab	Manchester Central	9 June 1983	Resigned: 22 October 2012
026	(Sir) Edward Leigh	C	Gainsborough	9 June 1983	
027	Nick Brown	Lab	Newcastle upon Tyne East	9 June 1983	Chief Whip, Lab (2008-7 October 2010)
028	Jeremy Corbyn	Lab	Islington North	9 June 1983	
029	(Sir) David Amess	C	Southend West	9 June 1983	
030	(Sir) Roger Gale	C	North Thanet	9 June 1983	
031	Peter Lilley	C	Hitchin and Harpenden	9 June 1983	
032	(Sir) Nicholas Soames	C	Mid Sussex	9 June 1983	
033	Tim Yeo	C	South Suffolk	9 June 1983	
034	Charles Kennedy	LD	Ross, Skye and Lochaber	9 June 1983	
035	(Sir) Tony Baldry	C	Banbury	9 June 1983	
036	(Sir) Malcolm Bruce	LD	Gordon	9 June 1983	Deputy Leader, LD (28 January 2014-)
037	(Dame) Margaret Beckett	Lab	Derby South	9 June 1983	Previously served 1974–79
038	Gordon Brown	Lab	Kirkcaldy and Cowdenbeath	9 June 1983	Leader, Lab and Prime Minister (2007-11 May 2010)
039	(Sir) Bill Cash	C	Stone	3 June 1984	
040	Ann Clwyd	Lab	Cynon Valley	3 June 1984	
041	Patrick McLoughlin	C	Derbyshire Dales	8 May 1986	Chief Whip, C (2005-4 September 2012)
042	George Howarth	Lab	Knowsley	13 November 1986	
50th Parliament (elected: 11 June 1987, first met: 17 June 1987, dissolved: 16 March 1992)
043	David Blunkett	Lab	Sheffield, Brightside and Hillsborough	11 June 1987	
044	John Redwood	C	Wokingham	11 June 1987	
045	Eric Illsley	Lab	Barnsley Central	11 June 1987	Suspended from party and whip withdrawn: 19 May 2010. Sat as Independent until resigned seat: 8 February 2011.
046	Alun Michael	Lab	Cardiff South and Penarth	11 June 1987	Resigned: 22 October 2012
047	Ronnie Campbell	Lab	Blyth Valley	11 June 1987	
048	David Davis	C	Haltemprice and Howden	11 June 1987	
049	(Sir) Alan Meale	Lab	Mansfield	11 June 1987	
050	David Tredinnick	C	Bosworth	11 June 1987	
051	Andrew Smith	Lab	Oxford East	11 June 1987	
052	Alistair Darling	Lab	Edinburgh South West	11 June 1987	
053	Simon Burns	C	Chelmsford	11 June 1987	
054	Keith Vaz	Lab	Leicester East	11 June 1987	
055	Paul Flynn	Lab	Newport West	11 June 1987	
056	Paul Murphy	Lab	Torfaen	11 June 1987	
057	Jimmy Hood	Lab	Lanark and Hamilton East	11 June 1987	
058	(Dame) Dawn Primarolo	Lab	Bristol South	11 June 1987	Deputy Speaker:2nd Dep. Ch., Ways and Means
059	Joan Walley	Lab	Stoke-on-Trent North	11 June 1987	
060	Graham Allen	Lab	Nottingham North	11 June 1987	
061	Julian Brazier	C	Canterbury	11 June 1987	
062	James Arbuthnot	C	North East Hampshire	11 June 1987	
063	(Dame) Joan Ruddock	Lab	Lewisham Deptford	11 June 1987	
064	(Sir) Jim Paice	C	South East Cambridgeshire	11 June 1987	
065	Diane Abbott	Lab	Hackney North and Stoke Newington	11 June 1987	
066	Sir Menzies Campbell	LD	North East Fife	11 June 1987	
067	William Hague	C	Richmond (Yorks)	23 February 1989	Leader of the House of Commons (15 July 2014-)
068	Kate Hoey	Lab	Vauxhall	15 June 1989	
069	Joe Benton	Lab	Bootle	8 November 1990	
070	Peter Hain	Lab	Neath	4 April 1991	
51st Parliament (elected: 9 April 1992, first met: 27 April 1992, dissolved: 8 April 1997)
071	Ian Davidson	Lab	Glasgow South West	9 April 1992	
072	Jim Cunningham	Lab	Coventry South	9 April 1992	
073	Michael Connarty	Lab	Linlithgow and East Falkirk	9 April 1992	
074	Don Foster	LD	Bath	9 April 1992	Chief Whip, LD (7 October 2013-)
075	Andrew Miller	Lab	Ellesmere Port and Neston	9 April 1992	
076	Richard Burden	Lab	Birmingham, Northfield	9 April 1992	
077	(Sir) Edward Garnier	C	Harborough	9 April 1992	
078	Liam Fox	C	North Somerset	9 April 1992	
079	David Lidington	C	Aylesbury	9 April 1992	
080	Oliver Heald	C	North East Hertfordshire	9 April 1992	
081	Geoffrey Clifton-Brown	C	The Cotswolds	9 April 1992	
082	David Hanson	Lab	Delyn	9 April 1992	
083	Hugh Bayley	Lab	York Central	9 April 1992	
084	Gary Streeter	C	South West Devon	9 April 1992	
085	(Sir) Peter Luff	C	Mid Worcestershire	9 April 1992	
086	Michael Fabricant	C	Lichfield	9 April 1992	
087	Clive Betts	Lab	Sheffield South East	9 April 1992	
088	Elfyn Llwyd	PC	Dwyfor Meirionnydd	9 April 1992	Parliamentary group leader: PC
089	Ann Coffey	Lab	Stockport	9 April 1992	
090	Bob Ainsworth	Lab	Coventry North East	9 April 1992	
091	Alan Duncan	C	Rutland and Melton	9 April 1992	
092	Jim Dowd	Lab	Lewisham West and Penge	9 April 1992	
093	Sir Paul Beresford	C	Mole Valley	9 April 1992	
094	(Sir) Nick Harvey	LD	North Devon	9 April 1992	
095	Iain Duncan Smith	C	Chingford and Woodford Green	9 April 1992	
096	Glenda Jackson	Lab	Hampstead and Kilburn	9 April 1992	
097	Malcolm Wicks	Lab	Croydon North	9 April 1992	Died: 29 September 2012
098	Mike Gapes	Lab	Ilford South	9 April 1992	
099	Nigel Evans	C	Ribble Valley	9 April 1992	Deputy Speaker:1st Dep. Ch., Ways and Means (8 June 2010 – 10 September 2013)
100	David Willetts	C	Havant	9 April 1992	
101	Cheryl Gillan	C	Chesham and Amersham	9 April 1992	
102	Brian Donohoe	Lab	Central Ayrshire	9 April 1992	
103	John Denham	Lab	Southampton Itchen	9 April 1992	
104	James Clappison	C	Hertsmere	9 April 1992	
105	Bernard Jenkin	C	Harwich and North Essex	9 April 1992	
106	(Sir) Richard Ottaway	C	Croydon South	9 April 1992	Previously served 1983–87
107	Eric Pickles	C	Brentwood and Ongar	9 April 1992	
108	(Dame) Tessa Jowell	Lab	Dulwich and West Norwood	9 April 1992	
109	Angela Eagle	Lab	Wallasey	9 April 1992	Shadow Leader of the House (7 October 2011-)
110	John Whittingdale	C	Maldon	9 April 1992	
111	Alan Keen	Lab	Feltham and Heston	9 April 1992	Died: 10 November 2011
112	John Spellar	Lab	Warley	9 April 1992	Previously served 1982–83
113	Roger Godsiff	Lab	Birmingham Hall Green	9 April 1992	
114	George Mudie	Lab	Leeds East	9 April 1992	
115	Nick Raynsford	Lab	Greenwich and Woolwich	9 April 1992	Previously served 1986–87
116	Andrew Robathan	C	South Leicestershire	9 April 1992	
117	Denis MacShane	Lab	Rotherham	5 May 1994	Suspended from party and whip withdrawn: 14 October 2010. Sat as an independent until suspension lifted and whip restored: 4 July 2012. Resigned: 5 November 2012.
118	Margaret, Lady Hodge	Lab	Barking	9 June 1994	
119	Gerry Sutcliffe	Lab	Bradford South	9 June 1994	
120	Stephen Timms	Lab	East Ham	9 June 1994	
121	Jon Trickett	Lab	Hemsworth	1 February 1996	
52nd Parliament (elected: 1 May 1997, first met: 7 May 1997, dissolved: 14 May 2001)
122	Francis Maude	C	Horsham	1 May 1997	Previously served 1983–92
123	Frank Doran	Lab	Aberdeen North	1 May 1997	Previously served 1987–92
124	Anne McIntosh	C	Thirsk and Malton	1 May 1997	Postponed poll for this Parliament: 27 May 2010
125	Keith Simpson	C	Broadland	1 May 1997	
126	Julian Lewis	C	New Forest East	1 May 1997	
127	Owen Paterson	C	North Shropshire	1 May 1997	
128	Laurence Robertson	C	Tewkesbury	1 May 1997	
129	Robert Syms	C	Poole	1 May 1997	
130	Ben Bradshaw	Lab	Exeter	1 May 1997	
131	Andrew Lansley	C	South Cambridgeshire	1 May 1997	Leader of the House of Commons (4 September 2012 – 14 July 2014)
132	Mike Hancock	LD	Portsmouth South	1 May 1997	Previously served 1984–87. Resigned whip and sat as Independent: 3 June 2013.
133	Ed Davey	LD	Kingston and Surbiton	1 May 1997	
134	Paul Burstow	LD	Sutton and Cheam	1 May 1997	
135	Helen Jones	Lab	Warrington North	1 May 1997	
136	Jim Fitzpatrick	Lab	Poplar and Limehouse	1 May 1997	
137	Jeffrey Donaldson	DUP	Lagan Valley	1 May 1997	
138	John McDonnell	Lab	Hayes and Harlington	1 May 1997	
139	Gareth Thomas	Lab	Harrow West	1 May 1997	
140	Eleanor Laing	C	Epping Forest	1 May 1997	Deputy Speaker:1st Dep. Ch., Ways and Means (16 October 2013-)
141	(Sir) Andrew Stunell	LD	Hazel Grove	1 May 1997	
142	Paul Goggins	Lab	Wythenshawe and Sale East	1 May 1997	Died: 7 January 2014
143	Hazel Blears	Lab	Salford and Eccles	1 May 1997	
144	Stephen Pound	Lab	Ealing North	1 May 1997	
145	Lindsay Hoyle	Lab	Chorley	1 May 1997	Deputy Speaker: Chairman, Ways and Means
146	John Healey	Lab	Wentworth and Dearne	1 May 1997	
147	Louise Ellman	Lab	Liverpool, Riverside	1 May 1997	
148	Philip Hammond	C	Runnymede and Weybridge	1 May 1997	
149	Tim Loughton	C	East Worthing and Shoreham	1 May 1997	
150	Shaun Woodward	Lab	St Helens South and Whiston	1 May 1997	
151	Vince Cable	LD	Twickenham	1 May 1997	Deputy Leader, LD (2 March 2006 – 26 May 2010)
152	Adrian Sanders	LD	Torbay	1 May 1997	
153	David Heath	LD	Somerton and Frome	1 May 1997	
154	Tom Brake	LD	Carshalton and Wallington	1 May 1997	
155	Fiona Mactaggart	Lab	Slough	1 May 1997	
156	Kelvin Hopkins	Lab	Luton North	1 May 1997	
157	Theresa May	C	Maidenhead	1 May 1997	
158	Graham Brady	C	Altrincham and Sale West	1 May 1997	
159	Martin Caton	Lab	Gower	1 May 1997	
160	John Bercow	Spe	Buckingham	1 May 1997	Speaker
161	Nick Gibb	C	Bognor Regis and Littlehampton	1 May 1997	
162	Stephen Hepburn	Lab	Jarrow	1 May 1997	
163	Alan Whitehead	Lab	Southampton Test	1 May 1997	
164	Gisela Stuart	Lab	Birmingham Edgbaston	1 May 1997	
165	Alan Johnson	Lab	Kingston upon Hull West and Hessle	1 May 1997	
166	Barry Gardiner	Lab	Brent North	1 May 1997	
167	Caroline Flint	Lab	Don Valley	1 May 1997	
168	Andrew Tyrie	C	Chichester	1 May 1997	
169	Phil Woolas	Lab	Oldham East and Saddleworth	1 May 1997	Seat declared vacant on petition: 5 November 2010
170	Dominic Grieve	C	Beaconsfield	1 May 1997	
171	David Crausby	Lab	Bolton North East	1 May 1997	
172	Andy Love	Lab	Edmonton	1 May 1997	
173	David Ruffley	C	Bury St Edmunds	1 May 1997	
174	Norman Baker	LD	Lewes	1 May 1997	
175	Desmond Swayne	C	New Forest West	1 May 1997	
176	(Dame) Anne Begg	Lab	Aberdeen South	1 May 1997	
177	Fabian Hamilton	Lab	Leeds North East	1 May 1997	
178	Marsha Singh	Lab	Bradford West	1 May 1997	Resigned: 2 March 2012
179	Caroline Spelman	C	Meriden	1 May 1997	
180	(Sir) Gerald Howarth	C	Aldershot	1 May 1997	Previously served 1983–92
181	Michael Fallon	C	Sevenoaks	1 May 1997	Previously served 1983–92
182	Mike Wood	Lab	Batley and Spen	1 May 1997	
183	Damian Green	C	Ashford	1 May 1997	
184	James Gray	C	North Wiltshire	1 May 1997	
185	Chris Ruane	Lab	Vale of Clwyd	1 May 1997	
186	Alan Campbell	Lab	Tynemouth	1 May 1997	
187	Steve Webb	LD	Thornbury and Yate	1 May 1997	
188	Maria Eagle	Lab	Garston and Halewood	1 May 1997	
189	Rosie Winterton	Lab	Doncaster Central	1 May 1997	Shadow Leader of the House (12 May-8 October 2010). Chief Whip, Lab (7 October 2010-)
190	Ivan Lewis	Lab	Bury South	1 May 1997	
191	Gordon Marsden	Lab	Blackpool South	1 May 1997	
192	Michael Moore	LD	Berwickshire, Roxburgh and Selkirk	1 May 1997	
193	Sir Robert Smith, Bt	LD	West Aberdeenshire and Kincardine	1 May 1997	
194	Clive Efford	Lab	Eltham	1 May 1997	
195	Karen Buck	Lab	Westminster North	1 May 1997	
196	Steve McCabe	Lab	Birmingham Selly Oak	1 May 1997	
197	Jim Dobbin	Lab	Heywood and Middleton	1 May 1997	Died: 6 September 2014
198	Graham Stringer	Lab	Blackley and Broughton	1 May 1997	
199	Andrew George	LD	St Ives	1 May 1997	
200	John Hayes	C	South Holland and The Deepings	1 May 1997	
201	Dave Watts	Lab	St Helens North	1 May 1997	
202	Oliver Letwin	C	West Dorset	1 May 1997	
203	Yvette Cooper	Lab	Normanton, Pontefract and Castleford	1 May 1997	
204	Vernon Coaker	Lab	Gedling	1 May 1997	
205	Jim Murphy	Lab	East Renfrewshire	1 May 1997	
206	Sandra Osborne	Lab	Ayr, Carrick and Cumnock	1 May 1997	
207	Russell Brown	Lab	Dumfries and Galloway	1 May 1997	
208	(Sir) Bob Russell	LD	Colchester	1 May 1997	
209	Crispin Blunt	C	Reigate	1 May 1997	
210	Bob Walter	C	North Dorset	1 May 1997	
211	Derek Twigg	Lab	Halton	1 May 1997	
212	Siobhain McDonagh	Lab	Mitcham and Morden	1 May 1997	
213	Christopher Chope	C	Christchurch	1 May 1997	Previously served 1983–92
214	Frank Roy	Lab	Motherwell and Wishaw	1 May 1997	
215	(Dame) Anne McGuire	Lab	Stirling	1 May 1997	
216	John Randall	C	Uxbridge and South Ruislip	31 July 1997	
217	Douglas Alexander	Lab	Paisley and Renfrewshire South	6 November 1997	
218	Hilary Benn	Lab	Leeds Central	10 June 1999	Shadow Leader of the House (8 October 2010 – 7 October 2011)
219	Stephen O'Brien	C	Eddisbury	22 July 1999	
220	David Lammy	Lab	Tottenham	22 June 2000	
221	John Robertson	Lab	Glasgow North West	23 November 2000	
222	Mark Hendrick	Lab	Preston	23 November 2000	
223	Adrian Bailey	Lab	West Bromwich West	23 November 2000	
224	Eric Joyce	Lab	Falkirk	22 December 2000	Suspended from party and whip withdrawn: 23 February 2011. Sat as an independent thereafter.
53rd Parliament (elected: 7 June 2001, first met: 13 June 2001, dissolved: 11 April 2005)
225	Greg Knight	C	East Yorkshire	7 June 2001	Previously served 1983–97
226	Richard Bacon	C	South Norfolk	7 June 2001	
227	Meg Munn	Lab	Sheffield Heeley	7 June 2001	
228	Nigel Dodds	DUP	Belfast North	7 June 2001	Parliamentary group leader: DUP
229	Gregory Campbell	DUP	East Londonderry	7 June 2001	
230	Bill Wiggin	C	North Herefordshire	7 June 2001	
231	Andrew Rosindell	C	Romford	7 June 2001	
232	David Cameron	C	Witney	7 June 2001	Leader, C. Prime Minister (11 May 2010-)
233	Kevin Brennan	Lab	Cardiff West	7 June 2001	
234	Mark Lazarowicz	Lab	Edinburgh North and Leith	7 June 2001	
235	Wayne David	Lab	Caerphilly	7 June 2001	
236	Chris Grayling	C	Epsom and Ewell	7 June 2001	
237	Jon Cruddas	Lab	Dagenham and Rainham	7 June 2001	
238	Ann McKechin	Lab	Glasgow North	7 June 2001	
239	Tom Watson	Lab	West Bromwich East	7 June 2001	
240	Andy Burnham	Lab	Leigh	7 June 2001	
241	David Wright	Lab	Telford	7 June 2001	
242	David Miliband	Lab	South Shields	7 June 2001	Resigned: 15 April 2013
243	John Mann	Lab	Bassetlaw	7 June 2001	
244	Kevan Jones	Lab	North Durham	7 June 2001	
245	Alistair Carmichael	LD	Orkney and Shetland	7 June 2001	Chief Whip, LD (11 May 2011 – 7 October 2013)
246	Alan Reid	LD	Argyll and Bute	7 June 2001	
247	John Thurso	LD	Caithness, Sutherland and Easter Ross	7 June 2001	Previously in House of Lords as the 3rd Viscount Thurso 1995–99
248	David Hamilton	Lab	Midlothian	7 June 2001	
249	Hywel Francis	Lab	Aberavon	7 June 2001	
250	Mike Weir	SNP	Angus	7 June 2001	
251	Dai Havard	Lab	Merthyr Tydfil and Rhymney	7 June 2001	
252	Greg Barker	C	Bexhill and Battle	7 June 2001	
253	John Baron	C	Basildon and Billericay	7 June 2001	
254	Mark Prisk	C	Hertford and Stortford	7 June 2001	
255	Mark Francois	C	Rayleigh and Wickford	7 June 2001	
256	Andrew Selous	C	South West Bedfordshire	7 June 2001	
257	Hugo Swire	C	East Devon	7 June 2001	
258	Khalid Mahmood	Lab	Birmingham Perry Barr	7 June 2001	
259	Mark Simmonds	C	Boston and Skegness	7 June 2001	
260	Mark Field	C	Cities of London and Westminster	7 June 2001	
261	Henry Bellingham	C	North West Norfolk	7 June 2001	Previously served 1983–97
262	Jim Sheridan	Lab	Paisley and Renfrewshire North	7 June 2001	
263	Paul Farrelly	Lab	Newcastle-under-Lyme	7 June 2001	
264	(Dame) Angela Watkinson	C	Hornchurch and Upminster	7 June 2001	
265	Jonathan Djanogly	C	Huntingdon	7 June 2001	
266	Patrick Mercer	C	Newark	7 June 2001	Resigned whip and sat as Independent: 31 May 2013. Resigned: 29 April 2014.
267	Andrew Murrison	C	South West Wiltshire	7 June 2001	
268	Ian Liddell-Grainger	C	Bridgwater and West Somerset	7 June 2001	
269	Charles Hendry	C	Wealden	7 June 2001	Previously served 1992–97
270	George Osborne	C	Tatton	7 June 2001	
271	Tom Harris	Lab	Glasgow South	7 June 2001	
272	Ian Lucas	Lab	Wrexham	7 June 2001	
273	David Heyes	Lab	Ashton-under-Lyne	7 June 2001	
274	David Laws	LD	Yeovil	7 June 2001	
275	John Pugh	LD	Southport	7 June 2001	
276	Annette Brooke	LD	Mid Dorset and North Poole	7 June 2001	
277	Sylvia, Lady Hermon	Ind	North Down	7 June 2001	
278	Mark Hoban	C	Fareham	7 June 2001	
279	Mark Tami	Lab	Alyn and Deeside	7 June 2001	
280	Norman Lamb	LD	North Norfolk	7 June 2001	
281	Hywel Williams	PC	Arfon	7 June 2001	
282	Alistair Burt	C	North East Bedfordshire	7 June 2001	Previously served 1983–97
283	Albert Owen	Lab	Ynys Môn	7 June 2001	
284	Angus Robertson	SNP	Moray	7 June 2001	Parliamentary group leader, SNP
285	David Cairns	Lab	Inverclyde	7 June 2001	Died: 9 May 2011
286	(Sir) Tony Cunningham	Lab	Workington	7 June 2001	
287	Andrew Turner	C	Isle of Wight	7 June 2001	
288	Hugh Robertson	C	Faversham and Mid Kent	7 June 2001	
289	Roger Williams	LD	Brecon and Radnorshire	7 June 2001	
290	Chris Bryant	Lab	Rhondda	7 June 2001	
291	Pete Wishart	SNP	Perth and North Perthshire	7 June 2001	
292	Andrew Mitchell	C	Sutton Coldfield	7 June 2001	Previously served 1987–97. Chief Whip, C (4 September-19 October 2012)
293	Huw Irranca-Davies	Lab	Ogmore	14 February 2002	
294	Sarah Teather	LD	Brent Central	18 September 2003	
295	Liam Byrne	Lab	Birmingham Hodge Hill	15 July 2004	
296	Iain Wright	Lab	Hartlepool	30 September 2004	
54th Parliament (elected: 5 May 2005, first met: 11 May 2005, dissolved: 12 April 2010)
297	Sir Malcolm Rifkind	C	Kensington	5 May 2005	Previously served 1974–97
298	William McCrea	DUP	South Antrim	5 May 2005	Previously served 1983-97 and 2000–01
299	Mark Williams	LD	Ceredigion	5 May 2005	
300	David Simpson	DUP	Upper Bann	5 May 2005	
301	Martin Horwood	LD	Cheltenham	5 May 2005	
302	Charles Walker	C	Broxbourne	5 May 2005	
303	Dave Anderson	Lab	Blaydon	5 May 2005	
304	Siân James	Lab	Swansea East	5 May 2005	
305	Tobias Ellwood	C	Bournemouth East	5 May 2005	
306	Adam Afriyie	C	Windsor	5 May 2005	
307	Jeremy Browne	LD	Taunton Deane	5 May 2005	
308	Dan Rogerson	LD	North Cornwall	5 May 2005	
309	Nick Clegg	LD	Sheffield Hallam	5 May 2005	Leader, LD. Deputy Prime Minister (12 May 2010-).
310	Tim Farron	LD	Westmorland and Lonsdale	5 May 2005	
311	Anne Milton	C	Guildford	5 May 2005	
312	Anne Main	C	St Albans	5 May 2005	
313	Katy Clark	Lab	North Ayrshire and Arran	5 May 2005	
314	David Evennett	C	Bexleyheath and Crayford	5 May 2005	
315	Danny Alexander	LD	Inverness, Nairn, Badenoch and Strathspey	5 May 2005	
316	Lee Scott	C	Ilford North	5 May 2005	
317	Stephen Williams	LD	Bristol West	5 May 2005	
318	Alison Seabeck	Lab	Plymouth Moor View	5 May 2005	
319	Stewart Hosie	SNP	Dundee East	5 May 2005	
320	Grant Shapps	C	Welwyn Hatfield	5 May 2005	
321	Mike Penning	C	Hemel Hempstead	5 May 2005	
322	Nick Hurd	C	Ruislip, Northwood and Pinner	5 May 2005	
323	Daniel Kawczynski	C	Shrewsbury and Atcham	5 May 2005	
324	Justine Greening	C	Putney	5 May 2005	
325	Jeremy Wright	C	Kenilworth and Southam	5 May 2005	
326	Brian Binley	C	Northampton South	5 May 2005	
327	James Duddridge	C	Rochford and Southend East	5 May 2005	
328	James Brokenshire	C	Old Bexley and Sidcup	5 May 2005	
329	Philip Hollobone	C	Kettering	5 May 2005	
330	Theresa Villiers	C	Chipping Barnet	5 May 2005	
331	Rob Wilson	C	Reading East	5 May 2005	
332	Peter Bone	C	Wellingborough	5 May 2005	
333	David Gauke	C	South West Hertfordshire	5 May 2005	
334	Nick Herbert	C	Arundel and South Downs	5 May 2005	
335	Mark Harper	C	Forest of Dean	5 May 2005	
336	David Mundell	C	Dumfriesshire, Clydesdale and Tweeddale	5 May 2005	
337	Chris Huhne	LD	Eastleigh	5 May 2005	Resigned: 5 February 2013
338	Madeleine Moon	Lab	Bridgend	5 May 2005	
339	John Penrose	C	Weston-Super-Mare	5 May 2005	
340	Mark Pritchard	C	The Wrekin	5 May 2005	
341	Maria Miller	C	Basingstoke	5 May 2005	
342	Shailesh Vara	C	North West Cambridgeshire	5 May 2005	
343	Richard Benyon	C	Newbury	5 May 2005	
344	Douglas Carswell	C	Clacton	5 May 2005	Resigned 29 August 2014 and re-elected for UKIP 9 October 2014
345	Mark Lancaster	C	Milton Keynes North	5 May 2005	
346	Greg Hands	C	Chelsea and Fulham	5 May 2005	
347	Sadiq Khan	Lab	Tooting	5 May 2005	
348	Jenny Willott	LD	Cardiff Central	5 May 2005	
349	Ed Balls	Lab	Morley and Outwood	5 May 2005	
350	Ben Wallace	C	Wyre and Preston North	5 May 2005	
351	Jeremy Hunt	C	South West Surrey	5 May 2005	
352	Lorely Burt	LD	Solihull	5 May 2005	
353	David Davies	C	Monmouth	5 May 2005	
354	David Jones	C	Clwyd West	5 May 2005	
355	Lyn Brown	Lab	West Ham	5 May 2005	
356	Philip Davies	C	Shipley	5 May 2005	
357	Stephen Hammond	C	Wimbledon	5 May 2005	
358	Jo Swinson	LD	East Dunbartonshire	5 May 2005	
359	Sir Peter Soulsby	Lab	Leicester South	5 May 2005	Resigned: 1 April 2011
360	Ed Vaizey	C	Wantage	5 May 2005	
361	Andrew Gwynne	Lab	Denton and Reddish	5 May 2005	
362	Stewart Jackson	C	Peterborough	5 May 2005	
363	Stephen Crabb	C	Preseli Pembrokeshire	5 May 2005	
364	Brooks Newmark	C	Braintree	5 May 2005	
365	Greg Mulholland	LD	Leeds North West	5 May 2005	
366	Mary Creagh	Lab	Wakefield	5 May 2005	
367	Mark Durkan	SDLP	Foyle	5 May 2005	
368	Alasdair McDonnell	SDLP	Belfast South	5 May 2005	Leader, SDLP (5 November 2011-)
369	Helen Goodman	Lab	Bishop Auckland	5 May 2005	
370	Pat McFadden	Lab	Wolverhampton South East	5 May 2005	
371	Meg Hillier	Lab	Hackney South and Shoreditch	5 May 2005	
372	Linda Riordan	Lab	Halifax	5 May 2005	
373	Lynne Featherstone	LD	Hornsey and Wood Green	5 May 2005	
374	Sammy Wilson	DUP	East Antrim	5 May 2005	
375	Robert Goodwill	C	Scarborough and Whitby	5 May 2005	
376	Adam Holloway	C	Gravesham	5 May 2005	
377	Natascha Engel	Lab	North East Derbyshire	5 May 2005	
378	Roberta Blackman-Woods	Lab	City of Durham	5 May 2005	
379	Gordon Banks	Lab	Ochil and South Perthshire	5 May 2005	
380	Rob Flello	Lab	Stoke-on-Trent South	5 May 2005	
381	Greg Clark	C	Tunbridge Wells	5 May 2005	
382	Michael Gove	C	Surrey Heath	5 May 2005	Chief Whip, C (15 July 2014-)
383	Angela Smith	Lab	Penistone and Stocksbridge	5 May 2005	
384	Kerry McCarthy	Lab	Bristol East	5 May 2005	
385	Jessica Morden	Lab	Newport East	5 May 2005	
386	Diana Johnson	Lab	Kingston upon Hull North	5 May 2005	
387	Graham Stuart	C	Beverley and Holderness	5 May 2005	
388	Nadine Dorries	C	Mid Bedfordshire	5 May 2005	C whip suspended 6 November 2012 – 8 May 2013
389	John Leech	LD	Manchester Withington	5 May 2005	
390	David Burrowes	C	Enfield Southgate	5 May 2005	
391	Emily Thornberry	Lab	Islington South and Finsbury	5 May 2005	
392	Barbara Keeley	Lab	Worsley and Eccles South	5 May 2005	
393	Sharon Hodgson	Lab	Washington and Sunderland West	5 May 2005	
394	Geoffrey Cox	C	Torridge and West Devon	5 May 2005	
395	Andy Slaughter	Lab	Hammersmith	5 May 2005	
396	John Hemming	LD	Birmingham Yardley	5 May 2005	
397	Jim McGovern	Lab	Dundee West	5 May 2005	
398	Ed Miliband	Lab	Doncaster North	5 May 2005	Leader, Lab and Leader of the Opposition (25 September 2010-)
399	Jamie Reed	Lab	Copeland	5 May 2005	
400	Ian Austin	Lab	Dudley North	5 May 2005	
401	Philip Dunne	C	Ludlow	5 May 2005	
402	Angus MacNeil	SNP	Na h-Eileanan an Iar	5 May 2005	
403	Rosie Cooper	Lab	West Lancashire	5 May 2005	
404	Nia Griffith	Lab	Llanelli	5 May 2005	
405	Mark Hunter	LD	Cheadle	14 July 2005	
406	Bob Neill	C	Bromley and Chislehurst	29 June 2006	
407	Virendra Sharma	Lab	Ealing Southall	19 July 2007	
408	Phil Wilson	Lab	Sedgefield	19 July 2007	
409	Edward Timpson	C	Crewe and Nantwich	22 May 2008	
410	John Howell	C	Henley	26 June 2008	
411	Lindsay Roy	Lab	Glenrothes	6 November 2008	
412	Chloe Smith	C	Norwich North	23 July 2009	
413	Willie Bain	Lab	Glasgow North East	12 November 2009	
55th Parliament (elected: 6 May 2010, first met: 18 May 2010, dissolved: 30 March 2015)
414	Valerie Vaz	Lab	Walsall South	6 May 2010	
415	Chris Leslie	Lab	Nottingham East	6 May 2010	Previously served 1997–2005
416	Catherine McKinnell	Lab	Newcastle upon Tyne North	6 May 2010	
417	Julian Huppert	LD	Cambridge	6 May 2010	
418	Rory Stewart	C	Penrith and The Border	6 May 2010	
419	Bob Stewart	C	Beckenham	6 May 2010	
420	Chris Heaton-Harris	C	Daventry	6 May 2010	
421	Iain Stewart	C	Milton Keynes South	6 May 2010	
422	Andrew Bridgen	C	North West Leicestershire	6 May 2010	
423	Nigel Mills	C	Amber Valley	6 May 2010	
424	Neil Parish	C	Tiverton and Honiton	6 May 2010	
425	Jack Lopresti	C	Filton and Bradley Stoke	6 May 2010	
426	Jonathan Reynolds	Lab	Stalybridge and Hyde	6 May 2010	
427	Pat Glass	Lab	North West Durham	6 May 2010	
428	Simon Hart	C	Carmarthen West and South Pembrokeshire	6 May 2010	
429	Martin Vickers	C	Cleethorpes	6 May 2010	
430	Geraint Davies	Lab	Swansea West	6 May 2010	Previously served 1997–2005
431	John Cryer	Lab	Leyton and Wanstead	6 May 2010	Previously served 1997–2005
432	Priti Patel	C	Witham	6 May 2010	
433	Charlie Elphicke	C	Dover	6 May 2010	
434	Alec Shelbrooke	C	Elmet and Rothwell	6 May 2010	
435	Nigel Adams	C	Selby and Ainsty	6 May 2010	
436	Charlotte Leslie	C	Bristol North West	6 May 2010	
437	Sam Gyimah	C	East Surrey	6 May 2010	
438	Mel Stride	C	Central Devon	6 May 2010	
439	Mary Macleod	C	Brentford and Isleworth	6 May 2010	
440	Stephen Mosley	C	City of Chester	6 May 2010	
441	Claire Perry	C	Devizes	6 May 2010	
442	Damian Hinds	C	East Hampshire	6 May 2010	
443	Guto Bebb	C	Aberconwy	6 May 2010	
444	Gregg McClymont	Lab	Cumbernauld, Kilsyth and Kirkintilloch East	6 May 2010	
445	Duncan Hames	LD	Chippenham	6 May 2010	
446	Anna Soubry	C	Broxtowe	6 May 2010	
447	Mark Spencer	C	Sherwood	6 May 2010	
448	Ian Lavery	Lab	Wansbeck	6 May 2010	
449	Grahame Morris	Lab	Easington	6 May 2010	
450	Ian Mearns	Lab	Gateshead	6 May 2010	
451	Richard Harrington	C	Watford	6 May 2010	
452	Sajid Javid	C	Bromsgrove	6 May 2010	
453	Robert Halfon	C	Harlow	6 May 2010	
454	John Glen	C	Salisbury	6 May 2010	
455	Andrew Griffiths	C	Burton	6 May 2010	
456	Jesse Norman	C	Hereford and South Herefordshire	6 May 2010	
457	David Morris	C	Morecambe and Lunesdale	6 May 2010	
458	Richard Drax	C	South Dorset	6 May 2010	
459	Bob Blackman	C	Harrow East	6 May 2010	
460	Fiona Bruce	C	Congleton	6 May 2010	
461	Angie Bray	C	Ealing Central and Acton	6 May 2010	
462	Esther McVey	C	Wirral West	6 May 2010	
463	Karl McCartney	C	Lincoln	6 May 2010	
464	Kris Hopkins	C	Keighley	6 May 2010	
465	Sarah Wollaston	C	Totnes	6 May 2010	
466	Dan Poulter	C	Central Suffolk and North Ipswich	6 May 2010	
467	Tracey Crouch	C	Chatham and Aylesford	6 May 2010	
468	Mary Glindon	Lab	North Tyneside	6 May 2010	
469	Julie Elliott	Lab	Sunderland Central	6 May 2010	
470	Heather Wheeler	C	South Derbyshire	6 May 2010	
471	Peter Aldous	C	Waveney	6 May 2010	
472	James Morris	C	Halesowen and Rowley Regis	6 May 2010	
473	Mark Garnier	C	Wyre Forest	6 May 2010	
474	Nick de Bois	C	Enfield North	6 May 2010	
475	Pauline Latham	C	Mid Derbyshire	6 May 2010	
476	Chuka Umunna	Lab	Streatham	6 May 2010	
477	Andrew Percy	C	Brigg and Goole	6 May 2010	
478	Simon Reevell	C	Dewsbury	6 May 2010	
479	Dominic Raab	C	Esher and Walton	6 May 2010	
480	Damian Collins	C	Folkestone and Hythe	6 May 2010	
481	Caroline Nokes	C	Romsey and Southampton North	6 May 2010	
482	Caroline Dinenage	C	Gosport	6 May 2010	
483	Lorraine Fullbrook	C	South Ribble	6 May 2010	
484	Conor Burns	C	Bournemouth West	6 May 2010	
485	Mark Menzies	C	Fylde	6 May 2010	
486	Toby Perkins	Lab	Chesterfield	6 May 2010	
487	Bill Esterson	Lab	Sefton Central	6 May 2010	
488	Julie Hilling	Lab	Bolton West	6 May 2010	
489	Yasmin Qureshi	Lab	Bolton South East	6 May 2010	
490	Ian Paisley Jr	DUP	North Antrim	6 May 2010	
491	Graham Evans	C	Weaver Vale	6 May 2010	
492	Kate Green	Lab	Stretford and Urmston	6 May 2010	
493	Rachel Reeves	Lab	Leeds West	6 May 2010	
494	Jonathan Lord	C	Woking	6 May 2010	
495	Richard Fuller	C	Bedford	6 May 2010	
496	Julian Smith	C	Skipton and Ripon	6 May 2010	
497	Lilian Greenwood	Lab	Nottingham South	6 May 2010	
498	Owen Smith	Lab	Pontypridd	6 May 2010	
499	Chris Evans	Lab	Islwyn	6 May 2010	
500	Cathy Jamieson	Lab	Kilmarnock and Loudoun	6 May 2010	
501	James Wharton	C	Stockton South	6 May 2010	
502	Julian Sturdy	C	York Outer	6 May 2010	
503	Craig Whittaker	C	Calder Valley	6 May 2010	
504	Therese Coffey	C	Suffolk Coastal	6 May 2010	
505	Chris Skidmore	C	Kingswood	6 May 2010	
506	Jonathan Edwards	PC	Carmarthen East and Dinefwr	6 May 2010	
507	Jeremy Lefroy	C	Stafford	6 May 2010	
508	Jessica Lee	C	Erewash	6 May 2010	
509	Christopher Pincher	C	Tamworth	6 May 2010	
510	Nicky Morgan	C	Loughborough	6 May 2010	
511	John Woodcock	Lab	Barrow and Furness	6 May 2010	
512	George Freeman	C	Mid Norfolk	6 May 2010	
513	Gavin Shuker	Lab	Luton South	6 May 2010	
514	Bridget Phillipson	Lab	Houghton and Sunderland South	6 May 2010	
515	Nick Smith	Lab	Blaenau Gwent	6 May 2010	
516	David Rutley	C	Macclesfield	6 May 2010	
517	Mike Weatherley	C	Hove	6 May 2010	
518	Simon Kirby	C	Brighton Kemptown	6 May 2010	
519	Karl Turner	Lab	Kingston upon Hull East	6 May 2010	
520	Eilidh Whiteford	SNP	Banff and Buchan	6 May 2010	
521	Penny Mordaunt	C	Portsmouth North	6 May 2010	
522	Andrew Bingham	C	High Peak	6 May 2010	
523	Alex Cunningham	Lab	Stockton North	6 May 2010	
524	Chinyelu Onwurah	Lab	Newcastle upon Tyne Central	6 May 2010	
525	Heidi Alexander	Lab	Lewisham East	6 May 2010	
526	Yvonne Fovargue	Lab	Makerfield	6 May 2010	
527	Gloria De Piero	Lab	Ashfield	6 May 2010	
528	Michael Dugher	Lab	Barnsley East	6 May 2010	
529	Jenny Chapman	Lab	Darlington	6 May 2010	
530	Liz Kendall	Lab	Leicester West	6 May 2010	
531	Luciana Berger	Lab	Liverpool Wavertree	6 May 2010	
532	Tristram Hunt	Lab	Stoke-on-Trent Central	6 May 2010	
533	Neil Carmichael	C	Stroud	6 May 2010	
534	Anne Marie Morris	C	Newton Abbot	6 May 2010	
535	Henry Smith	C	Crawley	6 May 2010	
536	Tom Blenkinsop	Lab	Middlesbrough South and East Cleveland	6 May 2010	
537	Phillip Lee	C	Bracknell	6 May 2010	
538	Liz Truss	C	South West Norfolk	6 May 2010	
539	Jonathan Evans	C	Cardiff North	6 May 2010	Previously served 1992–97
540	Guy Opperman	C	Hexham	6 May 2010	
541	David Nuttall	C	Bury North	6 May 2010	
542	Sheryll Murray	C	South East Cornwall	6 May 2010	
543	Gavin Barwell	C	Croydon Central	6 May 2010	
544	Helen Grant	C	Maidstone and The Weald	6 May 2010	
545	Andrea Leadsom	C	South Northamptonshire	6 May 2010	
546	Richard Graham	C	Gloucester	6 May 2010	
547	Alok Sharma	C	Reading West	6 May 2010	
548	Michael Crockart	LD	Edinburgh West	6 May 2010	
549	Dan Byles	C	North Warwickshire	6 May 2010	
550	Tom Greatrex	Lab	Rutherglen and Hamilton West	6 May 2010	
551	Gareth Johnson	C	Dartford	6 May 2010	
552	Marcus Jones	C	Nuneaton	6 May 2010	
553	Eric Ollerenshaw	C	Lancaster and Fleetwood	6 May 2010	
554	Andrew Stephenson	C	Pendle	6 May 2010	
555	Steve Brine	C	Winchester	6 May 2010	
556	Simon Wright	LD	Norwich South	6 May 2010	
557	Brandon Lewis	C	Great Yarmouth	6 May 2010	
558	Chris Kelly	C	Dudley South	6 May 2010	
559	Jackie Doyle-Price	C	Thurrock	6 May 2010	
560	Jo Johnson	C	Orpington	6 May 2010	
561	Margot James	C	Stourbridge	6 May 2010	
562	Mike Freer	C	Finchley and Golders Green	6 May 2010	
563	Jane Ellison	C	Battersea	6 May 2010	
564	Stephen Metcalfe	C	South Basildon and East Thurrock	6 May 2010	
565	Stephen McPartland	C	Stevenage	6 May 2010	
566	Gordon Henderson	C	Sittingbourne and Sheppey	6 May 2010	
567	Nicola Blackwood	C	Oxford West and Abingdon	6 May 2010	
568	Alun Cairns	C	Vale of Glamorgan	6 May 2010	
569	Glyn Davies	C	Montgomeryshire	6 May 2010	
570	Harriett Baldwin	C	West Worcestershire	6 May 2010	
571	Steve Barclay	C	North East Cambridgeshire	6 May 2010	
572	Gavin Williamson	C	South Staffordshire	6 May 2010	
573	Robin Walker	C	Worcester	6 May 2010	
574	Michael Ellis	C	Northampton North	6 May 2010	
575	Gordon Birtwistle	LD	Burnley	6 May 2010	
576	Nadhim Zahawi	C	Stratford-on-Avon	6 May 2010	
577	George Eustice	C	Camborne and Redruth	6 May 2010	
578	Karen Lumley	C	Redditch	6 May 2010	
579	George Hollingbery	C	Meon Valley	6 May 2010	
580	Robert Buckland	C	South Swindon	6 May 2010	
581	Justin Tomlinson	C	North Swindon	6 May 2010	
582	Rehman Chishti	C	Gillingham and Rainham	6 May 2010	
583	Ben Gummer	C	Ipswich	6 May 2010	
584	Jason McCartney	C	Colne Valley	6 May 2010	
585	Paul Maynard	C	Blackpool North and Cleveleys	6 May 2010	
586	Aidan Burley	C	Cannock Chase	6 May 2010	
587	Gemma Doyle	Lab	West Dunbartonshire	6 May 2010	
588	Andrew Jones	C	Harrogate and Knaresborough	6 May 2010	
589	Stephen Phillips	C	Sleaford and North Hykeham	6 May 2010	
590	Lisa Nandy	Lab	Wigan	6 May 2010	
591	Paul Blomfield	Lab	Sheffield Central	6 May 2010	
592	David Mowat	C	Warrington South	6 May 2010	
593	Matthew Hancock	C	West Suffolk	6 May 2010	
594	Chris White	C	Warwick and Leamington	6 May 2010	
595	Graeme Morrice	Lab	Livingston	6 May 2010	
596	Margaret Curran	Lab	Glasgow East	6 May 2010	
597	Stuart Andrew	C	Pudsey	6 May 2010	
598	Susan Elan Jones	Lab	Clwyd South	6 May 2010	
599	Ian Murray	Lab	Edinburgh South	6 May 2010	
600	Rebecca Harris	C	Castle Point	6 May 2010	
601	Caroline Lucas	GP	Brighton Pavilion	6 May 2010	
602	Matthew Offord	C	Hendon	6 May 2010	
603	Louise Bagshawe	C	Corby	6 May 2010	Resigned: 29 August 2012
604	Michael McCann	Lab	East Kilbride, Strathaven and Lesmahagow	6 May 2010	
605	Chris Williamson	Lab	Derby North	6 May 2010	
606	Steve Rotheram	Lab	Liverpool Walton	6 May 2010	
607	Teresa Pearce	Lab	Erith and Thamesmead	6 May 2010	
608	Pamela Nash	Lab	Airdrie and Shotts	6 May 2010	
609	Stephen Lloyd	LD	Eastbourne	6 May 2010	
610	Thomas Docherty	Lab	Dunfermline and West Fife	6 May 2010	
611	Jake Berry	C	Rossendale and Darwen	6 May 2010	
612	Jack Dromey	Lab	Birmingham Erdington	6 May 2010	
613	Laura Sandys	C	South Thanet	6 May 2010	
614	John Stevenson	C	Carlisle	6 May 2010	
615	Jacob Rees-Mogg	C	North East Somerset	6 May 2010	
616	Nicholas Boles	C	Grantham and Stamford	6 May 2010	
617	Amber Rudd	C	Hastings and Rye	6 May 2010	
618	Sarah Newton	C	Truro and Falmouth	6 May 2010	
619	Nic Dakin	Lab	Scunthorpe	6 May 2010	
620	Rushanara Ali	Lab	Bethnal Green and Bow	6 May 2010	
621	Shabana Mahmood	Lab	Birmingham Ladywood	6 May 2010	
622	Naomi Long	APNI	Belfast East	6 May 2010	
623	Simon Danczuk	Lab	Rochdale	6 May 2010	
624	Graham Jones	Lab	Hyndburn	6 May 2010	
625	Emma Reynolds	Lab	Wolverhampton North East	6 May 2010	
626	David Ward	LD	Bradford East	6 May 2010	Whip suspended and sat as Independent, 17 July 2013-September 2013
627	Anas Sarwar	Lab	Glasgow Central	6 May 2010	
628	Kwasi Kwarteng	C	Spelthorne	6 May 2010	
629	Zac Goldsmith	C	Richmond Park	6 May 2010	
630	Steve Gilbert	LD	St Austell and Newquay	6 May 2010	
631	Ian Swales	LD	Redcar	6 May 2010	
632	Mark Pawsey	C	Rugby	6 May 2010	
633	Oliver Colvile	C	Plymouth Sutton and Devonport	6 May 2010	
634	Mark Reckless	C	Rochester and Strood	6 May 2010	Resigned 30 September 2014 and re-elected for UKIP 20 November 2014
635	Steven Baker	C	Wycombe	6 May 2010	
636	Sheila Gilmore	Lab	Edinburgh East	6 May 2010	
637	Fiona O'Donnell	Lab	East Lothian	6 May 2010	
638	Paul Uppal	C	Wolverhampton South West	6 May 2010	
639	Stephen Twigg	Lab	Liverpool West Derby	6 May 2010	Previously served 1997–2005
640	Margaret Ritchie	SDLP	South Down	6 May 2010	Leader, SDLP (2010-5 November 2011)
641	Jim Shannon	DUP	Strangford	6 May 2010	
642	Tessa Munt	LD	Wells	6 May 2010	
643	Karen Bradley	C	Staffordshire Moorlands	6 May 2010	
644	Stella Creasy	Lab	Walthamstow	6 May 2010	
645	Alison McGovern	Lab	Wirral South	6 May 2010	
646	Debbie Abrahams	Lab	Oldham East and Saddleworth	13 January 2011	
647	Dan Jarvis	Lab	Barnsley Central	3 March 2011	
648	Jonathan Ashworth	Lab	Leicester South	5 May 2011	
649	Iain McKenzie	Lab	Inverclyde	30 June 2011	
650	Seema Malhotra	Lab	Feltham and Heston	15 December 2011	
651	George Galloway	Res	Bradford West	29 March 2012	Previously served 1987–2010
652	Andy Sawford	Lab	Corby	15 November 2012	
653	Stephen Doughty	Lab	Cardiff South and Penarth	15 November 2012	
654	Lucy Powell	Lab	Manchester Central	15 November 2012	
655	Sarah Champion	Lab	Rotherham	29 November 2012	
656	Andy McDonald	Lab	Middlesbrough	29 November 2012	
657	Steve Reed	Lab	Croydon North	29 November 2012	
658	Mike Thornton	LD	Eastleigh	28 February 2013	
659	Emma Lewell-Buck	Lab	South Shields	2 May 2013	
660	Mike Kane	Lab	Wythenshawe and Sale East	13 February 2014	
661	Robert Jenrick	C	Newark	5 June 2014	
662	Liz McInnes	Lab	Heywood and Middleton	9 October 2014	
Members who have never been sworn in
–	Gerry Adams	SF	Belfast West	1 May 1997	Previously served 1983–92. Resigned: 26 January 2011.
–	Martin McGuinness	SF	Mid Ulster	1 May 1997	Resigned: 2 January 2013
–	Pat Doherty	SF	West Tyrone	7 June 2001	
–	Michelle Gildernew	SF	Fermanagh and South Tyrone	7 June 2001	
–	Conor Murphy	SF	Newry and Armagh	5 May 2005	
–	Paul Maskey	SF	Belfast West	9 June 2011	
–	Francie Molloy	SF	Mid Ulster	7 March 2013	

== See also ==
- List of MPs elected in the 2010 United Kingdom general election
- List of United Kingdom MPs by seniority (2005–2010)
