= Kevin Dowd =

British economist (born 1958)

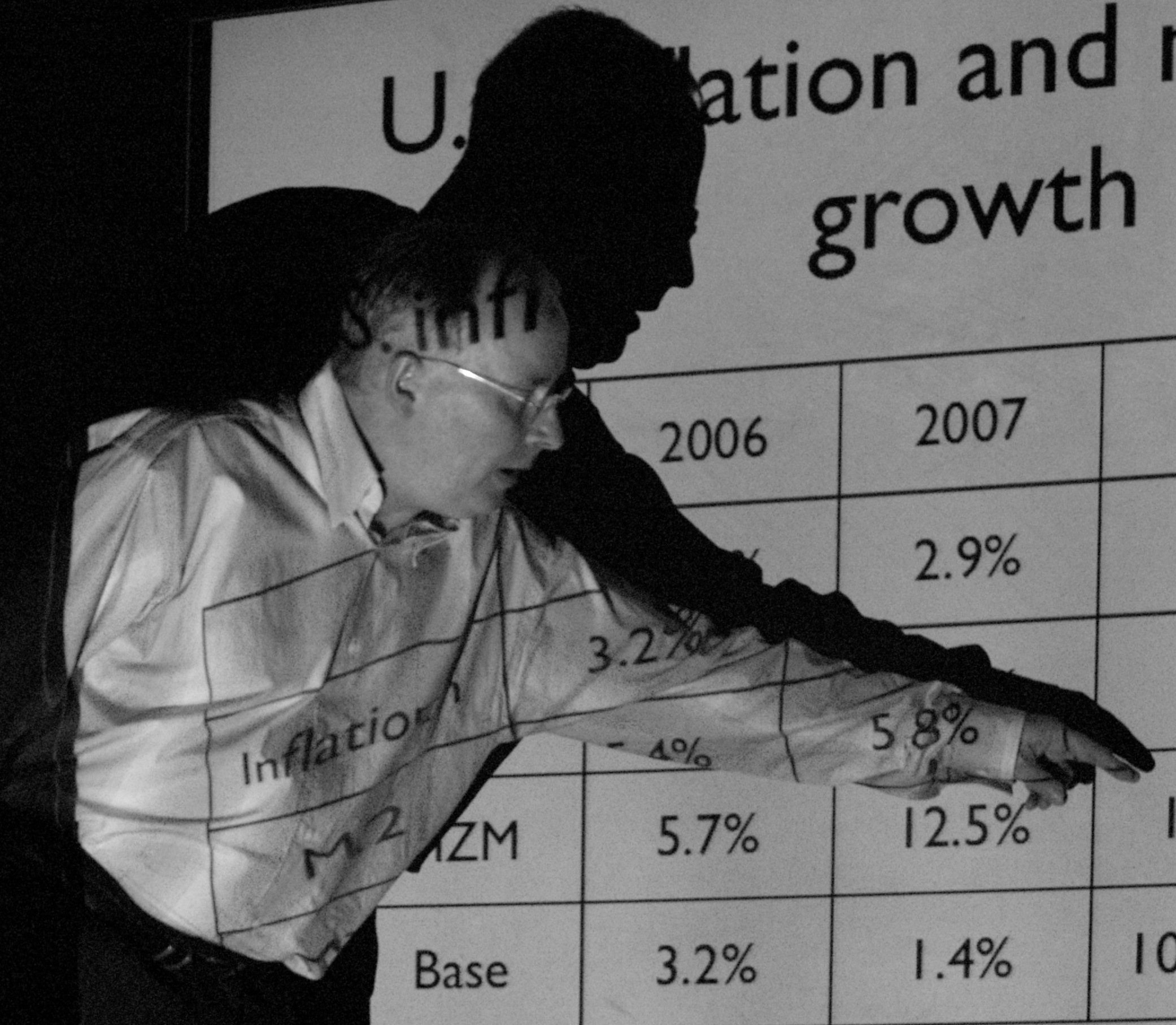
- Born: 1958 (age 67–68); Middlesbrough, England

Academic background
- Education: University of Sheffield (PhD) 1988; University of Western Ontario (MA) 1981; University of Sheffield (BA) 1980
- Influences: Milton Friedman, Friedrich Hayek, Chris R. Tame

Academic work
- School or tradition: Free Banking, Austrian economics
- Institutions: Durham University
- Website: Information at IDEAS / RePEc

Kevin Dowd is a British economist, having research interests in private money and free banking, monetary systems and macroeconomics, financial risk measurement and management, political economy and policy analysis, and pensions and mortality modelling. Since 2012, he has been a professor of finance and economics at Durham University Business School.

== Early life and education ==
Dowd was born in Middlesbrough in 1958, attended St Mary's College, Middlesbrough and went to the University of Sheffield in 1977 to study economics. He holds a BA in economics from the University of Sheffield, an MA in economics from the University of Western Ontario, and a PhD in macroeconomics from the University of Sheffield.

== Positions held ==
Dowd is affiliated with the Cato Institute; The Cobden Centre, the Adam Smith Institute, the Institute of Economic Affairs; the Independent Institute; and the Pensions Institute at Bayes Business School, City University.

He has held previous positions with the Ontario Economic Council in Toronto, Sheffield Hallam University, the University of Sheffield, and the University of Nottingham.

== Brexit ==
Kevin Dowd was a member of the think tank, Economists for Free Trade, and an avid supporter of Brexit. He was a significant contributor for the pro-Brexit lobby group Brexit Central and refused to vote in the Brexit referendum.

== Research ==
Dowd's main subject of research is private money and free banking—monetary and financial systems that operate without any government intervention and in the absence of any central bank. A related focus of his work is on central banking and other forms of state intervention into economies, most particularly, on deposit insurance, the lender of last resort and bank capital adequacy regulation. He has repeatedly called for the abolition of central banks and an end to state intervention in the financial system.

He advocates competitive monetary systems. His work, New Private Monies—a Bit-Part Player?, is supportive of private gold money systems such as the Liberty Dollar and e-gold. Dowd is a supporter of commodity-based monetary systems such as the gold standard and is a critic of fiat-based money issued by a central bank.

Dowd takes a largely Austrian approach to economics, but one that is heavily influenced by the Quantity Theory of Money and the work of monetarists such as Milton Friedman and David Laidler. He supports laissez-faire, and is critical of Keynesian and other interventionist schools of economics.

He has proposed a free-market approach to the resolution of the 2008 financial crisis, based on extended personal liability for senior bankers, the exit of the state from the financial system and the restoration of a sound monetary standard. To this end, he has also advised Steve Baker, the Conservative MP for Wycombe, on his two Private Member's Bills to resolve the crisis: the Financial Services (Regulation of Derivatives) Bill, which sought to restore sound accounting standards, and the Financial Institutions (Reform) Bill, which called for radical reforms to the banking system and an end to state involvement in banking.

Dowd has repeatedly argued that the 2008 financial crisis has never been properly resolved and that the policies adopted since 2007 have been ineffective, counter-productive and of dubious legality.

Dowd has also written extensively on financial risk measurement and management. He has argued that financial modelling is conceptually dubious because it is based on a naïve 'scientistic' belief that economic systems can be modelled using quantitative methods inappropriately imported from natural sciences such as physics. He is particularly critical of the widely used Value-at-Risk or VaR risk measure, the assumptions inherent to, and so the use of the "normal" or Gaussian distribution in risk management, and the use of financial risk models for regulatory purposes.

Dowd is the co-inventor of the PensionMetrics Defined-Contribution (DC) stochastic pension model, and the Stochastic Lifestyling asset allocation strategy. He and David Blake have proposed a set of good principles in the modelling of DC pension plans, and with Debbie Harrison, Blake and Dowd have recently published two reports into the state of the DC pensions market in the UK: Caveat Venditor, which advocated that pensions should be governed by the principle of seller not buyer beware, and VfM, which examined value for money in the UK pensions market. These reports were critical of the high charges, over-complexity and lack of transparency in the UK pensions industry.

In the life actuarial field, Dowd and collaborators have written on the financial implications of mortality and longevity risk. They invented survivor swaps, survivor swaptions, the CBD mortality model, and the gravity two-population mortality model.

== Publications ==
=== Books authored ===
- Laissez-Faire Banking (1993). London: Routledge.
- The State and the Monetary System (1989). New York: St. Martin's.
- Competition and Finance: A New Interpretation of Financial and Monetary Economics (1996). New York: St. Martin's.
- Beyond Value at Risk: The New Science of Risk Management (1998). Hoboken, New Jersey: John Wiley.
- Money and the Market: Essays on Free Banking (2001). London: Routledge.
- An Introduction to Market Risk Measurement (2002). Hoboken, New Jersey: John Wiley.
- Measuring Market Risk (2nd ed.). Hoboken, N.J.: John Wiley. 2005 [2002].
- Abolire le Banche Centrali. Milan, ITA: Istituto Bruno Leoni. 2009.
- [with Martin Hutchinson] (2010). Alchemists of Loss: How Modern Finance and Government Intervention Crashed the Financial System, Chichester, ENG: John Wiley.

=== Books edited ===
- The Experience of Free Banking (1992). London: Routledge.
- [co-edited with Mervyn K. Lewis] Current Issues in Financial and Monetary Economics (1992). London: Macmillan.
- [with Richard H. Timberlake] Money and the Nation State: The Financial Revolution, Government, and the World Monetary System. (1998). New Brunswick, New Jersey: Transaction Publishers, ISBN 978-1-56000-302-1.
- The Experience of Free Banking, second edition (2023). London: Institute of Economic Affairs.

=== Other significant works ===
- "Private Money—The Path to Monetary Stability". Hobart Paper. 112 (June). London: Institute of Economic Affairs. 1988.
- "New Private Monies—A Bit-Part Player?". Hobart Paper. 174 (June). London: Institute of Economic Affairs. 2014.
