= Cobden Centre =

British economics think tank

The Cobden Centre is a British economics think tank founded by Member of Parliament Steve Baker and entrepreneur Toby Baxendale. It was developed by and consists of proponents of the Austrian School of Economics. Contributors include MP Steve Baker, Professor Kevin Dowd, Gordon Kerr of Cobden Partners, MEP Dr Syed Kamall (the former head of the Conservative group in the European Parliament), former Cambridge University lecturer Jamie Whyte, former UKIP MP Douglas Carswell, Ivo Mosley and Keith Weiner. The editor is Max Rangeley.

== Primary areas of interest ==
- Business cycle theory
- Free market economic solutions
- Digital currencies such as Bitcoin
- Free trade

== Business cycle theory ==
The Cobden Centre espouses the Austrian Theory of the business cycle, sometimes known as "Hayek-Mises business cycle theory" after its two most famous proponents, Friedrich von Hayek and Ludwig von Mises.

The Cobden Centre is named after Richard Cobden, the 19th century classical liberal who campaigned against the Corn Laws and in favour of free trade and individual liberty. The Cobden Centre has a commercial arm called Cobden Partners, which offers advice on economics from an Austrian School perspective.
