= List of United Kingdom MPs by seniority (2005–2010) =

This is the list of United Kingdom MPs by seniority, 2005–2010. The Members of Parliament (MPs) are ranked by the beginning of their terms in office, in the House of Commons.

The constituencies and party affiliations listed reflect those during the 54th Parliament. Seats and party affiliations for other Parliaments will be different for certain members.

The House of Commons of the 54th Parliament was elected on 5 May 2005 and first met on 11 May 2005. The formal dissolution of this Parliament took place on 12 April 2010.

This article describes the criteria for seniority in the House of Commons, as set out in Factsheet M3 (The Father of the House) issued by the House of Commons Information Office and revised in June 2010.

== Seniority criteria ==
The criteria for seniority, used in this article, are derived from the way that the Father of the House is selected. They are not laid down in Standing Orders but arise from the customary practice of the House of Commons.

The modern custom is that the Father of the House is the MP who has the longest continuous service. If two or more members were first elected in the same General Election (or at by-elections held on the same day), then priority is given to the one who was sworn in first. The order of swearing in is recorded in Hansard, the official record of proceedings.

When a member has had broken service, that does not affect his or her seniority (for the purpose of qualifying as the Father of the House) which is based on the latest period of continuous service.

The Sinn Féin members, who abstain from taking their seats at Westminster, have never been sworn in. They are ranked (in this list) after all other members who have taken their seats. Between themselves they are ranked by the first date of election, for the current period of continuous service. If that criterion is equal, then they are ranked by alphabetical order of surnames.

In the House of Commons, the sole mandatory duty of the Father of the House is to preside over the election of a new Speaker whenever that office becomes vacant. The relevant Standing Order does not refer to this member by the title "Father of the House", referring instead to the longest-serving member of the House present who is not a Minister of the Crown (meaning that if the Father is absent or a government minister, the next person in line presides).

== Summary of members elected by party ==
Affiliation	Election	At dissolution
Labour Party	355	349
Conservative Party	198	193
Liberal Democrats	62	63
Democratic Unionist Party	9	8
Scottish National Party	6	7
Sinn Féin	5	5
Plaid Cymru	3	3
Social Democratic and Labour Party	3	3
Ulster Unionist Party	1	0
Health Concern	1	1
Respect – The Unity Coalition	1	1
Independent (Peter Law; Dai Davies, Sylvia Hermon, Andrew Pelling, Bob Spink, Bob Wareing)	1	5
Independent Labour (Clare Short)	0	1
Suspended Labour (Elliot Morley, David Chaytor, Jim Devine)	0	3
Suspended Conservative (Derek Conway)	0	1
Speaker	1	1
Vacant (North West Leicestershire, Strangford and Middlesbrough South and East Cleveland)	0	3
Total	646	646
Notional government majority	66	38
Working government majority	71	48

Note: The effective Government majority was higher than the notional majority, because MPs from Sinn Féin did not take their seats due to their long-standing policy of abstentionism and vacant seats have no vote. Technically, the speakers belong to parties in a notional majority, though they do not usually vote and therefore don't figure in an effective majority.

== List of Members of Parliament by seniority ==
This article assigns a numerical rank to each of the members elected in the 2005 general election and subsequent by-elections, except for those who were elected but never sworn in, who are displayed at the bottom without a number. Members shaded in pink ceased to be MPs during the course of the parliament.

Rank	Member	Party	Constituency 2005	Elected	Born	Died	Notes
43rd Parliament (elected: 15 October 1964)
001	Alan Williams	Lab	Swansea West	15 October 1964	14 Oct 1930	21 Dec 2014	Father of the House.
44th Parliament (elected: 31 March 1966, first met: 18 April 1966, dissolved: 29 May 1970)
002	Sir Peter Tapsell	C	Louth and Horncastle	31 March 1966	1 Feb 1930	17 Aug 2018	Previously served 1959–64.
45th Parliament (elected: 18 June 1970, first met: 29 June 1970, dissolved: 8 February 1974)
003	Patrick Cormack	C	South Staffordshire	18 June 1970	18 May 1939	25 Feb 2024	
004	Gavin Strang	Lab	Edinburgh East	18 June 1970	10 Jul 1943		
005	John Prescott	Lab	Kingston upon Hull East	18 June 1970	31 May 1938	20 Nov 2024	Deputy Leader, Lab (1994–2007)
006	Sir Gerald Kaufman	Lab	Manchester Gorton	18 June 1970	21 Jun 1930	26 Feb 2017	
007	Kenneth Clarke	C	Rushcliffe	18 June 1970	2 Jul 1940		
008	Michael Meacher	Lab	Oldham West and Royton	18 June 1970	4 Nov 1939	20 Oct 2015	
009	Dennis Skinner	Lab	Bolsover	18 June 1970	11 Feb 1932		
010	Ian Paisley	DUP	North Antrim	18 June 1970	6 Apr 1926	12 Sep 2014	Leader of the DUP (1971–2008)
011	Nicholas Winterton	C	Macclesfield	1 October 1971	31 Mar 1938		
012	Sir Alan Beith	LD	Berwick-upon-Tweed	8 November 1973	20 Apr 1943		
46th Parliament (elected: 28 February 1974, first met: 6 March 1974, dissolved: 20 September 1974)
013	Sir George Young, Bt	C	North West Hampshire	28 February 1974	16 Jul 1941		
014	Bruce George	Lab	Walsall South	28 February 1974	1 Jun 1942	24 Feb 2020	
015	Robin Cook	Lab	Livingston	28 February 1974	28 Feb 1946	6 Aug 2005	
016	Sir John Stanley	C	Tonbridge and Malling	28 February 1974	19 Jan 1942	28 Nov 2025	
017	Sir Peter Viggers	C	Gosport	28 February 1974	13 Mar 1938	19 Mar 2020	
018	Michael Spicer	C	West Worcestershire	28 February 1974	22 Jan 1943	29 May 2019	
019	Gwyneth Dunwoody	Lab	Crewe and Nantwich	28 February 1974	12 Dec 1930	7 Apr 2008	Previously served 1966–70. Longest-serving female member.
020	Anthony Steen	C	Totnes	28 February 1974	22 Jul 1939		
47th Parliament (elected: 10 October 1974, first met: 22 October 1974, dissolved: 7 April 1979)
021	Michael Mates	C	East Hampshire	10 October 1974	9 Jun 1934		
022	(Sir) Peter Bottomley	C	Worthing West	26 June 1975	30 Jul 1944		
023	Geoffrey Robinson	Lab	Coventry North West	4 March 1976	25 May 1938		
024	Austin Mitchell	Lab	Great Grimsby	28 April 1977	19 Sep 1934	18 Aug 2021	
025	Sir Alan Haselhurst	C	Saffron Walden	7 July 1977	23 Jun 1937		Previously served 1970–74
48th Parliament (elected: 3 May 1979, first met: 9 May 1979, dissolved: 13 May 1983)
026	Michael Martin	Speaker	Glasgow North East	3 May 1979	3 Jul 1945	29 Apr 2018	
027	David Winnick	Lab	Walsall North	3 May 1979	26 Jun 1933	25 Mar 2026	Previously served 1966–70
028	David Marshall	Lab	Glasgow East	3 May 1979	7 May 1941		
029	Barry Sheerman	Lab	Huddersfield	3 May 1979	17 Aug 1940		
030	Douglas Hogg	C	Sleaford and North Hykeham	3 May 1979	5 Feb 1945		
031	Frank Field	Lab	Birkenhead	3 May 1979	16 Jul 1942	23 Apr 2024	
032	Frank Dobson	Lab	Holborn and St Pancras	3 May 1979	15 Mar 1940	11 Nov 2019	
033	John Gummer	C	Suffolk Coastal	3 May 1979	26 Nov 1939		Previously served 1970–74
034	(Sir) Richard Shepherd	C	Aldridge-Brownhills	3 May 1979	6 Dec 1942	19 Feb 2022	
035	Peter Robinson	DUP	Belfast East	3 May 1979	29 Dec 1948		Leader of the DUP (2008–10)
036	Stephen Dorrell	C	Charnwood	3 May 1979	25 Mar 1952		
037	Jack Straw	Lab	Blackburn	3 May 1979	3 Aug 1946		
038	Tom Clarke	Lab	Coatbridge, Chryston and Bellshill	24 June 1982	10 Jan 1941		
039	Harriet Harman	Lab	Camberwell and Peckham	28 October 1982	30 Jul 1950		Deputy Leader, Lab (2007–15)
040	Simon Hughes	LD	North Southwark and Bermondsey	24 February 1983	17 May 1951		
49th Parliament (elected: 9 June 1983, first met: 15 June 1983, dissolved: 18 May 1987)
041	Sir Stuart Bell	Lab	Middlesbrough	9 June 1983	16 May 1938	13 Oct 2012	
042	Frank Cook	Lab	Stockton North	9 June 1983	3 Nov 1935	10 Jan 2012	
043	(Sir) Kevin Barron	Lab	Rother Valley	9 June 1983	26 Oct 1946		
044	Tony Blair	Lab	Sedgefield	9 June 1983	6 May 1953		Leader, Lab (1994-2007) and Prime Minister (1997-2007)
045	Tony Lloyd	Lab	Manchester Central	9 June 1983	25 Feb 1950	17 Jan 2024	
046	Richard Caborn	Lab	Sheffield Central	9 June 1983	6 Oct 1943		
047	(Sir) Edward Leigh	C	Gainsborough	9 June 1983	20 Jul 1950		
048	Bob Wareing	Lab	Liverpool West Derby	9 June 1983	20 Aug 1930	1 May 2015	
049	Nick Brown	Lab	Newcastle upon Tyne East and Wallsend	9 June 1983	13 Jun 1950		Chief Whip, Lab (2008-7 October 2010)
050	Jeremy Corbyn	Lab	Islington North	9 June 1983	26 May 1949		
051	(Sir) David Amess	C	Southend West	9 June 1983	26 Mar 1952	15 Oct 2021	
052	Eric Forth	C	Bromley and Chislehurst	9 June 1983	9 Sep 1944	17 May 2006	
053	Sir John Butterfill	C	Bournemouth West	9 June 1983	14 Feb 1941	7 Nov 2021	
054	(Sir) Roger Gale	C	North Thanet	9 June 1983	20 Aug 1943		
055	Peter Lilley	C	Hitchin and Harpenden	9 June 1983	23 Aug 1943		
056	Ann Winterton	C	Congleton	9 June 1983	6 Mar 1941		
057	Michael Lord	C	Central Suffolk and North Ipswich	9 June 1983	17 Oct 1938		
058	(Sir) Nicholas Soames	C	Mid Sussex	9 June 1983	12 Feb 1948		
059	Robert Key	C	Salisbury	9 June 1983	22 Apr 1945	3 Feb 2023	
060	Tim Yeo	C	South Suffolk	9 June 1983	20 Mar 1945		
061	Charles Kennedy	LD	Ross, Skye and Lochaber	9 June 1983	25 Nov 1959	1 Jun 2015	
062	Michael Howard	C	Folkestone and Hythe	9 June 1983	7 Jul 1941		
063	David Heathcoat-Amory	C	Wells	9 June 1983	21 Mar 1949		
064	(Sir) Tony Baldry	C	Banbury	9 June 1983	10 Jul 1950		
065	Andrew MacKay	C	Bracknell	9 June 1983	27 Aug 1949		Previously served 1977–79
066	(Sir) Malcolm Bruce	LD	Gordon	9 June 1983	17 Nov 1944		
067	(Dame) Margaret Beckett	Lab	Derby South	9 June 1983	15 Jan 1943		Previously served 1974–79
068	Harry Cohen	Lab	Leyton and Wanstead	9 June 1983	10 Dec 1949		
069	Mark Fisher	Lab	Stoke-on-Trent Central	9 June 1983	29 Oct 1944	26 Nov 2025	
070	Gordon Brown	Lab	Kirkcaldy and Cowdenbeath	9 June 1983	20 Feb 1951		Leader, Lab and Prime Minister (2007-11 May 2010)
071	Clare Short	Lab	Birmingham Ladywood	9 June 1983	15 Feb 1946		
072	David Maclean	C	Penrith and The Border	28 July 1983	16 May 1953		
073	(Sir) Bill Cash	C	Stone	3 June 1984	10 May 1940		
074	Ann Clwyd	Lab	Cynon Valley	3 June 1984	21 Mar 1937	21 Jul 2023	
075	Patrick McLoughlin	C	West Derbyshire	8 May 1986	30 Nov 1957		Chief Whip, C (2005-4 September 2012)
076	David Clelland	Lab	Tyne Bridge	6 December 1985	27 Jun 1943		
077	George Howarth	Lab	Knowsley North and Sefton East	13 November 1986	29 Jun 1949	2026	
078	Matthew Taylor	LD	Truro and St Austell	12 March 1987	3 Jan 1963		
50th Parliament (elected: 11 June 1987, first met: 17 June 1987, dissolved: 16 March 1992)
079	David Blunkett	Lab	Sheffield Brightside	11 June 1987	6 Jun 1947		
080	John Redwood	C	Wokingham	11 June 1987	15 Jun 1951		
081	John McFall	Lab	West Dunbartonshire	11 June 1987	4 Oct 1944		
082	Eric Illsley	Lab	Barnsley Central	11 June 1987	9 Apr 1955		
083	Alun Michael	Lab	Cardiff South and Penarth	11 June 1987	22 Aug 1943		
084	Ronnie Campbell	Lab	Blyth Valley	11 June 1987	14 Aug 1943	23 Feb 2024	
085	David Davis	C	Haltemprice and Howden	11 June 1987	23 Dec 1948		
086	David Curry	C	Skipton and Ripon	11 June 1987	13 Jun 1944		
087	(Sir) Alan Meale	Lab	Mansfield	11 June 1987	31 Jul 1949		
088	Elliot Morley	Lab	Scunthorpe	11 June 1987	6 Jul 1952		
089	Eric Martlew	Lab	Carlisle	11 June 1987	3 Jan 1949		
090	Tommy McAvoy	Lab	Rutherglen and Hamilton West	11 June 1987	14 Dec 1943	8 Mar 2024	
091	David Wilshire	C	Spelthorne	11 June 1987	16 Sep 1943	31 Oct 2023	
092	David Tredinnick	C	Bosworth	11 June 1987	19 Jan 1950		
093	Ian McCartney	Lab	Makerfield	11 June 1987	25 Apr 1951		
094	Ian Taylor	C	Esher and Walton	11 June 1987	18 Apr 1945		
095	John Greenway	C	Ryedale	11 June 1987	15 Feb 1946		
096	Michael Jack	C	Fylde	11 June 1987	17 Sep 1946		
097	Andrew Smith	Lab	Oxford East	11 June 1987	1 Feb 1951		
098	Doug Henderson	Lab	Newcastle upon Tyne North	11 June 1987	9 Jun 1949		
099	John Reid	Lab	Airdrie and Shotts	11 June 1987	8 May 1947		
100	Alistair Darling	Lab	Edinburgh South West	11 June 1987	28 Nov 1953	30 Nov 2023	
101	Quentin Davies	Lab	Grantham and Stamford	11 June 1987	29 May 1944	13 Jan 2025	
102	Ann Widdecombe	C	Maidstone and The Weald	11 June 1987	4 Oct 1947		
103	Simon Burns	C	Chelmsford West	11 June 1987	6 Sep 1952		
104	Keith Vaz	Lab	Leicester East	11 June 1987	26 Nov 1956		
105	John Cummings	Lab	Easington	11 June 1987	6 Jul 1943	4 Jan 2017	
106	Nigel Griffiths	Lab	Edinburgh South	11 June 1987	20 May 1955		
107	Paul Flynn	Lab	Newport West	11 June 1987			
108	Paul Murphy	Lab	Torfaen	11 June 1987			
109	Jimmy Hood	Lab	Lanark and Hamilton East	11 June 1987			
110	Adam Ingram	Lab	East Kilbride, Strathaven and Lesmahagow	11 June 1987	1 Feb 1947		
111	(Dame) Dawn Primarolo	Lab	Bristol South	11 June 1987			
112	Joan Walley	Lab	Stoke-on-Trent North	11 June 1987			
113	Graham Allen	Lab	Nottingham North	11 June 1987			
114	Malcolm Moss	C	North East Cambridgeshire	11 June 1987	6 Mar 1943		
115	Julian Brazier	C	Canterbury	11 June 1987			
116	James Arbuthnot	C	North East Hampshire	11 June 1987			
117	Tim Boswell	C	Daventry	11 June 1987	2 Dec 1942	30 Aug 2025	
118	Hilary Armstrong	Lab	North West Durham	11 June 1987	30 Nov 1945		
119	George Galloway	Res	Bethnal Green and Bow	11 June 1987	16 Aug 1954		Previously MP for Glasgow Hillhead until 2005
120	(Dame) Joan Ruddock	Lab	Lewisham Deptford	11 June 1987			
121	(Sir) Jim Paice	C	South East Cambridgeshire	11 June 1987			
122	Eddie McGrady	SDLP	South Down	11 June 1987	3 Jun 1935	11 Nov 2013	
123	Chris Mullin	Lab	Sunderland South	11 June 1987	12 Dec 1947		
124	Jim Cousins	Lab	Newcastle upon Tyne Central	11 June 1987	23 Feb 1944		
125	John Battle	Lab	Leeds West	11 June 1987	26 Apr 1952		
126	Diane Abbott	Lab	Hackney North and Stoke Newington	11 June 1987			
127	Alex Salmond	SNP	Banff and Buchan	11 June 1987	31 Dec 1954	12 Oct 2024	
128	Sir Menzies Campbell	LD	North East Fife	11 June 1987			
129	Martyn Jones	Lab	Clwyd South	11 June 1987	1 Mar 1947		
130	William Hague	C	Richmond (Yorks)	23 February 1989			
131	Kim Howells	Lab	Pontypridd	23 February 1989	27 Nov 1946		
132	Kate Hoey	Lab	Vauxhall	15 June 1989			
133	Eddie O'Hara	Lab	Knowsley South	28 September 1990	1 Oct 1937	28 May 2016	
134	Joe Benton	Lab	Bootle	8 November 1990			
135	Terry Rooney	Lab	Bradford North	11 Nov 1950			
136	Peter Hain	Lab	Neath	4 April 1991			
137	Peter Kilfoyle	Lab	Liverpool Walton	4 July 1991	9 Jun 1946		
51st Parliament (elected: 9 April 1992, first met: 27 April 1992, dissolved: 8 April 1997)
138	Ian Davidson	Lab	Glasgow South West	9 April 1992			
139	Jim Cunningham	Lab	Coventry South	9 April 1992			
140	Jane Kennedy	Lab	Liverpool Wavertree	9 April 1992	4 May 1958		
141	Rachel Squire	Lab	Dunfermline and West Fife	9 April 1992	13 Jul 1954	5 Jan 2006	
142	Michael Connarty	Lab	Linlithgow and East Falkirk	9 April 1992			
143	Michael Ancram	C	Devizes	9 April 1992	7 Jul 1945	1 Oct 2024	Previously served 1974–74 and 1979–87
144	John Hutton	Lab	Barrow and Furness	9 April 1992	6 May 1955		
145	Alan Simpson	Lab	Nottingham South	9 April 1992	20 Sep 1948		
146	Piara Khabra	Lab	Ealing Southall	9 April 1992	20 Nov 1921	19 Jun 2007	
147	Don Foster	LD	Bath	9 April 1992			
148	John Horam	C	Orpington	9 April 1992	7 Mar 1939		Previously served 1970–83
149	Andrew MacKinlay	Lab	Thurrock	9 April 1992	24 Apr 1949		
150	Andrew Miller	Lab	Ellesmere Port and Neston	9 April 1992			
151	Richard Burden	Lab	Birmingham Northfield	9 April 1992			
152	(Sir) Edward Garnier	C	Harborough	9 April 1992			
153	Liam Fox	C	Woodspring	9 April 1992			
154	Geoff Hoon	Lab	Ashfield	9 April 1992	6 Dec 1953		
155	Bill Olner	Lab	Nuneaton	9 April 1992	9 May 1942	18 May 2020	
156	Michael Clapham	Lab	Barnsley West and Penistone	9 April 1992	15 May 1943		
157	Mike O'Brien	Lab	North Warwickshire	9 April 1992	19 Jun 1954		
158	Bill Etherington	Lab	Sunderland North	9 April 1992	17 Jul 1941		
159	David Lidington	C	Aylesbury	9 April 1992			
160	Oliver Heald	C	North East Hertfordshire	9 April 1992			
161	Geoffrey Clifton-Brown	C	Cotswold	9 April 1992			
162	Alan Milburn	Lab	Darlington	9 April 1992	27 Jan 1958		
163	David Hanson	Lab	Delyn	9 April 1992			
164	Hugh Bayley	Lab	York Central	9 April 1992			
165	Gary Streeter	C	South West Devon	9 April 1992			
166	(Sir) Peter Luff	C	Mid Worcestershire	9 April 1992			
167	Michael Fabricant	C	Lichfield	9 April 1992			
168	Nick Ainger	Lab	Carmarthen West and South Pembrokeshire	9 April 1992	24 Oct 1949		
169	Clive Betts	Lab	Sheffield Attercliffe	9 April 1992			
170	Elfyn Llwyd	PC	Meirionnydd Nant Conwy	9 April 1992			Parliamentary group leader: PC
171	Paddy Tipping	Lab	Sherwood	9 April 1992	24 Oct 1949		
172	Lynne Jones	Lab	Birmingham Selly Oak	9 April 1992	26 Apr 1951		
173	Ann Coffey	Lab	Stockport	9 April 1992			
174	John Heppell	Lab	Nottingham East	9 April 1992	3 Nov 1948		
175	John Austin	Lab	Erith and Thamesmead	9 April 1992	21 Aug 1944		
176	Bob Ainsworth	Lab	Coventry North East	9 April 1992			
177	Alan Duncan	C	Rutland and Melton	9 April 1992			
178	Jim Dowd	Lab	Lewisham West	9 April 1992			
179	Peter Atkinson	C	Hexham	9 April 1992	19 Jan 1943		
180	Keith Hill	Lab	Streatham	9 April 1992	28 Jul 1943		
181	Sir Paul Beresford	C	Mole Valley	9 April 1992			
182	Greg Pope	Lab	Hyndburn	9 April 1992	29 Aug 1960		
183	Janet Anderson	Lab	Rossendale and Darwen	9 April 1992	6 Dec 1949	6 Dec 2023	
184	(Sir) Nick Harvey	LD	North Devon	9 April 1992			
185	Iain Duncan Smith	C	Chingford and Woodford Green	9 April 1992			
186	Glenda Jackson	Lab	Hampstead and Highgate	9 April 1992			
187	Malcolm Wicks	Lab	Croydon North	9 April 1992		29 Sep 2012	
188	Richard Spring	C	West Suffolk	9 April 1992	24 Sep 1946		
189	Mike Gapes	Lab	Ilford South	9 April 1992			
190	Nigel Evans	C	Ribble Valley	9 April 1992			
191	Angela Browning	C	Tiverton and Honiton	9 April 1992	4 Dec 1946		
192	Tony Wright	Lab	Cannock Chase	9 April 1992	11 Mar 1948		
193	Stephen Byers	Lab	North Tyneside	9 April 1992	13 Apr 1953		
194	David Willetts	C	Havant	9 April 1992			
195	Peter Ainsworth	C	East Surrey	9 April 1992	19 Nov 1956	6 Apr 2021	
196	Cheryl Gillan	C	Chesham and Amersham	9 April 1992			
197	Brian Donohoe	Lab	Central Ayrshire	9 April 1992			
198	John Denham	Lab	Southampton Itchen	9 April 1992			
199	Neil Gerrard	Lab	Walthamstow	9 April 1992	3 Jul 1942		
200	James Clappison	C	Hertsmere	9 April 1992			
201	Bernard Jenkin	C	North Essex	9 April 1992			
202	(Sir) Richard Ottaway	C	Croydon South	9 April 1992			Previously served 1983–87
203	Eric Pickles	C	Brentwood and Ongar	9 April 1992			
204	Gordon Prentice	Lab	Pendle	9 April 1992	28 Jan 1951		
205	Bridget Prentice	Lab	Lewisham East	9 April 1992	28 Dec 1952		
206	Nigel Waterson	C	Eastbourne	9 April 1992	12 Oct 1950		
207	(Dame) Tessa Jowell	Lab	Dulwich and West Norwood	9 April 1992			
208	Angela Eagle	Lab	Wallasey	9 April 1992			
209	John Whittingdale	C	Maldon and East Chelmsford	9 April 1992			
210	Alan Keen	Lab	Feltham and Heston	9 April 1992		10 Nov 2011	
211	John Spellar	Lab	Warley	9 April 1992			Previously served 1982–83
212	Roger Godsiff	Lab	Birmingham Sparkbrook and Small Heath	9 April 1992			
213	George Mudie	Lab	Leeds East	9 April 1992			
214	Roger Berry	Lab	Kingswood	9 April 1992	4 Jul 1948		
215	Nick Raynsford	Lab	Greenwich and Woolwich	9 April 1992			Previously served 1986–87
216	Andrew Robathan	C	Blaby	9 April 1992			
217	Denis MacShane	Lab	Rotherham	5 May 1994			
218	Margaret, Lady Hodge	Lab	Barking	9 June 1994			
219	Gerry Sutcliffe	Lab	Bradford South	9 June 1994			
220	Stephen Timms	Lab	East Ham	9 June 1994			
221	Ian Pearson	Lab	Dudley South	15 December 1994	5 Apr 1959		
222	Don Touhig	Lab	Islwyn	16 February 1995	5 Dec 1947		
223	Jon Trickett	Lab	Hemsworth	1 February 1996			
224	Brian Jenkins	Lab	Tamworth	11 April 1996	19 Sep 1942		
225	Jeffrey Ennis	Lab	Barnsley East and Mexborough	12 December 1996	13 Nov 1952		
226	Ben Chapman	Lab	Wirral South	28 February 1997	8 Jul 1940		
52nd Parliament (elected: 1 May 1997, first met: 7 May 1997, dissolved: 14 May 2001)
227	Francis Maude	C	Horsham	1 May 1997			Previously served 1983–92
228	Frank Doran	Lab	Aberdeen North	1 May 1997			Previously served 1987–92
229	Anne McIntosh	C	Vale of York	1 May 1997			
230	Keith Simpson	C	Mid Norfolk	1 May 1997			
231	Julian Lewis	C	New Forest East	1 May 1997			
232	Owen Paterson	C	North Shropshire	1 May 1997			
233	Laurence Robertson	C	Tewkesbury	1 May 1997			
234	Robert Syms	C	Poole	1 May 1997			
235	Ben Bradshaw	Lab	Exeter	1 May 1997			
236	Fraser Kemp	Lab	Houghton and Washington East	1 May 1997	1 Sep 1958		
237	Ian Cawsey	Lab	Brigg and Goole	1 May 1997	14 Apr 1960		
238	Rudi Vis	Lab	Finchley and Golders Green	1 May 1997	4 Apr 1941	3 May 2010	
239	Andrew Lansley	C	South Cambridgeshire	1 May 1997			
240	Mike Hancock	LD	Portsmouth South	1 May 1997			Previously served 1984–87.
241	Lembit Öpik	LD	Montgomeryshire	1 May 1997	2 Mar 1965		
242	Ed Davey	LD	Kingston and Surbiton	1 May 1997			
243	Paul Burstow	LD	Sutton and Cheam	1 May 1997			
244	Denis Murphy	Lab	Wansbeck	1 May 1997	2 Nov 1948		
245	Des Turner	Lab	Brighton Kemptown	1 May 1997	17 Jul 1939		
246	Helen Jones	Lab	Warrington North	1 May 1997			
247	Joan Humble	Lab	Blackpool North and Fleetwood	1 May 1997	3 Mar 1951		
248	Andrew Dismore	Lab	Hendon	1 May 1997	2 Sep 1954		
249	Tony McNulty	Lab	Harrow East	1 May 1997	3 Nov 1958		
250	Jim Fitzpatrick	Lab	Poplar and Canning Town	1 May 1997			
251	Judy Mallaber	Lab	Amber Valley	1 May 1997	10 Jul 1951		
252	Linda Gilroy	Lab	Plymouth Sutton	1 May 1997	19 Jul 1949		
253	Christine Russell	Lab	City of Chester	1 May 1997	25 Mar 1945		
254	Jeffrey Donaldson	DUP	Lagan Valley	1 May 1997			
255	John McDonnell	Lab	Hayes and Harlington	1 May 1997			
256	Gareth Thomas	Lab	Harrow West	1 May 1997			
257	Mark Todd	Lab	South Derbyshire	1 May 1997	29 Dec 1954		
258	Ann Keen	Lab	Brentford and Isleworth	1 May 1997	26 Nov 1948		
259	Colin Burgon	Lab	Elmet	1 May 1997	22 Apr 1948		
260	John Maples	C	Stratford-on-Avon	1 May 1997	22 Apr 1943	9 Jun 2012	Previously served 1983–92
261	Eleanor Laing	C	Epping Forest	1 May 1997			
262	(Sir) Andrew Stunell	LD	Hazel Grove	1 May 1997			
263	Phyllis Starkey	Lab	Milton Keynes South West	1 May 1997	4 Jan 1947		
264	Jacqui Smith	Lab	Redditch	1 May 1997	3 Nov 1962		
265	Paul Keetch	LD	Hereford	1 May 1997	21 May 1961	24 May 2017	
266	Paul Goggins	Lab	Wythenshawe and Sale East	1 May 1997		7 Jan 2014	
267	Hazel Blears	Lab	Salford	1 May 1997			
268	Stephen Pound	Lab	Ealing North	1 May 1997			
269	Ian Stewart	Lab	Eccles	1 May 1997	28 Aug 1950		
270	Lindsay Hoyle	Lab	Chorley	1 May 1997			
271	Howard Stoate	Lab	Dartford	1 May 1997	14 Apr 1954		
272	Beverley Hughes	Lab	Stretford and Urmston	1 May 1997	30 Mar 1950		
273	John Healey	Lab	Wentworth	1 May 1997			
274	Louise Ellman	Lab	Liverpool Riverside	1 May 1997			
275	Philip Hammond	C	Runnymede and Weybridge	1 May 1997			
276	Tim Loughton	C	East Worthing and Shoreham	1 May 1997			
277	Shaun Woodward	Lab	St Helens South	1 May 1997			
278	James Plaskitt	Lab	Warwick and Leamington	1 May 1997	23 Jun 1954		
279	Vince Cable	LD	Twickenham	1 May 1997			Deputy Leader, LD (2 March 2006 – 26 May 2010)
280	Adrian Sanders	LD	Torbay	1 May 1997			
281	David Heath	LD	Somerton and Frome	1 May 1997			
282	Bill Rammell	Lab	Harlow	1 May 1997	10 Oct 1959		
283	Mark Oaten	LD	Winchester	1 May 1997	8 Mar 1964		
284	Tom Brake	LD	Carshalton and Wallington	1 May 1997			
285	Fiona Mactaggart	Lab	Slough	1 May 1997			
286	Gillian Merron	Lab	Lincoln	1 May 1997	12 Apr 1959		
287	Kelvin Hopkins	Lab	Luton North	1 May 1997			
288	Theresa May	C	Maidenhead	1 May 1997			
289	Graham Brady	C	Altrincham and Sale West	1 May 1997			
290	Martin Caton	Lab	Gower	1 May 1997			
291	John Bercow	C	Buckingham	1 May 1997	19 Jan 1963		Elected Speaker in 2009 to replace Michael Martin.
292	Nick Gibb	C	Bognor Regis and Littlehampton	1 May 1997			
293	Stephen Ladyman	Lab	South Thanet	1 May 1997	6 Nov 1952		
294	Stephen Hepburn	Lab	Jarrow	1 May 1997			
295	Alan Whitehead	Lab	Southampton Test	1 May 1997			
296	Barbara Follett	Lab	Stevenage	1 May 1997	25 Dec 1942		
297	Gisela Stuart	Lab	Birmingham Edgbaston	1 May 1997			
298	Patricia Hewitt	Lab	Leicester West	1 May 1997	2 Dec 1948		
299	Nick Palmer	Lab	Broxtowe	1 May 1997	5 Feb 1950		
300	Paul Clark	Lab	Gillingham	1 May 1997	29 Apr 1957		
301	Alan Johnson	Lab	Kingston upon Hull West and Hessle	1 May 1997			
302	Julie Morgan	Lab	Cardiff North	1 May 1997	2 Nov 1944		
303	Charles Clarke	Lab	Norwich South	1 May 1997	21 Sep 1950		
304	Claire Ward	Lab	Watford	1 May 1997	9 May 1972		
305	Michael Wills	Lab	Swindon North	1 May 1997	20 May 1952		
306	Gwyn Prosser	Lab	Dover	1 May 1997	27 Apr 1943		
307	Charlotte Atkins	Lab	Staffordshire Moorlands	1 May 1997	24 Sep 1950		
308	Barry Gardiner	Lab	Brent North	1 May 1997			
309	Margaret Moran	Lab	Luton South	1 May 1997	24 Apr 1955		
310	Caroline Flint	Lab	Don Valley	1 May 1997			
311	Andrew Tyrie	C	Chichester	1 May 1997			
312	Phil Woolas	Lab	Oldham East and Saddleworth	1 May 1997	11 Dec 1959	14 Mar 2026	
313	Dominic Grieve	C	Beaconsfield	1 May 1997			
314	David Crausby	Lab	Bolton North East	1 May 1997			
315	Andy Love	Lab	Edmonton	1 May 1997			
316	Bob Marshall-Andrews	Lab	Medway	1 May 1997	10 Apr 1944		
317	David Lepper	Lab	Brighton Pavilion	1 May 1997	15 Sep 1945		
318	Martin Linton	Lab	Battersea	1 May 1997	11 Aug 1944		
319	David Ruffley	C	Bury St Edmunds	1 May 1997			
320	Norman Baker	LD	Lewes	1 May 1997			
321	Desmond Swayne	C	New Forest West	1 May 1997			
322	Joan Ryan	Lab	Enfield North	1 May 1997	8 Sep 1955		
323	(Dame) Anne Begg	Lab	Aberdeen South	1 May 1997			
324	Bob Blizzard	Lab	Waveney	1 May 1997	31 May 1950	5 May 2022	
325	Christine McCafferty	Lab	Calder Valley	1 May 1997	14 Oct 1945		
326	Mohammad Sarwar	Lab	Glasgow Central	1 May 1997	1 Jan 1950		
327	Bob Laxton	Lab	Derby North	1 May 1997	7 Sep 1944		
328	Paul Truswell	Lab	Pudsey	1 May 1997	17 Nov 1955		
329	John Grogan	Lab	Selby	1 May 1997	24 Feb 1961		
330	Fabian Hamilton	Lab	Leeds North East	1 May 1997			
331	Marsha Singh	Lab	Bradford West	1 May 1997			
332	Caroline Spelman	C	Meriden	1 May 1997			
333	(Sir) Gerald Howarth	C	Aldershot	1 May 1997			Previously served 1983–92
334	Humfrey Malins	C	Woking	1 May 1997	31 Jul 1945		Previously served 1983–92
335	Michael Fallon	C	Sevenoaks	1 May 1997			Previously served 1983–92
336	Mike Wood	Lab	Batley and Spen	1 May 1997			
337	Phil Willis	LD	Harrogate and Knaresborough	1 May 1997	30 Nov 1941		
338	Colin Breed	LD	South East Cornwall	1 May 1997	4 May 1947	9 May 2024	
339	Damian Green	C	Ashford	1 May 1997			
340	James Gray	C	North Wiltshire	1 May 1997			
341	Evan Harris	LD	Oxford West and Abingdon	1 May 1997	21 Oct 1965		
342	Claire Curtis-Thomas	Lab	Crosby	1 May 1997	30 Apr 1958		
343	Chris Ruane	Lab	Vale of Clwyd	1 May 1997			
344	Alan Campbell	Lab	Tynemouth	1 May 1997			
345	Steve Webb	LD	Northavon	1 May 1997			
346	Ashok Kumar	Lab	Middlesbrough South and East Cleveland	1 May 1997	28 May 1956	5 Mar 2010	
347	Maria Eagle	Lab	Liverpool Garston	1 May 1997			
348	Rosie Winterton	Lab	Doncaster Central	1 May 1997			
349	Kali Mountford	Lab	Colne Valley	1 May 1997	12 Jan 1954		
350	Brian Iddon	Lab	Bolton South East	1 May 1997	5 Jul 1940		
351	Ivan Lewis	Lab	Bury South	1 May 1997			
352	Gordon Marsden	Lab	Blackpool South	1 May 1997			
353	David Kidney	Lab	Stafford	1 May 1997	21 Mar 1955		
354	Ian Gibson	Lab	Norwich North	1 May 1997	23 Sep 1938	9 Apr 2021	
355	Geraldine Smith	Lab	Morecambe and Lunesdale	1 May 1997	29 Aug 1961		
356	Michael Moore	LD	Berwickshire, Roxburgh and Selkirk	1 May 1997			
357	Sir Robert Smith, Bt	LD	West Aberdeenshire and Kincardine	1 May 1997			
358	Tony Wright	Lab	Great Yarmouth	1 May 1997	12 Aug 1954		
359	Angela Smith	Lab	Basildon	1 May 1997	7 Jan 1959		
360	Clive Efford	Lab	Eltham	1 May 1997			
361	David Drew	Lab	Stroud	1 May 1997	13 Apr 1952		
362	Betty Williams	Lab	Conwy	1 May 1997	31 Jul 1944		
363	Ann Cryer	Lab	Keighley	1 May 1997	14 Dec 1939		
364	Stephen Hesford	Lab	Wirral West	1 May 1997	27 May 1957		
365	Michael Foster	Lab	Hastings and Rye	1 May 1997	26 Feb 1946		
366	Mike Foster	Lab	Worcester	1 May 1997	14 Mar 1963		
367	Janet Dean	Lab	Burton	1 May 1997	28 Jan 1949		
368	Mike Hall	Lab	Weaver Vale	1 May 1997	20 Sep 1952		
369	Karen Buck	Lab	Regent's Park and Kensington North	1 May 1997			
370	Steve McCabe	Lab	Birmingham Hall Green	1 May 1997			
371	Jim Dobbin	Lab	Heywood and Middleton	1 May 1997		6 Sep 2014	
372	Graham Stringer	Lab	Manchester Blackley	1 May 1997			
373	Patrick Hall	Lab	Bedford	1 May 1997	20 Oct 1951		
374	Derek Wyatt	Lab	Sittingbourne and Sheppey	1 May 1997	4 Dec 1949		
375	Andrew George	LD	St Ives	1 May 1997			
376	John Hayes	C	South Holland and The Deepings	1 May 1997			
377	David Taylor	Lab	North West Leicestershire	1 May 1997	22 Aug 1946	25 Dec 2009	
378	Andy Reed	Lab	Loughborough	1 May 1997	17 Sep 1964		
379	Dari Taylor	Lab	Stockton South	1 May 1997	13 Dec 1944		
380	Phil Hope	Lab	Corby	1 May 1997	19 Apr 1955		
381	Dave Watts	Lab	St Helens North	1 May 1997			
382	Helen Southworth	Lab	Warrington South	1 May 1997	13 Nov 1956		
383	Oliver Letwin	C	West Dorset	1 May 1997			
384	Liz Blackman	Lab	Erewash	1 May 1997	26 Sep 1949		
385	Laura Moffatt	Lab	Crawley	1 May 1997	9 Apr 1954		
386	Yvette Cooper	Lab	Pontefract and Castleford	1 May 1997			
387	John Smith	Lab	Vale of Glamorgan	1 May 1997	17 Mar 1951		Previously served 1989–92
388	Jonathan Shaw	Lab	Chatham and Aylesford	1 May 1997	3 Jun 1966		
389	Vernon Coaker	Lab	Gedling	1 May 1997			
390	Jim Murphy	Lab	East Renfrewshire	1 May 1997			
391	Sandra Osborne	Lab	Ayr, Carrick and Cumnock	1 May 1997			
392	Russell Brown	Lab	Dumfries and Galloway	1 May 1997			
393	(Sir) Bob Russell	LD	Colchester	1 May 1997			
394	Crispin Blunt	C	Reigate	1 May 1997			
395	Tom Levitt	Lab	High Peak	1 May 1997	10 Apr 1954		
396	Des Browne	Lab	Kilmarnock and Loudoun	1 May 1997	22 Mar 1952		
397	Rosemary McKenna	Lab	Cumbernauld, Kilsyth and Kirkintilloch East	1 May 1997	8 May 1941		
398	David Borrow	Lab	South Ribble	1 May 1997	2 Aug 1952		
399	Bob Walter	C	North Dorset	1 May 1997			
400	Sally Keeble	Lab	Northampton North	1 May 1997	13 Oct 1951		
401	Martin Salter	Lab	Reading West	1 May 1997	19 Apr 1954		
402	Julie Kirkbride	C	Bromsgrove	1 May 1997	5 Jun 1960		
403	Derek Twigg	Lab	Halton	1 May 1997			
404	Ken Purchase	Lab	Wolverhampton North East	1 May 1997	8 Jan 1939	28 Aug 2016	
405	Siobhain McDonagh	Lab	Mitcham and Morden	1 May 1997			
406	Christopher Chope	C	Christchurch	1 May 1997			Previously served 1983–92
407	Shona McIsaac	Lab	Cleethorpes	1 May 1997	6 Apr 1960		
408	Ruth Kelly	Lab	Bolton West	1 May 1997	9 May 1968		
409	Frank Roy	Lab	Motherwell and Wishaw	1 May 1997			
410	David Chaytor	Lab	Bury North	1 May 1997	3 Aug 1949		
411	(Dame) Anne McGuire	Lab	Stirling	1 May 1997			
412	Sylvia Heal	Lab	Halesowen and Rowley Regis	1 May 1997	20 Jul 1942		Previously served 1990–92
413	Doug Naysmith	Lab	Bristol North West	1 May 1997	1 Apr 1941	2 Jul 2023	
414	Dan Norris	Lab	Wansdyke	28 Jan 1960			
415	John Randall	C	Uxbridge	31 July 1997			
416	Douglas Alexander	Lab	Paisley and Renfrewshire South	6 November 1997			
417	Jacqui Lait	C	Beckenham	20 November 1997	16 Dec 1947		Previously MP for Hastings and Rye 1992–97
418	Hilary Benn	Lab	Leeds Central	10 June 1999			
419	Neil Turner	Lab	Wigan	23 May 1999	16 Sep 1945		
420	Stephen O'Brien	C	Eddisbury	22 July 1999			
421	Sandra Gidley	Lab	Romsey	5 May 2000	6 Mar 1957		
422	David Lammy	Lab	Tottenham	22 June 2000			
423	John Robertson	Lab	Glasgow North West	23 November 2000			
424	Mark Hendrick	Lab	Preston	23 November 2000			
425	Adrian Bailey	Lab	West Bromwich West	23 November 2000			
426	Eric Joyce	Lab	Falkirk	22 December 2000			
53rd Parliament (elected: 7 June 2001, first met: 13 June 2001, dissolved: 11 April 2005)
427	Greg Knight	C	East Yorkshire	7 June 2001			Previously served 1983–97
428	Richard Bacon	C	South Norfolk	7 June 2001			
429	Meg Munn	Lab	Sheffield Heeley	7 June 2001			
430	Iris Robinson	DUP	Strangford	7 June 2001	16 Sep 1949		
431	Nigel Dodds	DUP	Belfast North	7 June 2001			
432	Gregory Campbell	DUP	East Londonderry	7 June 2001			
433	Bill Wiggin	C	Leominster	7 June 2001			
434	Andrew Rosindell	C	Romford	7 June 2001			
435	David Cameron	C	Witney	7 June 2001			Leader, C
436	Kevin Brennan	Lab	Cardiff West	7 June 2001			
437	Colin Challen	Lab	Morley and Rothwell	7 June 2001	2 Jun 1953		
438	Mark Lazarowicz	Lab	Edinburgh North and Leith	7 June 2001			
439	Wayne David	Lab	Caerphilly	7 June 2001			
440	Chris Grayling	C	Epsom and Ewell	7 June 2001			
441	Jon Cruddas	Lab	Dagenham	7 June 2001			
442	Ann McKechin	Lab	Glasgow North	7 June 2001			
443	Tom Watson	Lab	West Bromwich East	7 June 2001			
444	Andy Burnham	Lab	Leigh	7 June 2001			
445	James Purnell	Lab	Stalybridge and Hyde	7 June 2001	2 Mar 1970		
446	David Wright	Lab	Telford	7 June 2001			
447	Anne Moffat	Lab	East Lothian	7 June 2001	30 Mar 1958		
448	David Miliband	Lab	South Shields	7 June 2001			
449	John Mann	Lab	Bassetlaw	7 June 2001			
450	Kevan Jones	Lab	North Durham	7 June 2001			
451	John Barrett	LD	Edinburgh West	7 June 2001	11 Feb 1954		
452	Alistair Carmichael	LD	Orkney and Shetland	7 June 2001			
453	Alan Reid	LD	Argyll and Bute	7 June 2001			
454	John Thurso	LD	Caithness, Sutherland and Easter Ross	7 June 2001			Previously in House of Lords as the 3rd Viscount Thurso 1995–99
455	David Hamilton	Lab	Midlothian	7 June 2001			
456	Hywel Francis	Lab	Aberavon	7 June 2001			
457	Vera Baird	Lab	Redcar	7 June 2001	13 Feb 1950		
458	Parmjit Dhanda	Lab	Gloucester	7 June 2001	17 Sep 1971		
459	Mike Weir	SNP	Angus	7 June 2001			
460	John MacDougall	Lab	Glenrothes	7 June 2001	8 Dec 1947	13 Aug 2008	
461	Dai Havard	Lab	Merthyr Tydfil and Rhymney	7 June 2001			
462	Siôn Simon	Lab	Birmingham Erdington	7 June 2001	23 Dec 1968		
463	Greg Barker	C	Bexhill and Battle	7 June 2001			
464	John Baron	C	Billericay	7 June 2001			
465	Mark Prisk	C	Hertford and Stortford	7 June 2001			
466	Boris Johnson	C	Henley	7 June 2001	19 Jun 1964		
467	Mark Francois	C	Rayleigh	7 June 2001			
468	Andrew Selous	C	South West Bedfordshire	7 June 2001			
469	Hugo Swire	C	East Devon	7 June 2001			
470	Khalid Mahmood	Lab	Birmingham Perry Barr	7 June 2001			
471	Paul Goodman	C	Wycombe	7 June 2001	17 Nov 1959		
472	Mark Simmonds	C	Boston and Skegness	7 June 2001			
473	Mark Field	C	Cities of London and Westminster	7 June 2001			
474	Henry Bellingham	C	North West Norfolk	7 June 2001			Previously served 1983–97
475	Derek Conway	C	Old Bexley and Sidcup	7 June 2001	15 Feb 1953		Previously served 1983–97
476	Jim Sheridan	Lab	Paisley and Renfrewshire North	7 June 2001	24 Nov 1952	23 Sep 2022	
477	Paul Farrelly	Lab	Newcastle-under-Lyme	7 June 2001			
478	(Dame) Angela Watkinson	C	Upminster	7 June 2001			
479	Jonathan Djanogly	C	Huntingdon	7 June 2001			
480	Patrick Mercer	C	Newark	7 June 2001			
481	Andrew Murrison	C	Westbury	7 June 2001			
482	Ian Liddell-Grainger	C	Bridgwater	7 June 2001			
483	Charles Hendry	C	Wealden	7 June 2001			Previously served 1992–97
484	George Osborne	C	Tatton	7 June 2001			
485	Tom Harris	Lab	Glasgow South	7 June 2001			
486	Ian Lucas	Lab	Wrexham	7 June 2001			
487	Jim Knight	Lab	South Dorset	7 June 2001	6 Mar 1965		
488	David Heyes	Lab	Ashton-under-Lyne	7 June 2001			
489	David Laws	LD	Yeovil	7 June 2001			
490	John Pugh	LD	Southport	7 June 2001			
491	Annette Brooke	LD	Mid Dorset and North Poole	7 June 2001			
492	Patsy Calton	LD	Cheadle	7 June 2001	19 Sep 1948	2 May 2005	
493	Sylvia, Lady Hermon	Ind	North Down	7 June 2001			
494	Mark Hoban	C	Fareham	7 June 2001			
495	Mark Tami	Lab	Alyn and Deeside	7 June 2001			
496	Norman Lamb	LD	North Norfolk	7 June 2001			
497	Hywel Williams	PC	Caernarfon	7 June 2001			
498	Adam Price	PC	Carmarthen East and Dinefwr	7 June 2001	23 Sep 1968		
499	Alistair Burt	C	North East Bedfordshire	7 June 2001			Previously served 1983–97
500	Albert Owen	Lab	Ynys Môn	7 June 2001			
501	Angus Robertson	SNP	Moray	7 June 2001			Parliamentary group leader, SNP (2007–17)
502	Rob Marris	Lab	Wolverhampton South West	7 June 2001	18 Apr 1955		
503	David Cairns	Lab	Inverclyde	7 June 2001		9 May 2011	
504	Paul Holmes	LD	Chesterfield	7 June 2001	16 Jan 1957		
505	Richard Younger-Ross	LD	Teignbridge	7 June 2001	29 Jan 1953		
506	(Sir) Tony Cunningham	Lab	Workington	7 June 2001			
507	Andrew Turner	C	Isle of Wight	7 June 2001			
508	Hugh Robertson	C	Faversham and Mid Kent	7 June 2001			
509	Richard Taylor	Ind	Wyre Forest	7 June 2001	7 Jul 1934	26 Jun 2024	
510	Roger Williams	LD	Brecon and Radnorshire	7 June 2001			
511	Chris Bryant	Lab	Rhondda	7 June 2001			
512	Pete Wishart	SNP	Perth and North Perthshire	7 June 2001			
513	Andrew Mitchell	C	Sutton Coldfield	7 June 2001			Previously served 1987–97.
514	Bob Spink	C	Castle Point	7 June 2001	1 Aug 1948		Previously served 1992–97.
515	Chris Mole	Lab	Ipswich	22 November 2001	16 Mar 1958		
516	Huw Irranca-Davies	Lab	Ogmore	14 February 2002			
517	Sarah Teather	LD	Brent East	18 September 2003			
518	Liam Byrne	Lab	Birmingham Hodge Hill	15 July 2004			
519	Iain Wright	Lab	Hartlepool	30 September 2004			
54th Parliament (elected: 5 May 2005, first met: 11 May 2005, dissolved: 12 April 2010)
520	Sir Malcolm Rifkind	C	Kensington and Chelsea	5 May 2005			Previously served 1974–97
521	William McCrea	DUP	South Antrim	5 May 2005			Previously served 1983-97 and 2000–01
522	Mark Williams	LD	Ceredigion	5 May 2005			
523	David Simpson	DUP	Upper Bann	5 May 2005			
524	Martin Horwood	LD	Cheltenham	5 May 2005			
525	Charles Walker	C	Broxbourne	5 May 2005			
526	Dave Anderson	Lab	Blaydon	5 May 2005			
527	Siân James	Lab	Swansea East	5 May 2005			
528	Tobias Ellwood	C	Bournemouth East	5 May 2005			
529	Adam Afriyie	C	Windsor	5 May 2005			
530	Jeremy Browne	LD	Taunton	5 May 2005			
531	Dan Rogerson	LD	North Cornwall	5 May 2005			
532	Nick Clegg	LD	Sheffield Hallam	5 May 2005			Leader, LD (2007–15)
533	Tim Farron	LD	Westmorland and Lonsdale	5 May 2005			
534	Anne Milton	C	Guildford	5 May 2005			
535	Anne Main	C	St Albans	5 May 2005			
536	Katy Clark	Lab	North Ayrshire and Arran	5 May 2005			
537	David Evennett	C	Bexleyheath and Crayford	5 May 2005			
538	Danny Alexander	LD	Inverness, Nairn, Badenoch and Strathspey	5 May 2005			
539	Lee Scott	C	Ilford North	5 May 2005			
540	Stephen Williams	LD	Bristol West	5 May 2005			
541	Julia Goldsworthy	LD	Falmouth and Camborne	5 May 2005	10 Sep 1978		
542	Alison Seabeck	Lab	Plymouth Devonport	5 May 2005			
543	Stewart Hosie	SNP	Dundee East	5 May 2005			
544	Grant Shapps	C	Welwyn Hatfield	5 May 2005			
545	Mike Penning	C	Hemel Hempstead	5 May 2005			
546	Nick Hurd	C	Ruislip-Northwood	5 May 2005			
547	Kitty Ussher	Lab	Burnley	5 May 2005	18 Mar 1971		
548	Lynda Waltho	Lab	Stourbridge	5 May 2005	22 May 1960		
549	Daniel Kawczynski	C	Shrewsbury and Atcham	5 May 2005			
550	Justine Greening	C	Putney	5 May 2005			
551	Jeremy Wright	C	Rugby and Kenilworth	5 May 2005			
552	Brian Binley	C	Northampton South	5 May 2005			
553	James Duddridge	C	Rochford and Southend East	5 May 2005			
554	James Brokenshire	C	Hornchurch	5 May 2005			
555	Philip Hollobone	C	Kettering	5 May 2005			
556	Theresa Villiers	C	Chipping Barnet	5 May 2005			
557	Rob Wilson	C	Reading East	5 May 2005			
558	Peter Bone	C	Wellingborough	5 May 2005			
559	David Gauke	C	South West Hertfordshire	5 May 2005			
560	Nick Herbert	C	Arundel and South Downs	5 May 2005			
561	David Howarth	LD	Cambridge	5 May 2005	10 Nov 1958		
562	Mark Harper	C	Forest of Dean	5 May 2005			
563	David Mundell	C	Dumfriesshire, Clydesdale and Tweeddale	5 May 2005			
564	Chris Huhne	LD	Eastleigh	5 May 2005			
565	Christopher Fraser	C	South West Norfolk	5 May 2005	24 Oct 1962		Previously served 1997–2001
566	Madeleine Moon	Lab	Bridgend	5 May 2005			
567	John Penrose	C	Weston-Super-Mare	5 May 2005			
568	Mark Pritchard	C	The Wrekin	5 May 2005			
569	Maria Miller	C	Basingstoke	5 May 2005			
570	Shailesh Vara	C	North West Cambridgeshire	5 May 2005			
571	Richard Benyon	C	Newbury	5 May 2005			
572	Douglas Carswell	C	Harwich	5 May 2005			
573	Mark Lancaster	C	North East Milton Keynes	5 May 2005			
574	Greg Hands	C	Hammersmith and Fulham	5 May 2005			
575	Sadiq Khan	Lab	Tooting	5 May 2005			
576	Jenny Willott	LD	Cardiff Central	5 May 2005			
577	Ed Balls	Lab	Normanton	5 May 2005			
578	Ben Wallace	C	Lancaster and Wyre	5 May 2005			
579	Jeremy Hunt	C	South West Surrey	5 May 2005			
580	Lorely Burt	LD	Solihull	5 May 2005			
581	David Davies	C	Monmouth	5 May 2005			
582	David Jones	C	Clwyd West	5 May 2005			
583	Paul Rowen	LD	Rochdale	5 May 2005	11 May 1955		
584	Lyn Brown	Lab	West Ham	5 May 2005			
585	Philip Davies	C	Shipley	5 May 2005			
586	Stephen Hammond	C	Wimbledon	5 May 2005			
587	Jo Swinson	LD	East Dunbartonshire	5 May 2005			
588	Sir Peter Soulsby	Lab	Leicester South	5 May 2005			
589	Ed Vaizey	C	Wantage	5 May 2005			
590	Andrew Gwynne	Lab	Denton and Reddish	5 May 2005			
591	Stewart Jackson	C	Peterborough	5 May 2005			
592	Stephen Crabb	C	Preseli Pembrokeshire	5 May 2005			
593	Anne Snelgrove	Lab	Swindon South	5 May 2005	7 Aug 1957		
594	Brooks Newmark	C	Braintree	5 May 2005			
595	Greg Mulholland	LD	Leeds North West	5 May 2005			
596	Mary Creagh	Lab	Wakefield	5 May 2005			
597	Mark Durkan	SDLP	Foyle	5 May 2005			
598	Alasdair McDonnell	SDLP	Belfast South	5 May 2005			
599	Susan Kramer	LD	Richmond Park	5 May 2005	21 Jul 1950		
600	Sarah McCarthy-Fry	Lab	Portsmouth North	5 May 2005	4 Feb 1955		
601	Helen Goodman	Lab	Bishop Auckland	5 May 2005			
602	Pat McFadden	Lab	Wolverhampton South East	5 May 2005			
603	Meg Hillier	Lab	Hackney South and Shoreditch	5 May 2005			
604	Linda Riordan	Lab	Halifax	5 May 2005			
605	Lynne Featherstone	LD	Hornsey and Wood Green	5 May 2005			
606	Sammy Wilson	DUP	East Antrim	5 May 2005			
607	Robert Goodwill	C	Scarborough and Whitby	5 May 2005			
608	Peter Law	Ind	Blaenau Gwent	5 May 2005	1 Apr 1948	25 Apr 2006	
609	Adam Holloway	C	Gravesham	5 May 2005			
610	Natascha Engel	Lab	North East Derbyshire	5 May 2005			
611	Roberta Blackman-Woods	Lab	City of Durham	5 May 2005			
612	Gordon Banks	Lab	Ochil and South Perthshire	5 May 2005			
613	Rob Flello	Lab	Stoke-on-Trent South	5 May 2005			
614	Greg Clark	C	Tunbridge Wells	5 May 2005			
615	Michael Gove	C	Surrey Heath	5 May 2005			
616	Angela Smith	Lab	Sheffield Hillsborough	5 May 2005			
617	Celia Barlow	Lab	Hove	5 May 2005	28 Sep 1955		
618	Kerry McCarthy	Lab	Bristol East	5 May 2005			
619	Jessica Morden	Lab	Newport East	5 May 2005			
620	Diana Johnson	Lab	Kingston upon Hull North	5 May 2005			
621	Graham Stuart	C	Beverley and Holderness	5 May 2005			
622	Nadine Dorries	C	Mid Bedfordshire	5 May 2005			
623	John Leech	LD	Manchester Withington	5 May 2005			
624	David Burrowes	C	Enfield Southgate	5 May 2005			
625	Dawn Butler	Lab	Brent South	5 May 2005	3 Nov 1969		
626	Emily Thornberry	Lab	Islington South and Finsbury	5 May 2005			
627	Barbara Keeley	Lab	Worsley	5 May 2005			
628	Sharon Hodgson	Lab	Washington and Sunderland West	5 May 2005			
629	Geoffrey Cox	C	Torridge and West Devon	5 May 2005			
630	Andy Slaughter	Lab	Ealing, Acton and Shepherd's Bush	5 May 2005			
631	John Hemming	LD	Birmingham Yardley	5 May 2005			
632	Jim McGovern	Lab	Dundee West	5 May 2005			
633	Ed Miliband	Lab	Doncaster North	5 May 2005			
634	Jamie Reed	Lab	Copeland	5 May 2005			
635	Andrew Pelling	C	Croydon Central	5 May 2005	20 Aug 1959		Elected for the Conservative Party, left in 2007
636	Ian Austin	Lab	Dudley North	5 May 2005	6 Mar 1965		
637	Shahid Malik	Lab	Dewsbury	5 May 2005	24 Nov 1967		
638	Philip Dunne	C	Ludlow	5 May 2005	14 Aug 1958		
639	Angus MacNeil	SNP	Na h-Eileanan an Iar	5 May 2005	21 Jul 1970		
640	Rosie Cooper	Lab	West Lancashire	5 May 2005	5 Sep 1950		
641	Nia Griffith	Lab	Llanelli	5 May 2005	4 Dec 1956		
642	Mark Hunter	LD	Cheadle	14 July 2005	25 Jul 1957		
643	Jim Devine	Lab	Livingston	29 September 2005	21 May 1953		
644	Willie Rennie	LD	Dunfermline and West Fife	9 February 2006	2 Sep 1967		
645	Bob Neill	C	Bromley and Chislehurst	29 June 2006	24 Jun 1952		
646	Dai Davies	BGPV	Blaenau Gwent	29 June 2006	26 Nov 1959		
647	Virendra Sharma	Lab	Ealing Southall	19 July 2007	15 Apr 1947		
648	Phil Wilson	Lab	Sedgefield	19 July 2007	31 May 1959		
649	Edward Timpson	C	Crewe and Nantwich	22 May 2008	26 Dec 1973		
650	John Howell	C	Henley	26 June 2008	27 Jul 1955		
651	John Mason	SNP	Glasgow East	24 July 2008	15 May 1957		
652	Lindsay Roy	Lab	Glenrothes	6 November 2008	19 Jan 1949		
653	Chloe Smith	C	Norwich North	23 July 2009	17 May 1982		
654	Willie Bain	Lab	Glasgow North East	12 November 2009	29 Nov 1972		
Members who have never been sworn in
–	Gerry Adams	SF	Belfast West	1 May 1997	6 Oct 1948		Previously served 1983–92.
–	Martin McGuinness	SF	Mid Ulster	1 May 1997	23 May 1950	21 Mar 2017	
–	Pat Doherty	SF	West Tyrone	7 June 2001	18 Jul 1945		
–	Michelle Gildernew	SF	Fermanagh and South Tyrone	7 June 2001	28 Mar 1970		
–	Conor Murphy	SF	Newry and Armagh	5 May 2005	10 Jul 1963		

== See also ==
- List of MPs elected in the 2005 United Kingdom general election
