= Steve Baker (politician) =

British politician (born 1971)

The Right Honourable Steve Baker FRSA
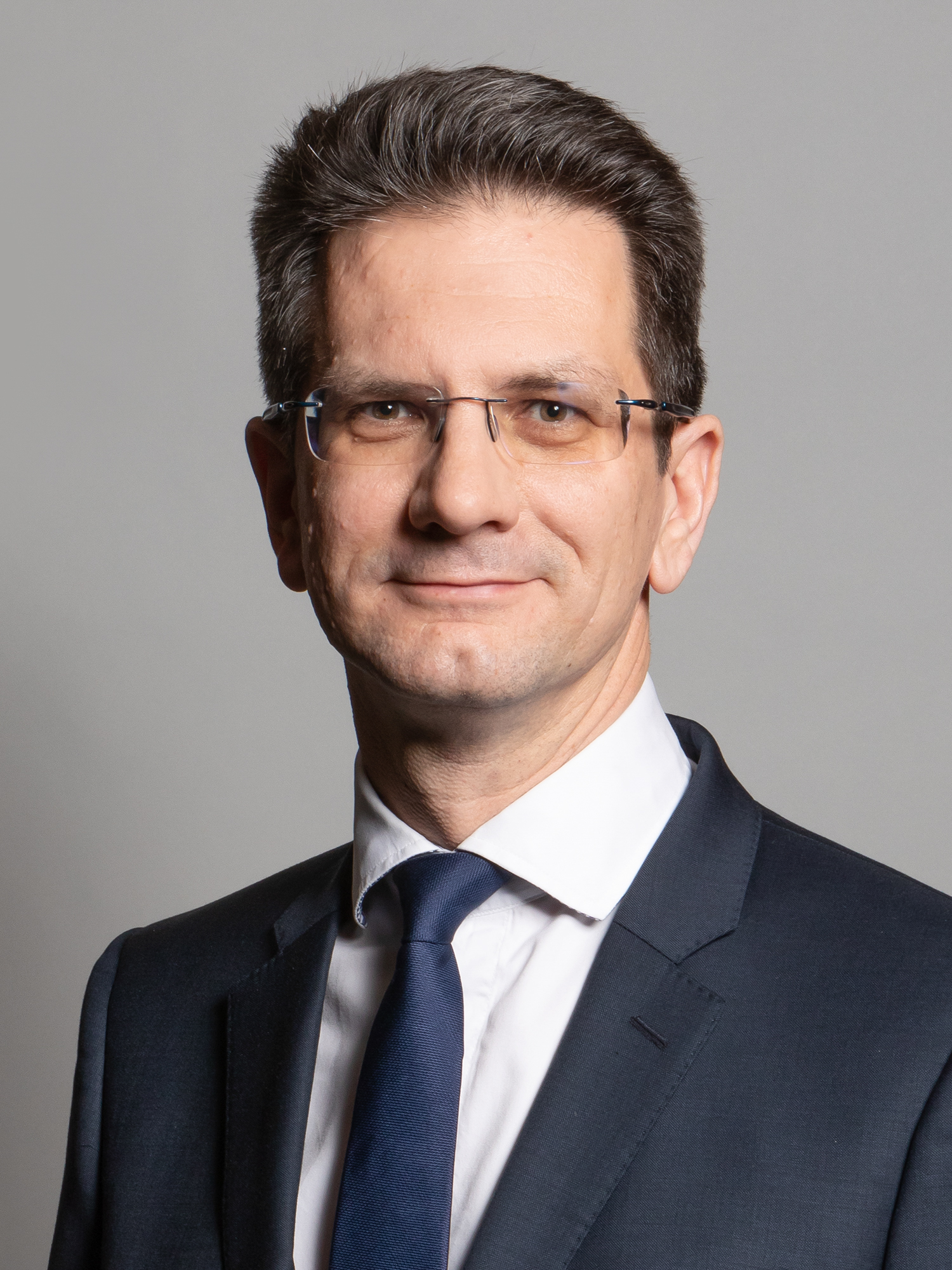
- Official portrait, 2020

Minister of State in the Cabinet Office
- In office 7 February 2024 – 5 July 2024
- Prime Minister: Rishi Sunak
- Preceded by: Office established
- Succeeded by: Office abolished

Minister of State for Northern Ireland
- In office 7 September 2022 – 5 July 2024
- Prime Minister: Liz Truss; Rishi Sunak
- Preceded by: Conor Burns
- Succeeded by: Hilary Benn

Parliamentary Under-Secretary of State for Exiting the European Union
- In office 13 June 2017 – 9 July 2018
- Prime Minister: Theresa May
- Preceded by: The Lord Bridges of Headley
- Succeeded by: Chris Heaton-Harris

Member of Parliament for Wycombe
- In office 6 May 2010 – 30 May 2024
- Preceded by: Paul Goodman
- Succeeded by: Emma Reynolds

Chair of the European Research Group
- In office 2016–2017
- Preceded by: Chris Heaton-Harris
- Succeeded by: Suella Braverman
- In office 2019–2020
- Preceded by: Jacob Rees-Mogg
- Succeeded by: Mark Francois

Personal details
- Born: Steven John Baker; 6 June 1971 (age 55) St Austell, Cornwall, England
- Party: Conservative
- Education: University of Southampton (BEng); St Cross College, Oxford (MSc)
- Website: Official website Commons website
- Military career
- Allegiance: United Kingdom
- Branch: Royal Air Force
- Service years: 1989–1999
- Rank: Flight lieutenant
- Service number: 5206370Q

Steven John Baker (born 6 June 1971) is a British former politician who served as Minister of State for Northern Ireland from 2022 to 2024 and as Minister of State in the Cabinet Office from February to July 2024, having previously served as Parliamentary Under-Secretary of State for Exiting the European Union from 2017 to 2018. A member of the Conservative Party, he was the Member of Parliament (MP) for Wycombe in Buckinghamshire from 2010 to 2024. Baker was chair of the pro-Brexit European Research Group (ERG) from 2016 to 2017 and from 2019 to 2020.

Born in St Austell, Baker attended Poltair School. He went on to study at the University of Southampton and at St Cross College, Oxford. He joined the Royal Air Force as an engineer in 1989 and served until his retirement in 1999. He later worked as a consulting software engineer and manager between 1999 and 2010. He was selected as the Conservative party candidate for Wycombe in October 2009 and was elected for the constituency in the 2010 general election. As a backbencher, Baker was an executive member of the 1922 committee from 2012 to 2017. He was reelected in 2015 general election, and became Chair of the ERG in 2016.

After the 2017 general election in which Baker was reelected, he was appointed Parliamentary Under-Secretary of State for Exiting the European Union under Prime Minister Theresa May. He resigned in 2018 over disagreements with May's Brexit strategy. After his return to the backbenches, Baker became Deputy Chair of the ERG in 2018. He was reelected in the 2019 general election, and later again became the Chair of the ERG in the same year before his resignation from the position in 2020.

After the resignation of Boris Johnson, Baker considered a possible bid for the leadership in the July–September 2022 Conservative Party leadership election, but chose not to stand and endorsed Suella Braverman. He later endorsed Liz Truss's successful campaign in the election, and after Truss became Prime Minister in September 2022, Baker returned to the government as Minister of State for Northern Ireland in Truss's government. After Truss's resignation the following month, Baker endorsed Rishi Sunak in the October 2022 Conservative Party leadership election and was subsequently reappointed to his position in the Sunak ministry. He was sworn into the Privy Council in November 2023, and gained the additional office of Minister of State in the Cabinet Office in February 2024. After serving in parliament for 14 years, Baker was defeated at the 2024 general election; losing his seat to the Labour Party.

== Early life and career ==
Baker was born on 6 June 1971 in St Austell, one of two children. He was educated at Poltair School in St Austell and St Austell Sixth Form College followed by the University of Southampton where he gained a BEng in Aerospace Engineering. He later studied at St Cross College, Oxford, where he earned an MSc in Computation.

On 3 September 1989, Baker joined the Royal Air Force as an engineer and became an Engineering Officer, with the rank of pilot officer, on 15 July 1992. He was promoted to flying officer in 1993 and flight lieutenant in 1996. Baker retired from the RAF on 1 August 1999, with rank of flight lieutenant, at his own request. He later worked as a consulting software engineer and manager. He was head of client services with DecisionSoft Ltd (now named CoreFiling) in Oxford from 2000 to 2001.

Baker has worked as a Unix system administrator. He was appointed as Chief Technical Officer at BASDA Ltd, Great Missenden in 2002, a position he held until 2007. For a year from 2005 he was director of product development at CoreFiling Ltd. He was the chief architect of global financing and asset service platforms at Lehman Brothers from 2006 to 2008. He has been principal of Ambriel Consulting Ltd since 2001.

== Parliamentary career (2010–2024) ==
=== Early backbench career ===
Baker was selected as the Conservative candidate for Wycombe on 31 October 2009, after former Conservative MP Paul Goodman stood down. He was elected and held the seat for the Conservative Party, winning 48.6% of the vote and a majority of 9,560.

Baker was rated as one of the Conservatives' top 10 most rebellious MPs of the 2010 intake. He was nominated as a 'Newcomer of the Year' on ConservativeHome. He was named as the most authoritative Member of Parliament on Twitter in January 2011. In March 2011, Baker initiated an adjournment debate alleging a malicious prosecution of an operator of an independent mental health unit. The Solicitor General Edward Garnier issued an apology. That year, Baker attracted controversy after he was one of three Conservative MPs who went on a luxury trip to Equatorial Guinea, funded by the Government of the state, via a trust based in Malta. They reported at the end of the trip that human rights violations in the country were "trivial", in contrast to Amnesty International, which had reported repeated incidents of torture in the country.

Baker campaigned for banking reform, calling for banks to re-adopt Generally Accepted Accounting Practice to account for devalued loans, as well as failed ones; in May 2011, he calculated that the use of IFRS instead of GAAP over-stated the strength of Royal Bank of Scotland's balance sheet by £25bn. He introduced a Ten Minute Rule bill to 'bring casino banking into the light', by changing rules by which banks account for derivatives.

He was elected to the executive of the 1922 Committee on 16 May 2012, saying he was 'fed up with factionalism' and wanted 'to stand as neither a modernising 301 candidate or a traditionalist'.

At the 2015 general election, Baker was re-elected, increasing his share of the vote to 51.4% and increasing his majority to 14,856.

In June 2015 he became co-chair of Conservatives for Britain, a campaigning organisation formed of Eurosceptic MPs.

Baker was shortlisted for the Grassroot Diplomat Initiative Award in 2015 for the founding of the Cobden Centre, and remains in the directory of the Grassroot Diplomat Who's Who publication. In 2017, the Unite Union raised concerns that Baker had lobbied for the deregulation of white asbestos. In 2010, in a series of parliamentary questions, Baker asked the Work and Pensions Secretary: "If he will bring forward proposals to distinguish the white form of asbestos and the blue and brown forms of that substance", also questioning: "If he will commission an inquiry into the appropriateness of the health and safety precautions in force in respect of asbestos cement."

Baker became chair of the ERG, a pro-Brexit group of Conservative MPs, on 20 November 2016.

At the snap 2017 general election, Baker was again re-elected, seeing his share of the vote decrease to 50% and his majority decrease to 6,578.

=== Ministerial career (2017–2018) ===
In February 2018, as a minister in the Department for Exiting the European Union, Baker was forced to apologise after inaccurately claiming that civil servants had deliberately produced negative economic models to influence policy. Answering questions in the House of Commons, Baker confirmed a claim by the Eurosceptic backbencher Jacob Rees-Mogg that Charles Grant, the Director of the Centre for European Reform, had reported that Treasury officials "had deliberately developed a model to show that all options other than staying in the customs union were bad, and that officials intended to use this to influence policy". Audio then emerged of the event in question, which showed that Grant had not made the comments attributed to him. By the time the audio was released by Prospect magazine, the Prime Minister's spokesman had already backed Baker's claims. The spokesman later said that Baker had made a "genuine mistake".

On 8 July 2018, Baker resigned following the resignation of the Brexit Secretary, David Davis after working on a Brexit white paper which Baker said "did not accord with what was put to the cabinet" a few days earlier. He was appointed Deputy Chair of the ERG shortly after and de facto chief whip.

=== Return to the backbenches (2018–2022) ===
On 22 October 2018, Baker submitted a letter of no confidence in Theresa May's leadership over her Brexit Withdrawal Agreement proposals, stating that he had become convinced it was not possible to "separate the person from the policy." A few days earlier, Baker had told fellow members of the European Research Group that by his count they likely already had the 48 letters necessary to trigger a motion of no confidence in Theresa May's leadership, and told BBC Politics they were "pretty close" to getting them "with a dozen more probables on top".

At the 2019 general election Baker was again re-elected with a decreased vote share of 45.2% and a decreased majority of 4,214. He again became Chair of the ERG before resigning in 2020.

In May 2020 he called for Dominic Cummings's resignation. He is a steering committee member of the COVID Recovery Group, a group of Conservative MPs who opposed the UK government's December 2020 lockdown. The Telegraph described them as being seen by Westminster as an "echo" of the Brexiteer ERG, and a response by backbench Conservatives to Nigel Farage's anti-lockdown Reform UK party.

In late 2021, Baker announced the campaign group Conservative Way Forward will be relaunched in 2022, with him as its new chairman.

In April 2022, in the wake of the Partygate scandal surrounding British Prime Minister Boris Johnson, Baker stated in the House of Commons that "the gig is up" and that Johnson should be "long gone by now". He said this two days after he had praised the prime minister's new apology given that week for his actions during the period of behaviour restrictions imposed over the COVID pandemic. Following the resignation of Johnson in July, Baker considered a possible candidacy to succeed him, but ultimately chose not to stand and endorsed Suella Braverman. He later endorsed Liz Truss's successful bid for the leadership.

=== Return to government (2022–2024) ===
On 7 September 2022, he was appointed Minister of State in the Northern Ireland Office under Prime Minister Liz Truss in her ministry. The appointment came at a sensitive time with the government facing challenges over the Northern Ireland Protocol. Baker endorsed Rishi Sunak in the October 2022 Conservative Party leadership election and was subsequently reappointed as Minister of State for Northern Ireland. He was appointed Minister of State for the Cabinet Office in February 2024, with the responsibility for carrying through the implementation of the Windsor Framework.

After serving as an MP for 14 years, Baker was defeated in the 2024 general election for Wycombe, losing to Labour candidate Emma Reynolds, who beat Baker with a majority of 4,591.

== Post-parliamentary career ==
Baker endorsed Tom Tugendhat in the 2024 Conservative Party leadership election.

=== Ireland ===
In 2024 Baker commented on how the British Government treated Ireland during the Brexit process, "I am embarrassed that Ireland was treated the way it was by the United Kingdom. It was wrong. God knows over our history Ireland has been treated badly by the UK". Speaking to journalists he noted “I was really sincere in that apology. But Brexiteers were having a go at me because I was apologising for something that Leo Varadkar had also been party to making worse.”

== Political positions ==
Some commentators, such as Ian Birrell of The Guardian, regard Baker as being on the right wing of the Conservative Party. The Associated Press has described him as a libertarian. He describes his political inspiration as being the Liberal Richard Cobden, founding the Cobden Centre under the motto: 'Peace will come to earth when the people have more to do with each other and governments less'. He identifies as a born again Christian.

=== Climate change ===
Baker has expressed scepticism about the exact scope of human influence on climate change, stating in 2010 that the science appears to be subject to uncertainties and that bad economics are a greater threat to civilisation than climate change. In 2022, he shared a paper on social media which denied climate change. He was a trustee of the Global Warming Policy Foundation from May 2021 to September 2022, an organisation which has historically breached Charity Commission rules on impartiality in its climate change coverage. At an event hosted in parliament in July 2022, by the GWPF, Baker accused climate campaigners of "terrifying children" and said he regarded their warnings as "child abuse."

DeSmog, the climate science fact checking website, has documented the extensive ties between the GWPF and Baker's Net Zero Scrutiny Group of MPs opposed to the UK's climate goals.

Baker has said he would end incentives for wind and solar power because "they are fundamentally intermittent sources of energy", and instead would encourage domestic production of natural gas. He said many green measures including farmers' support payments were "anti-human life on Earth in the name of environmentalism", and would encourage maximising food production.

Baker voted against the party whip to oppose the construction of the High Speed 2 rail line in 2010, although the line did not pass through his own constituency, arguing that the whole plan should be scrapped.

=== Brexit ===
Baker campaigned for Brexit before and during the 2016 referendum. He says he originally joined the Conservative Party with the express intention of campaigning for the UK to leave the EU. He chaired Conservatives for Britain, a predecessor group to the official Vote Leave campaign and the Eurosceptic European Research Group until becoming a minister. He was described by the New Statesman as someone who had been "the most doctrinaire Leaver inside government and one of the few sincere advocates for a no-deal exit on the government payroll" before resigning. Back in 2010, he stated at a meeting of the Libertarian Alliance that he thought "the European Union needs to be wholly torn down", considering it "an obstacle to ... free trade and peace among all the nations of Europe as well as the world". Baker argues Brexit presents an opportunity for more free trade outside the EU but also favours protectionism against China. During an interview with Sky News after a debate on Brexit in April 2019, Baker referred to himself as "the hard man of Brexit".

=== Economics ===
Baker has advocated a return to the gold standard and identifies with the Austrian School of Economics. He opposed quantitative easing policies in 2011, arguing they would create a worse crisis.

=== Same-sex marriage ===
Baker voted in opposition to the Marriage (Same Sex Couples) Act 2013, and called for the government to "get out of marriage". He argued that the current situation risks infringing both the freedoms of the religious and LGBT communities, and that private individuals should define the term marriage, rather than the state.

=== Parliament ===
Regarding parliamentary procedures, Baker wants to reform early day motions (EDMs), possibly replacing them with "Members' Motions" on the grounds that EDMs 'are used to publicise the views of individual MPs', whereas a system such as 'Members' Motions' could be 'debated by the House'.

In February 2021, Baker proposed to reform the Public Health Act legislation to "prevent ministers [from] imposing job-destroying restrictions without warning or scrutiny" in light of the COVID-19 pandemic in the United Kingdom, to ensure that economists have a share of seats on the advisory board where "decisions on social restrictions are made", and drew inspiration for his proposed monthly sunset clauses from the Civil Contingencies Act.

He was sworn in as a Privy Counsellor in November 2023, entitling him to the style The Right Honourable for life.

== Personal life ==
Steve Baker is married to Beth (Julia Elizabeth), a former RAF officer in the medical branch whom he met on his first tour which was at RAF Leeming. He is a committed evangelical Christian and attends a local Baptist church. He lists skydiving and advanced motorcycling as his hobbies. An advanced driver, he has successfully passed the High Performance Course. ‌He is a Fellow of the Royal Society of Arts. He is a founding member of The Cobden Centre, an educational charity promoting Austrian economics.

Parliament of the United Kingdom
Preceded by Paul Goodman	Member of Parliament for Wycombe; 2010–2024	Succeeded by Emma Reynolds
Other offices
Preceded by Chris Heaton-Harris	Chair of the European Research Group; 2016–2017	Succeeded by Suella Fernandes
Preceded by Jacob Rees-Mogg	Chair of the European Research Group; 2019–2020	Succeeded by Mark Francois
Preceded by Conor Burns	Minister of State for Northern Ireland; 2022-2024	Succeeded by Hilary Benn
