= CoreFiling =

Software company in United Kingdom

CoreFiling Ltd.
- Type: Privately held limited company
- Industry: Software, Information technology consulting, regulatory compliance, XBRL
- Founded: July 1997
- Founder: Philip Allen, and others
- Headquarters: Oxford, United Kingdom
- Products: Seahorse, SpiderMonkey, Magnify, True North, Yeti, Sphinx, Decimate
- Services: Information governance, I.T. and accountancy consulting
- Number of employees: 51-200
- Website: www.corefiling.com

CoreFiling Limited (trading as DecisionSoft Limited until 2009) is a private limited software house based in Oxford, UK. Its product-range enables creation, validation, search, and the filing and auditing of XBRL/iXBRL documents. Its products are used by financial regulators and financial institutions. Its products are sold directly and through resellers including BDO International, Unit4, and IRIS Software. It is a member of the XBRL Consortium.

== iXBRL ==
Philip Allen of CoreFiling invented the inline XBRL markup standard that is now required by regulators such as HMRC.

== Open source ==
CoreFiling maintain a number of open-source BSD licensed XML tools including a pretty-printer, differ, and schema validator.
