= Frontbench team of Menzies Campbell =

Liberal Democrats Frontbench Team/Shadow Cabinet led by Menzies Campbell

- 2006–2007
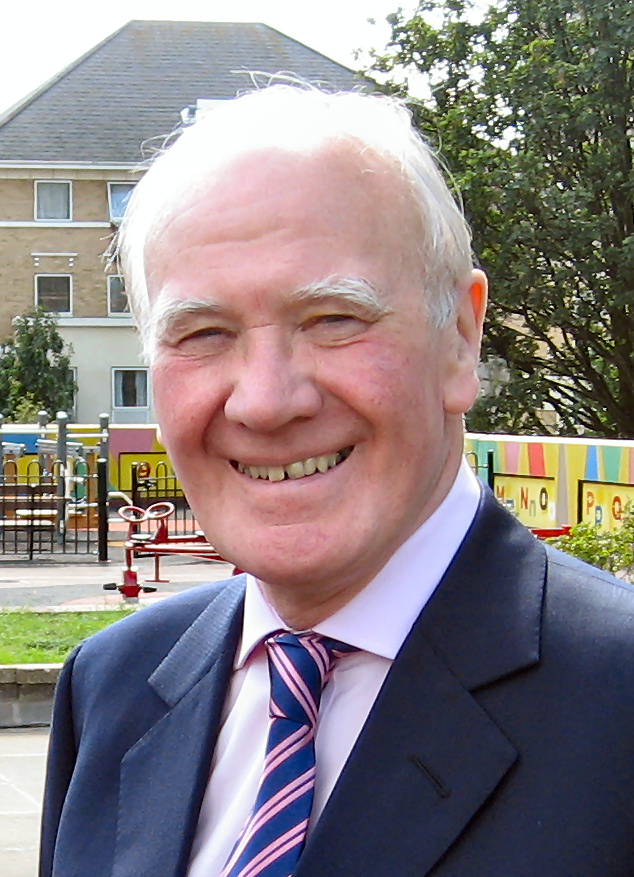
- Date formed: 2 March 2006
- Date dissolved: 15 October 2007

People and organisations
- Monarch: Elizabeth II
- Leader: Menzies Campbell
- Deputy Leader: Vince Cable
- Member party: Liberal Democrats
- Status in legislature: Third party 52 / 651 (8%) Opposition

History
- Incoming formation: 2006 Liberal Democrats leadership election
- Outgoing formation: Resignation of Menzies Campbell
- Predecessor: Frontbench Team of Charles Kennedy
- Successor: First Frontbench Team of Vince Cable

Frontbench Teams since 1997
Ashdown Team (1997–1999)
Kennedy Team (1999–2006)
Campbell Team (2006–2007)
First Cable Team (2007)
Clegg Team (2007–2010)
General Election Cabinet (2015)
Farron Team (2015–2017)
Second Cable Team (2017–2019)
Swinson Team (2019)
Davey Team (2020–present)

The list that follows is the Liberal Democrats Frontbench Team/Shadow Cabinet led by Menzies Campbell from 2006 to 2007.

== Shadow Cabinet ==
=== Initial team ===
Portfolio	Holder
Leader of the Liberal Democrats	Sir Menzies Campbell MP
Deputy Leader of the Liberal Democrats; Shadow Chancellor	Vincent Cable MP
Shadow Chief Secretary to the Treasury	Julia Goldsworthy MP
Foreign Affairs	Michael Moore MP
Home Affairs	Nick Clegg MP
Health	Norman Lamb MP
Defence	Nick Harvey MP
Environment, Food and Rural Affairs	Chris Huhne MP
Transport	Alistair Carmichael MP
Constitutional Affairs; Shadow Attorney General; Party President	Simon Hughes MP
Leader of the House of Commons; Cabinet Office	David Heath MP
Work and Pensions	David Laws MP
Education	Sarah Teather MP
Culture, Media and Sport	Don Foster MP
Communities and Local Government	Andrew Stunell MP
Trade and Industry	Ed Davey MP
International Development	Susan Kramer MP
Scotland	Jo Swinson MP
Northern Ireland and Wales	Lembit Öpik MP
Party Leader's Chief of Staff	Norman Baker MP
Chief Whip	Paul Burstow MP
Chair of the Manifesto Group	Steve Webb MP
Parliamentary Private Secretary to the Leader	Tim Farron MP
Chair of the Parliamentary Party	Paul Holmes MP
Leader of the Party in the House of Lords	Tom McNally, Baron McNally
Shadow Solicitor General	David Howarth MP

=== 2007 Reshuffle ===
Portfolio	Holder
Leader of the Liberal Democrats	Menzies Campbell MP
Deputy Leader of the Liberal Democrats; Shadow Chancellor	Vincent Cable MP
Shadow Chief Secretary to the Treasury	Julia Goldsworthy MP
Foreign Affairs	Michael Moore MP
Home Affairs	Nick Clegg MP
Health	Norman Lamb MP
Defence	Nick Harvey MP
Environment, Food and Rural Affairs	Chris Huhne MP
Transport	Susan Kramer MP
Leader of the House of Commons; Party President	Simon Hughes MP
Lord Chancellor; Justice	David Heath MP
Children, Schools and Families	David Laws MP
Innovation, Universities and Skills	Sarah Teather MP
Culture, Media and Sport	Don Foster MP
Communities and Local Government	Andrew Stunell MP
Housing; Chair of the Parliamentary Party	Paul Holmes MP
Work and Pensions	Danny Alexander MP
Business, Enterprise and Regulatory Reform	Lembit Öpik MP
Cabinet Office; Chancellor of the Duchy of Lancaster	Norman Baker MP
International Development	Lynne Featherstone MP
Northern Ireland and Scotland	Alistair Carmichael MP
Wales	Roger Williams MP
Leader of the Liberal Democrats in the House of Lords	Tom McNally, Baron McNally
Chief Whip in the Commons	Paul Burstow MP
Party Leader's Chief of Staff; Chair of Campaigns and Communications	Edward Davey MP
Chair of the Manifesto Group	Steve Webb MP
Parliamentary Private Secretary to the Leader	Tim Farron MP
Shadow Attorney General	Martin Thomas, Baron Thomas of Gresford
Shadow Solicitor General	David Howarth MP

== Spokespeople by Department ==
Sits in the House of Commons
Sits in the House of Lords
Privy Counsellor
Shadow Cabinet full members **in bold**
Shadow Cabinet attendees **in bold italics**

Whips office
Leader of the House of Commons	**David Heath** (until July 2007)
Leader of the House of Commons	**Simon Hughes** (from July 2007)
Leader of the House of Lords	**Lord McNally**
Chief Whip in the Commons	**Paul Burstow**
Deputy Whips in the Commons	Adrian Sanders
Deputy Whips in the Commons	Jenny Willott
Chief Whip in the Lords	Lord Shutt of Greetland
Deputy Whips in the Lords	Lord Addington
Deputy Whips in the Lords	Baroness Harris of Richmond
Deputy Whips in the Lords	The Earl of Mar & Kellie
Deputy Whips in the Lords	Lord Roberts of Llandudno

Treasury
Shadow Chancellor	**Vincent Cable**
Shadow Chief Secretary to the Treasury	Julia Goldsworthy
Spokesperson	Colin Breed
Spokesperson	Lord Newby
Spokesperson	Lord Oakeshott of Seagrove Bay

Foreign Affairs
**Michael Moore**
Jeremy Browne (until July 2007)
Mark Hunter (from July 2007)
Lord Wallace of Saltaire (Africa)
Lord Avebury (Europe) (until July 2007)
The Lord Dykes (Europe) (from July 2007)

International Development
**Susan Kramer** (until July 2007)
**Lynne Featherstone** (from July 2007)
John Barrett (from July 2007)
Baroness Northover
Lord Roberts of Llandudno

Home Affairs and Legal Affairs
Home Affairs	**Norman Lamb**
Home Affairs	Lynne Featherstone (until July 2007)
Home Affairs	Mark Hunter (until July 2007)
Home Affairs	Jeremy Browne (from July 2007
Home Affairs	Tim Farron (from July 2007)
Home Affairs	Lord Dholakia
Constitutional Affairs/Justice	**Simon Hughes** (until July 2007)
Constitutional Affairs/Justice	**David Heath** (from July 2007)
Shadow Attorney General	Lord Thomas of Gresford
Shadow Solicitor General	David Howarth
Penal Reform	Baroness Linklater of Butterstone
Police	Baroness Harris of Richmond
Civil Liberties	Lord Avebury
Scottish Home Affairs	Earl of Mar and Kellie
ID cards and Charities Bill	Lord Phillips of Sudbury
Shadow Lord Chancellor	Lord Goodhart

Environment, Food and Rural Affairs
Environment, Food and Rural Affairs	**Chris Huhne**
Environment, Food and Rural Affairs	Baroness Miller of Chilthorne Domer
Environment, Food and Rural Affairs	Lord Greaves
Environment	Martin Horwood
Rural Affairs	Roger Williams
Agriculture	Lord Livsey of Talgarth
Energy	Lord Redesdale

Health
**Steve Webb**
Sandra Gidley
John Pugh
Baroness Barker
Baroness Neuberger

Transport
**Alistair Carmichael** (until July 2007)
**Susan Kramer** (from July 2007)
Paul Rowen (until July 2007)
John Leech
Lord Bradshaw
Earl of Mar and Kellie
Earl of Glasgow

Trade and Industry
Trade and Industry	**Edward Davey (until July 2007)**
Trade and Industry	**Lembit Öpik** (from July 2007)
Trade and Industry	Lord Razzall
Trade and Industry	Lord Vallance of Tummel
Trade and Industry	Lord Sharman
Small Business	Lorely Burt
Energy	David Howarth
Energy	Lord Redesdale

Culture, Media and Sport
**Don Foster**
Tom Brake (from July 2007)
Lord Clement-Jones
Baroness Bonham-Carter
Lord Addington (Sport)

Defence
**Nick Harvey**
Bob Russell
Willie Rennie
Lord Garden

Work and Pensions
Work and Pensions	**David Laws** (until July 2007)
Work and Pensions	**Danny Alexander** (from July 2007)
Work and Pensions	Lord Oakeshott of Seagrove Bay
Disability Issues	Danny Alexander (until July 2007)
Disability Issues	Paul Rowen (from July 2007)
Disability Issues	Lord Addington

Communities and Local Government
Communities and Local Government	**Andrew Stunell**
Communities and Local Government	Dan Rogerson (until July 2007)
Communities and Local Government	Jo Swinson (from July 2007)
Communities and Local Government	Tom Brake (from July 2007)
Communities and Local Government	Baroness Scott of Needham Market
Communities and Local Government	Baroness Falkner of Margravine
Regional and Local Government	Baroness Hamwee

Wales
**Lembit Opik** (until July 2007)
**Alistair Carmichael** (until July 2007)
Mark Williams
Lord Livsey of Talgarth
Lord Roberts of Llandudno

Northern Ireland
**Lembit Opik** (until July 2007)
**Alistair Carmichael** (until July 2007)
Alan Reid
Lord Smith of Clifton
Baroness Harris of Richmond

Scotland
**Jo Swinson** (until July 2007)
**Alistair Carmichael** (from July 2007)
John Barrett (until July 2007)
Alan Reid (from July 2007)
Lord Maclennan of Rogart

Education and Skills
Education (Innovation, Universities and Skills)	**Sarah Teather**
Children, Schools and Families	**David Laws**
Further and Higher Education	Stephen Williams
Schools	Greg Mulholland
Education and Children	Baroness Walmsley
Further and Higher Education and Skills	Baroness Sharp of Guildford
Innovation, Universities and Skills	Evan Harris
Children and the Family	Annette Brooke
Young People	Jenny Willott
Science	Evan Harris

Cabinet Office
**David Heath** (until July 2007)
**Norman Baker** (from July 2007)
Lord Maclennan of Rogart
Lord Roberts of Llandudno (Women)
Lorely Burt (Women and Equality) (until July 2007)
Jo Swinson (Women and Equality) (from July 2007)
Tom Brake (London and the Olympics) (from July 2007)
