= Elspeth Campbell =

British socialite and baroness (1940–2023)

The Right Honourable The Lady Campbell of Pittenweem
- Born: Elspeth Mary Urquhart; 5 January 1940; New Delhi, British India
- Died: 5 June 2023 (aged 83); Edinburgh, Scotland
- Education: Open University
- Spouses: Sir Philip Grant-Suttie, Bt (m. 1962; div. 1969); Menzies Campbell (m. 1970)
- Children: 1
- Father: Roy Urquhart

Elspeth Mary Campbell, Lady Campbell of Pittenweem (5 January 1940 – 5 June 2023) was a British baroness and socialite. She was married to the Liberal Democrat politician Menzies Campbell from 1970 until her death.

== Early life and education ==
Elspeth Mary Urquhart was born on 5 January 1940 in New Delhi, British India, one of four children of Major (later Major-General) Roy Urquhart, who was portrayed by Sean Connery in the 1977 film A Bridge Too Far, and his wife Pamela. When she was six months old, she and her mother embarked on a two-month journey to Britain, during which some of the ships in their convoy were torpedoed. She spent the rest of the Second World War with relatives in Exmouth, Devon, cared for by Alice (Adgie) Sweet, carer for the children of British parents in colonial India, and recalled her father's return from the Battle of Arnhem arriving home in his army uniform.

After the war the family moved to Kuala Lumpur, British Malaya, after her father was appointed General Officer Commanding during the Malayan Emergency. This was followed by two years living by the Wörthersee in Austria while her father was General Officer Commanding of the British troops there before she returned to Exmouth and was sent to a convent school there. At school, she earned A levels that would have enabled her admission to Oxford, but her father vetoed the idea and she was instead sent to a finishing school near Aylesbury in Buckinghamshire.

After school, Urquhart worked at the Conservative Party's Central Office in London and later at a venue on Park Lane, London, that hosted parties and dances, where she met her first husband.

== Family and later life ==
On 13 October 1962 Urquhart married her first husband, Sir Philip Grant-Suttie, who had inherited a baronetcy and estate in East Lothian, Scotland. She thereby became Lady Grant-Suttie. They had one son, James, and were divorced in 1969. It was during the divorce that her lawyer, the future Conservative politician Nicholas Fairbairn, introduced her to a fellow lawyer, Menzies Campbell. He proposed within two weeks of their first meeting and they were married at Buchanan parish church on the shores of Loch Lomond in June 1970.

Known for her strong personality, Campbell encouraged her husband to become MP for North East Fife and was said to have persuaded him to stand in the 2006 Liberal Democrat leadership election, in which he was eventually victorious. She served as her husband's parliamentary assistant and was known for hosting grand dinner parties.

In her forties she studied for an Open University degree in English, choosing the television series Coronation Street, of which she was a fan, as the subject of her thesis.

She became Lady Campbell when her husband was knighted in 2004, and subsequently The Lady Campbell of Pittenweem when he was made a life peer in 2015.

Campbell died from a heart attack at home in Edinburgh, on 5 June 2023, at the age of 83.
