= Lord Richmond =

There have been many peerages in the British isles which refer to Richmond.

Richmond in Yorkshire

- Honour of Richmond
- Earl of Richmond
- Duke of Richmond
- William Hague, Baron Hague of Richmond
- Brenda Hale, Baroness Hale of Richmond
- Angela Harris, Baroness Harris of Richmond
- Nick Houghton, Baron Houghton of Richmond

Richmond in Greater London

- Zac Goldsmith, Baron Goldsmith of Richmond Park
- Chris Holmes, Baron Holmes of Richmond
- Alan Watson, Baron Watson of Richmond
- Patrick Wright, Baron Wright of Richmond

Other

- Anthony Royle, Baron Fanshawe of Richmond, of South Cerney in the County of Gloucestershire
