= Grant-Suttie baronets =

Baronetcy in the Baronetage of Nova Scotia

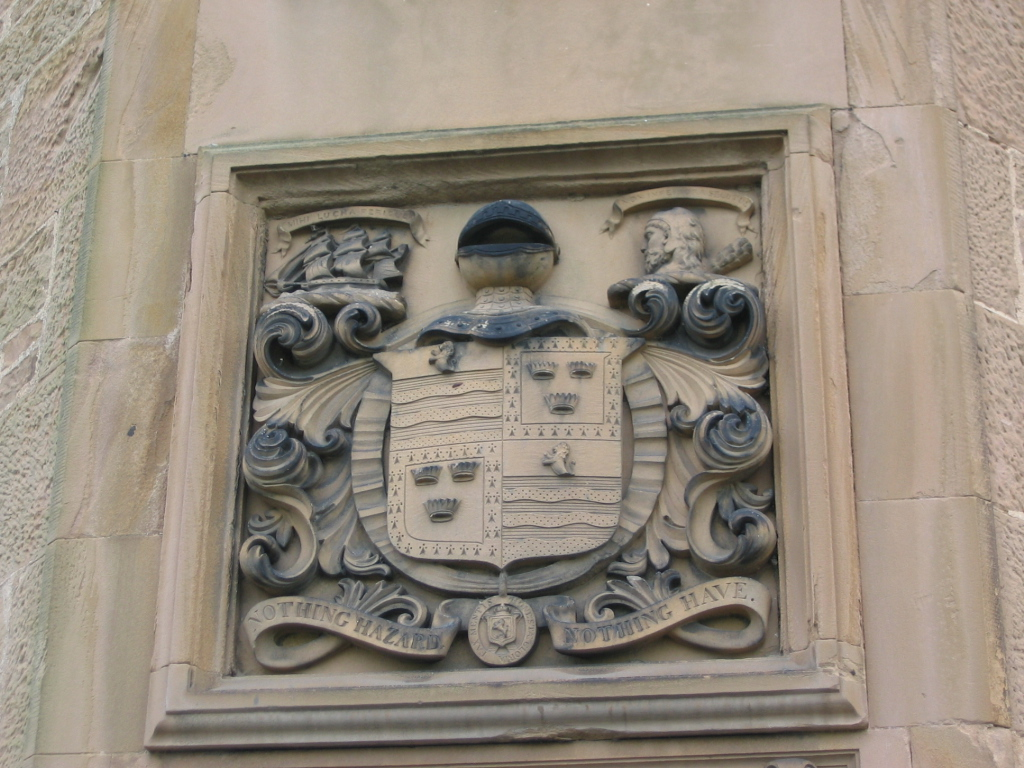
The arms of Grant-Suttie at Prestongrange House

The Suttie, later Grant-Suttie, baronetcy, of Balgone in the County of Haddington, is a title originally created in the Baronetage of Nova Scotia.

It was created on 5 May 1702 for George Suttie. The third and fourth Baronets both sat as Members of Parliament for Haddingtonshire. The latter assumed the additional surname of Grant on succeeding to the estates of his aunt, Janet, Countess of Hyndford, daughter of William Grant, Lord Prestongrange. Francis Grant-Suttie, second son of the fifth Baronet and grandfather of the eighth Baronet, was a captain in the Royal Navy.

A large number of the family lie buried in the old parish churchyard of North Berwick. The graves lie in three locations: within the church ruins; on the south side of the church; and against the south boundary. All graves are in very poor condition.

== Suttie, later Grant-Suttie, baronets, of Balgone (1702) ==
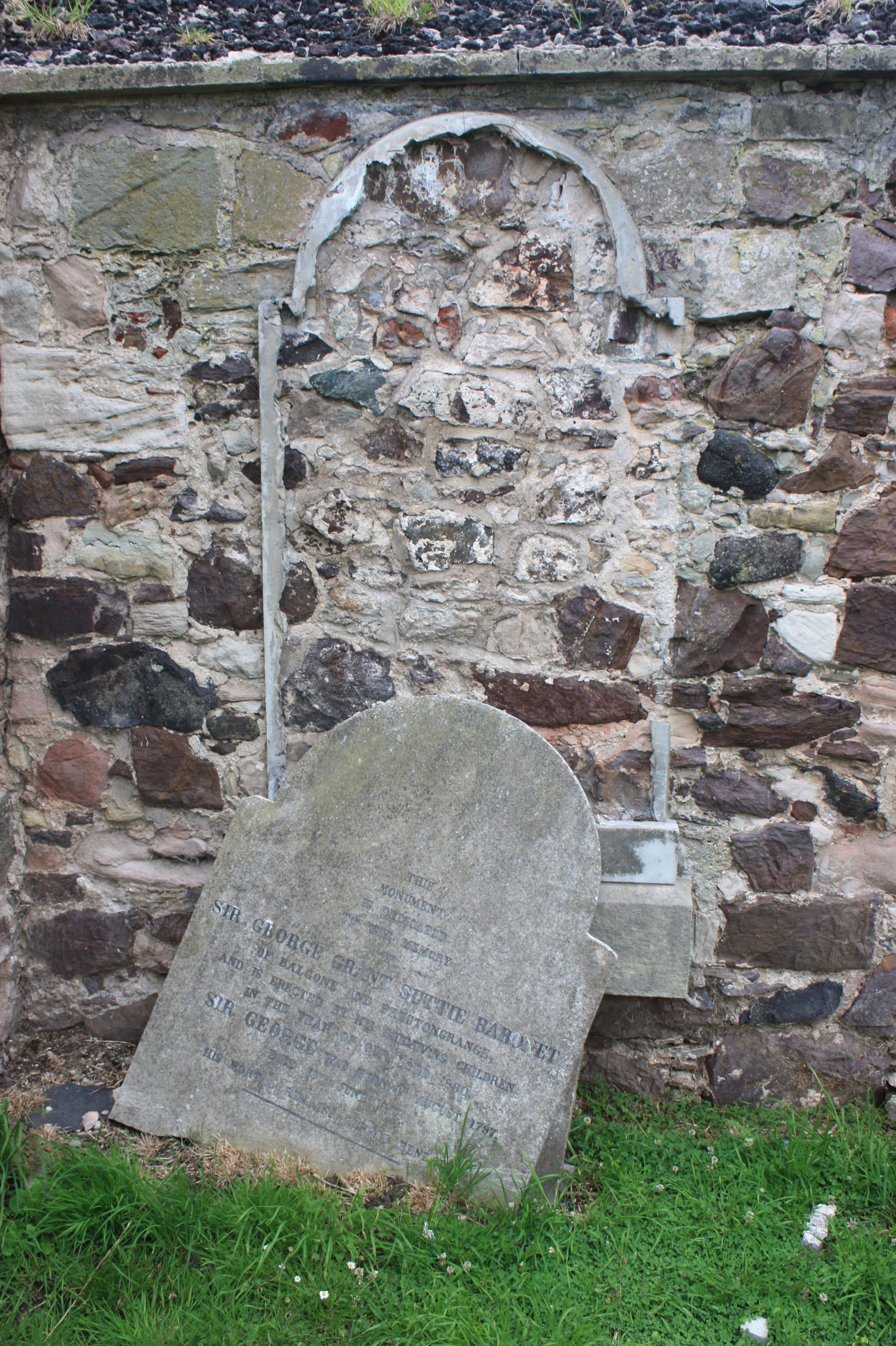
The broken grave of Sir George Grant Suttie (1797–1878), North Berwick churchyard

- Sir George Suttie, 1st Baronet (died 1710)
- Sir James Suttie, 2nd Baronet (1692–1736)
- Sir George Suttie, 3rd Baronet (1715–1783)
- Sir James Grant-Suttie, 4th Baronet (1759–1836)
- Sir George Grant-Suttie, 5th Baronet (1797–1878)
- Sir James Grant-Suttie, 6th Baronet (1830–1878)
- Sir George Grant-Suttie, 7th Baronet (1870–1947)
- Sir (George) Philip Grant-Suttie, 8th Baronet (1938–1997) who was married 1962 (div 1969) to Elspeth Urquhart, a daughter of General Roy Urquhart (of Operation Market Garden fame). Elspeth later became the wife of Menzies Campbell. They had one son, who succeeded his father:
- Sir James Edward Grant-Suttie, 9th Baronet (born 1965), who is married and has three sons.
- The heir apparent is his eldest son, Gregor Craig Grant-Suttie, who is married to Oriel Grant-Suttie née Octave (May 2023)- they have no children.
