= Sir George Suttie, 3rd Baronet =

Scottish politician

Sir George Suttie, 3rd Baronet (12 October 1715 – 25 November 1783), of Balgone House, Haddington, was a Scottish politician.

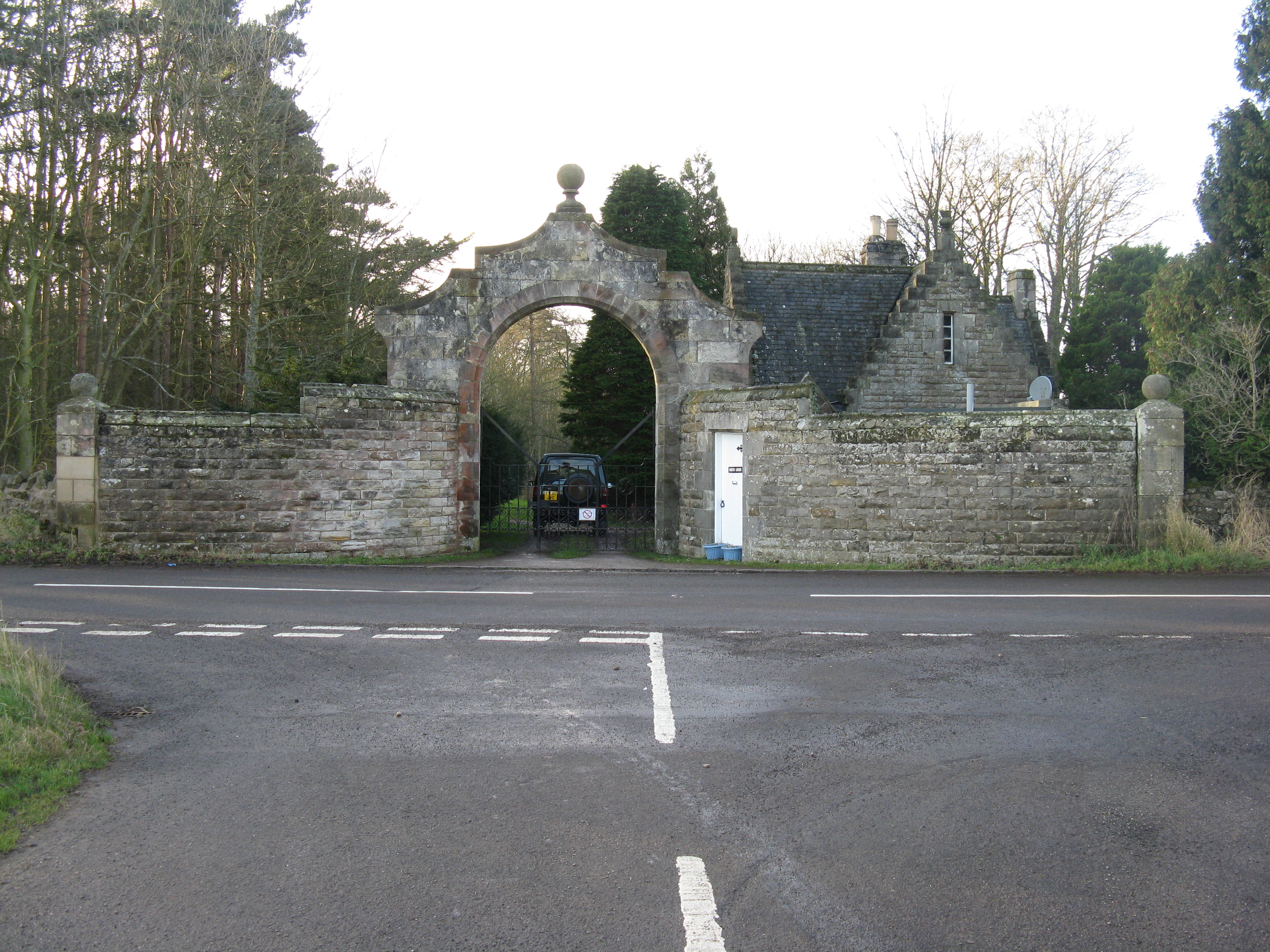
North Lodge, Balgone House

He was the eldest son of Sir James Suttie, 2nd Baronet, whom he succeeded in 1736.

He was a Member of Parliament (MP) for Haddingtonshire from 1768 to May 1777.

He died in 1783, having married Agnes, the daughter and coheiress of William Grant, Lord Prestongrange, They had 3 sons and 5 daughters.

Baronetage of Nova Scotia
Preceded by James Suttie	Baronet (of Balgone); 1736–1783	Succeeded by James Grant-Suttie
