= Wendy Chamberlain =

British Liberal Democrat politician

Wendy Chamberlain MP
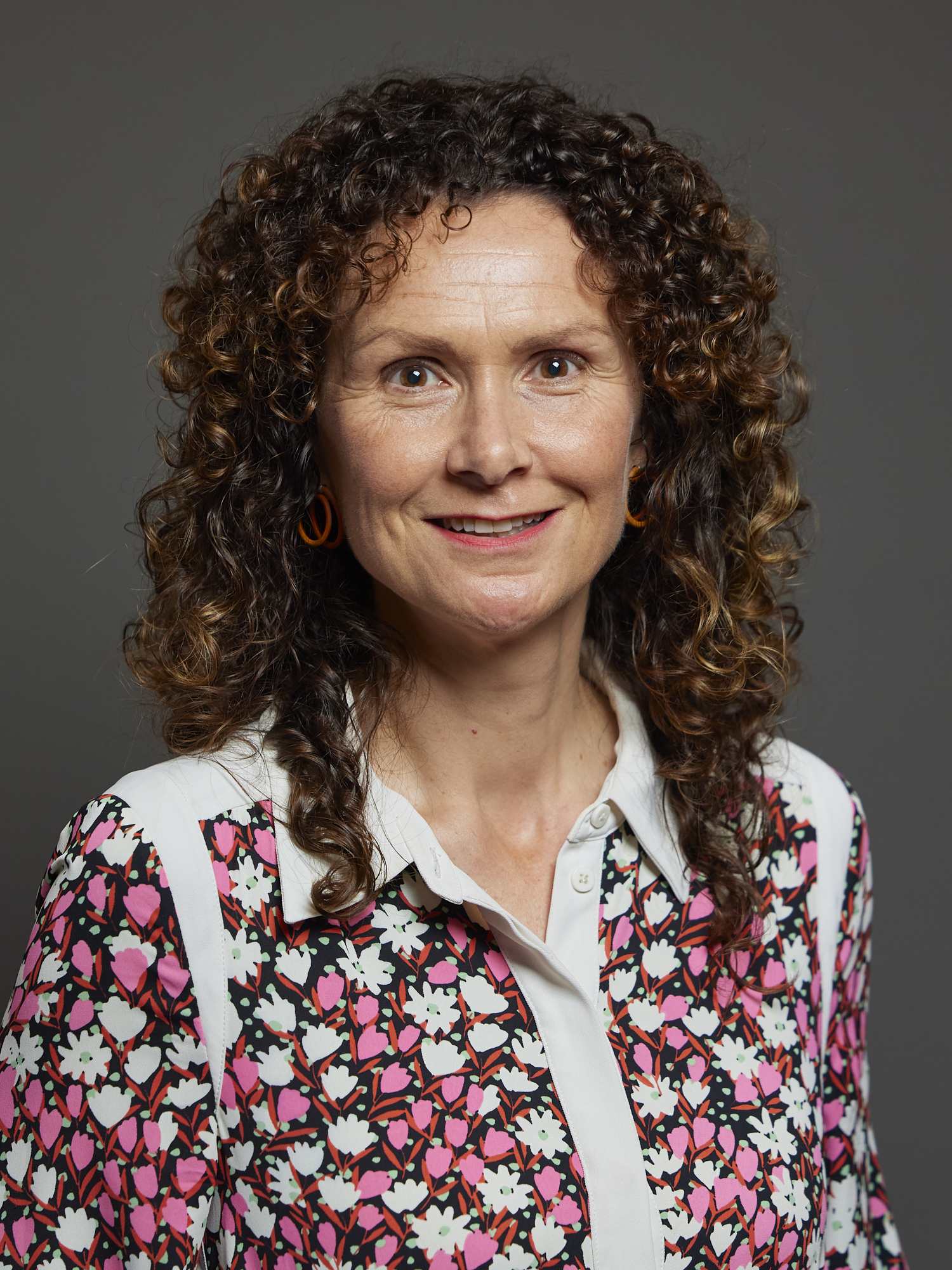
- Official portrait, 2024

Deputy Leader of the Scottish Liberal Democrats
- Incumbent
- Assumed office 3 December 2021
- Leader: Alex Cole-Hamilton
- Preceded by: Alistair Carmichael

Member of Parliament for North East Fife
- Incumbent
- Assumed office 12 December 2019
- Preceded by: Stephen Gethins
- Majority: 13,479 (31.5%)

Liberal Democrat portfolios
- 2020: Northern Ireland
- 2020: International Development
- 2020–2022: Scotland
- 2020–2022: Wales
- 2020–2024: Work and Pensions
- 2020–present: Chief Whip

Personal details
- Born: Wendy Anne Chamberlain; 20 December 1976 (age 49) Greenock, Scotland
- Party: Liberal Democrats
- Education: University of Edinburgh
- Website: www.wendychamberlain.scot

Wendy Anne Chamberlain (born 20 December 1976) is a British politician who has been the Member of Parliament (MP) for North East Fife since 2019. A member of the Scottish Liberal Democrats, she has served as Deputy Leader since 2021.

Chamberlain is the Chief Whip of the Liberal Democrats, the first woman to hold the post. She previously served as the Liberal Democrat Spokesperson for Work and Pensions to September 2024, the Liberal Democrat Spokesperson for Northern Ireland and International Development from January 2020 to September 2020, and as the Spokesperson for Scotland and Wales to July 2022. She sat on the Scottish Affairs Select Committee in the 2019 to 2024 parliament. She is currently the chair of the APPGs for Ending the Need for Food Banks, Afghan Women and Girls, Scotch Whisky, and PANS PANDAS.

== Early life and career ==
Wendy Chamberlain was born on 20 December 1976 in Greenock, the older of two daughters. She studied English at the University of Edinburgh, and was a member of the Edinburgh University Footlights, a student-run musical-theatre group, and performed in a show with the group at the Edinburgh Festival Fringe. The daughter of a police officer, after finishing university she joined the police force. During her twelve years as a police officer, Chamberlain worked for the Association of Chief Police Officers in Scotland and the Scottish Police College.

After leaving the police, Chamberlain worked as a Communications Lecturer at Fife College, before becoming a Training Manager for the Scottish Resettlement Centre, a Ministry of Defence contractor in Rosyth, and then a Capability Manager for British multinational alcoholic beverages company, Diageo. While working in the private sector, Chamberlain was a Member of the Chartered Management Institute and an Associate Member of the Chartered Institute of Personnel and Development. In 2017, Chamberlain became a member of the board of the Camanachd Association, the world governing body of the Scottish sport of shinty, becoming the first female director of the Association.

== Parliamentary career ==
Chamberlain joined the Liberal Democrats after the 2015 United Kingdom general election, which saw the party lose 49 of its 57 MPs. After standing in an "unwinnable" council seat (the ward of Rosyth in Fife Council) in the 2017 Scottish local elections, Chamberlain was asked by Scottish Liberal Democrat leader Willie Rennie to consider putting herself forward to stand in the 2017 general election. Chamberlain stood as a paper candidate in Stirling, where she finished fourth with 3.4% of the vote behind the Conservative Party's Stephen Kerr, the Scottish National Party's Steven Paterson, and the Labour Party candidate.

Chamberlain was selected as the prospective Parliamentary candidate for the Liberal Democrat target seat of North East Fife in June 2018, and in March 2019 was appointed as the Scottish Liberal Democrats' spokesperson for Constitutional Relations by Willie Rennie. Chamberlain was elected as MP for North East Fife at the 2019 general election, overturning the Scottish National Party's slim two-vote majority and winning with 43.1% of the vote and a majority of 1,316.

Following the election, Chamberlain was appointed as a party spokesperson in three areas: Political and Constitutional Reform; Scotland, Wales and Northern Ireland; and International Development. In a wide-ranging maiden speech, Chamberlain spoke about her constituency, gender equality, the European Union, and electoral reform, while also paying tribute to her predecessors.

During the course of the COVID-19 pandemic, Chamberlain expressed her belief that "civil liberties mustn't be curtailed more than necessary, and the powers mustn't be used disproportionately against minority communities", and called for vigilance "to ensure that those [emergency] powers are used properly and evenhandedly". Chamberlain wrote a letter calling for the resignation of Catherine Calderwood, the then Chief Medical Officer for Scotland, following reports that Calderwood had failed to follow coronavirus guidelines by visiting her second home, which was located in Chamberlain's constituency. In April 2020, following the decision to limit the number of MPs in the House of Commons, Chamberlain led a group of opposition MPs (from Plaid Cymru, the Social Democratic and Labour Party, the Alliance Party of Northern Ireland and the Green Party of England and Wales) in calling for the establishment of a COVID-19 select committee. Chamberlain stated that the creation of such a committee was "the only way to guarantee smaller parties from across the political spectrum the opportunity to scrutinise and ask questions of Ministers at this critical time". She sponsored the introduction of the Carer's Leave Bill in the House of Commons in 2022.

Chamberlain was one of three Liberal Democrat MPs (alongside Jamie Stone and Wera Hobhouse) to endorse Layla Moran in her ultimately unsuccessful campaign to become leader of the party.

At the 2024 general election, Chamberlain was re-elected to Parliament as MP for North East Fife with an increased vote share of 54.7% and an increased majority of 13,479.

== Personal life ==
Originally from Greenock, Chamberlain has lived in Fife since 2003. She is married, and has two children with her husband, Keith, who is a member of the Scottish National Party. Chamberlain has stated that her father encouraged her to get involved in politics.

Parliament of the United Kingdom
Preceded by Stephen Gethins	Member of Parliament for North East Fife; 2019–present	Incumbent
Party political offices
Preceded by Alistair Carmichael	Liberal Democrat Chief Whip of the House of Commons; 2020–present	Incumbent
