= Stephen Gethins =

Scottish National Party politician

Stephen Gethins MSP
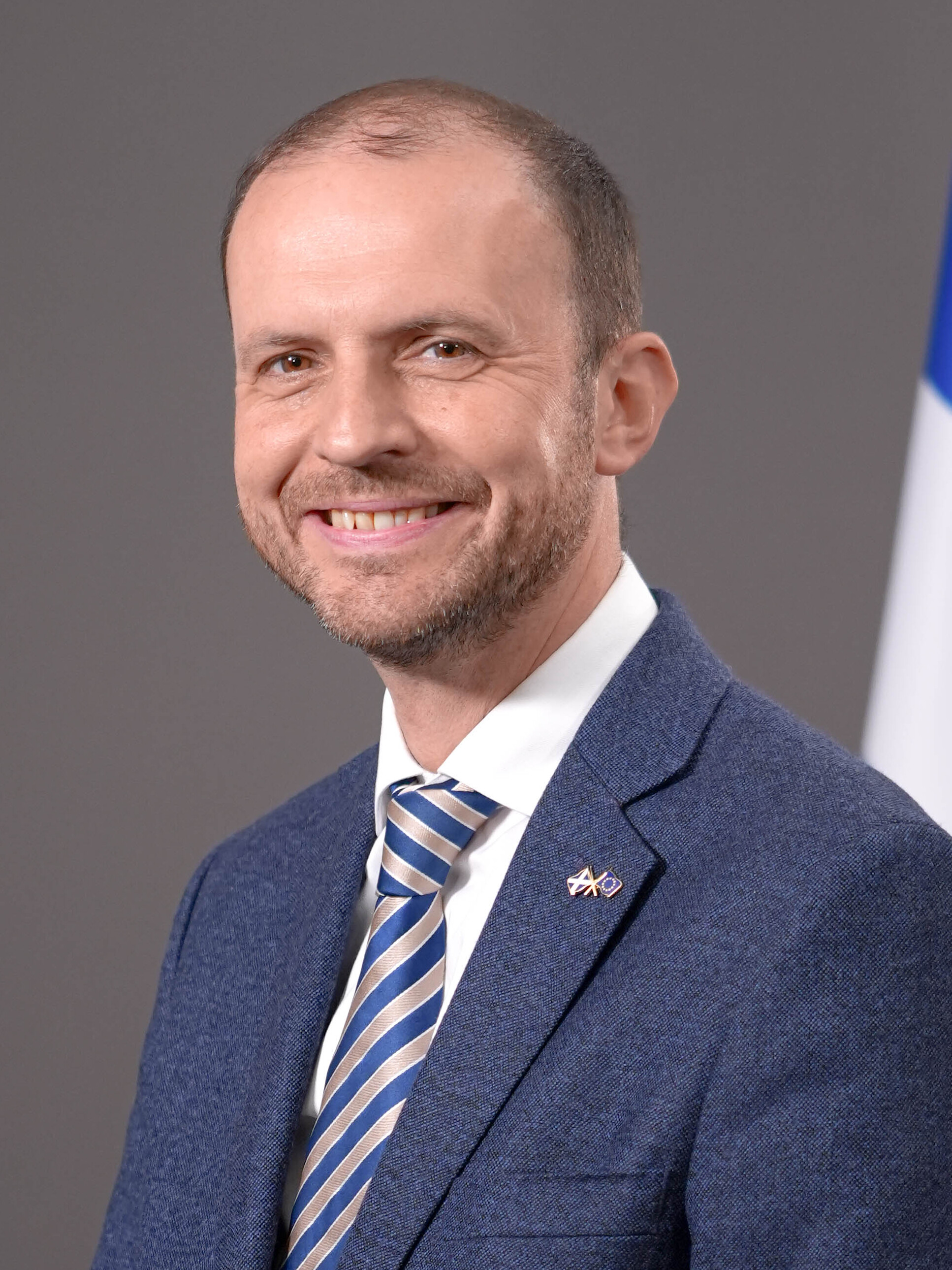
- Official portrait, 2026

Minister for Europe, External Affairs and Energy
- Incumbent
- Assumed office 21 May 2026
- First Minister: John Swinney
- Preceded by: Kaukab Stewart

Member of the Scottish Parliament for Dundee City East
- Incumbent
- Assumed office 7 May 2026
- Preceded by: Shona Robison
- Majority: 8,177 (30.8%)

SNP Spokesperson for International Affairs and Europe in the House of Commons
- In office 20 June 2017 – 12 December 2019
- Leader: Ian Blackford
- Preceded by: Alex Salmond
- Succeeded by: Alyn Smith

Member of Parliament
- In office 4 July 2024 – 14 May 2026
- Preceded by: Constituency established
- Succeeded by: Lara Bird
- Constituency: Arbroath and Broughty Ferry
- In office 7 May 2015 – 6 November 2019
- Preceded by: Menzies Campbell
- Succeeded by: Wendy Chamberlain
- Constituency: North East Fife

Personal details
- Born: Stephen Patrick Gethins; 28 March 1976 (age 50) Glasgow, Scotland
- Party: Scottish National Party
- Children: 2
- Education: University of Dundee; University of Kent

Stephen Patrick Gethins (born 28 March 1976) is a Scottish politician and academic who has served as Minister for Europe, External Affairs and Energy since May 2026. A member of the Scottish National Party (SNP), he has been the Member of the Scottish Parliament (MSP) for Dundee City East since the 2026 Scottish Parliament election.

He previously served as the Member of Parliament (MP) for North East Fife from 2015, until he lost the seat at the 2019 general election to Wendy Chamberlain of the Liberal Democrats. Subsequently, he was appointed Professor of Practice in International Relations at the University of St Andrews. He later served as the MP for Arbroath and Broughty Ferry between the 2024 general election and his election to the Scottish Parliament.

== Background and education ==
Gethins was born in Glasgow and brought up in Perth. He was educated at Perth Academy. He graduated with a Bachelor of Laws degree from the University of Dundee in 1998, specialising in public international law. He also holds a Master of Research from the University of Kent. He worked in the NGO Sector specialising in peace-building, arms control and democracy in the Caucasus and the Balkans regions. He worked with NGO Links in Tbilisi focusing on the conflicts surrounding the breakaway entities in the South Caucasus such as South Ossetia, Abkhazia and Nagorno-Karabakh. He also worked for Saferworld on arms control, peace-building and democratisation in the former Soviet Union and Balkans.

== Political career ==
Gethins was appointed a Special Adviser to Scotland's First Minister, Alex Salmond, advising on European and International Affairs as well as Rural Affairs, Energy and Climate Change and subsequently advised Nicola Sturgeon. He was a Political Advisor with the Committee of the Regions in the European Union, a position which saw him working with local authorities from across Europe. He also worked at Scotland Europa.

He was on the list of SNP candidates for the six Scottish seats in the 2014 European Parliament election, although only the first two SNP candidates were elected.

=== UK Parliament ===
In February 2015, he was selected by the local party members to contest the 2015 general election at the North East Fife constituency. He won 18,523 votes (a 40.9% share of the vote) and received a majority of 4,344 votes over the Liberal Democrat candidate, Tim Brett, who was selected after the retirement of the seat's long-term Lib Dem MP and former party leader, Menzies Campbell. In May 2015, the SNP made him their Spokesperson on Europe at Westminster. In July he was appointed as a member of the House of Commons Foreign Affairs Select Committee.

At the 2017 general election, Gethins was narrowly re-elected as the MP for North East Fife. He received 13,743 votes, giving him a very slim majority of just two votes over the Liberal Democrats; the joint-third smallest majority in British political history. This was confirmed after three re-counts before being declared. After the election, Gethins was promoted to the SNP Westminster frontbench team of Ian Blackford as the party's Spokesperson for International Affairs and Europe.

Despite increasing his share of the vote, he lost his seat at the 2019 general election to the Liberal Democrat candidate, Wendy Chamberlain who won by a majority of 1,316 votes. This made him the only SNP MP to lose their seat at the general election that year.

=== After Westminster ===
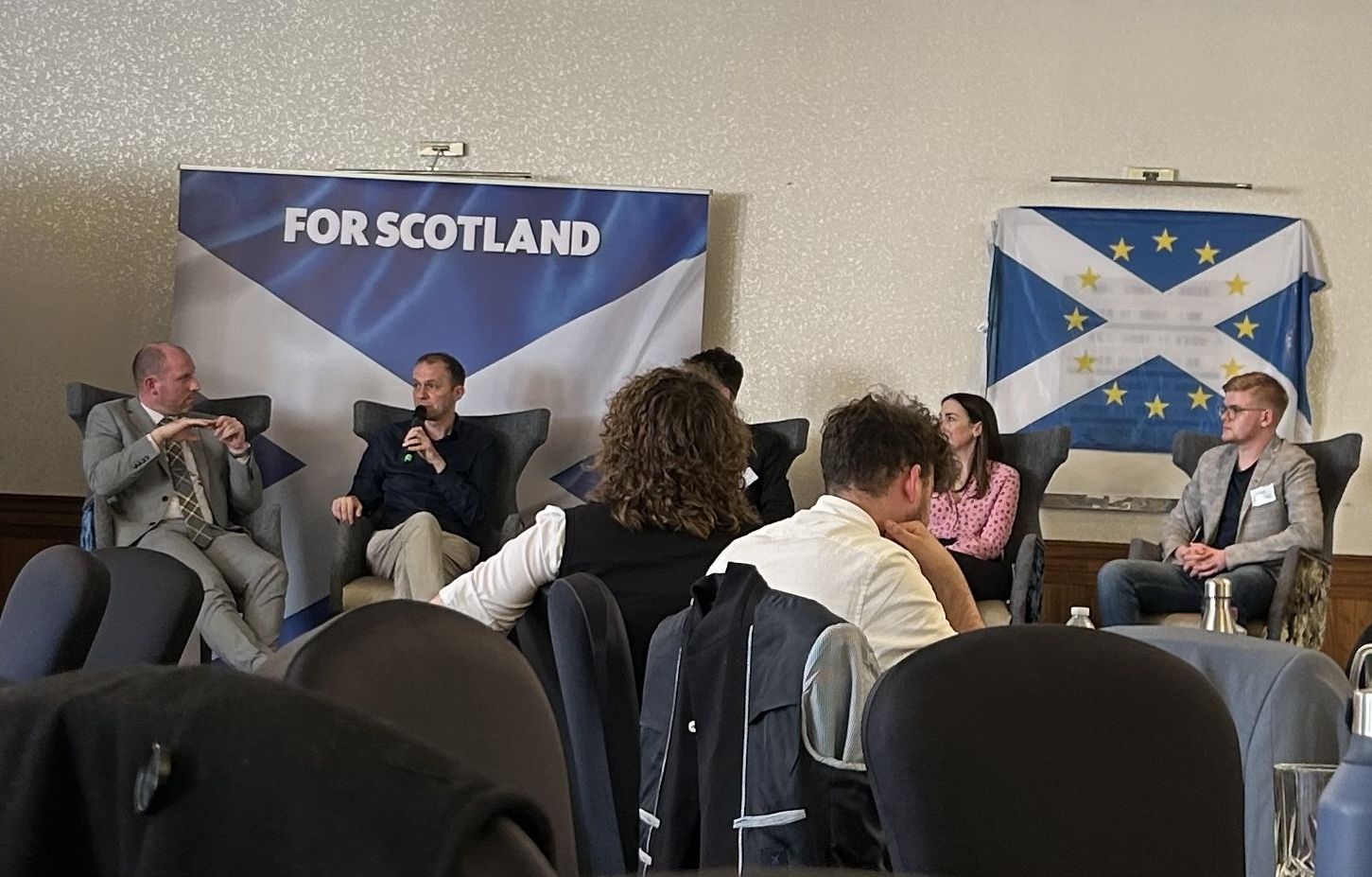
Gethins (centre left) at the YSI International Conference in 2024.

After losing his Westminster seat Gethins was appointed Professor of Practice in International Relations at the University of St Andrews.

In July 2020, Gethins was announced as the chair of ‘eu+me’- a campaign for a close relationship between Scotland and the EU after Brexit.

=== Return to Westminster ===
In 2023, he was named the SNP prospective parliamentary candidate for the new constituency of Arbroath and Broughty Ferry. In the 2024 general election, Gethins became the first MP for the seat, securing 15,581 votes (35.3%) and a majority of 859 votes (1.9%). The constituency incorporated parts of the former Dundee East and surrounding Angus areas following the 2023 boundary revisions.

In his remarks to The Scotsman, Gethins expressed enthusiasm about returning to Parliament, describing it as a privilege. He reflected that his time at St Andrews allowed him to adopt a valuable “long view” of politics and international affairs. Gethins reaffirmed his belief that rejoining the European Union is “inevitable,” highlighting the shrinking gap between public opinion and political action.

Upon his return to Westminster, he took on frontbench responsibilities. He serves as Shadow SNP Spokesperson for Scotland and for International Affairs. From November 2024, Gethins joined the Speaker’s Committee on the Electoral Commission. He also presented a Private Members' Bill, the Devolution (Immigration) (Scotland) Bill, in October 2024.

Since returning to Parliament, Gethins has taken on key leadership roles in several All‑Party Parliamentary Groups (APPGs) – informal cross-party groups that enable MPs to collaborate on specific issues beyond formal committee structures. He is the Chair for the APPG on Russia and Democracy, which scrutinises parliamentary responses to the threats posed by Vladimir Putin’s regime, promotes UK security, and acts as a conduit to pro-democracy networks opposing the Russian government.

He also serves as Vice‑Chair of the APPGs on Bosnia and Herzegovina, Syria, Sudan and South Sudan, and University.

He was elected to the Scottish Parliament in the 2026 Scottish Parliament election and announced his resignation, triggering a by-election.

== Personal life ==
Gethins lives in Fife with his wife and children.

Parliament of the United Kingdom
| Preceded by Menzies Campbell | Member of Parliament for North East Fife; 2015–2019 | Succeeded by Wendy Chamberlain |
| New constituency | Member of Parliament for Arbroath and Broughty Ferry; 2024–2026 | Succeeded by Lara Bird |
