= Athletics at the 1967 Summer Universiade – Men's 4 × 400 metres relay =

The men's 4 × 400 metres relay event at the 1967 Summer Universiade was held at the National Olympic Stadium in Tokyo on 4 September 1967.

== Results ==
Rank	Nation	Athletes	Time	Notes
1st place, gold medalist(s)	West Germany	Werner Thiemann, Rolf Krüsmann, Helmar Müller, Ingo Röper	3:06.7	
2nd place, silver medalist(s)	Great Britain	Howard Davies, Mike Hauck, Menzies Campbell, John Sherwood	3:06.7	
3rd place, bronze medalist(s)	Australia	Ralph Doubell, Peter Griffin, Phil King, Greg Lewis	3:08.4	
4	France	Alain Hebrard, Pierre Gaudry, Michel Samper, Christian Nicolau	3:08.5	
5	Italy	Gian Cellerino, Sergio Bello, Furio Fusi, Bruno Bianchi	3:09.4	
6	Japan	Yoshinori Sakai, Akitoshi Inoue, Masami Yoshida, Toshiki Hoshika	3:09.5	
7	Brazil	Paulo Bergamaco, Hugo Kuriz Lisboa, Jurandir Ienne, Oscar Prado	3:17.1	
