= Alistair Carmichael =

British politician (born 1965)

The Right Honourable Alistair Carmichael MP
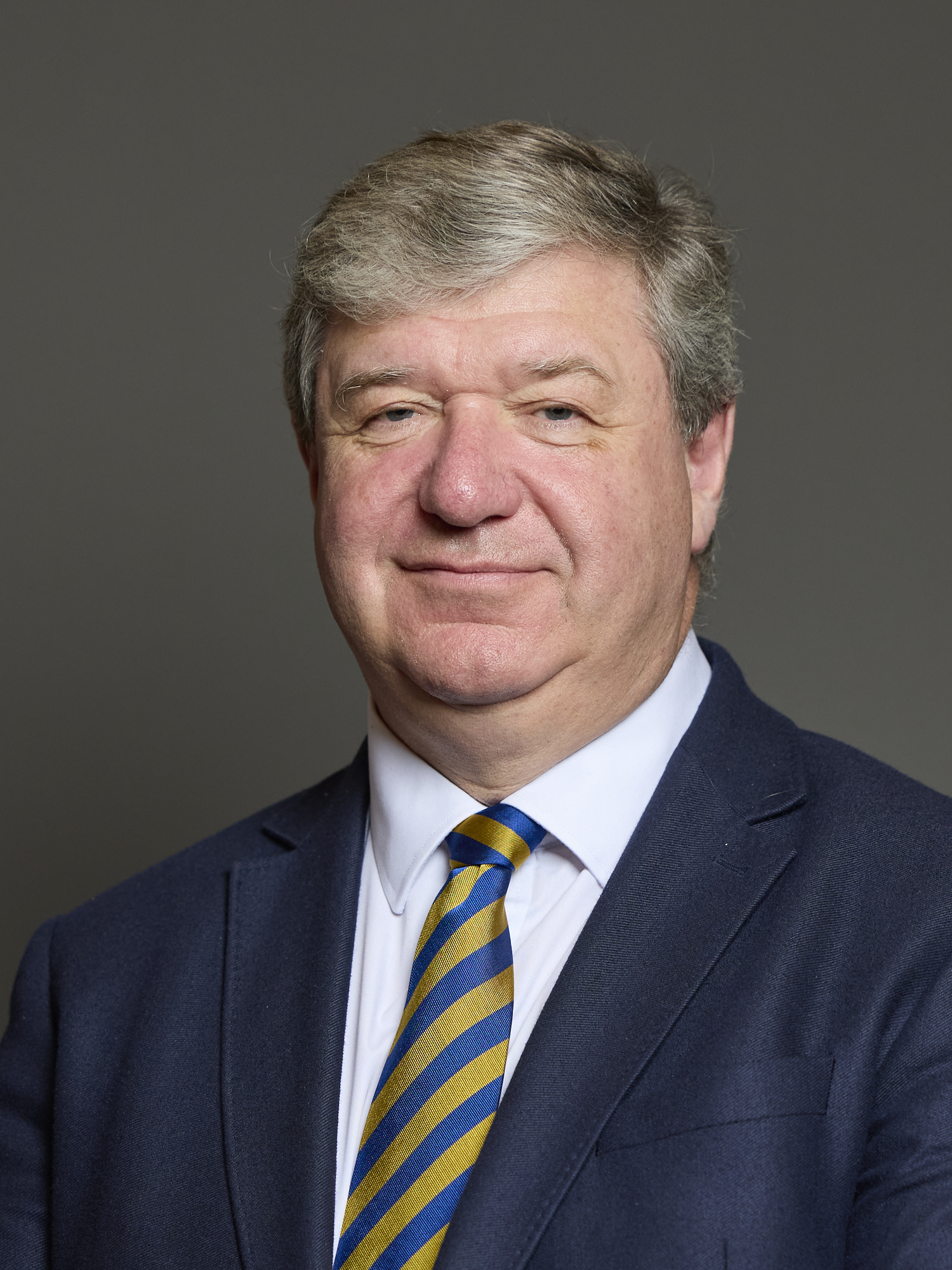
- Official portrait, 2024

Chair of the Environment, Food and Rural Affairs Select Committee
- Incumbent
- Assumed office 9 September 2024
- Preceded by: Robert Goodwill

Deputy Leader of the Scottish Liberal Democrats
- In office 23 September 2012 – 3 December 2021
- Leader: Willie Rennie; Himself (acting); Alex Cole-Hamilton
- Preceded by: Jo Swinson
- Succeeded by: Wendy Chamberlain

Leader of the Scottish Liberal Democrats
- Acting; 20 July 2021 – 20 August 2021
- Leader: Ed Davey
- Preceded by: Willie Rennie
- Succeeded by: Alex Cole-Hamilton

Secretary of State for Scotland
- In office 7 October 2013 – 8 May 2015
- Prime Minister: David Cameron
- Preceded by: Michael Moore
- Succeeded by: David Mundell

Deputy Government Chief Whip in the House of Commons Comptroller of the Household
- In office 11 May 2010 – 7 October 2013
- Prime Minister: David Cameron
- Preceded by: John Spellar
- Succeeded by: Don Foster

Chief Whip of the Liberal Democrats
- In office 16 June 2017 – 27 August 2020
- Leader: Vince Cable; Jo Swinson; Ed Davey
- Preceded by: Tom Brake
- Succeeded by: Wendy Chamberlain
- In office 11 May 2010 – 7 October 2013
- Leader: Nick Clegg
- Preceded by: Paul Burstow
- Succeeded by: Don Foster

Member of Parliament for Orkney and Shetland
- Incumbent
- Assumed office 7 June 2001
- Preceded by: Jim Wallace
- Majority: 7,807 (37.7%)

Liberal Democrat portfolios
- 2006, 2015–2016, 2020–2024: Home Affairs
- 2007–2010 (Note: Role briefly covered by Michael Moore from 5 March 2008 to 7 October 2008 during Vince Cable's acting leadership.): Scotland Office
- 2019: Environment, Food and Rural Affairs
- 2020: Foreign and Commonwealth Office; Exiting the European Union
- 2017–2024 (Note: Role briefly covered by Wendy Chamberlain from 6 January 2020 to 1 September 2020 during Ed Davey's acting leadership.): Northern Ireland Office
- 2022–2024: Justice

Personal details
- Born: Alexander Morrison Carmichael; 15 July 1965 (age 61) Islay, Inner Hebrides, Scotland
- Party: Liberal Democrats (since 1988); Liberal (before 1988)
- Spouse: Kate Carmichael (m. 1987)
- Children: 2
- Education: University of Aberdeen (LLB)
- Website: www.alistaircarmichael.co.uk

Alexander Morrison "Alistair" Carmichael (born 15 July 1965) is a British politician who has been the Member of Parliament (MP) for Orkney and Shetland since 2001. A member of the Scottish Liberal Democrats, he previously served in the Cameron–Clegg coalition as Secretary of State for Scotland from 2013 to 2015 and as Deputy Government Chief Whip from 2010 to 2013. He currently serves as the Chair of the Environment, Food and Rural Affairs Select Committee.

Carmichael served as Liberal Democrat Chief Whip of the House of Commons from 2010 to 2013. From 7 October 2013 to 8 May 2015, he was the Secretary of State for Scotland in the Conservative-Lib Dem coalition government. He served a second term as Chief Whip from 2017 to 2020, having taken over the position from Tom Brake following the 2017 general election. He was the Liberal Democrat Spokesman for Foreign and Commonwealth Affairs and Exiting the European Union from January 2020 to August 2020. He was previously the Deputy Leader of the Scottish Liberal Democrats from 2012 to 2021. He was Liberal Democrat Spokesperson for Home Affairs, Justice and for Northern Ireland until his election as select committee chair in September 2024.

He was the only Scottish MP representing the Liberal Democrats in the House of Commons during the 2015–2017 Parliament. He is the longest-serving Liberal Democrat MP and their senior Scottish MP in the current UK Parliament.

== Early life and career ==
Alexander Carmichael was born on 15 July 1965 to hill farming parents on Islay in the Inner Hebrides, and went on to attend Port Ellen Primary School and Islay High School. He worked between 1984 and 1989 as a hotel manager after 2 years of study at the University of Glasgow. There, he was a member of the Students' Representative Council and President of the Liberal Club. He ultimately left his course early. He returned to education at the University of Aberdeen, where he gained an LLB in 1992, qualifying as a solicitor in 1993. From 1993 to 1996, he was a Procurator Fiscal Depute for Edinburgh and Aberdeen, and from 1996 to 2001 he was a solicitor with Aberdeen and Macduff.

== Parliamentary career ==
Carmichael first stood for Parliament at Paisley South in 1987 as the Liberal candidate, being defeated by the sitting Labour MP, Norman Buchan. He finished in second place, achieving 15.1% of the vote, which was down 9% from 1983.

At the 2001 general election, he was elected as the MP for Orkney and Shetland, succeeding the Liberal Democrat MP Jim Wallace, who had chosen to stand for the Scottish Parliament constituency of Orkney instead. Carmichael won with 41.3% of the vote, a decrease of 10.7% from the 1997 general election, and with a majority of 3,475, nearly half of the 6,968 majority won by Wallace in 1997. One of the constituency's previous MPs was the Liberal Party leader Jo Grimond.

Carmichael was re-elected at the 2005 general election with an increased vote share of 51.5% and an increased majority of 6,627.

Carmichael was appointed Liberal Democrat Northern Ireland and Scotland Spokesman by Sir Menzies Campbell in July 2007, but resigned in March 2008 to vote in favour of a referendum on the Lisbon Treaty. He was reappointed to the position by Nick Clegg in October 2008. He had also briefly served as the Liberal Democrat Home Affairs spokesman, following the resignation of Mark Oaten.

In June 2009, Carmichael was involved in a successful campaign against the book by Max Scratchmann, Chucking it All: How Downsizing to a Windswept Scottish Island Did Absolutely Nothing to Improve My Life, an irreverent account of the author's experience downshifting from Manchester to Orkney, which Carmichael said was "hurtful and vindictive", and attacked a number of "clearly identifiable" residents of the islands. Carmichael's complaints to the publisher led them to cancel publication.

Carmichael was re-elected at the 2010 general election with an increased vote share of 62.0% and an increased majority of 9,928.

At the beginning of the Liberal Democrat - Conservative coalition government in May 2010, Carmichael was appointed Deputy Chief Whip and Comptroller of the Household.

In 2011, Carmichael was elected Honorary President of the Scottish Liberal Democrats youth wing, Liberal Youth Scotland.

=== Deputy Leader of the Scottish Liberal Democrats and Secretary of State for Scotland ===
Carmichael took over from Jo Swinson as Deputy Leader of the Scottish Liberal Democrats on 23 September 2012 at the Annual Liberal Democrat Conference in Brighton.

In October 2013, he was promoted by Nick Clegg to the position of Secretary of State for Scotland in the UK Cabinet, replacing Michael Moore.

Carmichael retained his seat at the 2015 general election, the only Liberal Democrat in Scotland out of 11 MPs elected in 2010 who managed to do so. He was re-elected, but saw his vote share decrease by 20.6%, and saw his majority cut from 9,928 to just 817. Carmichael was one of only eight Liberal Democrat MPs returned to Parliament.

Following the resignation of Nick Clegg as party leader, Alistair Carmichael took temporary charge of the Liberal Democrats in the House of Commons, under the de facto leadership of Party President Sal Brinton.

==== Campaign memo and election petition ====
On 4 April 2015, during the general election campaign Carmichael was involved in the leaking of a memo from the Scotland Office about comments allegedly made by the French ambassador Sylvie Bermann about Nicola Sturgeon, claiming that Sturgeon had privately stated she would "rather see David Cameron remain as PM", in contrast to her publicly stated opposition to a Conservative government. The veracity of the memo was quickly denied by the French ambassador, French Consul General and Sturgeon herself.

At the time of the leak, Carmichael denied all knowledge of the leaking of the memo in a television interview with Channel 4 News. After the election, Carmichael accepted the contents of the memo were incorrect, and admitted that he had lied, and that he had authorised the leaking of the inaccurate memo to the media. This was after a Cabinet Office enquiry identified Carmichael's role in the leak. The enquiry found phone records that proved Euan Roddin, Carmichael's Special Adviser, contacted the Telegraph on 1 April, two days before the story appeared. Carmichael apologised and accepted that had he still been a government minister, this was a matter that would have "required [his] resignation".

Four electors from Orkney and Shetland lodged an election petition on 29 May 2015, the last date possible to do this following the general election on 7 May, attempting to unseat Carmichael and force a by-election. On 2 June 2015, the Parliamentary Standards Commissioner launched an investigation into his conduct, under sections 10, 14 and 16 of the Code of Conduct, but this investigation was dropped because Carmichael became aware of the memo via the Scottish Office and not in his capacity as an MP. On 9 December 2015, it was decided it had not been proven beyond reasonable doubt that he had committed an "illegal practice" and he was allowed to retain his seat. In February 2016, his application for costs was rejected, leaving him £150,000 out of pocket. Scottish Liberal Democrat leader Willie Rennie contributed £750 towards his costs. Carmichael was awarded £50,000 towards the costs from the Joseph Rowntree Reform Trust.

Carmichael was again re-elected at the snap 2017 general election with an increased vote share of 48.6% and an increased majority of 4,563. He was again re-elected at the 2019 general election, with a decreased vote share of 44.8% and a decreased majority of 2,507. At the 2024 general election, Carmichael was again re-elected, with an increased vote share of 55.1% and an increased majority of 7,807.

=== After the 2024 General Election ===
On 9 September 2024, Alistair Carmichael was elected as Chair of the Environment, Food and Rural Affairs Select Committee.

== Personal life ==
He married Kathryn Jane Eastham in 1987. They have two sons (born in 1997 and 2001) and the family reside in Orkney where she is a local veterinary surgeon. He speaks French and German. Carmichael is an elder in the Church of Scotland.

== Notes ==
Parliament of the United Kingdom
| Preceded by Jim Wallace | Member of Parliament for Orkney and Shetland; 2001–present | Incumbent |
Party political offices
| Preceded by Paul Burstow | Liberal Democrat Chief Whip of the House of Commons; 2010–2013 | Succeeded by Don Foster |
| Preceded by Jo Swinson | Deputy Leader of the Scottish Liberal Democrats; 2012–present | Incumbent |
| Preceded by Tom Brake | Liberal Democrat Chief Whip of the House of Commons; 2017–present | Incumbent |
Political offices
| Preceded by John Spellar | Government Deputy Chief Whip of the House of Commons; 2010–2013 | Succeeded by Don Foster |
| Preceded by John Spellar | Comptroller of the Household; 2010–2013 | Succeeded by Don Foster |
| Preceded by Michael Moore | Secretary of State for Scotland; 2013–2015 | Succeeded by David Mundell |
