= Athletics at the 1967 Summer Universiade – Men's 200 metres =

The men's 200 metres event at the 1967 Summer Universiade was held at the National Olympic Stadium in Tokyo on 2 and 3 September 1967.

== Medalists ==
Gold	Silver	Bronze
Tommie Smith; United States	Menzies Campbell; Great Britain	Ippolito Giani; Italy

== Results ==
=== Heats ===
Rank	Heat	Athlete	Nationality	Time	Notes
1	1	Tommie Smith	United States	21.6	Q
2	1	Ramón Magariños	Spain	22.0	Q
3	1	Pierre Burrelier	France	22.1	Q
4	1	Masayuki Umeda	Japan	22.4	Q
5	1	Francisco Trinos	Philippines	23.4	
1	2	Hiromitsu Murata	Japan	21.6	Q
2	2	Ippolito Giani	Italy	21.8	Q
3	2	Christian Nicolau	France	22.0	Q
4	2	Philippe Clerc	Switzerland	22.6	Q
5	2	Luís Silva	Portugal	22.9	
6	2	Yu Ken Sum	Hong Kong	24.4	
1	3	Menzies Campbell	Great Britain	21.5	Q
2	3	Phil King	Australia	21.9	Q
3	3	Herman Van Coppenolle	Belgium	22.1	Q
4	3	Bernd-Josef Barlage	West Germany	22.4	Q
5	3	Leo de Winter	Netherlands	22.4	
6	3	Paulo Bergamasco	Brazil	22.5	
1	4	Greg Lewis	Australia	21.4	Q
2	4	Livio Berruti	Italy	21.7	Q
3	4	Mike Hauck	Great Britain	21.9	Q
4	4	Agus Sugiri	Indonesia	22.0	Q
5	4	Admilson Chitarra	Brazil	22.7	

=== Semifinals ===
Rank	Heat	Athlete	Nationality	Time	Notes
1	1	Tommie Smith	United States	21.0	Q
2	1	Menzies Campbell	Great Britain	21.2	Q
3	1	Ippolito Giani	Italy	21.5	Q
4	1	Phil King	Australia	21.6	Q
5	1	Agus Sugiri	Indonesia	22.1	
6	1	Christian Nicolau	France	22.1	
7	1	Masayuki Umeda	Japan	22.5	
	1	Bernd-Josef Barlage	West Germany	?	
1	2	Greg Lewis	Australia	21.2	Q
2	2	Livio Berruti	Italy	21.2	Q
3	2	Hiromitsu Murata	Japan	21.4	Q
4	2	Pierre Burrelier	France	21.4	Q
5	2	Mike Hauck	Great Britain	21.5	
6	2	Herman Van Coppenolle	Belgium	21.8	
7	2	Ramón Magariños	Spain	21.8	
8	2	Philippe Clerc	Switzerland	22.4	

=== Final ===
Wind: -1.1 m/s

Rank	Name	Nationality	Time	Notes
1st place, gold medalist(s)	Tommie Smith	United States	20.7	
2nd place, silver medalist(s)	Menzies Campbell	Great Britain	21.2	
3rd place, bronze medalist(s)	Ippolito Giani	Italy	21.3	
4	Phil King	Australia	21.5	
5	Greg Lewis	Australia	21.5	
6	Livio Berruti	Italy	21.5	
7	Pierre Burrelier	France	21.6	
8	Hiromitsu Murata	Japan	21.6	
