= Liberal Democrat Home Affairs spokesperson =

UK political party position

The Liberal Democrat Home Affairs spokesperson is the spokesperson for the Liberal Democrats on matters relating to the work of the Home Secretary and Home Office. The office holder is a member of the Liberal Democrat frontbench team. The post exists when the Liberal Democrats are in opposition, but not when they in government, for example during the Cameron–Clegg coalition.

The position is also sometimes called the Liberal Democrat shadow home secretary.

== List of Home Affairs spokespersons ==
Name	Portrait	Took office	Left office	Frontbench team
Robert Maclennan		March 1988	July 1994	Steel Maclennan
Robert Maclennan		March 1988	July 1994	Ashdown
Alan Beith		12 July 1994	29 August 1999	Ashdown
Alan Beith		12 July 1994	29 August 1999	Kennedy
Simon Hughes		29 August 1999	12 June 2003	Kennedy
Mark Oaten		12 June 2003	21 January 2006	Kennedy
Alistair Carmichael (Oaten's deputy until Oaten's resignation, then Carmichael took-over as spokesman)		10 May 2005	2 March 2006	Kennedy
Nick Clegg		5 March 2006	18 December 2007	Campbell
Nick Clegg		5 March 2006	18 December 2007	Cable I
Chris Huhne		20 December 2007	11 May 2010	Clegg
Vacant – Liberal Democrats part of the Cameron–Clegg coalition (Note: Julian Huppert sat on the Home Affairs Select Committee from 2010 to 2015, while Jeremy Browne served as Minister of State for the Home Office between 2012 and 2013, followed by Norman Baker between 2013 and 2014 and Lynne Featherstone between 2014 and 2015.)		11 May 2010	7 January 2015	–
Lynne Featherstone		7 January 2015	8 May 2015	Clegg's General Election Cabinet
Alistair Carmichael		29 July 2015	16 June 2017	Farron
The Lord Paddick		1 June 2015	14 June 2017	Farron
Ed Davey		16 June 2017	21 August 2019	Farron
Ed Davey		16 June 2017	21 August 2019	Cable II
Christine Jardine		21 August 2019	7 September 2020	Swinson
Christine Jardine		21 August 2019	7 September 2020	Davey (acting)
Alistair Carmichael		7 September 2020	18 September 2024	Davey
Lisa Smart		18 September 2024	30 September 2025	Davey
Max Wilkinson		1 October 2025	Incumbent	Davey

== Spokespersons for Home Affairs in the House of Lords ==
Spokespersons for the Liberal Democrats on Home Affairs in the House of Lords:

Name	Portrait	Took office	Left office
Lord Dholakia		2002	2007
Baroness Miller of Chilthorne Domer		2007	2010
Vacant
Lord (Brian) Paddick		1 June 2015	9 October 2023

== See also ==
- Liberal Democrat frontbench team
