= Roy Urquhart =

British military officer (1901–1988)

Major-General Roy Urquhart CB DSO & Bar
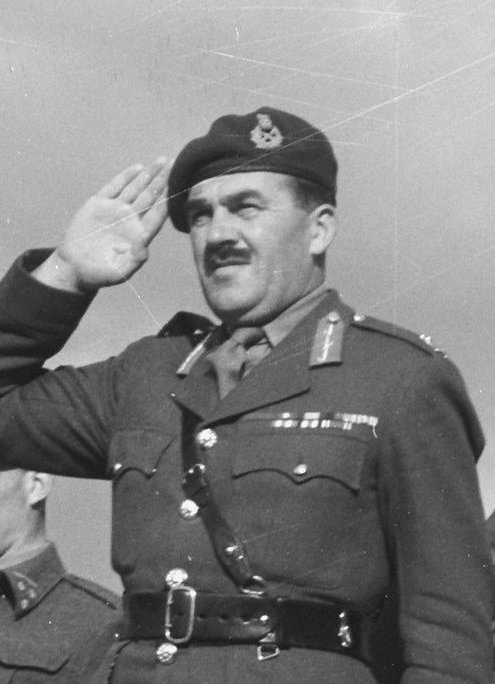
- Urquhart in September 1945
- Born: Robert Elliot Urquhart; 28 November 1901; Shepperton, Middlesex, England
- Died: 13 December 1988 (aged 87); Menteith, Perthshire, Scotland
- Spouse: Pamela Edith Condon
- Military career
- Allegiance: United Kingdom
- Branch: British Army
- Service years: 1920–1955
- Rank: Major-General
- Service number: 17550
- Unit: Highland Light Infantry
- Commands: British Troops in Austria (1952–1955); Malaya Command (1950–1952); 51st/52nd Scottish Division (1948–1950); 16th Airborne Division (1947–1948); 1st Airborne Division (1944–1945); 231st Infantry Brigade (1943); 2nd Battalion, Duke of Cornwall's Light Infantry (1941–1942)
- Conflicts: Arab revolt in Palestine; Second World War; Malayan Emergency
- Awards: Companion of the Order of the Bath; Distinguished Service Order & Bar; Bronze Lion (Netherlands); Order of St. Olav (Norway)

Major-General Robert Elliot "Roy" Urquhart, CB, DSO & Bar (28 November 1901 – 13 December 1988) was a British Army officer who saw service during the Second World War and Malayan Emergency. He became prominent for his role as general officer commanding the 1st Airborne Division, which fought with great distinction, although suffering very severe casualties, in the Battle of Arnhem during Operation Market Garden in September 1944.

== Early life and military career ==
Roy Urquhart was born in Shepperton, Middlesex, England, on 28 November 1901, and was the son of a Scottish doctor. He was educated at St Paul's School, London, and the Royal Military College, Sandhurst. Urquhart was commissioned as a second lieutenant into the 1st Battalion, Highland Light Infantry on 24 December 1920.

On 24 December 1922, he was promoted to lieutenant, and captain on 26 March 1929. Urquhart was assigned to the 2nd Battalion, when he was stationed in Malta from 1933 to 1936. He also served as an adjutant, and befriended David Niven during this time. Niven recalled Urquhart, in his autobiography The Moon's a Balloon, as "a serious soldier of great charm and warmth".

Urquhart attended the Staff College, Camberley, from 1936 to 1937, and then returned to the 2nd Battalion, commanded by Lieutenant-colonel Horatio Berney-Ficklin. At that time, it was based in Palestine and served during the Arab revolt.

On 1 August 1938, Urquhart was promoted to major. He was then dispatched to India as a staff officer, and in May 1939 became the deputy assistant quartermaster-general to Army HQ, India.

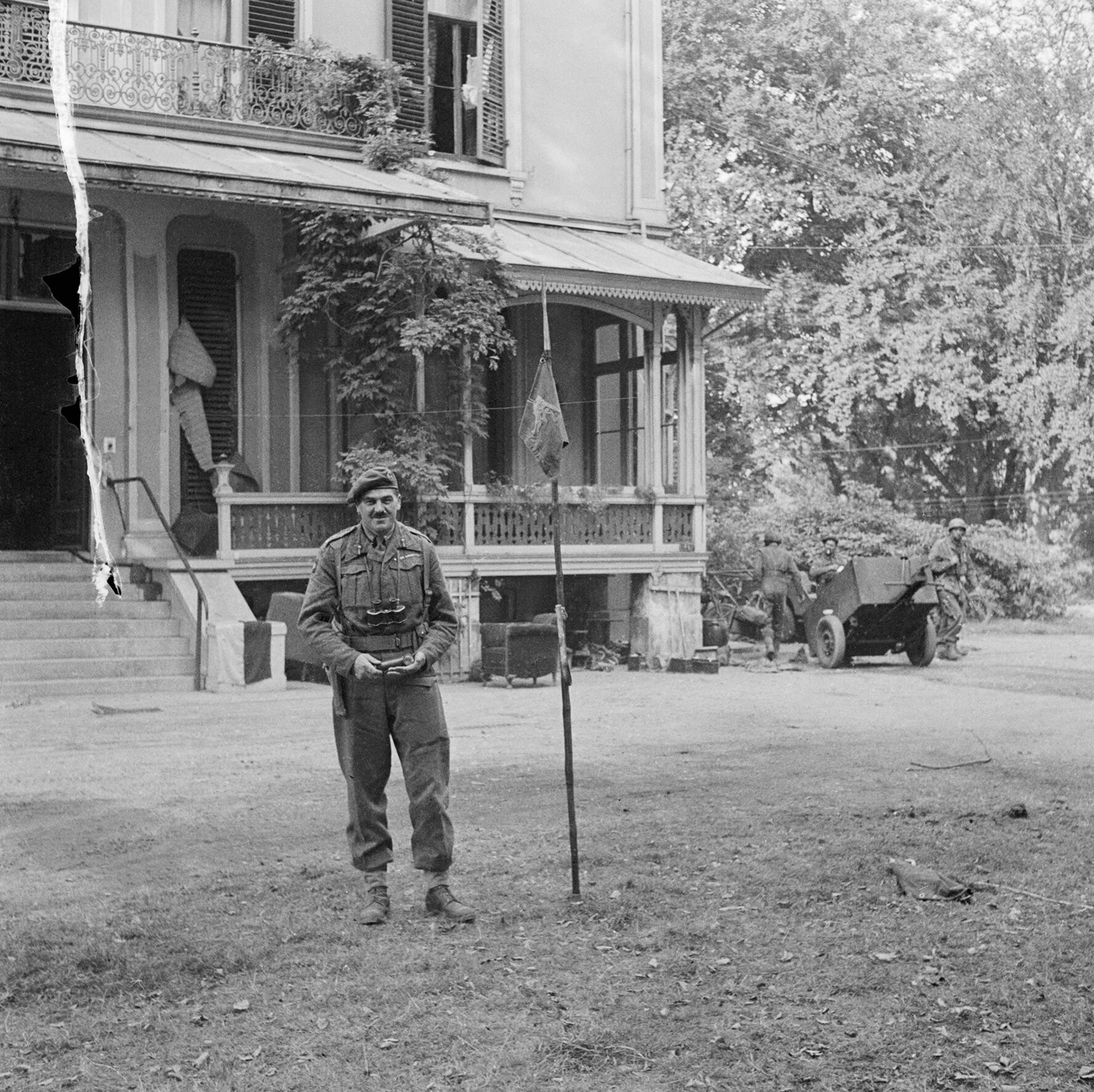
Major-general Roy Urquhart standing outside his headquarters during Operation Market Garden, September 1944

== Second World War ==
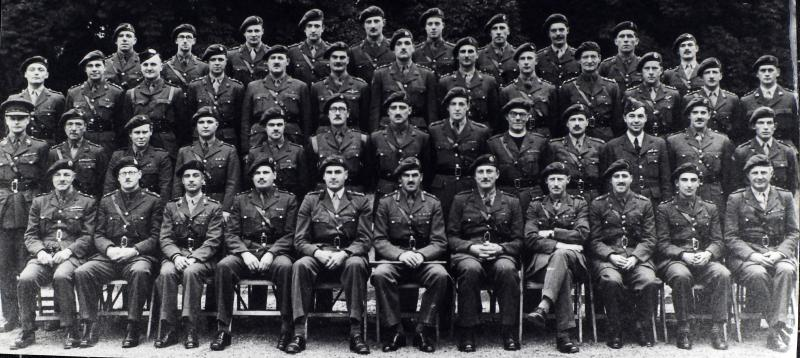
Group photograph of senior officers of the 1st Airborne Division, sometime in 1944. Sat in the centre of the front row is the division's GOC, Major-General Roy Urquhart.

When the Second World War broke out in September 1939, Urquhart was still serving in India. He remained there until 1941, when he was posted to North Africa. He was then sent back to the United Kingdom, as a staff officer in the 3rd Infantry Division. Thereafter, his career accelerated. Between 1941 and 1942 he was promoted to lieutenant-colonel, and commanded the 2nd Battalion, Duke of Cornwall's Light Infantry until 1942. Then he was appointed as a staff officer in the 51st (Highland) Infantry Division, which was then stationed in the United Kingdom before moving to North Africa in mid-1942. For a short time, after being promoted to brigadier, he commanded the 231st Infantry Brigade, which saw action during the Allied invasion of Sicily and in the early stages of the Italian Campaign. He then returned to England.

=== Arnhem ===
On return, he was assigned to XII Corps as a staff officer. In 1944, he was given command of the 1st Airborne Division. Urquhart was prone to airsickness, and had not commanded or been a member of an airborne formation. Although a newcomer, Urquhart commanded his division during Operation Market Garden in September 1944. The division was dropped into Arnhem, Netherlands, in an attempt to secure a crossing over the River Rhine. For nine days Urquhart's division fought unsupported against armoured units of II SS Panzer Corps and suffered increasingly heavy casualties during the Battle of Arnhem. He has faced some post-war criticism for exposing himself unnecessarily while personally scouting the battlefield, 1.5 km west of the bridge, encountered German fire and being forced to hide in a house for almost 2 days, absent from command during the critical phase of the battle, from Sunday 17 September evening to Tuesday 19th September morning.

On 25 September, the remnants of the division withdrew across the Rhine. During the battle, the 1st Airborne Division had lost over three-quarters of its strength. Shattered as a fighting formation, the division was withdrawn to the United Kingdom and saw no further action in the war. Urquhart was awarded the Dutch Bronze Lion.

=== Norway ===
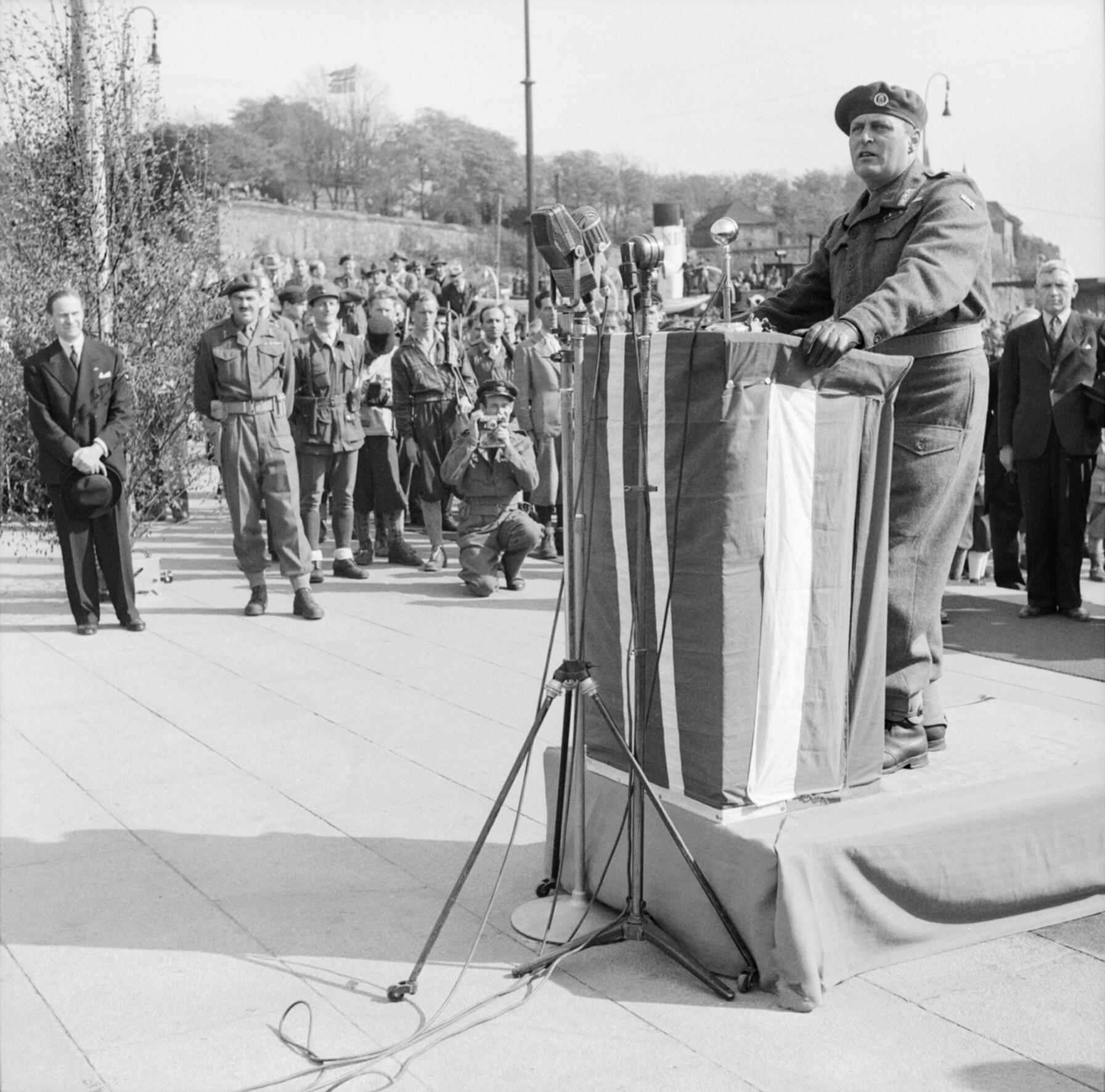
Crown Prince Olav in battle-dress addressing the welcoming crowd on the quayside at Oslo following his journey home on a British destroyer, accompanied by Major-General R. E. Urquhart, GOC 1st Airborne Division.

In May 1945, following the German surrender, Urquhart led the 1st Airborne Division, as the advanced guard of Force 134, during Operation Doomsday, the Allied reoccupation of Norway. He was charged with supervising the surrender of the German forces, as well as preventing the sabotage of vital military and civilian facilities. Due to delays in troop arrivals, Urquhart ended up driving into Oslo in a captured German staff car, accompanied only by four military policemen and two infantry platoons. Until the arrival of the Headquarters of Allied Forces, Norway, Urquhart had complete control over all Norwegian activities. As a result, Urquhart welcomed Crown Prince Olaf of Norway, and three ministers representing the Norwegian Government, when they arrived on a Royal Navy cruiser. General Sir Andrew Thorne arrived on 13 May, and assumed command of Allied forces. At the end of August, the 1st Airborne Division and Urquhart returned to the United Kingdom where his division was disbanded in November. Urquhart was awarded the Norwegian Order of St. Olav, for his role in the liberation of the country.

== Post-war service ==
After the war, Urquhart became director of the Territorial Army and Army Cadet Force at the War Office. He was then made general officer commanding, of the newly raised Territorial Army 16th Airborne Division in 1947. This was followed by command of the 51st/52nd Scottish Division until 1950. He was subsequently appointed as the general officer commanding Malaya Command during the Malayan Emergency and GOC-in-C British Troops in Austria. He retired from the army in 1955.

== Later life ==
After leaving the army, Urquhart became an executive in the heavy engineering industry, and retired in 1970. Urquhart was portrayed by Sean Connery in the 1977 film A Bridge Too Far, for which he himself served as a military consultant.

Urquhart and his wife Pamela had four children, among them Elspeth Campbell (wife of the former leader of the Liberal Democrats Menzies Campbell) and Suki Urquhart, author of The Scottish Gardener, third wife of Keith Schellenberg. In his memoirs, Campbell wrote that Urquhart told Elspeth's first husband, Philip Grant-Suttie, "there's no need to be formal; just call me General", and that he also insisted on tasting all the food and champagne for Elspeth and Menzies' wedding before paying for it.

Urquhart died on 13 December 1988, aged 87.

== In popular culture ==
In the 1977 film, A Bridge Too Far, Urquhart is portrayed by actor Sean Connery.

== Works ==
- Urquhart, Roy (1958). Arnhem: Britain's Infamous Airborne Assault of World War II. Royal Publishing Company. ISBN 0-9644704-3-8.

== Bibliography ==
- Dover, Major Victor (1981). The Sky Generals. Cassell. ISBN 0-304-30480-8.
- Mead, Richard (2007). Churchill's Lions: a biographical guide to the key British generals of World War II. Stroud (UK): Spellmount. ISBN 978-1-86227-431-0.
- Smart, Nick (2005). Biographical Dictionary of British Generals of the Second World War. Barnesley: Pen & Sword. ISBN 1844150496.
- Urquhart, Judy (2020). Memoir of a Major General's Daughter: From the second world war to the 60's social war. Judy Urquhart. ISBN 979-8653378843.

Military offices
Preceded by Ernest Down	GOC 1st Airborne Division; 1944–1945	Succeeded by Post disbanded
Preceded by New post	GOC 16th Airborne Division; 1947–1948	Succeeded by Gerald Lathbury
Preceded by Edmund Hakewill-Smith	GOC 51st/52nd Scottish Division; 1948–1950	Succeeded by George Inglis
Preceded by Sir Charles Boucher	GOC Malaya; 1950–1952	Succeeded by Sir Hugh Stockwell
Preceded by Sir Michael West	GOC-in-C British Troops in Austria; 1952–1955	Succeeded by Post disbanded
Honorary titles
Preceded by Alexander Telfer-Smollett	Colonel of the Highland Light Infantry; 1954–1957	Succeeded by Richard Davis
