= North East Fife (UK Parliament constituency) =

UK Parliament constituency (since 1983)

Coordinates: 56°18′57″N 2°57′55″W

- County constituency for the House of Commons
- Location within Scotland
- Electorate: 70,452 (March 2020)
- Major settlements: St Andrews, Cupar, Leuchars, Leven

Current constituency
- Created: 1983
- Member of Parliament: Wendy Chamberlain (Liberal Democrats)
- Created from: East Fife

North East Fife is a county constituency in Fife, Scotland, represented in the House of Commons of the UK Parliament by Wendy Chamberlain of the Liberal Democrats since the 2019 general election.

== History ==
The seat was created in 1983, and was held by the Conservative Party for four years, before being represented by Menzies Campbell from 1987 to 2015. Campbell was elected as a member of the Liberal Party, which later merged with the Social Democratic Party to form the Liberal Democrats. At the 2015 general election, the seat was gained by Stephen Gethins of the Scottish National Party (SNP). Gethins held his seat at the 2017 general election by just two votes over Elizabeth Riches of the Liberal Democrats, making the seat the most marginal in the United Kingdom. At the 2019 general election, Wendy Chamberlain defeated Gethins to regain the seat for the Liberal Democrats, making it the SNP's only loss that year. Although boundary changes meant that it was estimated that it would have been held by the SNP in 2019, Chamberlain held the revised seat with a much increased majority, making it a notional gain for the Liberal Democrats.

== Boundaries ==
Map of boundaries 2005–2024

1983–2005: North East Fife District.

2005–2024: Under the Fifth Review of UK Parliament constituencies, the constituency was expanded slightly to include part of the town of Leven. It was defined as comprising the area of the Fife Council other than those parts in the constituencies of Dunfermline and West Fife, Glenrothes, and Kirkcaldy and Cowdenbeath.

2024–present: Under the 2023 review of Westminster constituencies which came into effect for the 2024 general election, the constituency contains the following wards of Fife Council:

- Howe of Fife and Tay Coast, Tay Bridgehead, St Andrews, East Neuk and Landward, Cupar, and Leven, Kennoway and Largo.

As a result of the boundary review, Kennoway, Windygates and rest of Leven were transferred from Glenrothes (renamed Glenrothes and Mid Fife).

North East Fife constituency is in the region of Fife in Scotland. Fife has the River Tay on its northern coast, and the Firth of Forth to the south. The famous golf and university town of St Andrews is the major settlement in the seat. Others include Cupar, Leuchars, Newport-on-Tay, Newburgh, Auchtermuchty, Anstruther and Leven.

== Members of Parliament ==
Election	Member	Party
1983	Barry Henderson	Conservative
1987	Menzies Campbell	Liberal
1988	Menzies Campbell	Liberal Democrats
2015	Stephen Gethins	SNP
2019	Wendy Chamberlain	Liberal Democrats

== Election results ==
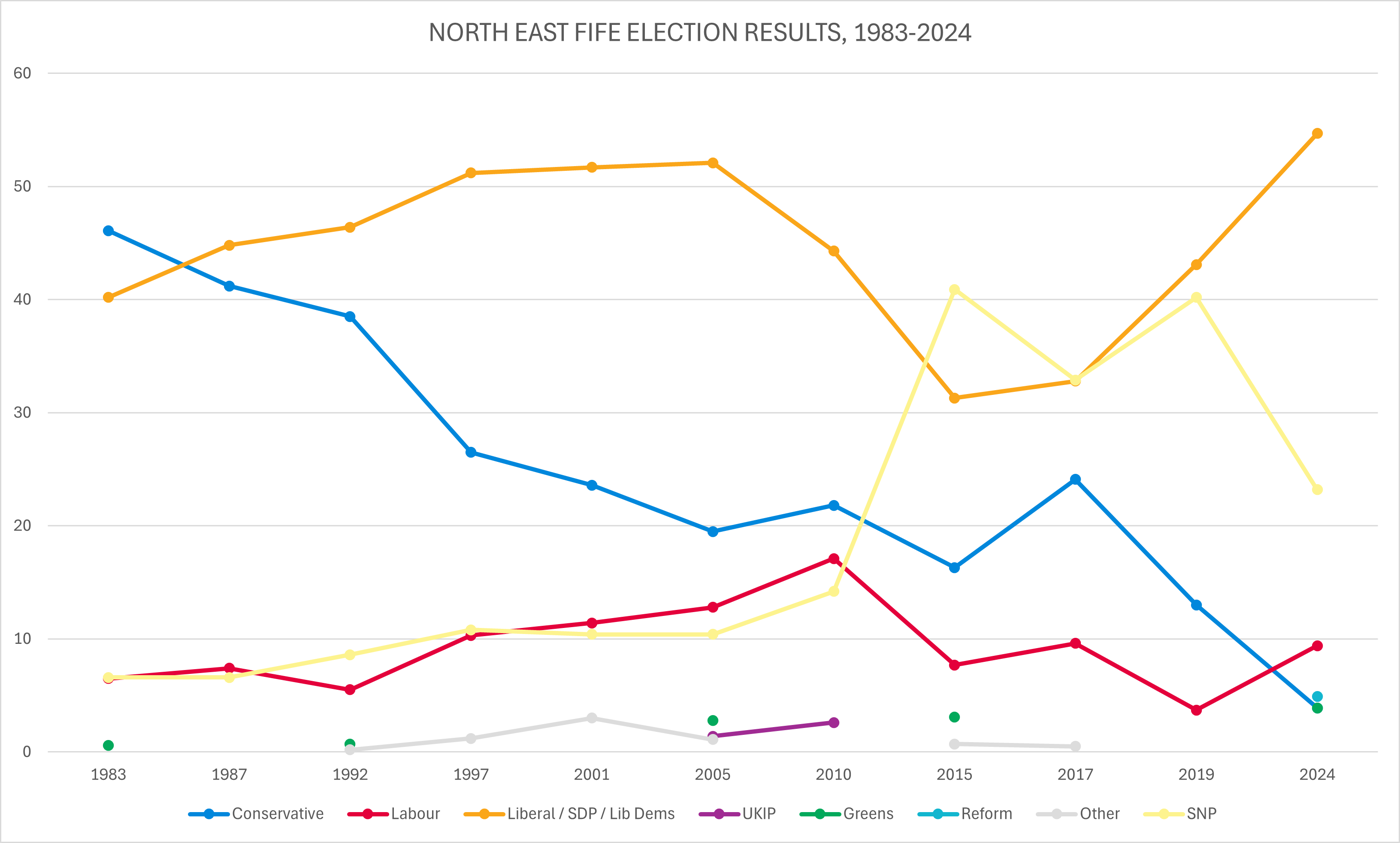
Election results 1983-2024

=== Elections in the 2020s ===
General election 2024: North East Fife
Party	Candidate	Votes	%	±%
Liberal Democrats	Wendy Chamberlain	23,384	54.7	+15.1
SNP	Stefan Hoggan-Radu	9,905	23.2	−17.8
Labour	Jennifer Gallagher	4,026	9.4	+3.9
Reform	Corey Chambers	2,094	4.9	+4.5
Conservative	Bill Bowman	1,666	3.9	−9.8
Green	Morven Ovenstone-Jones	1,653	3.9	New
Majority		13,479	31.5	+28.6
Turnout		42,728	61.5	−13.8
Liberal Democrats gain from SNP		Swing	+16.5	

On the notional boundaries of the 2019 general election the seat is an SNP hold; the Liberal Democrats therefore gain the seat despite previously holding it.

=== Elections in the 2010s ===
2019 notional result (Note: Estimate of the 2019 general election result as if the revised boundaries recommended under the 2023 boundary review were in place)
Party	Vote	%
SNP	21,371	41.0
Liberal Democrats	20,643	39.6
Conservative	7,126	13.7
Labour	2,859	5.5
Brexit Party	184	0.4
Majority	728	1.4
Turnout	52,183	74.1
Electorate	70,452	

General election 2019: North East Fife
Party	Candidate	Votes	%	±%
Liberal Democrats	Wendy Chamberlain	19,763	43.1	+10.2
SNP	Stephen Gethins	18,447	40.2	+7.3
Conservative	Tony Miklinski	5,961	13.0	−11.1
Labour	Wendy Haynes	1,707	3.7	−5.9
Majority		1,316	2.9	N/A
Turnout		45,878	75.3	+4.0
Liberal Democrats gain from SNP		Swing	+1.5	

North East Fife was notable in several respects in the 2019 general election: it was the SNP's only loss of the election, had the largest decrease in vote share for the Conservative Party (after the special case of Chorley, where the party did not stand) and also had the smallest Labour share of the vote in the United Kingdom, at 3.7% (again excluding Chorley, where the party did not stand). The seat went from the most marginal seat at the 2017 general election to the fortieth most marginal in 2019 (measured by percentage majority). When measured by absolute majority, North East Fife was the second most marginal Lib Dem-held seat at the election (after Caithness, Sutherland and Easter Ross).

General election 2017: North East Fife
Party	Candidate	Votes	%	±%
SNP	Stephen Gethins	13,743	32.86	−8.0
Liberal Democrats	Elizabeth Riches	13,741	32.85	+1.6
Conservative	Tony Miklinski	10,088	24.1	+7.8
Labour	Rosalind Garton	4,026	9.6	+1.9
Independent Sovereign Democratic Britain	Mike Scott-Hayward	224	0.5	−0.2
Majority		2	0.01	−9.6
Turnout		41,822	71.3	−1.7
SNP hold		Swing	−4.8	

North East Fife was the most marginal result in the country at the 2017 general election, with incumbent SNP MP Stephen Gethins seeing his majority cut from 4,344 votes (9.6%) to 2 votes (0.004%) ahead of the Liberal Democrat candidate, Elizabeth Riches. An alike result in Winchester at the 1997 general election was adjudicated and declared void and resulted in a legislative change in party naming rules (the Registration of Political Parties Act 1998).

General election 2015: North East Fife
Party	Candidate	Votes	%	±%
SNP	Stephen Gethins	18,523	40.9	+26.7
Liberal Democrats	Tim Brett	14,179	31.3	−13.0
Conservative	Huw Bell	7,373	16.3	−5.5
Labour	Brian Thomson	3,476	7.7	−9.4
Green	Andrew Collins	1,387	3.1	New
Independent	Mike Scott-Hayward	325	0.7	−1.9
Majority		4,344	9.6	N/A
Turnout		45,263	73.0	+6.4
SNP gain from Liberal Democrats		Swing	+19.9	

General election 2010: North East Fife
Party	Candidate	Votes	%	±%
Liberal Democrats	Menzies Campbell	17,763	44.3	−7.8
Conservative	Miles Briggs	8,715	21.8	+2.3
Labour	Mark Hood	6,869	17.1	+4.3
SNP	Roderick Campbell	5,685	14.2	+3.8
UKIP	Mike Scott-Hayward	1,032	2.6	+1.2
Majority		9,048	22.5	−10.1
Turnout		40,064	63.6	+1.5
Liberal Democrats hold		Swing	−5.0	

=== Elections in the 2000s ===
In 2005 the ward of Leven East was incorporated into this constituency from what was Central Fife.

General election 2005: North East Fife (new boundaries)
Party	Candidate	Votes	%	±%
Liberal Democrats	Menzies Campbell	20,088	52.1	+3.0
Conservative	Mike Scott-Hayward	7,517	19.5	−3.4
Labour	Tony King	4,920	12.8	−1.6
SNP	Roderick Campbell	4,011	10.4	−0.3
Green	James Park	1,071	2.8	New
UKIP	Duncan Pickard	533	1.4	New
Scottish Socialist	Jack Ferguson	416	1.1	−0.7
Majority		12,571	32.6	N/A
Turnout		38,556	62.1	N/A
Liberal Democrats win (new boundaries)				

General election 2001: North East Fife
Party	Candidate	Votes	%	±%
Liberal Democrats	Menzies Campbell	17,926	51.7	+0.5
Conservative	Mike Scott-Hayward	8,190	23.6	−2.9
Labour	Claire Brennan	3,950	11.4	+1.1
SNP	Kris Murray-Browne	3,596	10.4	−0.4
Scottish Socialist	Keith White	610	1.8	New
Legalise Cannabis	Leslie Von Goetz	420	1.2	New
Majority		9,736	28.1	+3.4
Turnout		34,692	56.0	−14.5
Liberal Democrats hold		Swing	+1.7	

=== Elections in the 1990s ===
General election 1997: North East Fife
Party	Candidate	Votes	%	±%
Liberal Democrats	Menzies Campbell	21,432	51.2	+4.8
Conservative	Adam Bruce	11,076	26.5	−12.0
SNP	Colin Welsh	4,545	10.8	+2.2
Labour	Charles Milne	4,301	10.3	+4.8
Referendum	William Stewart	485	1.2	New
Majority		10,356	24.7	+16.8
Turnout		41,839	70.5	−7.3
Liberal Democrats hold		Swing	+8.4	

General election 1992: North East Fife
Party	Candidate	Votes	%	±%
Liberal Democrats	Menzies Campbell	19,430	46.4	+1.6
Conservative	Mary Scanlon	16,122	38.5	−2.7
SNP	David Roche	3,589	8.6	+2.0
Labour	Lynda Clark	2,319	5.5	−1.9
Green	Tim Flynn	294	0.7	New
Liberal	David Senior	85	0.2	New
Majority		3,308	7.9	+4.3
Turnout		41,839	77.8	+1.6
Liberal Democrats hold		Swing	+2.1	

=== Elections in the 1980s ===
General election 1987: North East Fife
Party	Candidate	Votes	%	±%
Liberal	Menzies Campbell	17,868	44.8	+4.6
Conservative	Barry Henderson	16,421	41.2	−4.9
Labour	Anthony Michael Edward Gannon	2,947	7.4	+0.9
SNP	Francis David Roche	2,616	6.6	±0.0
Majority		1,447	3.6	N/A
Turnout		39,852	76.2	+2.5
Liberal gain from Conservative		Swing	+4.8	

General election 1983: North East Fife
Party	Candidate	Votes	%	±%
Conservative	Barry Henderson	17,129	46.1	−2.2
Liberal	Menzies Campbell	14,944	40.2	+14.0
SNP	John Hulbert	2,442	6.6	−6.6
Labour	David Caldwell	2,429	6.5	−5.8
Ecology	Timothy Flinn	242	0.6	New
Majority		2,185	5.9	−14.1
Turnout		37,186	73.7	−5.3
Conservative win (new seat)				

- Preceded by East Fife

== See also ==
- East Fife Constituency
