= Menzies Campbell =

Scottish politician (1941–2025)

The Right Honourable The Lord Campbell of Pittenweem CH CBE PC KC
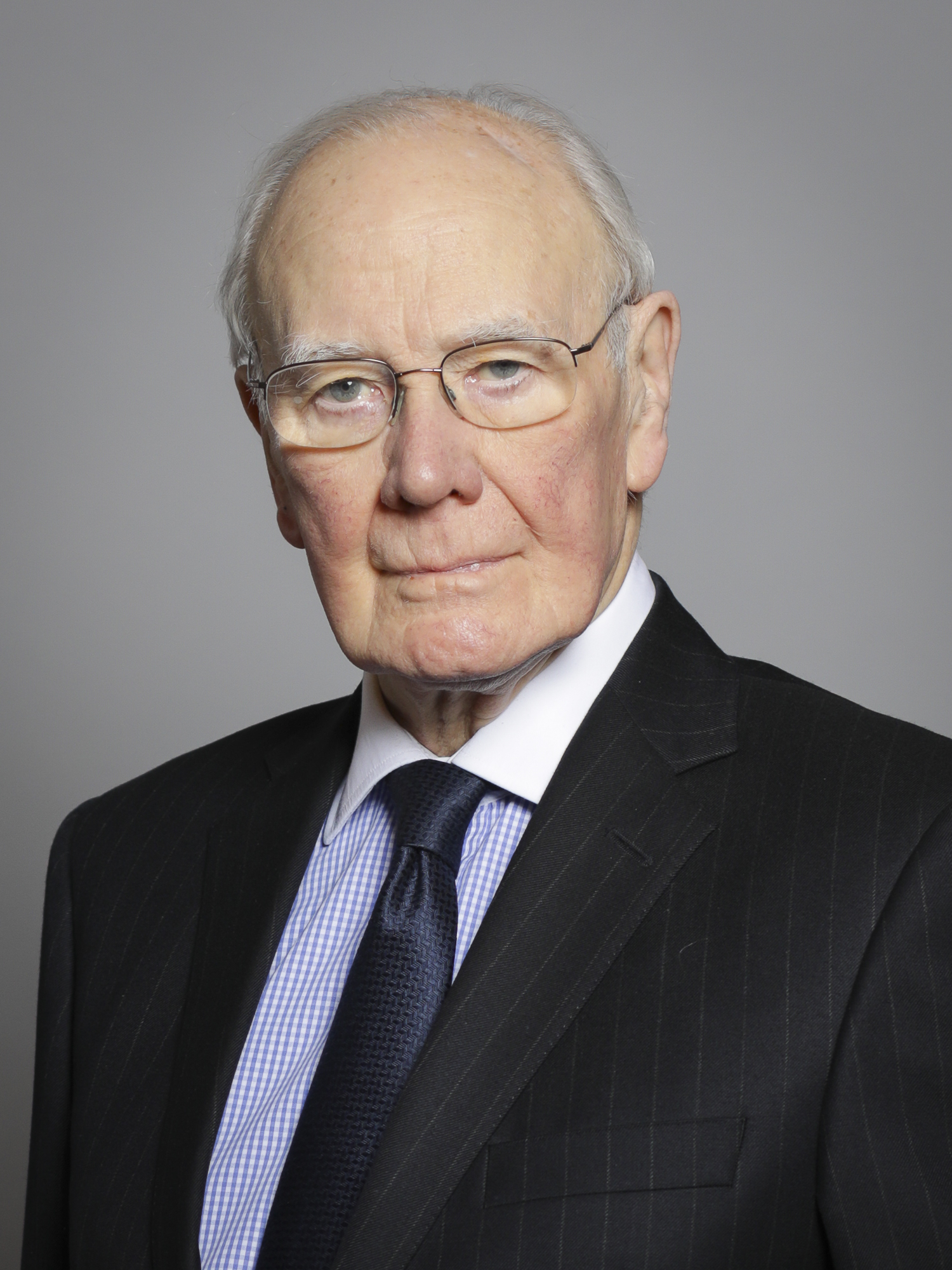
- Official portrait, 2019

Leader of the Liberal Democrats
- In office 2 March 2006 – 15 October 2007 (Note: Campbell served as acting leader from 7 January to 2 March 2006 following the resignation of Charles Kennedy.)
- Deputy: Vince Cable
- Preceded by: Charles Kennedy
- Succeeded by: Nick Clegg (Note: Vince Cable acted from 15 October 2007 to 18 December 2007.)

Chancellor of the University of St Andrews
- In office 9 January 2006 – 26 September 2025
- Vice-Chancellor: Brian Lang; Louise Richardson; Sally Mapstone
- Preceded by: Kenneth Dover
- Succeeded by: Anne Pringle

Deputy Leader of the Liberal Democrats
- In office 12 February 2003 – 2 March 2006
- Leader: Charles Kennedy; Himself (acting)
- Preceded by: Alan Beith
- Succeeded by: Vince Cable

Liberal Democrats spokesperson
- 1992–2006: Foreign Affairs
- 2017–2019: Defence
Parliamentary offices
Member of the House of Lords
Lord Temporal
Life peerage 13 October 2015 – 26 September 2025
Member of Parliament for North East Fife
In office 11 June 1987 – 30 March 2015
Preceded by	Barry Henderson
Succeeded by	Stephen Gethins

Personal details
- Born: Walter Menzies Campbell; 22 May 1941 Glasgow, Scotland
- Died: 26 September 2025 (aged 84) London, England
- Party: Liberal (until 1988); Liberal Democrats (from 1988)
- Spouse: Elspeth Urquhart (m. 1970; died 2023)
- Education: University of Glasgow; Stanford University
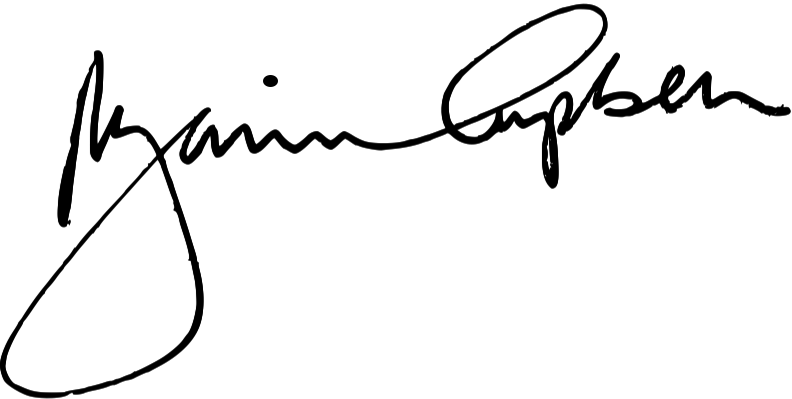
- Signature
- Website: Official website

Sports career
Medal record
Men's athletics
Representing Great Britain
Summer Universiade
Gold medal – first place	1963 Porto Alegre	4 x 400 m
Silver medal – second place	1967 Tokyo	200 m
Silver medal – second place	1967 Tokyo	4 x 400 m
Bronze medal – third place	1961 Sofia	4 x 400 m
Bronze medal – third place	1965 Budapest	200 m
Bronze medal – third place	1967 Tokyo	4 x 100 m

Walter Menzies "Ming" Campbell, Baron Campbell of Pittenweem (Note: CH, CBE, PC, KC) (/ˈmɪŋɪs/; 22 May 1941 – 26 September 2025), was a British politician, advocate and athlete. A senior figure in the Liberal Democrats, he served as Member of Parliament (MP) for North East Fife from 1987 to 2015 and led the party from 2006 to 2007. He held prominent frontbench roles in foreign affairs and defence, and was deputy leader under Charles Kennedy.

Before entering politics, Campbell was a distinguished sprinter, captaining the Great Britain athletics team in the mid-1960s and holding the British 100 metres record from 1967 to 1974. He studied law at the University of Glasgow and Stanford University, and was called to the Scottish Bar, later becoming Queen's Counsel.

Campbell was appointed Chancellor of the University of St Andrews in 2006 and made a life peer in 2015, serving in both roles until his death in 2025.

== Education and early career ==
Born in Glasgow on 22 May 1941, Campbell was educated at Hillhead High School and the University of Glasgow, from where he graduated with a Scottish Master of Arts (MA) in 1962 and a Bachelor of Laws (LLB) in 1965. He was elected President of the Glasgow University Liberal Club in 1962, and of the Glasgow University Union for 1964–65. He later undertook postgraduate study in international law at Stanford University in the US state of California before being called to the Scottish Bar in 1968. He was appointed Queen's Counsel in 1984, and became King's Counsel following the accession of King Charles III.

== Athletics career ==
He was a sprinter at university and he broke Olympic gold medalist Wyndham Halswelle's 53-year-old Scottish 300 yards record in 1961. Campbell competed for the Great Britain team in the 200 metres and 4×100 metres relay at the 1964 Olympic Games in Tokyo, and captained the Scotland team at the 1966 British Empire and Commonwealth Games in Kingston, Jamaica. He also captained the Great Britain athletics team in 1965 and 1966, and held the British 100 metres record from 1967 to 1974. At one time he was known as "the fastest white man on the planet", running the 100 metres in 10.2 seconds twice during 1967. In his first 10.2-second race he beat O. J. Simpson, who was then an aspiring athlete.

Campbell was twice the British 220 yards champion after winning the British AAA Championships title at the 1964 AAA Championships and 1967 AAA Championships.

== Political career ==
Campbell first stood for the Scottish Liberal Party at the February 1974 general election, in the Greenock and Port Glasgow constituency, where he finished second of five candidates, with 20.6% of the vote. He stood again in the same constituency at the subsequent general election in October 1974, dropping to third of four candidates, with 19.4% of the vote.

In the 1979 general election, Campbell stood in the East Fife constituency, coming second of four candidates with 23% of the vote. He stood in the seat's successor constituency, North East Fife, at the 1983 general election, coming second of five candidates with 40.2% of the vote, a 16.2% swing to the Liberal Party from the Scottish Conservatives. Four years later, at the 1987 general election, Campbell defeated the incumbent Conservative MP Barry Henderson to win the seat with 44.8% of the vote, going on to hold the seat at every general election until his retirement in 2015.

=== Member of Parliament ===
==== Liberal Democrats frontbenches ====
As foreign affairs spokesperson, Campbell was prominent in the Liberal Democrat opposition to the 2003 Iraq War, arguing that the British government should publish the Attorney General's secret advice on the war's legality and criticising Tony Blair's support for President George W. Bush. In 2004, Campbell set out his view of the Anglo-American relationship in the context of an unjust war: "For more than 60 years we have been engaged in an intimate and rewarding relationship with the United States. We must not allow our foreign policy to be defined by that relationship. We have to recognise that the World's most powerful English-speaking nation will always be a powerful influence upon us. Given what we share, it could hardly be otherwise. But a relationship with the United States based on the flawed principle, "my ally right or wrong" is not only profoundly illiberal but will be unsustainable as well."

==== Leader of the Liberal Democrats ====
On 7 January 2006, Campbell became interim leader following Charles Kennedy's resignation, before winning the subsequent leadership contest. On 2 March 2006, Campbell was declared leader after winning the leadership election under the alternative vote method. The first-round votes placed him in the lead, at 23,264 to Huhne's 16,691 and Simon Hughes's 12,081. Hughes was accordingly eliminated, and his second-preference votes were split between the two remaining candidates. The final result was Campbell at 29,697 and Chris Huhne at 21,628 on a 72% membership turnout.

Campbell promoted many younger MPs to his frontbench team including former MEP Nick Clegg as Home Affairs spokesperson and 26-year-old Jo Swinson as Scotland spokesperson.

===== Questions over leadership =====
Campbell's early performances at the weekly Prime Minister's Questions were criticised, leading him to declare himself "perfectly confident" that he could fulfil the role of party leader. Campbell regained some ground with the controversy over the US practice of "extraordinary rendition", the case of the NatWest Three, and the conflict in Lebanon.

According to polls published in July 2006, twice as many voters preferred Charles Kennedy as leader over Campbell, which led to further criticism of Campbell's leadership. However, Kennedy called rumours that he was considering challenging for the leadership as "fanciful".

In 2006, the University of St Andrews awarded an honorary doctorate of law to former president Mohammad Khatami of Iran, which sparked some criticism, although as chancellor he was only the titular head and not involved in such decisions. Khatami was elected as President of Iran in 1997 and 2001, both occasions on platforms of social and political reform and a "Dialogue Among Civilizations" that put Khatami significantly at odds with his conservative successor, Mahmoud Ahmadinejad.

Shortly before Gordon Brown took over as prime minister in June 2007, Campbell was invited to a meeting with the then Chancellor of the Exchequer. Brown surprised Campbell by requesting that two Liberal Democrats (Lord Ashdown and Lady Neuberger) join his cabinet. After taking 24 hours to consult and consider, Campbell rejected the offer as unworkable, given the gulf between the parties on issues of foreign policy and civil liberties. Labour leaked news of the meeting to the media and went behind Campbell to offer the job of Secretary of State for Northern Ireland to Ashdown anyway; who turned it down.

Following intense speculation in late 2007, Gordon Brown announced there would be no general election in 2007. Following this announcement, Campbell's leadership again came under question, with some in the party feeling that now the heat was off the time was ripe to get a younger leader potentially more capable of connecting with voters. On 15 October, Campbell's deputy Vince Cable conceded on BBC Radio 4's The World at One programme that Campbell's position was "certainly under discussion", adding "I don't think it's under threat", but on the same programme party stalwart Sir Chris Clarke advised Campbell to "go with dignity and go back to being foreign affairs spokesman, where the world listens to you". Later the same day came an announcement by the party that Campbell would step down as leader.

===== Resignation of leadership =====
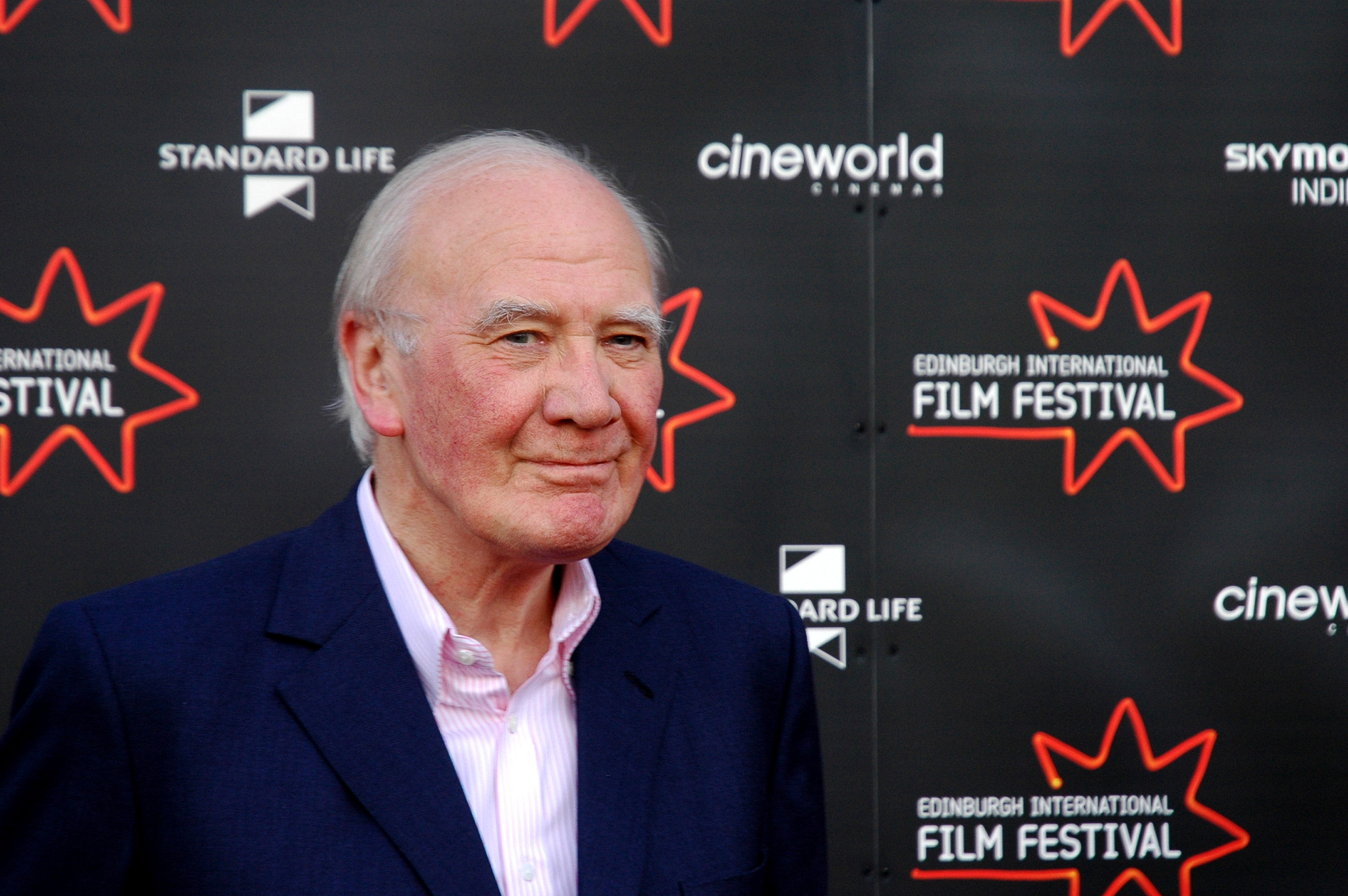
Campbell at the Edinburgh International Film Festival in 2007

Campbell resigned as leader of the Liberal Democrats on 15 October 2007. The announcement was made from the steps of Cowley Street by Party President Simon Hughes. Alongside him was deputy Leader Vince Cable; they praised Campbell's leadership and said the party owed him a debt of gratitude. In his letter of resignation, addressed to Hughes, Campbell stated, "It has become clear that following the Prime Minister's decision not to hold an election, questions about leadership are getting in the way of further progress by the party".

Cable became acting leader of the Liberal Democrats until a leadership election could be held. Campbell became the first elected leader of the Liberal Democrats who left the leadership without ever leading the party to a general election. Following the resignation, a leadership contender, Nick Clegg, alleged that Campbell had been a victim of ageism throughout his term as party leader, saying he had been treated "appallingly" and subject to "barely disguised ageism"; his successor Clegg was over 25 years his junior.

Concerns about ageism directed at Campbell from the media had also been raised by the charity Age Concern in September 2006. Gordon Lishman, the director of the charity, said "the recent media coverage poking fun at Sir Menzies has brought to light the age discrimination that is epidemic in the media and society". Attacking media coverage that seemed to focus on his age, Lishman added "clearly the media needs to update its attitudes and get with the times; people are living and working longer and age discrimination is out dated".

==== Expenses claims ====
Campbell reportedly claimed around £10,000 over two years to redesign his flat in London, which included the purchasing of a king-sized bed, scatter cushions and a small flat screen television. It was also claimed that on occasions Campbell spent £800 a month on food. Campbell said he believed that the claims were "within the spirit and letter of the rules" as the flat had not been renovated for 20 years.

==== Retirement from the House of Commons ====
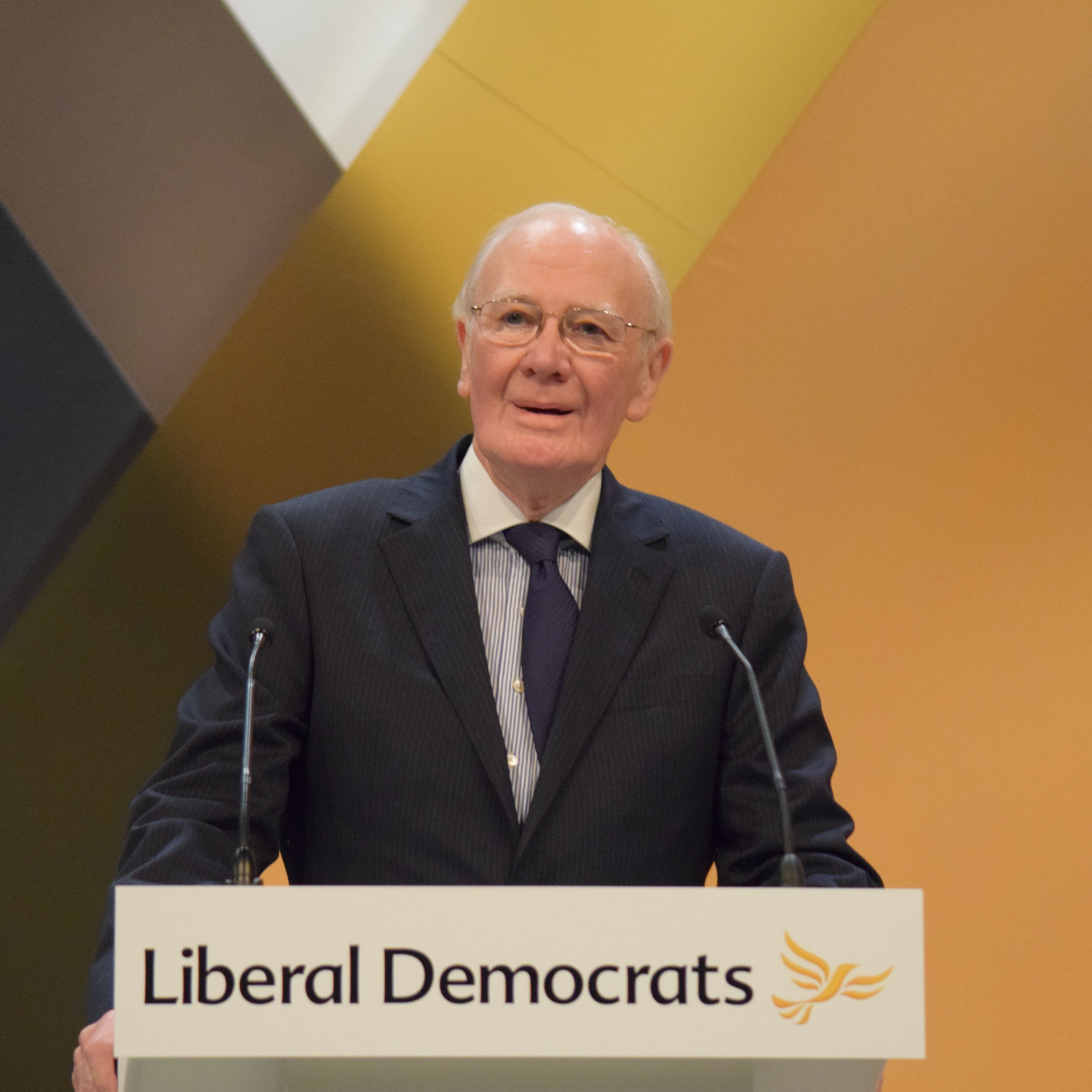
Campbell in 2018

On 9 October 2013, Campbell announced that he would stand down as a Member of Parliament at the 2015 general election. He said: "It is always a regret to begin the process of retiring from the House of Commons but I believe now is the time to start". Liberal Democrat Leader Nick Clegg paid tribute, saying Campbell "served this country and our party with unparalleled distinction".

There was speculation in 2013 that he would be offered a seat in the House of Lords – an opportunity in which, during an interview with Chat Politics, Campbell declared his interest. He became a life peer and a member of the House of Lords in October 2015. Campbell stated that he believed the House of Lords should be "mainly elected" and that he would continue to promote that idea "within the house itself."

== Political views ==
Campbell promoted policies to shift taxation away from "goods" such as employment and towards "bads" such as pollution through a revenue-neutral restructuring of the tax system that maintains the current tax burden whilst lifting two-million low-paid individuals out of income tax altogether.

Campbell's primary area of interest was acknowledged to be foreign policy. He strongly supported multilateral institutions such as the European Union and the United Nations but argued that the European Union must reform to become more democratic and the United Nations must develop new mechanisms for dealing with humanitarian crises.

He was critical of what he claimed as the "disproportionate military action" employed by the Israeli Defence Force in Gaza and in Lebanon, contending that Israel's tactics exacerbate existing tensions and lead to human rights abuses. Though a supporter of Anglo-American cooperation, Campbell argued that the Bush-Blair relationship was one-sided and that the Labour government pursued it at the expense of Britain's standing in other international institutions, particularly the EU and UN.

Campbell had stressed the need for the Liberal Democrats to provide extra support for female, disabled and ethnic minority candidates seeking to contest winnable seats.

In July 2007, Campbell unveiled tax proposals that amounted to a large shift in the tax burden away from low-income and middle-income earners and onto higher-earners and pollution. This was to be implemented by cutting the basic rate of income tax from 20% to 16%, closing £13.5 billion of tax loopholes for high-earners and imposing larger green taxes on polluters. Campbell said of the proposals that "the unacceptable reality is that in Britain today the poorest pay a higher proportion of their income in tax than the super-rich" and that his aim was for "the rich and people with environmentally damaging lifestyles to pay a fairer share".

Campbell was a member of the Top Level Group of UK Parliamentarians for Multilateral Nuclear Disarmament and Non-proliferation, established in October 2009.

In August 2018, Campbell spoke at a People's Vote rally in Edinburgh. People's Vote was a campaign group calling for a public vote on the final Brexit deal between the UK and the European Union.

== Personal life and death ==
Campbell married Elspeth, Lady Grant-Suttie, daughter of Major General Roy Urquhart and ex-wife of Sir Philip Grant-Suttie, 8th Baronet, in June 1970. The couple had no children, but she had a son from her first marriage. She died on 5 June 2023, aged 83.

Campbell died at a care facility in London on 26 September 2025, aged 84. Following his death, tributes were paid across political and academic communities, with the University of St Andrews lowering its flags to half-mast in his honour. Liberal Democrat leader Sir Ed Davey described him as "a true Liberal giant" and praised his "morality, courage and wisdom" in opposing the Iraq War. Scottish Liberal Democrat leader Alex Cole-Hamilton called him "my MP, my mentor and my friend", adding that "from the Olympic track to Westminster, his contribution will long be remembered." Scottish First Minister John Swinney described Campbell as "one of the most distinguished and well-liked political figures of his generation".

== Honours ==
Campbell was appointed Commander of the Order of the British Empire (CBE) in the 1987 New Year Honours; he became a Privy Counsellor in the 1999 New Year Honours; and he was knighted in the 2004 New Year Honours for services to Parliament, having the honour conferred by the Prince of Wales on 27 May 2004.

Campbell was appointed a Member of the Order of the Companions of Honour (CH) in the 2013 Birthday Honours for public and political service. He was nominated for a life peerage in the 2015 Dissolution Honours and created Baron Campbell of Pittenweem, of Pittenweem in the County of Fife, on 13 October 2015.

Campbell held honorary degrees from the University of Glasgow and the University of Strathclyde. He was the only person nominated to succeed Sir Kenneth Dover after he retired as Chancellor of the University of St Andrews on 1 January 2006, so took office immediately after nominations closed on 9 January 2006. He was installed as Chancellor on 22 April 2006, at which time he also received the honorary degree of Doctor of Laws.

In 2010 it was reported that Campbell had been considered for the post of High Commissioner to Australia; The Guardian claimed it had been stalled as it would have triggered a by-election in Campbell's constituency.

== Notes ==
Parliament of the United Kingdom
Preceded by Barry Henderson	Member of Parliament for North East Fife; 1987–2015	Succeeded by Stephen Gethins
Party political offices
Preceded by Russell Johnston	Leader of the Scottish Liberal Party; 1975–1977	Succeeded by Terry Grieve
New office	Liberal Democrat Spokesperson for Foreign Affairs; 1994–2006	Succeeded by Michael Moore
Preceded by Alan Beith	Deputy Leader of the Liberal Democrats; 2003–2006	Succeeded by Vince Cable
Preceded by Charles Kennedy	Leader of the Liberal Democrats; 2006–2007	Succeeded by Vince Cable
Preceded by The Baroness Jolly	Liberal Democrats Spokesperson for Defence; 2017–2025	Vacant
Academic offices
Preceded by Kenneth Dover	Chancellor of the University of St Andrews; 2006–2025	Succeeded by Dame Anne Pringle
