= Angela Harris, Baroness Harris of Richmond =

British life peer

The Right Honourable The Baroness Harris of Richmond DL
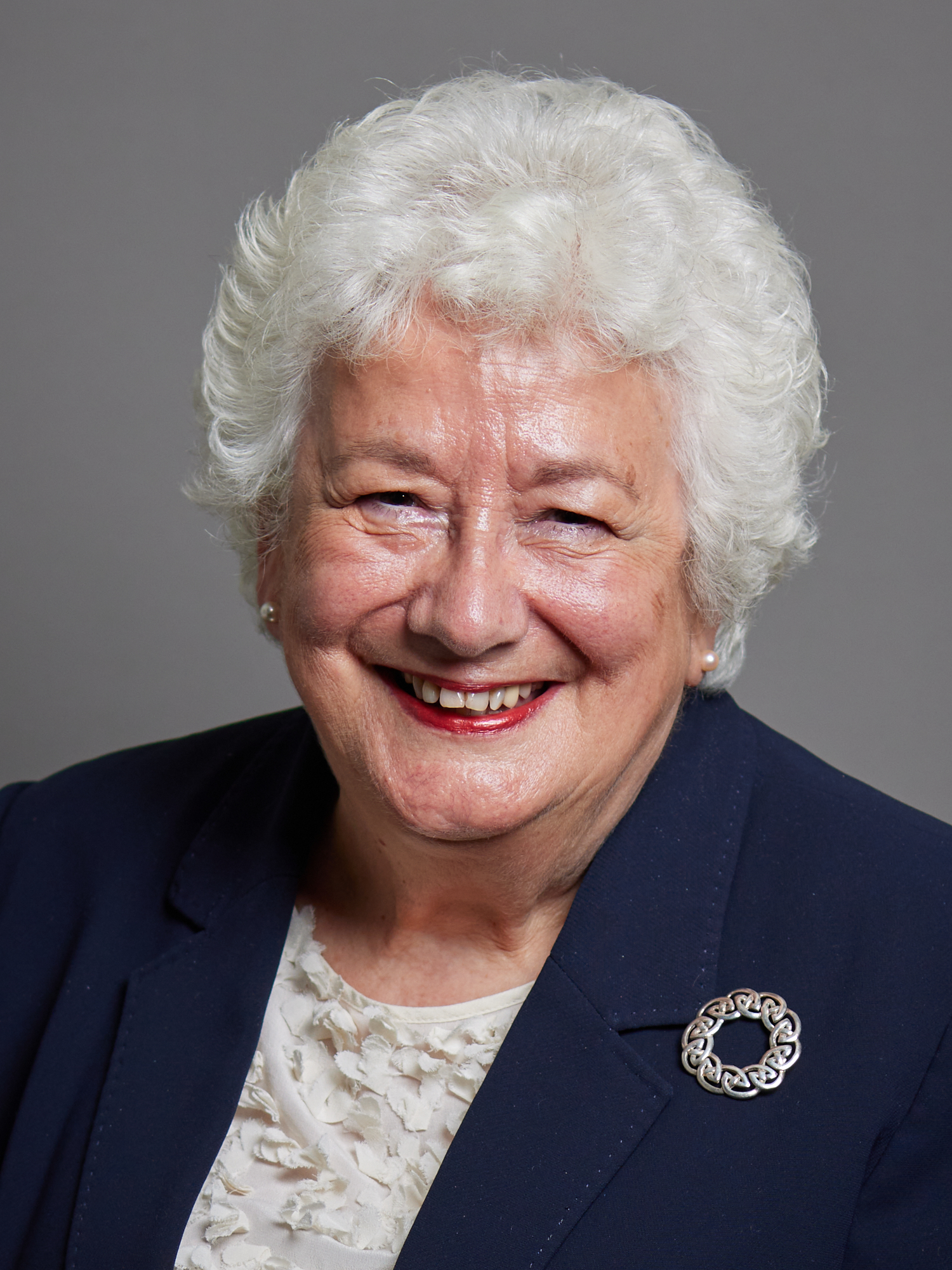
- Official portrait, 2022

Member of the House of Lords
- Lord Temporal
- Life peerage 6 August 1999

Personal details
- Born: Angela Felicity Richards; 4 January 1944 (age 82)
- Party: Liberal Democrat
- Spouse(s): (1) Philip Martin Bowles; (2) John Philip Roger Harris
- Children: 1
- Awards: Hon Doctorate from the University of Bradford

Angela Felicity Harris, Baroness Harris of Richmond, DL (born 4 January 1944) is a Liberal Democrat life peer and formerly a Deputy Speaker in the House of Lords of the United Kingdom.

== Biography ==
The daughter of Reverend George Hamilton Richards and Eva née Lindley, she was educated at Canon Slade Grammar School in Bolton and at Ealing Hotel and Catering College. Harris worked as an air stewardess prior to a career in local government. After moving to Richmond, North Yorkshire, she was elected to Richmond Town Council and Richmondshire District Council, serving as both mayor and chairman. She was elected to North Yorkshire County Council in 1981.

Angela Harris was a member of North Yorkshire County Council from 1981 to 2001 and the first woman to chair the authority in 1991/92. She also served as chair of the North Yorkshire Police Authority between 1994 and 2001 and was formerly joint chair (balanced council) for two years and deputy chair of the Association of Police Authorities between 1997 and 2001. Angela is also a former member of the Service Authority National Crime Squad and Police Negotiating Board. For 16 years from 1982 to 1998 Angela was a justice of the peace and chair of an advisory sub-committee. She was an NHS Trust non-executive Director (1990–1997). From 1994 to 2019 Angela Harris, was a Deputy Lieutenant of North Yorkshire and, from 1996, is a member of the Court of the University of York. She was awarded an honorary doctorate from the University of Bradford in 2020.

Angela Harris has acted as a former Party Chief Steward at Federal Conferences for the Liberal Democrats and was a candidate for the party in the 1999 European Parliament Elections.

On 6 August 1999 Angela Harris was created a Liberal Democrat Life Peer, taking the title Baroness Harris of Richmond, of Richmond in the County of North Yorkshire. Since being in the Lords, Angela has chaired European Union Select sub-Committee F and has been a member of the European Union Select Committee, Offices Committee and Refreshment Sub-Committee. She was a Deputy Speaker from 2008 to 2018. Between 2000 and 2008 she served as a Liberal Democrat Whip. And also from 2018 she continues to be a whip. She was party spokesperson on Northern Ireland and member of the Home Affairs Team for policing matters. She is a member of the Ecclesiastical Committee and also the Procedures and Privileges Committee in the House of Lords

== Interests ==
Angela Harris's special interests are the police and she was president of the National Association of Chaplains to the Police. She was patron of the UK Chapter of ASIS International (the organisation for security professionals, which has a global membership of 38,000) and was awarded the ASIS UK Mervyn David Award in 2012 for her services to the security profession. She is a former trustee of the Police Rehabilitation Centre, Flint House, and is now president of The Police Treatment Centres, She is patron of Herriot Hospice Homecare, a patron of Richmondshire Choral Society, a patron of the Richmondshire Museum, patron of Richmond 950, patron of CRACL (Catterick, Richmond and Colburn Libraries). She is a Companion of the Royal Air Force Regiment's SODC. She sits on the Advisory Board of the International Foundation for Protection Officers in the UK and Ireland.

Harris was appointed High Steward of Ripon Cathedral in 2009.

== Personal life ==
In 1976 she married for a second time, to John Philip Roger Harris. She has one son (Mark) from her first marriage, to Philip Martin Bowles.
