= List of projects supported by George Soros =

Hungarian-American businessman and philanthropist George Soros has funded a variety of political projects in recent years.

== Political organizations ==
=== Founded or helped to found ===
- Open Society Foundations
- New America

=== Supported ===
- Best for Britain
- European Movement UK
- Scientists for EU
- Media Matters for America
- Center for Public Integrity
- Priorities USA Action
- American Bridge 21st Century
- America Votes
- Millennium Promise
- Tides Center and Foundation
- Wikimedia Endowment
- MoveOn
- America Coming Together

== Studies ==
- Lancet surveys of Iraq War casualties
