= EMB =

EMB may refer to:

== Organizations ==
- Education and Manpower Bureau, now the Education Bureau, a government agency in Hong Kong
- Empire Marketing Board, a former British trade organization
- Evangelical Mennonite Brethren, now the Fellowship of Evangelical Bible Churches
- European Milk Board, a trade organization
- European Movement Belgium, the Belgian branch of the International European Movement
- Evangelische Michaelsbruderschaft, a German Lutheran religious brotherhood

== Science and technology ==
- Electromagnetic buoyancy
- Embraer, a Brazilian aerospace conglomerate
- Embreea, an orchid genus
- Eosin methylene blue, a selective stain for Gram-negative bacteria
- Ethambutol, a drug used to treat tuberculosis
- Louis Emberger (1897–1969), French botanist

== Other uses ==
- Embaloh language
- EMB or Embarcadero Plaza, formerly known as Justin Herman Plaza in San Francisco, a hotspot for street skateboarding in the early 1990s.
