= Andrew Adonis, Baron Adonis =

British politician and journalist (born 1963)

The Right Honourable The Lord Adonis PC
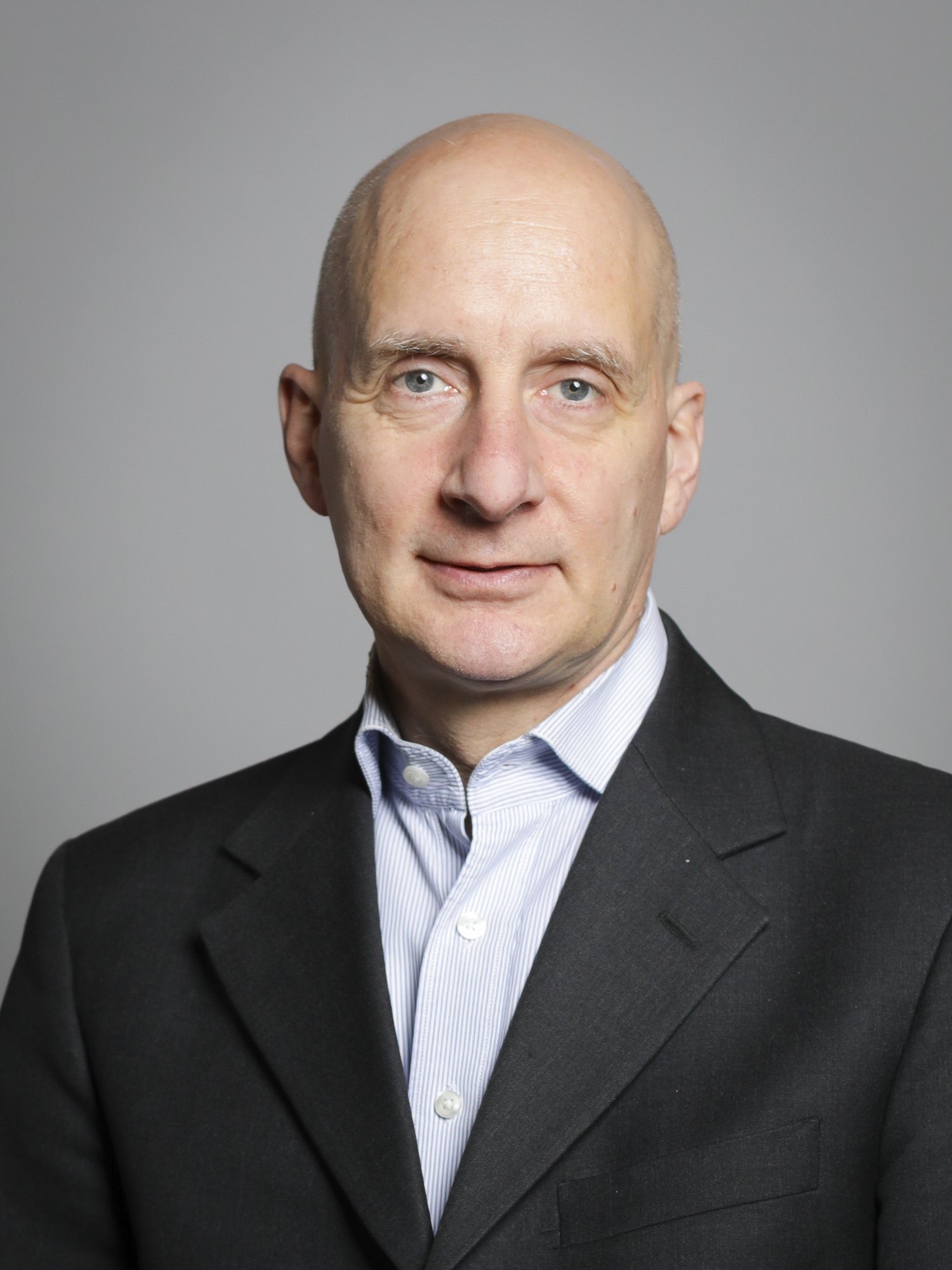
- Official portrait, 2019

Chairman of the European Movement
- In office 7 March 2021 – 14 December 2022
- President: The Lord Heseltine
- Vice President: The Lord Clarke of Nottingham; The Baroness Quin
- Preceded by: Stephen Dorrell
- Succeeded by: Mike Galsworthy

Vice Chairman of the European Movement
- In office 15 January 2019 – 7 March 2021
- President: The Lord Heseltine
- Vice President: The Lord Clarke of Nottingham; The Baroness Quin
- Preceded by: Richard Corbett
- Succeeded by: Richard Wilson

Secretary of State for Transport
- In office 5 June 2009 – 11 May 2010
- Prime Minister: Gordon Brown
- Preceded by: Geoff Hoon
- Succeeded by: Philip Hammond

Minister of State for Transport
- In office 3 October 2008 – 5 June 2009
- Prime Minister: Gordon Brown
- Preceded by: Rosie Winterton
- Succeeded by: Sadiq Khan

Parliamentary Under-Secretary of State for Schools and Learners
- In office 10 May 2005 – 3 October 2008
- Prime Minister: Tony Blair; Gordon Brown
- Preceded by: The Lord Filkin
- Succeeded by: Sarah McCarthy-Fry

Member of the House of Lords
- Lord Temporal
- Life peerage 16 May 2005

Personal details
- Born: Andreas Adonis; 22 February 1963 (age 63) Hampstead, London, England
- Party: Labour (1995–2015, since 2017)
- Other political affiliations: Liberal Democrats (1988–1995); SDP (1985–1988)
- Spouse: Kathryn Davies (m. 1994; div. 2015)
- Children: 2
- Education: Keble College, Oxford (BA); Christ Church, Oxford (DPhil)
- Profession: Journalist
- Website: Official website

Andrew Adonis, Baron Adonis, PC (born Andreas Adonis; 22 February 1963) is a British Labour Party politician and journalist who served in the UK Government for five years in the Blair ministry and the Brown ministry.

He served as Secretary of State for Transport from 2009 to 2010, and as Chairman of the National Infrastructure Commission from 2015 to 2017. He was Chair of the European Movement, from March 2021 until December 2022 having previously served as Vice-Chairman from 2019 to 2021. He is currently a columnist for The New European.

Adonis began his career as an academic at the University of Oxford, before becoming a journalist at the Financial Times and later The Observer. Adonis was appointed by Prime Minister Tony Blair to be an advisor at the Number 10 Policy Unit, specialising in constitutional and educational policy, in 1998. He was later promoted to become the Head of the Policy Unit from 2001 until being created a life peer in 2005, when he was appointed Minister of State for Education in HM Government. He remained in that role when Gordon Brown became Prime Minister in 2007, before becoming Minister of State for Transport in 2008. In 2009, he was promoted to the Cabinet as Transport Secretary, a position he held until 2010.

Adonis has worked for a number of think tanks, is a board member of Policy Network and is the author or co-author of several books, including several studies of the British class system, the rise and fall of the Community Charge, and the Victorian House of Lords. He has also co-edited a collection of essays on Roy Jenkins. Like Jenkins, Adonis speaks with rhotacism. His latest book, Ernest Bevin: Labour's Churchill, is a biography of the Labour politician Ernest Bevin whom, alongside Tony Blair, Adonis regards as a source of inspiration for the modern Labour Party.

Adonis is a strong supporter and advocate of the European Union (EU) and a vocal opponent of Brexit. Following the 2016 United Kingdom European Union membership referendum, he became a key campaigner against the result of the referendum on British departure from the EU, supporting the People's Vote.

== Family and education ==
Adonis's Greek Cypriot father, Nikos, emigrated from Cyprus as a teenager, becoming a waiter in London, where he met Adonis's English mother. His mother left the family when he was three, and she has had no communication with him since. Shortly thereafter Adonis and his sister were placed in care, because their father was working long hours and was not able to cope with sole parental responsibilities. Adonis lived in a council children's home until the age of 11, when he was awarded a local education authority grant to attend Kingham Hill School, a boarding school in Oxfordshire.

Adonis studied at Keble College, Oxford, where he graduated with a first-class Bachelor of Arts degree in Modern History in 1984. He pursued further studies at Oxford and undertook a Doctor of Philosophy (DPhil) degree at Christ Church, which he completed in 1988 with a thesis entitled The political role of the British peerage in the Third Reform Act system, c. 1885–1914. He was then elected a fellow in history and politics at Nuffield College.

From 1991 to 1996, Adonis was an education and industry correspondent at the Financial Times, eventually becoming their public policy editor. In 1996, he moved to The Observer to work as a political columnist, leader writer and editor.

== Early political career ==
From 1987 until 1991, Adonis served as an Oxford City Councillor for the Social Democratic Party (SDP) and later the Liberal Democrats, representing the North ward. In 1994, he was selected by the Liberal Democrats as their prospective parliamentary candidate for the Westbury constituency, but he resigned after 18 months. In the following year he joined the Labour Party.

During the mid-to-late 1990s he was politically active for Labour in Islington North, the constituency represented by Jeremy Corbyn, and was selected as Labour candidate to contest St George's Ward for Islington London Borough Council in 1998. He withdrew from the process before the election, however, upon being offered a position in the Number 10 Policy Unit as a constitutional and educational policy advisor in 1997. He remained in this role until 2001, when he was promoted to become Head of the Policy Unit.

On 16 May 2005, he was created a life peer as Baron Adonis, of Camden Town in the London Borough of Camden. This made it possible for him to serve as a government minister, representing it in the House of Lords.

== UK Government ==
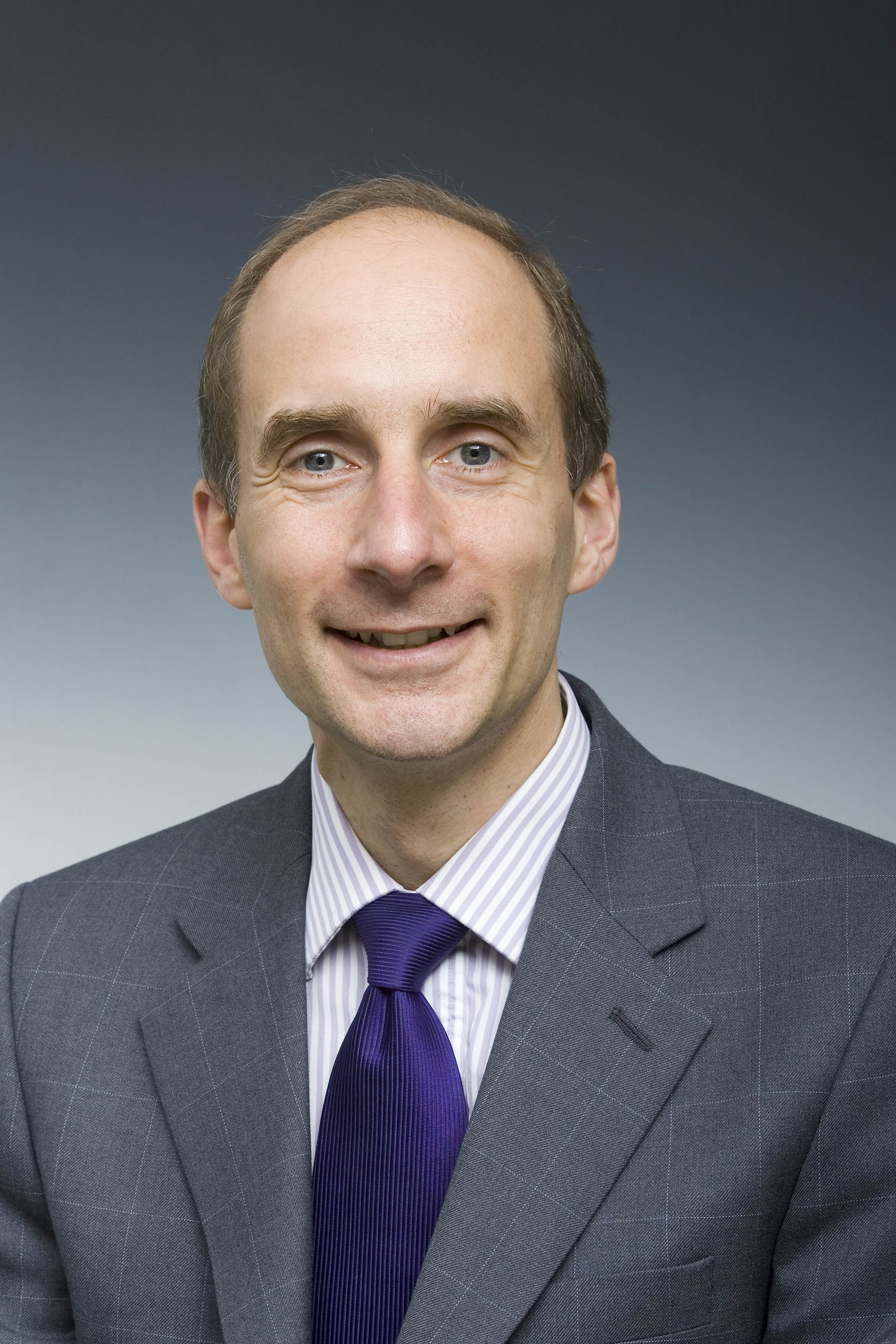
Official portrait, 2007

Lord Adonis became the Parliamentary Under-Secretary of State for Education in the Department for Education and Skills, which was later renamed the Department for Children, Schools and Families. He was closely involved in the London Challenge.

Having been the architect of the academies policy in the Policy Unit, Adonis was also able to be the driving force in Government behind the programme, which replaced failing and under-performing comprehensive schools with all-ability, independently managed academies, run on a not-for-profit basis. By the time he left the Department in October 2008, 133 academies were open and 300 more were in the pipeline. Research by the Department of Education suggests that performance at these early "sponsored" academies increased more quickly than in similar schools in the mainstream sector, however these figures do not take into account underlying factors which affect which schools are likely to become academies. Policies on academies by Adonis were praised by some opposition politicians, including the then Conservative education spokesman Michael Gove, who in 2008 said, "We are on the same page as Andrew Adonis."

He encouraged state schools to adopt practices of the private sector and generally believed in giving individual schools more independence and autonomy from central government and the local education authorities, although he voted against schools having more independent authority in the houses of parliament in 2006. His criticism of under-performing comprehensives made him unpopular with some trade union members and some on the Labour Party's left-wing. In 2006 Adonis supported the conversion of some independent schools under financial duress into state academies, portrayed at the time as a new style of direct grant grammar schools although not selective.

As Tony Blair's head of policy, Adonis was regarded as the architect of tuition fees in 2004 – a policy he criticised and disowned 13 years later.

Having initially kept his position when Gordon Brown became Prime Minister, Adonis was reshuffled to the Department for Transport on 3 October 2008, to become Minister of State. In May 2009, while reviewing potential cycle "super highways" with Kulveer Ranger and then-London Mayor Boris Johnson, the group had a narrow escape when a passing lorry's back door "suddenly flew open, dragged a parked car into the street and smashed into another – just feet from the group".

On 5 June 2009, Adonis was promoted to the Cabinet as Secretary of State for Transport and was sworn a member of the Privy Council. In this role, he pioneered the plan for High Speed 2, the proposed high-speed railway line from London to Birmingham and the north of England. The plan was published shortly before the 2010 election, and has since been adopted and taken forward by subsequent governments, with some changes to the proposed route. In July 2015, Adonis was appointed a non-executive director to HS2 Board Ltd.

Adonis planned and announced the electrification of the Great Western Main Line from London Paddington to Bristol, Cardiff and Swansea, and the electrification of lines in North West England from Manchester to Liverpool and Manchester to Preston. This electrification programme, except for the Cardiff to Swansea section of the Great Western, was taken forward by the coalition government.

Adonis was a key figure in the aftermath of the 2010 general election, which produced a hung parliament. He was reputed to favour a Lib–Lab deal and, given his SDP background, was a member of Labour's negotiating team that attempted to form an administration with the Liberal Democrats. After the Liberal Democrats formed a coalition government with the Conservative Party, Adonis stepped down from frontline politics.

Adonis later returned to active politics in 2012, as part of Ed Miliband's Shadow cabinet reshuffle. He worked with former Shadow Business Secretary Chuka Umunna on crafting Labour's industrial strategy, and previously took up the role of Shadow Minister for Infrastructure in the House of Lords, and overseeing the Armitt Review looking at future infrastructure plans for the Labour Party.

== Subsequent career ==
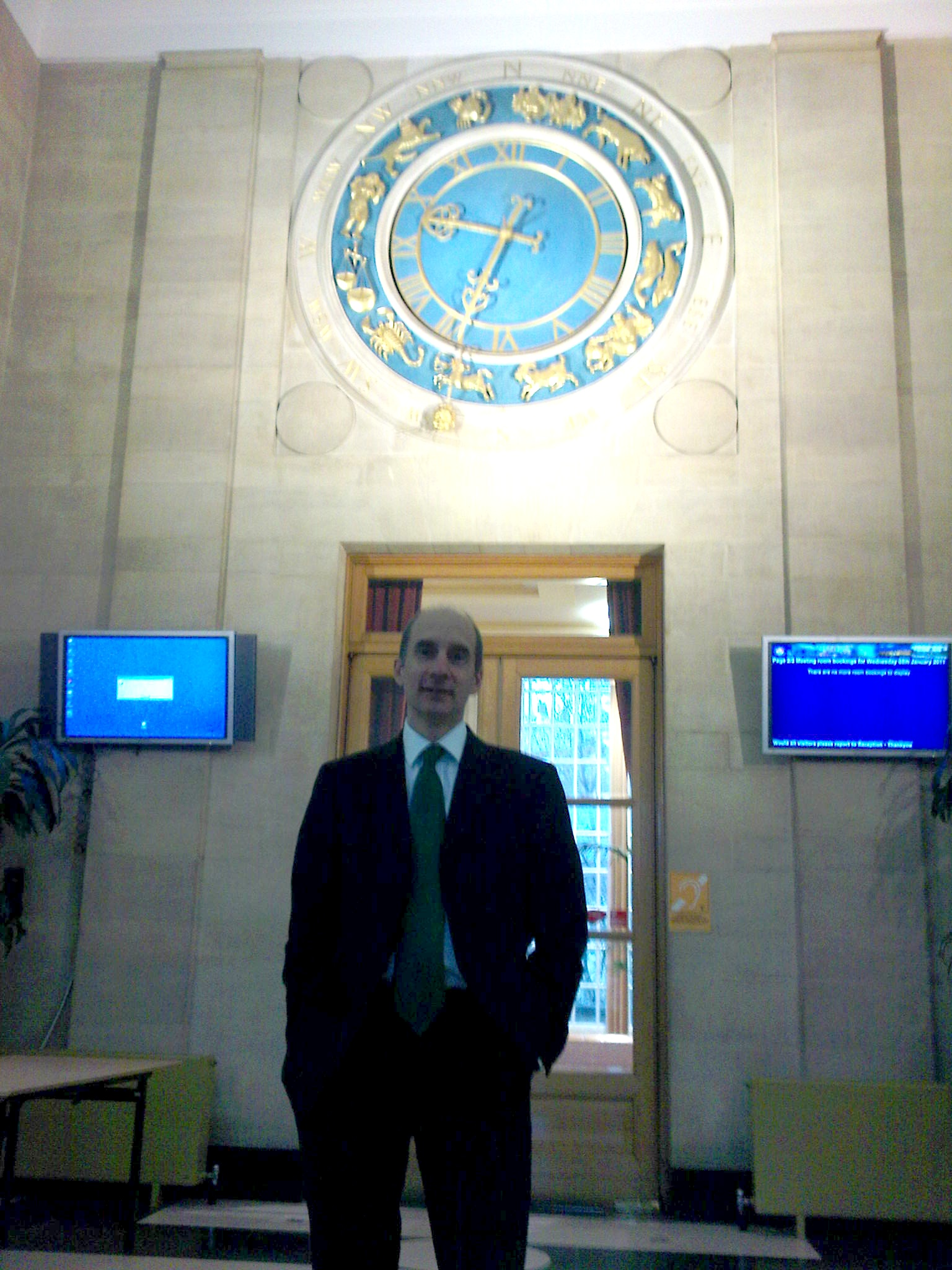
Adonis at Council House, Bristol in 2011

In July 2010, Adonis became the director of the Institute for Government, an independent charity with cross-party support and Whitehall governance working to improve government effectiveness. Adonis left the Institute for Government in January 2012, to become Chair of Progress, an internal Labour Party organisation. Having been appointed President of the Independent Academies Association, in 2012, Adonis was also admitted as a Liveryman Honoris Causa of the Worshipful Company of Haberdashers, one of the major charitable promoters of academies.

Lord Adonis is a Trustee of Teach First, the charity which recruits graduates to teach in state schools, as well as a Trustee of the vocational education charity Edge, and a Governor of the Baker-Dearing Trust, which supports the establishment of University Technical Colleges, technical schools for 14- to 18-year-olds. He has been a Director of RM Plc since October 2011. His book on education reform – Education, Education, Education – was published by Biteback in September 2012. In November 2014, he was appointed visiting professor at King's College London.

Adonis considered standing to be Labour's candidate for Mayor of London in 2016, but ended his putative campaign in February 2015, endorsing Tessa Jowell.

In October 2015, he resigned the Labour Party whip in the House of Lords to sit as a non-affiliated peer and lead a newly created National Infrastructure Commission (NIC). However, he resigned from the NIC in December 2017 because of HM Government's approach to Brexit, saying the UK was "hurtling towards the EU's emergency exit with no credible plan for the future of British trade and European co-operation". Adonis said he planned to oppose "relentlessly" the government's European Union (Withdrawal) Bill in the House of Lords. In his resignation letter, he wrote that, as well as Brexit, the recent decision to end the InterCity East Coast rail franchise three years early, at a cost of hundreds of millions of pounds, would also have forced him to quit. He also claimed that "taking us back into Europe will become the mission of our children's generation". On 15 April 2018 Adonis attended the launch event of the People's Vote, a campaign group calling for a public vote on the final Brexit deal between the UK and the European Union.

In 2018, Adonis also became a weekly columnist for The New European, a newly created newspaper which campaigned against Brexit and supported the People's Vote campaign.

In the 2019 European Parliament election, Adonis was second on Labour's party list for South West England but was not elected. Labour's share of the vote was 6.5% (a fall of 7.3% relative to the 2014 result) and the party lost its only MEP in the region.

Adonis was a participant at the 30 May – 2 June 2019 Bilderberg Meeting at Montreux, Switzerland.

Adonis advocated a rapid reopening of UK schools during the COVID-19 pandemic.

In May 2021, Adonis called for Tony Blair to return to frontline politics in the wake of a poll being released showing Labour 15% behind the Conservatives.

== Personal life ==
Adonis was formerly married to Kathryn Davies, who had been a student of his; the couple had two children. Adonis and Davies divorced in 2015. In a profile in the Evening Standard from May 2019, the journalist Julian Glover reported that Adonis was gay. Adonis came out as gay in an interview with the i newspaper in October 2019.

== Bibliography ==
=== Books ===
- Andrew Adonis; Keith Thomas, eds. (2004). Roy Jenkins: A Retrospective.
- Andrew Adonis, Stephen Pollard (1997). A Class Act: Myth of Britain's Classless Society.
- David Butler, Andrew Adonis & Tony Travers (1994). Failure in British government : the politics of the poll tax.
- Andrew Adonis (1993). Making Aristocracy Work: The Peerage and the Political System in Britain.
- Andrew Adonis; Andrew Tyrie, eds. (1989). Subsidiarity: no panacea.
- Andrew Adonis; Tim Hames, eds. (1994). The Thatcher-Reagan Decade in Perspective.
- Andrew Adonis (2012). Education Education Education: Reforming England's Schools.
- Adonis, Andrew (2013). 5 Days in May: The Coalition and Beyond. Biteback Publishing. ISBN 978-1849545662.
- Will Hutton, Andrew Adonis (2018). Saving Britain: How We Must Change To Prosper In Europe. Abacus: Little, Brown Book Group, London. ISBN 978-1408711224.
- Andrew Adonis, ed. (2018). Half In Half Out: Prime Ministers on Europe. Biteback Publishing. ISBN 978-1785904349.
- Andrew Adonis (2020). Ernest Bevin: Labour's Churchill. Biteback Publishing. ISBN 978-1785905988.

=== Articles ===
- Our progressives only look dead (prospects for a revival of progressivism in the United Kingdom), 1996, Andrew Adonis

=== Book reviews ===
Year	Review article	Work(s) reviewed
2014	Adonis, Andrew (21 November 2014). "Boney's bungles". New Statesman. 143 (5237): 45.	Roberts, Andrew (2014). Napoleon the Great. London: Allen Lane.

- Ben Pimlott The Queen: A Biography of Elizabeth II – book review, 1996, Andrew Adonis
- Christopher Booker and Richard North The Castle of Lies: Why Britain Must Get Out of Europe – book review, 1996, Andrew Adonis
- Anthony Barnett This Time: Our Constitutional Revolution – book review, 1996, Andrew Adonis
- Shirley Williams Climbing the Bookshelves: the Autobiography – book review, 2009, Andrew Adonis
- Roy Hattersley David Lloyd George: the Great Outsider – book review, 2010, Andrew Adonis
- David Laws 22 Days in May: The Birth of the Lib Dem-Conservative Coalition – book review, 2010, Andrew Adonis
- Chris Bowers Nick Clegg: the Biography – book review, 2011, Andrew Adonis

Political offices
Preceded by Stephen Timms	Minister of State for Education; 2005–2008	Succeeded by Jim Knight
Preceded by Rosie Winterton	Minister of State for Transport; 2008–2009	Succeeded by Sadiq Khan
Preceded by Geoff Hoon	Secretary of State for Transport; 2009–2010	Succeeded by Philip Hammond
Orders of precedence in the United Kingdom
Preceded by The Lord Stevens of Kirkwhelpington	Gentlemen; Baron Adonis	Followed by The Lord Kirkwood of Kirkhope
