= European Movement in Scotland =

Political pressure group

European Movement in Scotland (EMiS)
- Formation: 1990
- Type: Pressure group
- Headquarters: c/o Orbit Communications, 42 Charlotte Square, Edinburgh EH2 4HQ
- Location: Scotland, United Kingdom
- Official language: English
- President: David Martin
- Executive Committee Chair: David Clarke
- Vice Chair: Joanna Goodburn
- Website: www.euromovescotland.org.uk

The European Movement in Scotland (EMiS) is an independent non-party-political pressure group which – drawing on Scotland's deep-rooted European identity – campaigns for the closest alignment with the values and standards of the European Union (EU) with the aim of a return to membership. EMiS is associated with its partner organisation, the European Movement UK.

== Background ==
EMiS (together with the European Movement UK) is part of the wider European Movement International, present in over 30 countries across the continent, formed in the aftermath of the Second World War with the purpose of securing peace in Europe through co-operation and mutual interdependence. The concept of European unity arose from contacts between wartime resistance groups and was the focus of a speech by Winston Churchill delivered in Switzerland in September 1946. It was developed further in May 1948, when a large international gathering took place in The Hague, in The Netherlands. Although this Congress of Europe, attended by prominent political figures and other representatives from across the continent, failed to reconcile the views of those who favoured a federal union with others who preferred intergovernmental co-operation, it nevertheless provided a significant spur towards political and economic unity in Europe.

== European Movement International ==
The European Movement itself came into being in October 1948 when it was formally created under the joint leadership of Winston Churchill, Leon Blum, Alcide de Gasperi and Paul-Henry Spaak, with the objective of bringing together a range of interests from the worlds of politics, the economy and civil society, to promote closer European unity. In 1951, in a move designed to prevent future war in western Europe, France and Germany, and four other west European nations formed the European Coal and Steel Community, establishing a common market in the industries essential for armaments production and creating the basis for future European integration. Six years later these states joined together in the Treaty of Rome to form the European Economic Community which evolved and enlarged into the EU. Throughout this period, the European Movement championed the process of European co-operation and integration, based on the principles of "peace, democracy, liberty, solidarity, equality, justice, the respect for human rights and the rule of law", with a focus on citizenship participation, such as through the directly elected European Parliament.

== EMiS aims ==
The European Movement in Scotland seeks to promote the common values of the European Movement International in the context of a constitutionally devolved Scottish polity and a distinctive national identity within the United Kingdom (UK). In the 2016 referendum on UK membership of the EU, EMiS campaigned to remain in the EU and subsequently participated in the unsuccessful People's Vote campaign for a second confirmatory referendum. Following the formal departure of the UK from the EU in 2021 (Brexit), EMiS continues to call for the closest alignment of Scotland with the values and policies of the EU, with the aim of regaining full membership. This objective reflects the result of the 2016 referendum in Scotland, when the electorate voted by 62% to 38% (on a 67% turnout) to remain in the EU.

== EMiS activities ==
The movement has local associations throughout Scotland engaged in campaigning and related activities. Governmental organisations are lobbied on Europe-related issues such as the impact of Brexit on Scotland's economy and society and on standards of environmental protection. Street stalls and social media are deployed to raise public awareness. Support is provided for EU citizens resident in Scotland to secure their status following departure from the EU and solidarity expressed with the people of Ukraine. EMiS also campaigns for young people and their teachers in Scotland to have access to a programme of educational exchanges providing opportunities equivalent to those previously offered by the EU Erasmus+ scheme. EMiS has organised pro-EU marches and rallies such as one with Young European Movement in Edinburgh to protest against Brexit in October 2017 and one against the Westminster government's suspension of the UK Parliament in August 2019. Before the 2021 elections to the Scottish Parliament, EMiS urged all candidates and political parties to sign up to their manifesto of 15 pro-European policies. EMiS has organised online conferences such as one in January 2021 on how an Independent Scotland could join the EU.

In January 2023, EMiS linked up with the group "eu+me" to campaign jointly for closer ties between Scotland and the EU.

Also in January 2023 EMiS and South West Scotland for Europe projected a light display on the Old Court House, Kirkcudbright, with the message “50 years on Scotland still loves Europe.” This marked the anniversary of the UK joining the European Union in January 1973.

=== EuroWalks ===

Members of the movement have devised a series of EuroWalks – online self-guided walks and tours (for cyclists and motorists) featuring points of interest with European associations in Dumfries, Dundee, Dunfermline, Edinburgh, Glasgow, Kirkwall, Perth, St Andrews, Stirling and elsewhere.

== See also ==
- European Movement UK
- European Movement International
