= European Movement International =

Lobbying association for European integration

- Formation: July 1947
- Type: Lobbying association
- Headquarters: 2 Place du Luxembourg, Brussels, Belgium
- Location: Europe
- President: Guy Verhofstadt, MEP
- Key people: Petros Fassoulas, Magdalena Adamowicz, Tobias Köck, Antonio Argenziano, Noelle O’Connell, Valeria Ronzitti, Domènec Ruiz Devesa
- Website: www.europeanmovement.eu

The European Movement International is a lobbying association that coordinates the efforts of associations and national councils with the goal of promoting European integration, and disseminating information about it.

== History ==
Initially the European Movement in the 1940s brought together "federalists and European unionists". The federalists, organised mainly in the European Union of Federalists, sought "an abatement of national sovereignty" whilst the unionists aimed "at creating an association of states as close as is compatible with the retention of national sovereign independence."

In May 1949, the European Movement played a significant role in encouraging ten European states to create the Council of Europe, and to begin work on drafting a charter of rights, which eventually became the European Convention on Human Rights.

=== Presidents ===
Name	Term
Guy Verhofstadt	2023–present
Eva Maydell	2017–2023
Jo Leinen	2011–2017
Pat Cox	2005–2011
José María Gil-Robles	1999–2005
Mário Soares	1997–1999
Valéry Giscard d'Estaing	1989–1997
Enrique Barón Crespo	1987–1989
Giuseppe Petrilli	1981–1987
Georges Berthoin	1978–1981
Jean Rey	1974–1978
Walter Hallstein	1968–1974
Maurice Faure	1961–1968
Robert Schuman	1955–1961
Paul-Henri Spaak	1950–1955
Duncan Sandys	1948–1950

=== Secretaries General ===
Name	Term
Petros Fassoulas	2015–present
Diogo Pinto	2009–2015
Henrik Kröner	2002–2009
Pier Virgilio Dastoli	1995–2001
Giampiero Orsello	1993–1995
Bob Molenaar	1987–1993
Luigi Vittorio Majocchi	1985–1987
Sjouke Jonker	1984
Thomas Jansen	1981–1983
Robert van Schendel	1955–1980
Georges Rebattet (London office)	1948–1955
Józef Retinger (Paris office, from 11/1951 Brussels office)	1948–1950

== Activities ==
The Movement's various Councils and Associations, under the co-ordination of the European Movement International (EMI), work to influence European decision-makers - associations, governments, politicians, political parties, enterprises, trade unions and individual lobbyists - to promote European integration.

The EM also works as a study and information group operating through various projects and activities, and publishes information on European affairs and activities.

== Organisation ==
The Movement's central office, located at Place de Luxembourg in Brussels, is headed up by a President and six Vice-Presidents. Honorary Presidents, generally prominent European politicians, are also elected, but hold no executive powers.

The current President of the EMI is Guy Verhofstadt MEP. The management of the organisation is drawn from across Europe.

=== International associations ===
The EMI has several International Member Associations. These include civil society organisations, business and trade unions, NGOs, political parties, local authorities and academia.

=== Supporting members ===
- College of Europe
- Foundation Euractiv
- The Kosovar Civil Society Foundation - KCSF

=== National Councils ===
At national level there are National Councils in 39 countries, organized in a very diverse way. (Note: some councils are just consisting of individual members while historically the "councils" consisted mainly of associations (e.g. Italy, Germany, Spain)) In principle national councils of all countries which are members of the Council of Europe can join the European Movement. Only on national level the EM has youth branches. (Note: Such as the Young European Movement UK, which are usually the national sections of the Young European Federalists (JEF). On European level JEF is youth organisation of the Union of European Federalists.)

=== Board ===
Policy is formulated by a Board, the chairmanship of which is held by the President. A 'Federal Assembly', made up of delegates from all member organisations foments policies for the EMI and is in charge of the organisation's Auditors. Several specialist committees, devoted to the discussion of individual policies exist as well. The current Political Committees are: More Democracy, Citizens' Rights and Freedom; Jobs, Competitiveness and Sustainable Growth; and Europe in the World. Day-to-day office-work is performed by the staff, which is led by a Secretary General, who since 2015 has been Petros Fassoulas.

Current members of the Board are:

President - Guy Verhofstadt; Secretary General - Petros Fassoulas; Vice-presidents - Brando Benifei, Yves Bertoncini, Tobias Köck, Noelle O'Connell, Valeria Ronzitti, Frédéric Vallier; Treasurer - Nataša Owens; Board members - Aku Aarva, Francisco Aldecoa Luzárranga, Antonio Argenziano, Veronika Chmelárová, Marco Cilento, Sina Frank, Monica Frassoni, Patrizia Heidegger, Olivier Hinnekens, Zvezdana Kovač, Roselyne Lefrançois, Richard Morris.

== See also ==
- European Integration
- European Movement Belgium
- European Movement Germany
- European Movement Ireland
- European Movement UK
- European Movement in Scotland (EMiS)
- Politics of Europe
- Europeans Without Borders
