= Led By Donkeys =

British political campaign group

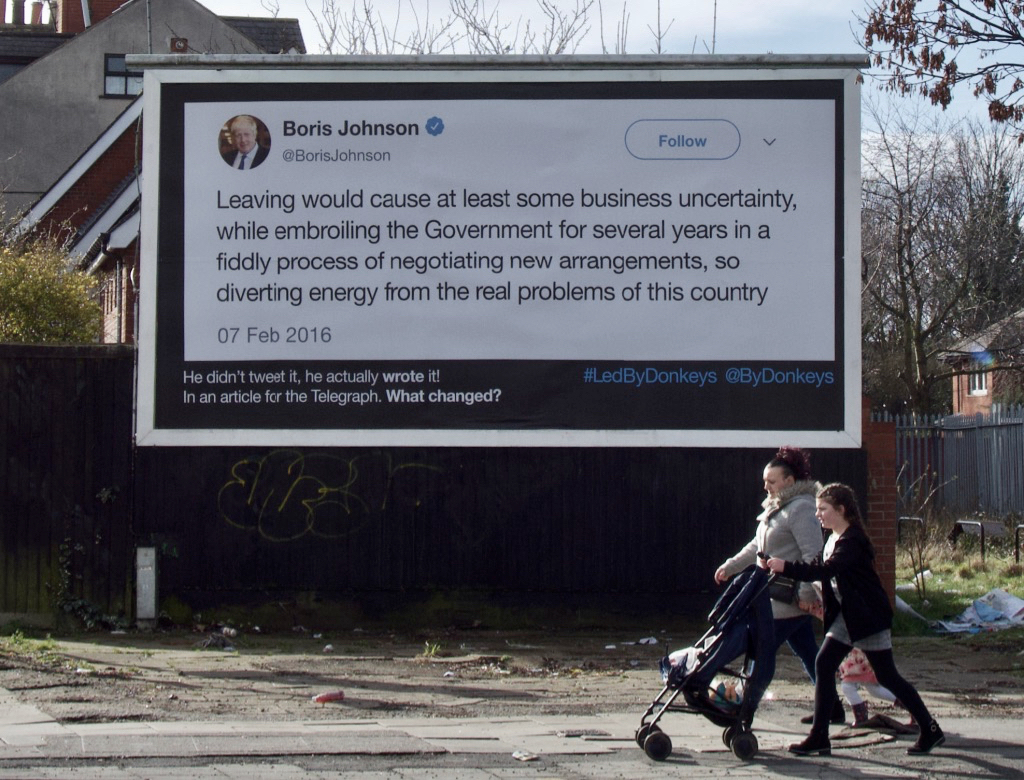
- A Led by Donkeys billboard quoting Boris Johnson expressing reservations about Brexit
- Established: 10 July 2019 (7 years ago)
- Founders: Ben John Stewart, James Sadri, William Rose, Oliver Knowles
- Types: organization
- Purpose: Anti-Brexit media campaign
- Country: United Kingdom
- Region served: UK
- Chairpersons: Oliver Knowles; Will Rose; James Sadri; Ben Stewart
- Website: www.ledbydonkeys.org

Led By Donkeys is a British political campaign group established in December 2018 as an anti-Brexit group, but which has also criticised other actions of the Conservative government. After the 2024 election of a Labour government, it defined itself as an "accountability project" and stated that the Labour government was also fair game.

Since the group's creation its four founders have been calling out what they call "thermonuclear hypocrisy" and used satire targeted at pro-Brexit politicians. Led By Donkeys' main campaign consists of hoardings containing past X posts by pro-Brexit politicians, or quotes presented as tweets. These tweets state the politicians' previous political positions, which according to the group have not stood the test of time.

The campaign was initially run as a guerilla operation, in which Led By Donkeys posters were plastered over existing adverts. It was then expanded into a crowdfunded campaign that purchased advertising space on hundreds of billboards across the UK. Later the group staged real-life stunts, including projecting messages on iconic places including the Houses of Parliament and the White Cliffs of Dover, carving giant messages on beaches and fields, and directing crowds to unfurl huge flags at pro-European Union marches. Videos of these messages were subsequently viewed millions of times on social media. The campaign group won the award for Best Social Media Campaign in the 2019 Social Purpose Awards, and won gold in the National Social Impact category in the 2020 Outdoor Media Awards.

The group's name comes from the phrase "lions led by donkeys", referring to British soldiers in the First World War, who were led to their deaths by leaders deemed incompetent and indifferent.

== Background ==
In the Conservative Party's manifesto for the general election in May 2015, the party promised a referendum on the UK's European Union membership by the end of 2017. In the 2016 referendum voters voted by 52% to 48% to leave the European Union. By December 2018 the UK had not yet left.

== Beginning ==
In December 2018, four friends were discussing their frustrations with the ongoing Brexit situation in The Birdcage, a pub in Stoke Newington. All four men had a connection with environmental campaign group Greenpeace; Oliver Knowles and Ben Stewart were employees, and James Sadri and Will Rose had previously been involved with the group. In the referendum, they had all voted to remain in the EU. During this period, the group discovered an old tweet by former prime minister David Cameron. This tweet, dating from before the 2015 election, read "Britain faces a simple and inescapable choice - stability and strong Government with me, or chaos with Ed Miliband". They agreed it would be a shame if Cameron deleted it, as in their view it summed up the "failure of Britain's political leadership". They were also frustrated by the failure, in their opinion, of British media to hold leaders of the Brexit campaign to account. They decided to preserve the tweet by printing it out and pasting it up. Each of them chose a statement from a pro-Brexit politician to go up on billboards as well as "tweets you can't delete", looking for the "most offensive lies, lunacy and hypocrisy" in their view. They settled on the following four old claims: "The day after we vote to leave we hold all the cards and can choose the path we want" (Michael Gove, April 2016); "The Free Trade Agreement that we will do with the European Union should be one of the easiest in human history" (Liam Fox, July 2017); "There will be no downside to Brexit, only a considerable upside" (David Davis, October 2016); "Getting out of the EU can be quick and easy – the UK holds most of the cards in any negotiation" (John Redwood, July 2016). Two years later, by Christmas 2018, with prime minister Theresa May's Brexit deal stuck in parliament, none of these claims had materialised, according to The Guardian.

Rose designed the posters. Sadri came up with the name "Lions led by donkeys", a common phrase referring to soldiers in the First World War who were led to their deaths by incompetent and indifferent leaders. They thought it well described the relationship between the British people and their Brexit leaders. Rose shortened it to #LedByDonkeys. They had the five tweets printed at billboard size. The activists bought a ladder, high-visibility jackets to look legitimate, a bucket, a roller and wallpaper paste. On the night of 8 January 2019 they illegally plastered the David Cameron tweet over a finance advert on a billboard on the A10 in Stoke Newington. They posted a photo of the billboard to their new Twitter account, and asked journalist Marina Hyde of The Guardian to retweet it; this soon resulted in hashtag #LedByDonkeys trending on Twitter. Within a day, their billboard poster had been plastered over with blue paper.

== Growth ==
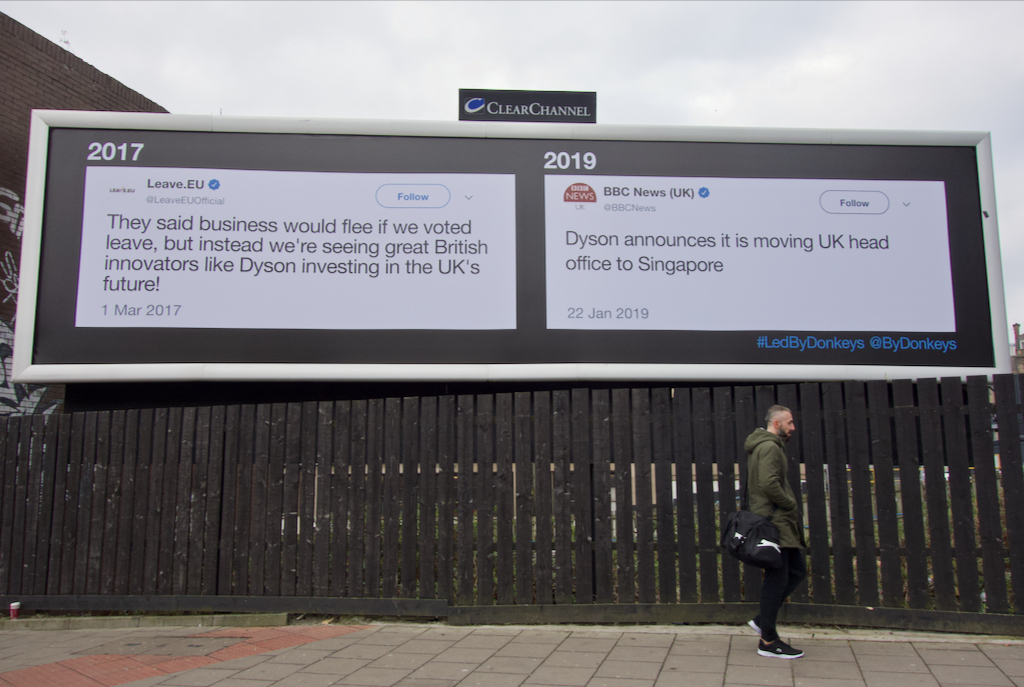
A Led By Donkeys billboard in Newcastle

In the time between their day jobs and their family life, at night the group illegally pasted the other four original tweets on billboards around London. The group stated that one of their aims was to spark a discussion amongst Leave voters about the promises of the leading Brexiteers. They therefore chose Dover, a pro-Brexit constituency, as their next location. They selected four additional historical Brexiteer statements, partially from suggestions made by their social media followers, among which was Dominic Raab's 2018 statement "I hadn't quite understood the full extent of this but ... we are particularly reliant on the Dover-Calais crossing". On 16 January 2019 the group tweeted photos of the four Dover billboards, along with the message "A busy night on the Brexit frontline. We've covered Dover in the historic quotes of the people responsible for this chaos. Britain is a nation #LedByDonkeys." The group later stated that this was the moment when they went viral. The next day all four posters were removed by the billboard company.

Social media followers asked for billboards all over the country. The activists deplored the tribalism triggered by Brexit and agreed that going national was needed. Their followers suggested that they set up a crowdfunder to raise money to legitimately put billboards up in places far outside London. Initially the group resisted this, considering the fact that their acts were illegal to be an important part of the activism of the project. They also feared they would have to give up their anonymity to get crowdfunding, thus risking fines and convictions. But when people from crowdfunder.co.uk contacted them, they learned that they could stay anonymous, and video footage of the Dover billboards being removed within a day made the group change their mind. They set up a fundraising target of £10,000. It was reached within three hours. By November 2019 the group had raised £500,000 and had become the biggest crowdfunded political campaign in UK history.

The group has described itself in various ways: "a Brexit accountability project", calling out "thermonuclear hypocrisy", and "political street theatre". They did not have a grand plan with big ambitions. Initially, they simply considered it cathartic to do something themselves, namely, hold the Brexiteers to account, which they thought nobody else was doing but should. They said they held them to account by putting the old tweets back into the public space and give people the opportunity to re-read them in "the reality about what's unfolding". They brought the Greenpeace "ethos of the mindbomb of campaigning", where one single picture can shift people's perceptions, to their Led By Donkeys work. Humour plays a key part as well. According to one of the activists, "making fun of politicians has the ability to break through" the partisan atmosphere a bit. They not only made fun of Brexiteers. They also ridiculed Labour Party leader Jeremy Corbyn for his ambivalent stance on Brexit with an empty billboard.

It was not known who were behind Led By Donkeys for several months. Nobody at Greenpeace knew that two of their staff were among the founders. Although the activists did give interviews, including with international press such as Al Jazeera, NBC News and NPR, these did not reveal their names; some used fake first names instead. When political website Guido Fawkes claimed on social media that Led By Donkeys was breaching election laws by overspending, (Note: The Electoral Commission later confirmed that Led By Donkeys did not break any spending rules.) the activists realised that it would not be long before their names would be revealed. To pre-empt this, they arranged an interview with The Observer in order to make their identities public themselves. Six months later they published a book describing their unexpected adventure, entitled Led By Donkeys: How four friends with a ladder took on Brexit.

== Campaigns ==
=== Main campaign ===
The main campaign of holding Brexiteers to account has been ongoing. Their stated strategy is to research the archives of public statements by pro-Brexit politicians and publicly display those that appear to be at odds with the reality of the day. By November 2019 over 300 billboards in predominantly pro-Brexit areas have carried Led By Donkeys messages, and are estimated to have reached 30 million people.

The design of statements as tweets on billboards was tweaked in late January 2019. One of the billboards featured Jacob Rees-Mogg's 2011 statement in the House of Commons that it might make sense to have two referendums. Led By Donkeys had rendered it in its standard tweet format. Rees-Mogg then called the billboard dishonest, not only because he had been talking about different circumstances, but also because he was not yet on Twitter in 2011. From then on Led By Donkeys added a footnote to billboards featuring statements other than tweets. In the case of Rees-Mogg they added "He didn't tweet it, he actually said it! In the House of Commons. What changed?" Once they collaborated with satirical artist Coldwar Steve on a more elaborate billboard shown at pop festival Glastonbury 2019.

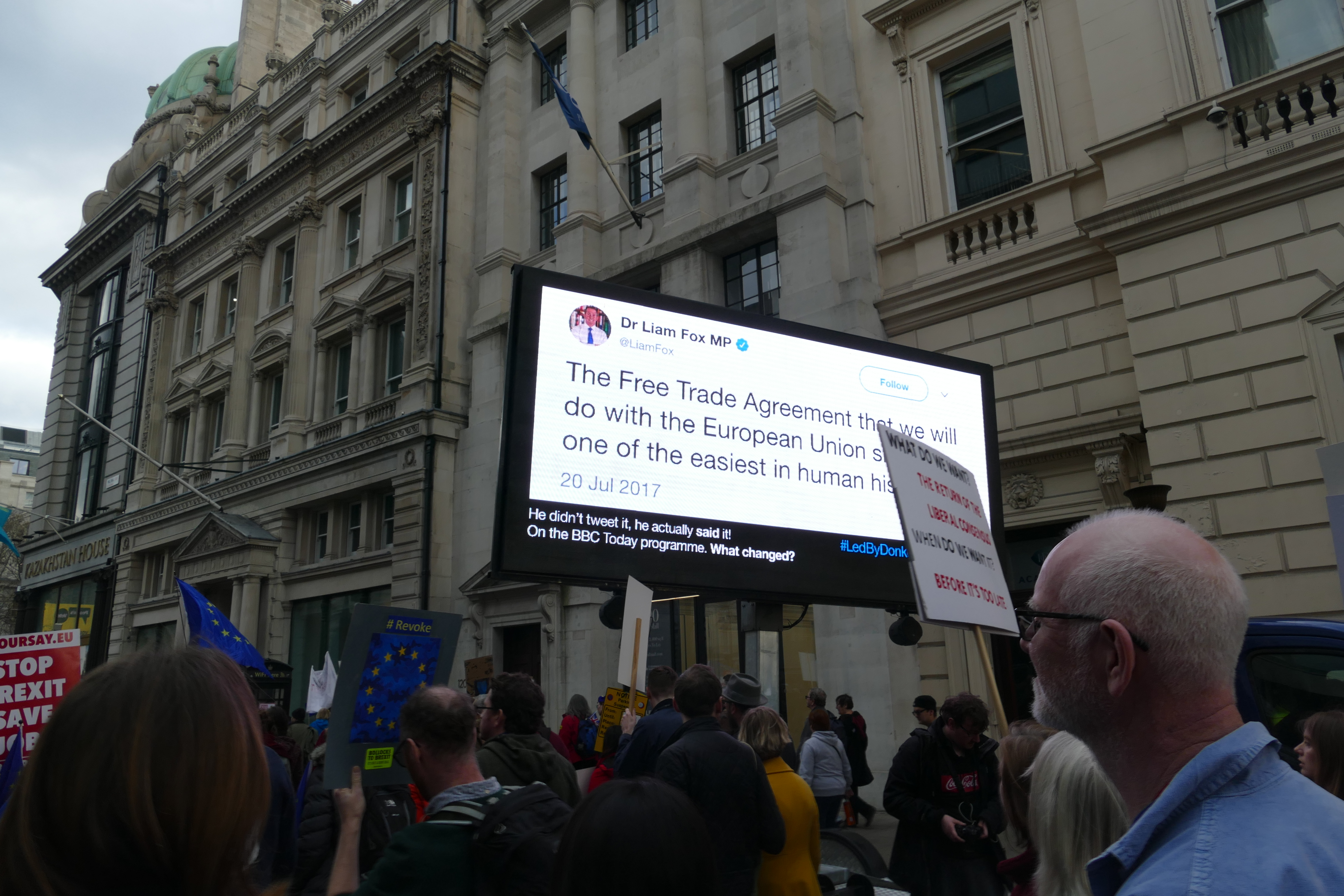
A Led By Donkeys billboard at the Put It to the People march in March 2019

As time passed, the activists chose other media besides billboards. They have used ad vans, industrial projectors, designs on beaches, fields, and very large crowd flags. The first crowd flag was unfolded on Parliament Square by thousands of anti-Brexit protesters at the conclusion of the Put It to the People march on 23 March 2019. Led By Donkeys hired a helicopter to film the unfolding from the air. The banner showed a 2012 quote from David Davis: "If a democracy cannot change its mind, it ceases to be a democracy". CBS News called it the defining moment of the day.

When the EU was considering giving the UK an extension to the original Brexit deadline of 29 March 2019, Led By Donkeys used a giant projector to display a video on the White Cliffs of Dover. Their goal was to ask the EU leaders for much more time, so that there could be a second referendum. The video displayed an SOS in blue, with the O made up of yellow stars, to mimic the EU flag. EU leader Guy Verhofstadt tweeted back the next day that it was "quite something to see the White Cliffs of Dover turn blue". Other projections included a video projected onto the Houses of Parliament, asking if Boris Johnson is a criminal, after the Supreme Court ruled he unlawfully suspended parliament; onto Buckingham Palace saying "Your majesty, your new prime minister is a liar"; and projections onto Edinburgh Castle; Cardiff Castle; the Titanic Museum in Belfast; and in Brussels. In September 2019 Michael Gove was in charge of preparing the UK for a no-deal Brexit. In March of that year, Gove had written in a Daily Mail article that there is no mandate for a no-deal Brexit: "We didn't vote to leave without a deal". To point out this contradiction, Led By Donkeys carved a large portrait of Gove and this quote in the sandy beach of Redcar. Coinciding with the Let Us Be Heard march on 19 October 2019, Led By Donkeys ploughed a message in 40 meter (130 foot) high letters in a field in Wiltshire, saying "Britain now wants to remain". This conclusion was based on a YouGov analysis of 300 polls.

=== March to Leave ===
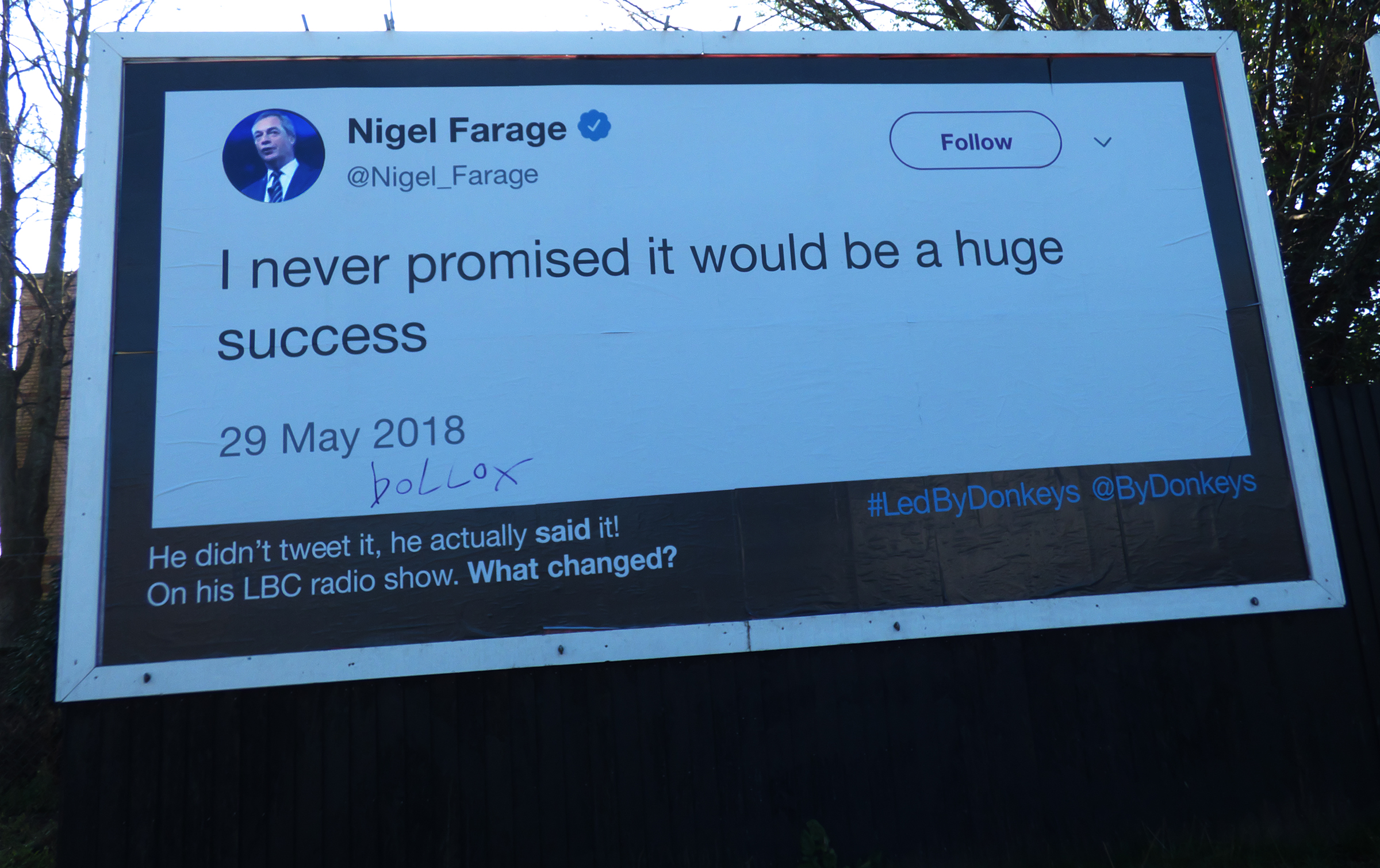
Led By Donkeys billboard in Bristol

In March 2019, it was announced that Brexit Party leader Nigel Farage was to organise a two-week pro-Brexit march from Sunderland to London titled March to Leave. Led By Donkeys set up a dedicated crowdfundraiser entitled "Let's take the truth to Farage's Brexit march". They deliberately did not target the marchers, just their leader. The collective hired two advans to accompany the pro-Brexit march, displaying past statements and videoclips of Farage. A YouTube videoclip of Farage not being happy with the ad van displaying his 2016 declaration "If Brexit is a disaster I'll go and live abroad" had been watched 2 million times within weeks.

=== European Parliament election ===
In April 2019, the Brexit Party set up an official website at thebrexitparty.org, but did not register thebrexitparty.com; Led By Donkeys registered a parody website at that address. The Brexit Party did not publish a manifesto prior to the EU elections in May. Led By Donkeys decided to write it for them by putting their past statements and tweets on billboards across the UK, and keep a repository on the parody website. The Led By Donkeys efforts failed to achieve their goal. The Brexit Party won the most seats in the election. Later in 2019, after having received a threatening legal letter from the Brexit Party to cease and desist, citing EU law, the group offered them the web address for over a million pounds.

=== 2019 state visit by Donald Trump ===
US President Donald Trump has made pro-Brexit statements and praised Farage and Johnson. Prior to Trump's state visit to London in June 2019, Led By Donkeys designed a campaign to diminish the two leading Brexiteers through association with the president, who was considered unpopular in the UK. Led By Donkeys projected onto Big Ben a 2015 video of Johnson saying that Trump would be unfit for the presidency. Before they could get arrested, they moved to the Tower of London to project a comparison of Trump's UK approval rating of 21% and former president Barack Obama's of 72%. Finally they projected a red USS John S. McCain hat onto the dome of Madame Tussauds, trolling Trump based on news reports that in Japan his aides had orchestrated events to avoid Trump seeing the ship's crew displaying the name of his adversary. The group cancelled plans to project Trump's Access Hollywood tape onto Buckingham Palace during his state dinner with the Queen at the eleventh hour. On their social media account the group posted videos of their stunts. Johnson's Big Ben video was viewed two million times; the three videos together amassed 12 million views on Twitter. Johnson cancelled a previously arranged meeting with Trump.

=== Get ready for Brexit ===
Following the government's multimillion-pound Get ready for Brexit advertising campaign in August 2019, with a no-deal Brexit a possibility as the October 31 deadline approached, Led By Donkeys crowdfunded money for a spoof campaign. The group felt the government was overlooking the negative effects of a no-deal Brexit and the ad campaign was poorly designed. They put up billboards in the style of the official campaign but featuring conclusions from the government's own analysis, for example "Get ready for 'possible increased risk of serious organised crime'". They subsequently ran a competition for members of the public to see who could best satirise the government's ad campaign. The five winning entries were displayed on billboards across the country. A crowd flag with the message "Get ready for a People's Vote" in the visual design of the government's own campaign was unfolded on Parliament Square during the Let Us Be Heard march in October 2019.

=== General election ===
Leading up to the general election on 12 December 2019 Led By Donkeys continued their main anti-Brexit campaign. In addition to using billboards, ad vans, and projections, they staged various real-world acts, filmed them and spread them on social media. In the final week before the election they crowdfunded over £250,000 within 24 hours to run anti-Johnson ads on Facebook, making them one of the largest spenders on political ads. Three ads were each viewed more than one million times. The group organised the carving of a giant message on a Devon beach, with six doctors and nurses writing "You can't trust Boris Johnson with our NHS". GPS technology was used to draw the outlines of the letters and Johnson. The NHS staff filled them in. A similar technique was used when teachers wrote a giant anti-Johnson message in a field in the Peak District. The Led By Donkeys efforts did not achieve their goal. The pro-Brexit parties won the majority of seats, although the parties that campaigned for at least a second referendum received the majority of votes.

=== Brexit Day ===
The UK left the EU on 31 January 2020. Led By Donkeys projected a video message to the EU onto the White Cliffs of Dover. It featured Second World War veterans expressing sadness about leaving the EU, and hope that one day Britain would be together with Europe again. The video of the projection was seen a million times on Brexit Day. Guy Verhofstadt, Brexit coordinator for the European Parliament, responded with "We'll look after your star". The group projected onto Big Ben a compilation of controversial clips of Johnson and Farage, punctuated by fake Big Ben bongs.

=== Coronavirus ===
In April 2020, Led By Donkeys projected footage of NHS workers on to the Palace of Westminster. By then 55 NHS staff had died from COVID-19, and prime minister Johnson had just been taken out of intensive care following his own fight with the disease. In the video NHS workers asked Johnson to address the shortages in personal protective equipment in the NHS. In May 2020, the group drove an advertising van in front of the house of Johnson's senior advisor Dominic Cummings, as the press was gathered there during the controversy concerning his apparent breaking of lockdown rules. Johnson's "Stay at Home" message was played on the van's videoscreen. The activists ran a billboard campaign parodying the government's public health messaging, changing the official "Stay alert, control the virus, save lives" into "Stay alert, government incompetence costs lives". In July the group beamed a 10-minute video onto Barnard Castle showing a timeline of the government's handling of the coronavirus pandemic. On social media this was viewed over 2 million times.

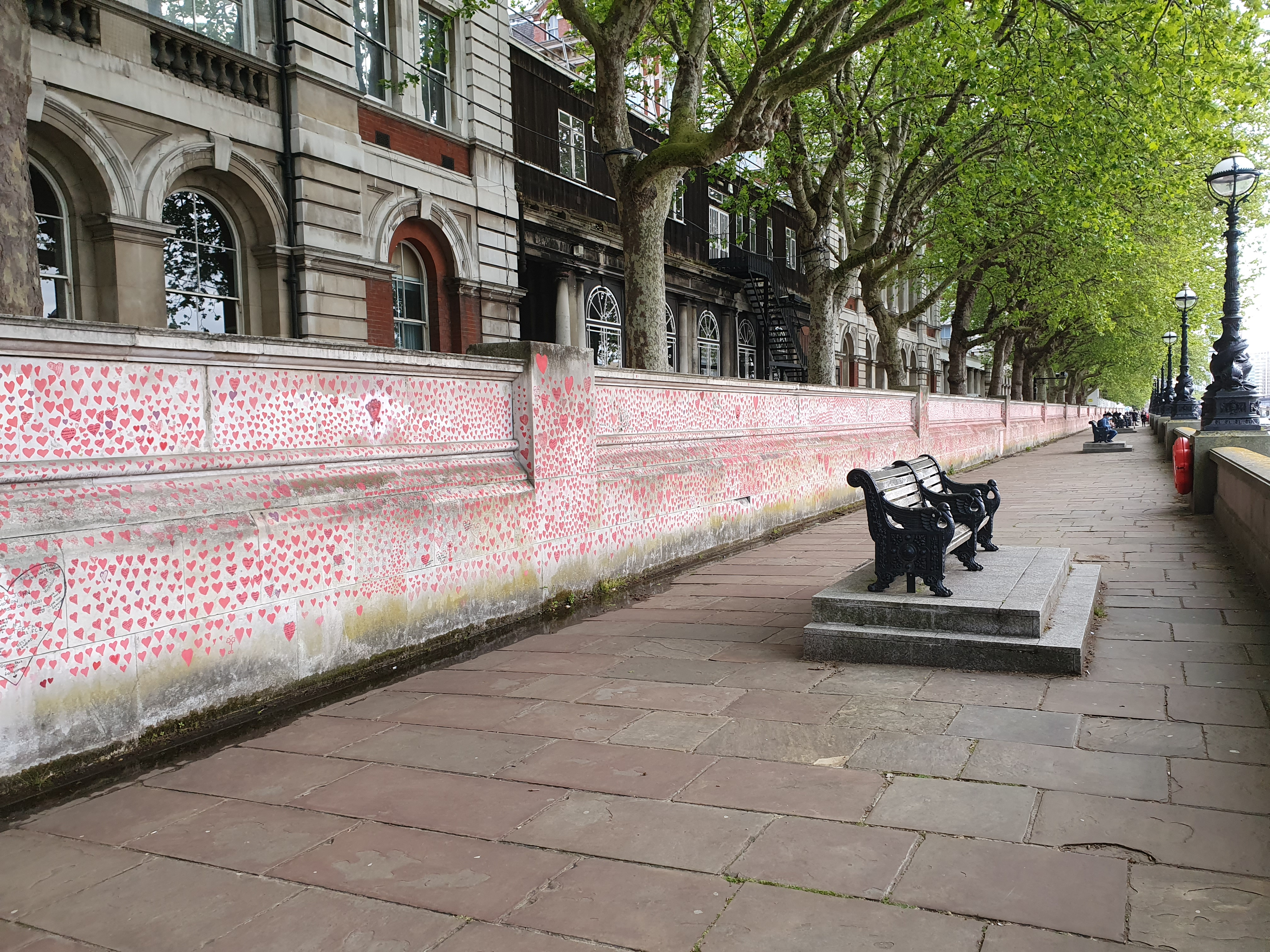
A section of the National Covid Memorial Wall in London

When the US passed 200,000 COVID-19 deaths a timeline of the number of deaths was projected onto Trump's Turnberry golf course in Scotland, alongside the number of times the president had played golf since the start of the pandemic. The audio is of Trump from before being elected president in 2016, saying he would never play golf if he were president. In November 2020 Led By Donkeys worked with the Covid-19 Bereaved Families for Justice group to project a message from bereaved families onto the Houses of Parliament. The video urged prime minister Johnson to keep his promise to speak to the families who lost loved-ones during the pandemic. They later worked with the bereaved families on the National Covid Memorial Wall, with over 150,000 hearts painted on a wall in Westminster. Dressed as construction workers and looking official, they had already painted the wall and drawn a thousand hearts by the time authorities realised what was happening. When in June 2021 coronavirus restrictions were not lifted, the group published a timeline video in which they argued that the government reacted slow to the new Delta variant because of post-Brexit political manoeuvring.

In August 2021 the group worked with the Good Law Project to produce a video asking questions about the government's procurement conduct during the pandemic, amplifying the accusations of corruption and lack of transparency. They beamed the video up onto the walls of Westminster Parliament.

Following MP Dawn Butler's ejection from the Commons in July 2021 for stating that prime minister Johnson lied to parliament over and over again, the group collaborated with the Communication Workers Union and projected a video onto the Houses of Parliament of Johnson making claims which they said were lies.

=== Partygate ===
When the Metropolitan Police declined to investigate whether any rule-breaking parties were held at 10 Downing Street during the 2020 Christmas period lockdown, Led By Donkeys drove a video screen to the Scotland Yard offices. A Line of Duty parody video was played urging the police to change their mind and start an investigation. A few weeks later a second Line of Duty parody with Johnson being questioned by officers was viewed over 5 million times on social media, and shown on morning television shows. A third spoof, viewed 1.5 million times within 24 hours, involved Metropolitan Police Commissioner Cressida Dick being asked by lead investigator Ted Hastings "Who exactly does the Metropolitan Police work for, ma'am?" After the Met had concluded its investigation, and fined over 100 people for breaking the rules, including Johnson, Led By Donkeys projected a six-minute video onto the Houses of Parliament, showing a timeline of parties and rules. The Independent called it "spectacular". They subsequently created a website called followtherules.co.uk showing the 100 times Johnson urged the British public to follow the COVID-19 rules.

=== Miscellaneous ===
In December 2020 the group made its dossier on Johnson's statements regarding Brexit available on a website called johnsondossier.com. It contains transcripts of speeches, interviews and newspaper columns Johnson wrote since February 2016. The group's aim is to allow the public, journalists, and others to hold Johnson to account.

In July 2021 Led By Donkeys put up billboards displaying the UK brands that advertised on the new TV show Farage, broadcast on GB News, saying "These companies pay for Nigel Farage to attack RNLI lifeboat crews on his TV show." The following week one of the companies, supermarket chain Sainsbury's, announced it had ended their advertising on GB News.

Following the UK Government's indecision to include London-based Russian oligarch Roman Abramovich in their sanctions package against Russia in February 2022, Led By Donkeys placed a blue plaque on the gate of his house. In a viral video it shows the plaque reads: "Billionaire Putin crony Roman Abramovich 1966~ lives here. It's worth £150m but the government won't seize it." The following week the activists put out another Line of Duty spoof video, showing prime minister Johnson being interviewed about the Conservative Party's links to Russian oligarchs.

During the 2022 summer holidays delays at the port of Dover, Led By Donkeys played a video on a truck in the miles long queue, showing quotes from the past by various Brexiteers about there being no danger of delays at Dover. The video was popular on social media.

After the downturn in the financial markets following the announced economic plans by Prime Minister Liz Truss in September 2022, Led By Donkeys placed an oversized blue plaque at 55 Tufton Street, reading "The UK was crashed here". In their video on social media they argued that the thinktanks located here were behind the failed policies.

On 23 February 2023, Led By Donkeys spilled approximately 340 litres of blue and yellow paint on separate directions of the road outside the Russian embassy in London, re-creating the Ukrainian flag in protest against the Russian invasion of Ukraine.

In 2023, the group ran a campaign duping politicians into taking a job for a fake South Korean company. Two leading Conservative politicians, Kwasi Kwarteng and Matt Hancock, were caught on camera agreeing to work for £10,000. The chairman of the 1922 Committee, Graham Brady, also agreed to take a position as an advocate for £6,000 a day.

In June 2024, the group disrupted an event where Nigel Farage was campaigning for the 2024 general election by slowly unfurling an electric banner behind him featuring an image of Vladimir Putin with the caption "I ♡ Nigel." They similarly disrupted another event in August at which former prime minister Liz Truss was speaking at Beccles Public Hall in Suffolk by unfurling a banner behind her with a picture of a lettuce and the caption "I crashed the economy"; Truss walked out when she realised. Speaking of this prank, Stewart, who was arrested following this event, stated that Led By Donkeys was an "accountability project" which was also "not starry-eyed about Labour", and that Labour, which was now in government, was "fair game".

In December 2024, LBD placed a 40x40m banner in Parliament Square reading "Yes it's a genocide". An aerial video of the banner, which referred to the Gaza genocide, was posted on social media with voiceover from Amos Goldberg, an Israeli historian. The banner was seized and destroyed by Greater London Authority officers. In November 2026, waste firm Veolia paid LBD £27,216 as compensation for the banner.

In January 2025, the group claimed responsibility for a stunt in which Elon Musk's straight-arm gesture, interpreted by many as a Nazi salute, was projected onto a Tesla factory in Germany along with the words "Heil Tesla". In a social media post, the group said that Musk was promoting the far right and called upon readers not to buy a Tesla. German police were investigating the possible use of unconstitutional symbols.

In September 2025, for a President Trump state visit, LBD rented a hotel room across from Windsor Castle and projected a video of Trump and former friend and convicted paedophile, Jeffrey Epstein, on the exterior. Four people were taken into custody and the event gained international attention.

In November 2026, LBD placed a Ku Klux Klan hood on the head of the statue of 19th century colonialist Cecil Rhodes at Oriel College, Oxford, in protest against an upcoming student event at the college with Nathan Cofnas, an academic who advocates for scientific racism. The group also placed a sign on the statue reading "Racists welcome here". A petition against the widely condemned event gained over 30,000 signatures.

== Impact ==
By early 2020, the Led By Donkeys messages had been seen hundreds of millions of times on social media and attracted mainstream media exposure. However, they had failed to help achieve their goal of getting a second referendum on what Brexit should look like. The group's spokesman Stewart said he did not think their efforts had been in vain, despite the UK having left the EU on 31 January 2020: "we didn't set out to try and stop Brexit. We were trying to fill a vacuum left by a broken media ecosystem. The media weren't holding power to account and we managed to really piss off people like David Davis and others, so we were holding power to account in their place, and that's really what we intended to do". Despite Stewart considering their efforts not being in vain in that they brought evidence of political hypocrisy to a mass audience, he did identify what he sees as a worrying phenomenon: "On both sides of the Atlantic, the concept of shame and political leaders paying a price for lying and dissembling is in retreat."

Led By Donkeys vowed to continue their work after Brexit Day. Stewart said "there's much still to fight for ... Our future relationship with Europe has not yet been defined." "We're not shutting up shop just yet". In an interview with The Guardian in 2024, the group said they had only just got started.

== Critical reception ==
Columnist Dawn Foster of The Guardian did not believe the billboards have changed anybody's opinion. Specifically regarding the Brexit Party manifesto billboards, she believed them to be counterproductive and that they actually helped spread the beliefs. One billboard, featuring Ann Widdecombe's quote "homosexual acts are wrongful" with the headline "Target gay people", was meant to warn voters of her homophobic beliefs. Foster called it fundamentally flawed, saying that to most it would seem like an anti-gay campaign, and that the group had overlooked the fact that most people would not see it as a warning. Led By Donkeys pulled the billboard within 24 hours after a social media backlash, acknowledged their mistake, and apologised for any unintentional pain caused to the gay community.

In January 2019 Led By Donkeys put up a quote by Boris Johnson near the Jaguar Land Rover factory in Solihull, a place affected by recent job losses. The quote in question was a response Johnson gave in 2018 to business concerns about a hard Brexit: he responded with a simple "Fuck business". The Birmingham Mail reported the following day that the local community had reacted with fury as the billboard was near a school. However, one local interviewed said "In an ideal world the billboard wouldn't be there, but in an ideal world our foreign secretary wouldn't be the type of person who thinks 'f**k business' is an acceptable response to people losing their jobs."

Writing in the marketing industry magazine Campaign, Angus Macadam thought the creative content was "quite brilliant in its meditative simplicity" and added "these messages hinge on and are driven by the one thing we currently miss most in politics: inarguable truth". In the same magazine Eliza Williams called the group's campaign "witty" and "subversive". Advertising expert Ian Henderson said brands should draw inspiration from Led By Donkeys if they want their out-of-home advertising to leave a digital footprint. Journalist Raymond Snoddy, a former BBC News 24 presenter, wrote that the activists have exposed the UK media's failures to hold the government to account: "By concentrating on the here and now, the ever breaking news, the media has been swept along without pausing enough to think enough about the enormity of what has happened and how we've got there. ... The only certainty is that Led By Donkeys can be relied upon to rise to the occasion on both Boris Johnson and Brexit."

Journalist Ian Burrell wrote in February 2022, after the Line of Duty parody videos appeared on the morning TV shows, that the group's wide reach stems from their creative ideas. He praised the "slick production" of the videos, including the commissioning of authors and journalists such as former BBC Newsnight presenter Gavin Esler, to collaborate on projects.

Led By Donkeys won the award for Best Social Media Campaign in the 2019 Social Purpose Awards organised by marketing website The Drum. They were awarded gold in the National Social Impact category of the 2020 Outdoor Media Awards, which is run by Clear Channel UK in partnership with Campaign.

The group and its campaigns are the focus of a book by Philip Seargeant which explores tactics of political activism in the linguistic landscape.

== See also ==
- Cold War Steve
