= Tobias Koch =

Tobias Koch may refer to:

- Tobias Koch (pianist)
- Tobias Koch (footballer)
- Tobias Koch (politician) (born 1973), German politician

== See also ==
- Tobias Köck, German political and cultural scientist
