= Robert van Schendel =

European federalist

Secretary General of the European Movement International
- In office 1955–1980

Personal details
- Occupation: European federalist
- Known for: Coordination of pro-European civil-society networks; mobilisation during the 1965-1966 Empty Chair Crisis

Robert van Schendel was a European federalist who served as the longest-standing Secretary General of the European Movement International from 1955 to 1980.

== European Movement ==
During his 25-year tenure, Van Schendel was a coordinating figure of the pro-European civil-society network. He helped mobilise public and political support for supranational institutions, notably during the 1965-1966 Empty Chair Crisis provoked by French president Charles de Gaulle. In July 1965 he sent a letter to all national sections of the European Movement calling for demonstrations in Brussels and an emergency congress (held in Cannes in October 1965) to defend the Community method against Gaullist intergovernmentalism. As a consequence, on July 19th 1965 a large Europeanist demonstration took place in Brussels.

== College of Europe ==
Van Schendel was also associated with the College of Europe in Bruges, where he served as executive director in the late 1960s and represented the institution at official ceremonies, such as the opening ceremony for the 1967/68 academic year.

== Further activities ==
Van Schendel participated in public events, such as a 1973 news conference in London with Lord Harlech and Professor Eugene Rostow discussing transatlantic relations. He also attended meetings with figures like former European Commission President Jean Rey to discuss integration crises.

He was also involved in the debates on the enlargement of the European Communities, particularly regarding Spain's future membership while the country was still under the Franco dictatorship. In 1981 he published an analysis of Spanish attitudes toward EC accession.
