= Tim Hames =

Tim Hames was director general of the British Private Equity and Venture Capital Association (BVCA). Before joining the BVCA, Hames was a columnist and chief leader writer at The Times. He occasionally writes travel pieces. He also wrote for The Tablet and the Charleston Mercury. Before joining the Times in 1999, he was a lecturer in politics at Oxford University. He attended Oriel College, Oxford. He has a doctorate in philosophy (DPhil) from the University of Oxford.

Together with Andrew Adonis he wrote A Conservative Revolution?, a work looking at the rise of Thatcherism.

Hames edited the Times Guide to the House of Commons in 2001 and 2005. He was mocked by the magazine Private Eye for a 2007 column entitled "I’ve got the sauce to say it: Barack Obama is a loser" in which he made inaccurate predictions about the future of American politics including saying it was "absurd" to say Obama would become president, and that if he won he would eat his words with Tabasco sauce.

On 8 September 2009, it was announced that Hames would become special adviser to the Speaker of the House of Commons, John Bercow.
