= People's Vote =

UK Brexit referendum campaign group

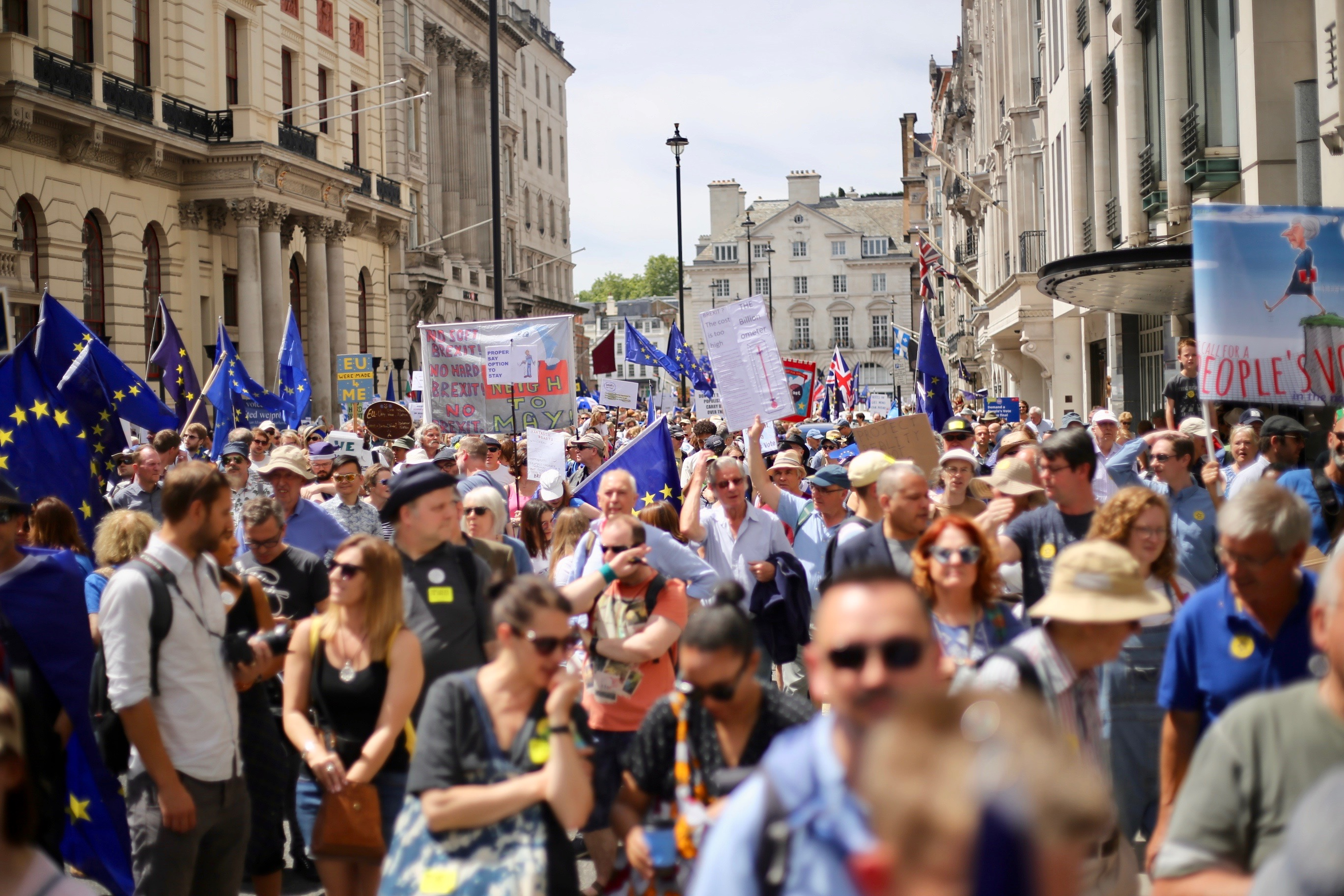
- The June 2018 London protest
- Formation: 15 April 2018; 8 years ago The Electric Ballroom; Camden, England, UK
- Dissolved: 31 January 2020
- Type: Campaign group
- Purpose: Calling for a public vote on the final Brexit deal between the United Kingdom and the European Union
- Location: Millbank Tower, 21–24 Millbank, London SW1P 4QP
- Owners: Roland Rudd; Sangeeta Kaur Sidu-Robb; Richard Reed
- Leader: James McGrory
- Subsidiaries: Open Britain (75%)
- Website: peoples-vote.uk

People's Vote was a United Kingdom campaign group that unsuccessfully campaigned for a second referendum following the UK's Brexit vote to leave the European Union (EU) in 2016. The group was launched in April 2018 at which four Members of Parliament spoke, along with the actor Patrick Stewart and other public figures.

In October 2019, there was a power struggle within the group. After the Conservative Party achieved an overall majority in the 2019 general election, the group announced that it would rebrand in 2020 to push for a fair deal following the UK's exit from the EU in January 2020.

== History ==
=== Parliamentary group ===
In July 2017, the Parliament of the United Kingdom established an all-party parliamentary group (APPG) on the UK's relations with the European Union. Co-chairs were Chuka Umunna MP (Liberal Democrats, formerly Labour and Change UK) and Anna Soubry MP (Change UK, formerly Conservative); the remaining members of the group were Caroline Lucas MP (Green), Jo Swinson MP (Liberal Democrats), Jonathan Edwards (Plaid Cymru), Stephen Gethins MP (Scottish National Party), Ros Altmann (Conservative), Andrew Adonis (Labour), John Kerr (crossbench), Sharon Bowles (Liberal Democrats), and Dafydd Wigley (Plaid Cymru).

An equivalent informal cross-party contact group was set up in the European Parliament by Catherine Bearder (Liberal Democrat), Richard Corbett (Labour), Alyn Smith (SNP), Molly Scott Cato (Greens) and Jill Evans (Plaid Cymru).

On 1 February 2018 The Guardian reported that a grassroots coordinating group (GCG) representing more than 500,000 members opposed to a hard Brexit had formed, with Umunna as its leader. Later that month it was reported that George Soros's Open Society Foundations had donated £182,000 to European Movement UK and £35,000 to Scientists for EU, two of the grassroot groups.

In March 2018, HuffPost reported that several pro-EU groups had moved into an office together in London's Millbank Tower in order to co-ordinate their campaign to retain strong links between Britain and the European Union. This was also reported to be in order to work alongside the APPG on EU Relations. Umunna commented, "In our democracy, it is vital that the people get their say on Brexit, rather than their elected representatives in Parliament being reduced to some rubber stamp for whatever plan Boris Johnson, Jacob Rees-Mogg, and Michael Gove have been putting together behind closed doors".

=== People's Vote formation ===
People's Vote was launched at an event in London on 15 April 2018, at The Electric Ballroom in Camden. The event comprised Andy Parsons with MPs Chuka Umunna, Anna Soubry, Layla Moran, and Caroline Lucas speaking, as well as actor Patrick Stewart. Lord Adonis also attended the event.

=== Campaign activities ===
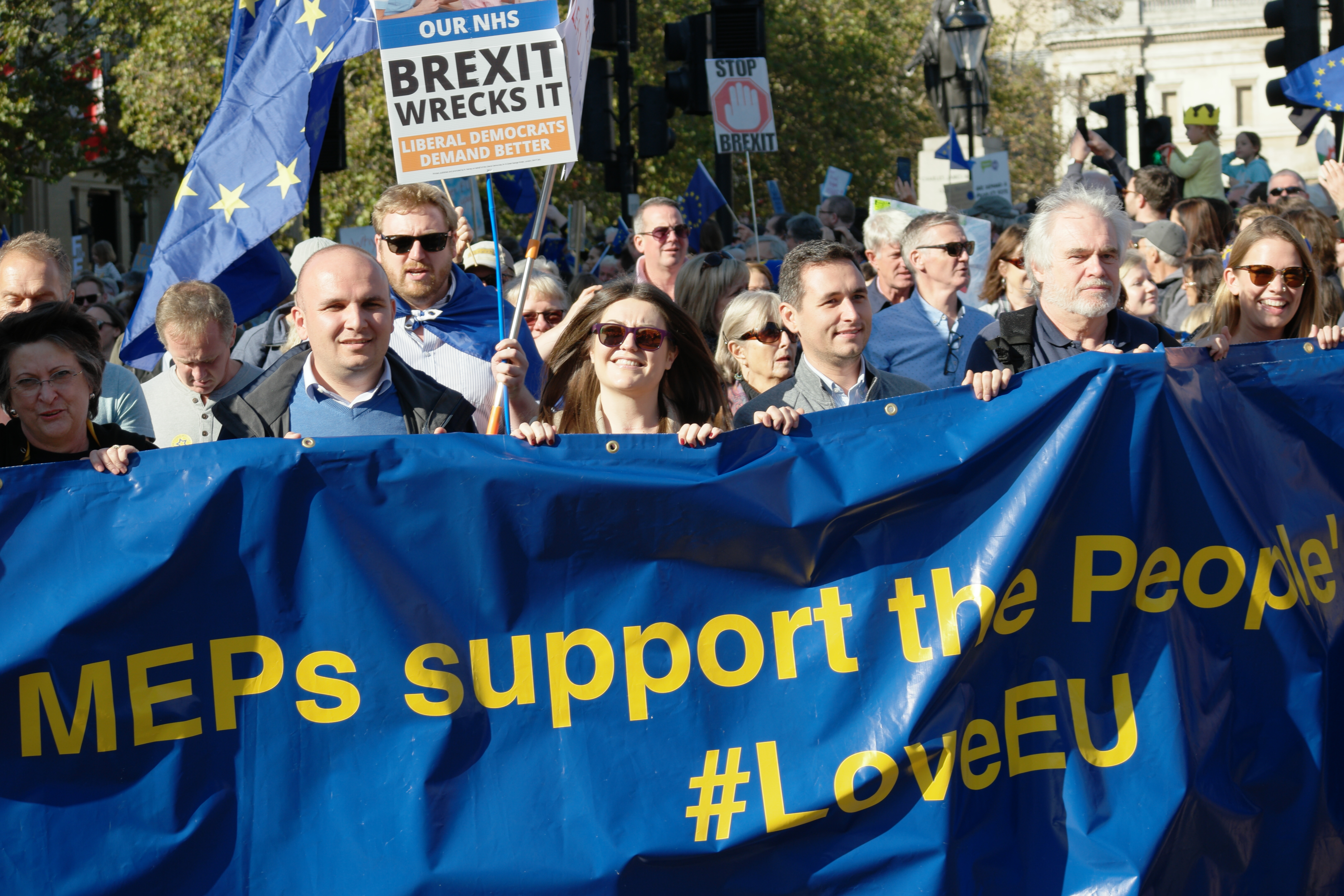
MEPs at the start of the 2018 People's Vote march

On 23 June 2018, the second anniversary of the EU referendum, People's Vote organised a march and protest from Piccadilly to Parliament Square in Central London. Speakers included actor Tony Robinson (who criticised the Labour leader Jeremy Corbyn for not attending the march), business owner Gina Miller, Liberal Democrats Leader Vince Cable, Labour MP David Lammy, the Leader of the Labour MEPs Richard Corbett, Lucas and Soubry. An estimated 100,000 people attended the march.

The Independent wrote an editorial on 24 July 2018 calling for a "final say on the Brexit deal". Over the next two weeks the television presenter Gary Lineker, the satirist Armando Iannucci, broadcaster Gavin Esler, comedian Rory Bremner, and former Liberal Democrat leader Menzies Campbell also announced their support for the campaign.

In August 2018 the co-founder of Superdry, Julian Dunkerton, donated £1m to the campaign. In the same month the Press Association reported that, according to a leaked memo, People's Vote were attempting to secure a motion calling for Labour to continue to support a second referendum.

In September 2018, BBC News reported that the Conservative MP Sarah Wollaston had given her support to the campaign. She was followed by Phillip Lee and former Government Whip Guto Bebb. Other Conservative MPs who openly support the People's Vote campaign are former Education Secretary Justine Greening and former Attorney General Dominic Grieve.

=== 2018 People's Vote March ===
On 20 October 2018, protestors marched from Park Lane to Parliament Square in support of a referendum on the final Brexit deal. The march was started by the Mayor of London, Sadiq Khan, and featured speeches by Delia Smith and Steve Coogan. Former Downing Street Director of Communications Alastair Campbell supported the march, saying "the Brexit that was campaigned successfully for [...] doesn't exist". The organisers of the march said that almost 700,000 people took part. Police stated that they were unable to estimate the numbers involved and a later police debriefing document prepared by Greater London Authority estimated the number to be 250,000. Another estimate by Full Fact gave around 450,000.

Panoramic view of the Central Hall rally, 13 November 2018

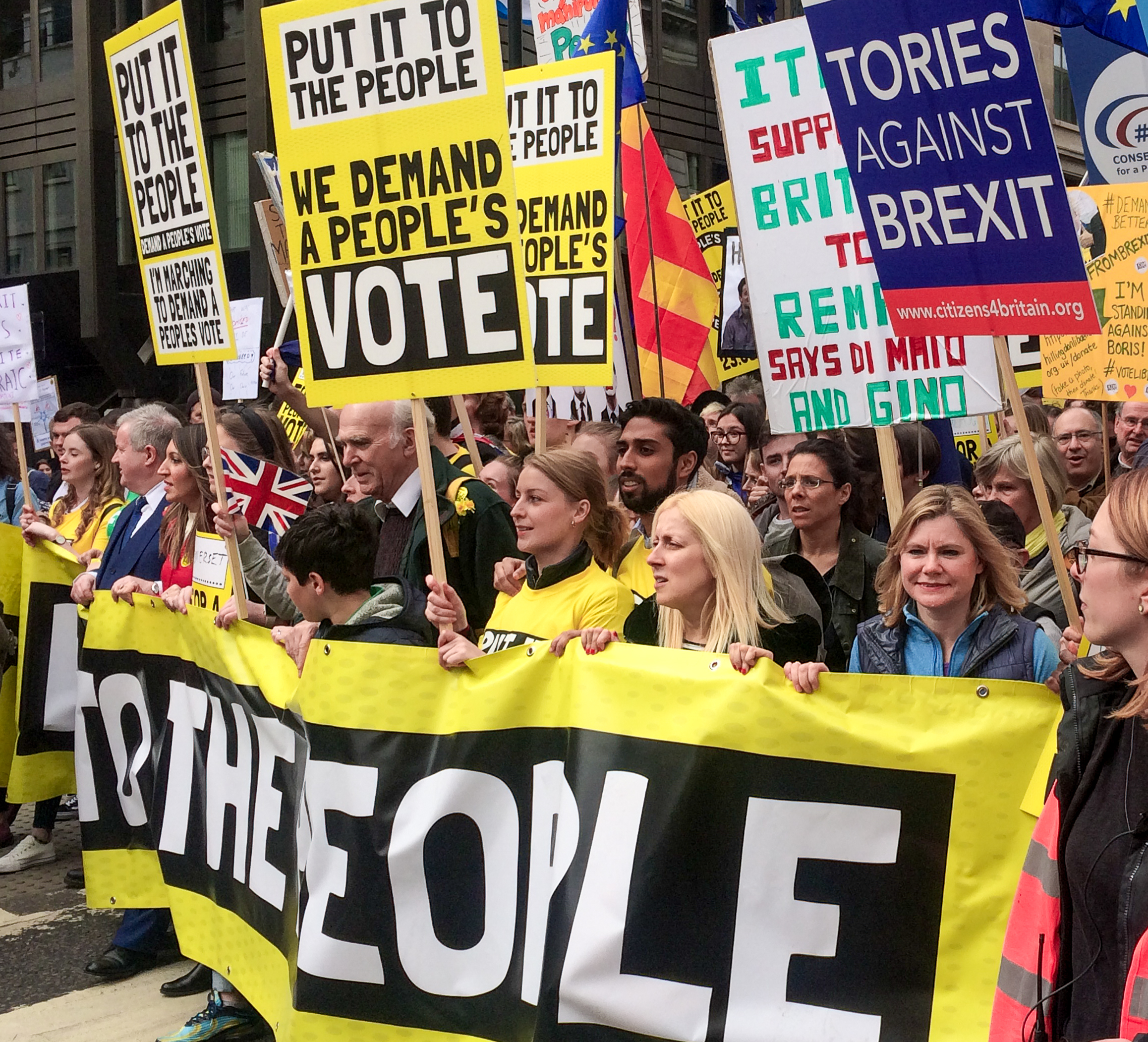
Put It to the People march, 23 March 2019

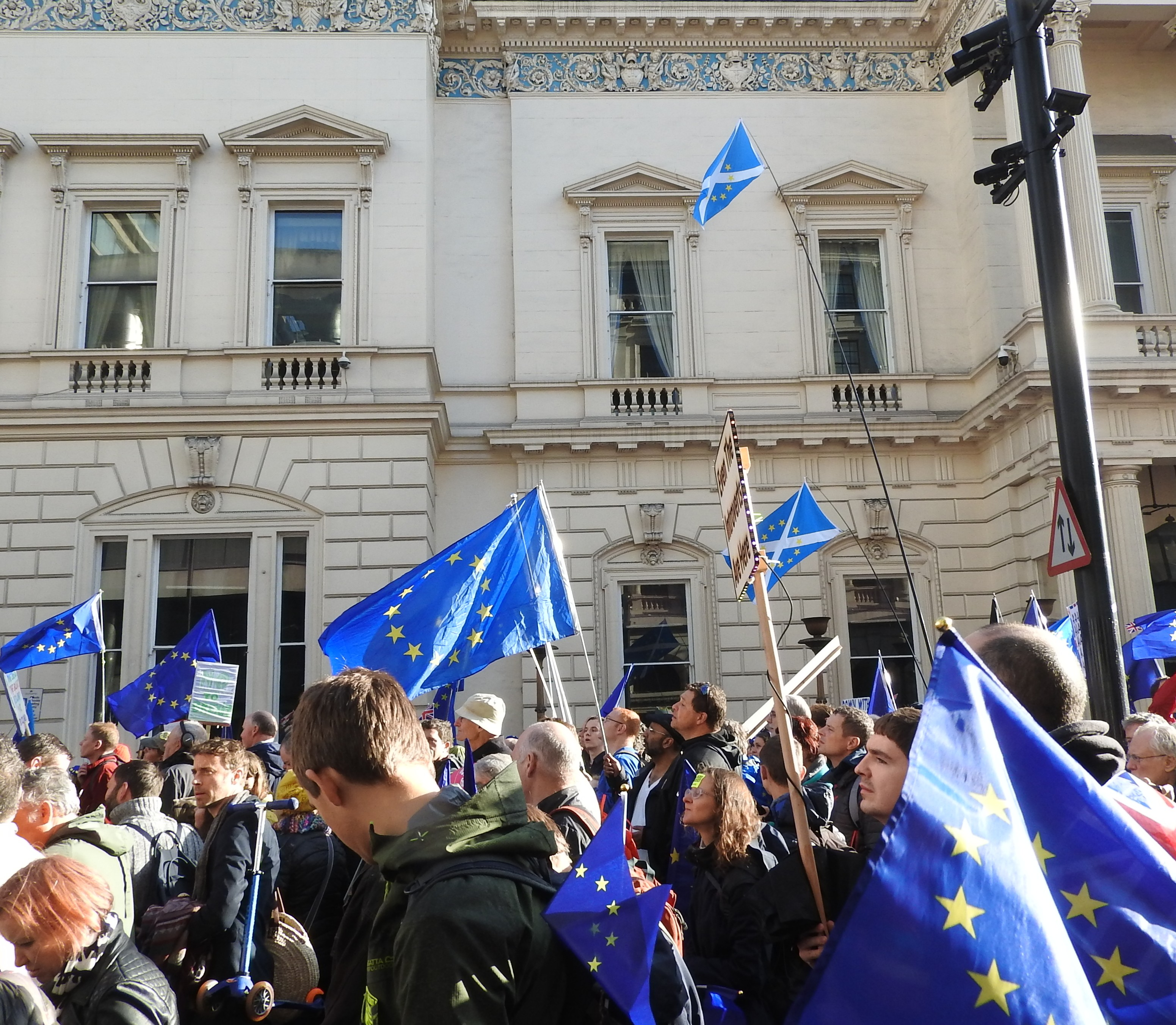
Let Us Be Heard march, 19 October 2019

=== 2018 Central Hall rally ===
On 13 November 2018, a rally organised by the People's Vote and Best for Britain groups at 3 days' notice filled the Methodist Central Hall in London. The rally was introduced by Andy Parsons and featured an interview of Jo Johnson by Gary Lineker, and speeches by MPs Anna Turley, Justine Greening, Ian Blackford, Caroline Lucas, Layla Moran, Dominic Grieve, Liz Saville Roberts and David Lammy.

=== March 2019 People's Vote March ===
On 23 March 2019, organisers said that over a million people took part in the Put It to the People march in London in support of a second Brexit referendum; independent estimates by experts in crowd estimation, researchers at Manchester Metropolitan University, put the figure between 312,000 and 400,000 people. A rally at the end of the march was addressed by SNP leader Nicola Sturgeon, Conservative peer Michael Heseltine, former Attorney General Dominic Grieve, Labour's deputy leader Tom Watson, London Mayor Sadiq Khan and MPs Jess Phillips, Justine Greening and David Lammy. An 800 square metre crowd flag was unfolded on Parliament Square revealing a 2012 quote from Brexiteer David Davis saying “If a democracy cannot change its mind, it ceases to be a democracy”, organised by anti-Brexit campaign group Led by Donkeys.

=== October 2019 People's Vote March ===
A Let Us Be Heard march took place on 19 October 2019, coinciding with a historic Saturday sitting of Parliament to debate Prime Minister Boris Johnson's latest proposed Withdrawal Agreement. Organisers claimed that one million people took part on 19 October 2019's march, although no independent verification of that figure exists at the time of writing. At the march's conclusion a crowd flag with the message "Get ready for a People's Vote" was unfolded on Parliament Square, as part of Led by Donkeys' satirical campaign mocking the government's own Get ready for Brexit campaign.

=== October 2019 internal power struggle ===
On 27 October 2019, Roland Rudd, the founder of Finsbury PR and the chair of Open Britain – one of five organisations under the People's Vote umbrella – announced he wanted to sack James McGrory and Tom Baldwin, as the campaign's director and director of communications. More than 40 staff members walked out in protest at this decision and Rudd's effort to impose Patrick Heneghan as the campaign's interim chief executive. At a subsequent staff meeting Rudd was criticised as a city PR man who had rarely been seen in the offices and a motion of no confidence in his role was passed by 40 votes to 3. Earlier, Baldwin accused Rudd of taking a "wrecking ball" to a successful campaign through a "boardroom coup" while failing to consult other organisations in the campaign such as the European Movement and For our Future's Sake. Rudd later resigned as chair of Open Britain but retained control of money and data through a new holding company he had formed for the purpose called Baybridge UK. Alastair Campbell, a former head of strategy and communications in Tony Blair's Downing Street, accused Rudd of putting his personal status ahead of efforts to stop Brexit through a new referendum.

== Organisation ==
The campaign was a collaboration between several groups. They used a campaign office based in Millbank central London, apart from Wales for Europe which is based in Wales. The European Movement UK and Britain for Europe also have roughly 150 local campaign groups.

=== List of collaborating groups ===
The main collaborating groups are:

- European Movement UK
- For our Future's Sake (FFS)
- Open Britain
- Our Future Our Choice (OFOC)
- Wales for Europe

Minor groups which once worked alongside the People's Vote campaign included Britain for Europe, Infacts, Scientists for EU.

=== Supporters ===
==== Campaign groups ====
- Best for Britain

==== Political parties ====
- Liberal Democrats
- Green Party of England and Wales
- Scottish Green Party
- Green Party Northern Ireland
- Peace Party
- Renew Britain
- National Health Action Party
- Radical Party
- Scottish National Party
- Plaid Cymru
- Mebyon Kernow
- Alliance Party of Northern Ireland
- Social Democratic and Labour Party
- Women's Equality Party
- UK European Union Party
- The Independent Group for Change
- Scottish Labour
- Labour Movement for Europe
- London Labour
- UK EPP
- Left Unity
- Advance Together

The Labour Party, Welsh Labour and the Animal Welfare Party also supported a second referendum, but did not officially endorse the People's Vote campaign.

== Criticism ==
Co-chair of Leave Means Leave, Richard Tice, branded the campaign a "losers' vote" following the London march in October 2018. Chris Bickerton, a lecturer in politics at the University of Cambridge, argued that a second referendum advocated by the campaign undermined principles of parliamentary democracy. In an opinion piece in The Guardian, he argued that the campaign promoted the idea that Leave voters in the 2016 referendum failed to understand what was at stake, a view that he characterised as elitist.

Owen Jones offered a left-wing critique of the movement; he said that despite Labour's policies and actions to support a second referendum, People's Vote still routinely attacked its former leader Jeremy Corbyn and the Labour Party, indicating a potential ulterior motive in stymying progressive voices in the United Kingdom.

== Publications ==
People's Vote commissioned a report into the economic effects of former Prime Minister Theresa May’s Brexit deal. The report, published late November 2018 by the National Institute of Economic and Social Research (NIESR), stated that the deal 'will cost UK £100bn' a year by 2030.

== See also ==
- Opposition to Brexit
- European Union Withdrawal Agreement (Public Vote) Bill 2017–19
- 2016 United Kingdom European Union membership referendum
- Reversibility of the United Kingdom's invocation of Article 50 of the Treaty on European Union
- "Bollocks to Brexit"
