= Europeans Without Borders =

European association

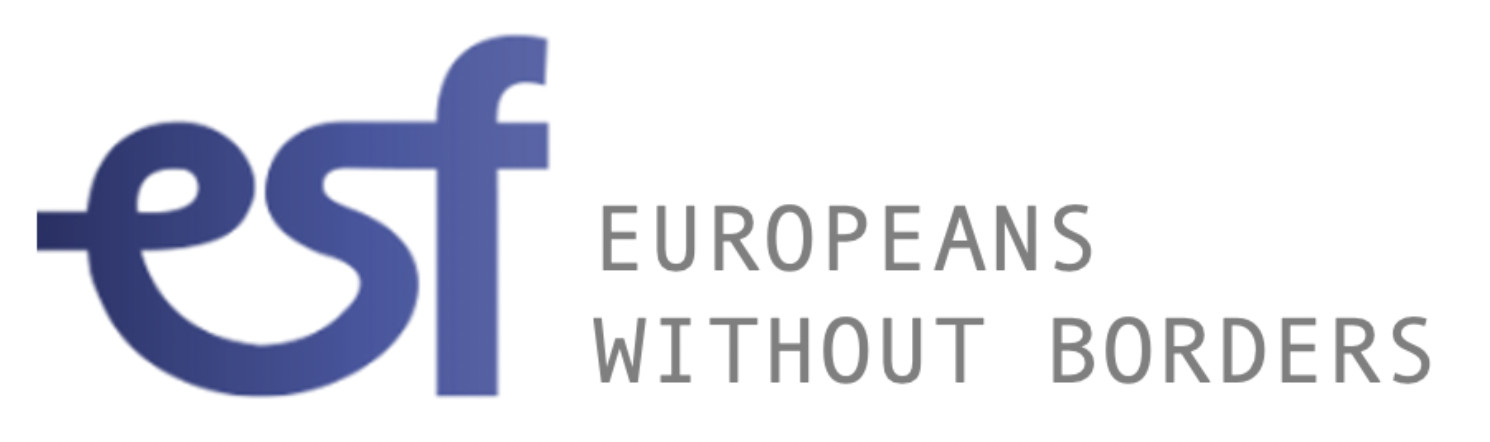
- Type: Association
- Location: Europe
- President: Phillipe CAYLA
- Website: www.europeenssansfrontieres.eu/en

Europeans Without Borders (ESF) is a European association engaged in the promotion of European citizenship, freedom of the press and media literacy, notably through cultural and educational projects based on political cartoons and press illustration.

== History ==
Europeans Without Borders is part of a broader movement within European civil society aiming to bring citizens closer to European issues through accessible cultural and media-based formats.

Its activities are aligned with the principles of participatory democracy promoted by the European Union, notably through mechanisms such as the European Citizens’ Initiative.

== Objectives and missions ==
The association’s missions include the promotion of European citizenship, the defence of freedom of expression and freedom of the press, media and information literacy, as well as the fight against disinformation, particularly among young audiences.

== Activities and projects ==
=== Caricartoons ===
Caricartoons is a European political cartoon campaign led by Europeans Without Borders on the occasion of World Press Freedom Day. The project brings together international press cartoonists and aims to raise public awareness of freedom of expression and information in Europe.

=== Media and audiovisual projects ===
Europeans Without Borders has developed several audiovisual projects in partnership with European media outlets, including Euronews, combining political cartoons and analysis of European current affairs.

The association has also initiated political cartoon and collage projects displayed in public spaces across Europe.

=== Foundation-supported programmes ===
Several projects led by ESF have received support from the Hippocrène Foundation, including Eurocartoon, InfoCartoon, Rock the Eurovote and Un couple royal.

== Partnerships ==
Europeans Without Borders collaborates with European civil society organisations, including the European Movement, as well as media and press freedom stakeholders.

== Funding ==
The association’s activities are supported by public and private funding, including European foundations and partnerships with media and communication groups.

== Media coverage ==
Projects led by Europeans Without Borders have received European media coverage, particularly in connection with campaigns related to press freedom and artistic activism.

== See also ==
- Freedom of the press
- Political cartoon
- European citizenship
