= Cold War Steve =

British collage artist/satirist

- Born: Christopher Spencer; Birmingham, West Midlands, England
- Style: Collage
- Website: www.coldwarsteve.com

Cold War Steve is the pen name of Christopher Spencer, a British collage artist and satirist. He is the creator of the Twitter feed @coldwarsteve. His work typically depicts a grim, dystopian location in England populated by British media figures, celebrities, and politicians, usually with EastEnders actor Steve McFadden (in character as Phil Mitchell) looking on in disgust. His work has been described as having "captured the mood of Brexit Britain" and has been likened to that of earlier British political satirists Hogarth and Gillray. One critic has described Spencer as 'Shit Britain's Photoshop Hogarth'. As of September 2021, his Twitter account has over 345,000 followers.

== Early life ==
Spencer was born in Birmingham in 1975. He went to art college at Nuneaton in Warwickshire, where his fellow students included film director Gareth Edwards. He then failed to get into three different universities and subsequently spent the next twenty years working a series of mundane jobs in factories and the public sector. Recovering after an attempted suicide, Spencer concentrated on his art, creating montages on his phone, often while travelling to work by bus.

== Work ==
McFadden's Cold War (the original title of the page) first appeared on Twitter in March 2016. As the title suggested, the work initially concentrated on the Cold War era, inserting Steve McFadden into photographs from the period often featuring Ronald Reagan or Mikhail Gorbachev. The EU referendum in June 2016 was a watershed in his career and led to his work taking on a more surreal tone. Speaking in December 2018 he said "rather than dealing with it as I've done in the past – which would have been drink or drugs or whatever – I channelled it more into my art. I incorporated other characters, so it's slowly become more satirical and political." The work expanded to include politicians such as Theresa May, Donald Trump, and Kim Jong-un in incongruous settings such as a run-down British working men's club or a derelict flytipping site, alongside British celebrities such as Noel Edmonds, Cliff Richard, Danny Dyer or Cilla Black. McFadden is the one constant in his montages.

He held his first exhibition A Brief History of the World (1953–2018) at The Social in London between October and December 2018. The show was attended by comedian Al Murray and Guardian cartoonist Martin Rowson.

In November 2018 his first public work, The Fourth Estate, commissioned by RRU News, was unveiled in Williamson Square in Liverpool. The work measuring 16 feet (4.9 m) is inspired by the third panel of Hieronymus Bosch's The Garden of Earthly Delights. Other large scale outdoor artwork followed at Glastonbury 2019 (a collaboration with Led By Donkeys) and a piece for the National Galleries of Scotland 'Harold, The Ghost of Lost Futures' as part of their 'Cut and Paste' exhibition which also featured work by Matisse, Peter Blake, Joan Miró, Hannah Höch and John Heartfield.

In 2019, Cold War Steve published two books with Thames & Hudson: The Festival of Brexit in March, followed by A Prat's Progress in October. A pamphlet of the early work titled McFadden's Cold War also appeared via Rough Trade Books. A third book Journal of the Plague Year was published by Thames & Hudson in October 2021.

Cold War Steve released several limited artworks and jigsaws from 2019 onwards. In October 2020, his Hellscape Jigsaw was nominated for the Design Museum's Beazley Designs of the Year prize. Harold, Trumpscape, 2020, Bluebells and Benny's Babbies all followed in the jigsaw series.

Other works have appeared in The Guardian and The Big Issue. He designed the front cover for the 17 June 2019 issue of Time and on the summer 2022 edition of the New Statesman.

In 2020, Cold War Steve featured in a documentary about his work titled Cold War Steve Meets The Outside World, directed by Kieran Evans and commissioned and broadcast by Sky Arts. The film followed Chris as he put up four large scale outdoor artworks in Medway, Liverpool, Coventry and Bournemouth. The film was shortlisted for the 2021 Grierson Documentary Awards and the exhibition was nominated for the 2021 South Bank Awards.

His work Benny's Babbies, featuring notable people from Birmingham, and named after Benny, from Crossroads is in the collection of Birmingham Museum and Art Gallery.

== Publications ==
- The Festival of Brexit (London:Thames & Hudson, 2019) ISBN 9780500022894
- McFadden’s Cold War (Rough Trade Books, 2019) RTB32
- A Prat’s Progress (London:Thames & Hudson, 2019) ISBN 9780500023426
- Journal of the Plague Year (London:Thames & Hudson, 2021) ISBN 9780500025154
- Cold War Steve Annual 2024 (London:Constable, 2023) ISBN 9781408719770

== Exhibitions ==
- A Brief History of the World (1953–2018), The Social, London, 15 October 2018 – 31 December 2018
- A Brief History of the World (1953–2018), Trades Club, Hebden Bridge, 17 January – 17 February 2019
- Cruel Britannia – Cold War Steve and Jason Williamson (Sleaford Mods), Disgraceland, Middlesbrough, 8 March 2019 – 16 March 2019
- You, Me & Cold War Steve – The International Exhibition of the People, various locations worldwide, 1 May 2020 – 1 April 2020
- You, Me & Cold War Steve – The International Exhibition of the People 2021, various locations worldwide, 30 Aug 2021 – 31 Oct 2021

== See also ==
- Led by Donkeys
