= Chaos with Ed Miliband =

British political phrase from 2015 tweet

Avatar of David Cameron

David Cameron
(@David_Cameron)
tweeted:

Britain faces a simple and inescapable choice – stability and strong Government with me, or chaos with Ed Miliband: https://facebook.com/DavidCameronOfficial/posts/979082725449379

4 May 2015

"Chaos with Ed Miliband" is a phrase from a 2015 tweet by David Cameron, then Prime Minister of the United Kingdom, targeting Ed Miliband, Leader of the Opposition. On 4 May – a few days before the 2015 general election – Cameron, the leader of the Conservative Party, wrote on Twitter that the British public faced a choice between "stability and strong Government" with him, or "chaos with Ed Miliband", who was leading the Labour Party into the election. Political turmoil in the United Kingdom after the election, especially in the wake of the 2016 United Kingdom European Union membership referendum and Cameron's subsequent resignation, made the tweet "infamous".

== Purpose and background ==
Cameron's tweet was intended to draw attention to the possibility of the election producing a hung parliament, and of the Labour Party thus entering government with the support of the pro-Scottish independence Scottish National Party.

In the televised debates leading up to the election, Cameron stated that "the only way to stop this Ed Miliband SNP government taking place is to have a Conservative majority government". Nicola Sturgeon, the leader of the Scottish National Party, appealed to Miliband in the debate: "if Labour and the SNP have more MPs than Cameron, is Miliband really going to say he won't work with us?" In response, Miliband said that "the first budget of a Labour government is going to be written by a Labour government ... It is not going to be written by Nicola Sturgeon or Alex Salmond or anybody else in the SNP" and that "If you want a Labour government, my message is very simple: vote Labour."

== Legacy ==
=== Led By Donkeys campaign ===
The tweet was the subject of a billboard campaign by the anti-Brexit political campaign group Led By Donkeys in January 2019. A spokesperson for the group told The Times that the idea for the campaign had come "down the pub" as they were discussing whether Cameron would ever delete the tweet; they decided to turn it into a "tweet you can't delete".

=== Use by Miliband ===
Miliband changed his Twitter handle to "Chaos with Ed Miliband" following the resignation of Cameron's successor Theresa May as prime minister in May 2019.

In October 2022 Miliband retweeted the tweet with an emoji of a clown after the resignation of Kwasi Kwarteng as Chancellor of the Exchequer, in the wake of the market instability and political backlash caused by Kwarteng's September 2022 mini-budget and the ensuing October 2022 government crisis during the brief premiership of Liz Truss. Miliband's retweet generated 70,000 likes in its first hour.

=== Media commentary ===
Writing for Politico in 2018, Paul Dallison listed the tweet as one of seven "tweets to regret". Dan Milmo of The Guardian listed it as one of the "greatest hits in Twitter's history" in 2022, describing it as "half-right in that it predicted bedlam. But under Cameron's leadership instead. He won, called the European Union referendum and things have been far from stable since. It is now regularly retweeted when the Tories, and the UK, are going through yet another crisis."
