= Tobias Köck =

German political and cultural scientist

Tobias Köck (born 24 April 1979 in Rosenheim) is a German political and cultural scientist and expert in digitalisation.He is vice-president (national councils) of the European Movement International since 2020 and president of the sports association RKB Solidarität Deutschlands 1896 e.V. which he represents within the DOSB. From 2017 to 2021, he co-chaired the German Federal Youth Council with Lisi Maier. He was first auditor and advisory member of the Solidaritätsjugend Germany. Between 2014 and October 2020, he was a board member of the European Movement Germany.

Growing up in Rosenheim, Bavaria, he became self-employed in IT while enrolled at the secondary school in Bad Aibling. He studied political sciences and sociology at LMU Munich and completed a Magister Artium in recent and modern history and European ethnology at the University of Freiburg in 2010.

Köck’s experience in youth association work started at Solidarity Youth, an independent youth organisation in the tradition of the workers’ youth movement based in Germany, where he served as vice federal chairman from 2006 to 2012 and still is member of the board.

Since 2009, Köck has been representing the Solidarity Youth Germany at the plenary assembly of the German Federal Youth Council. In 2013, he was elected a Board Member of Deutscher Bundesjugendring. In 2014, he served as spokesperson of the German National Committee for International Youth Work (DNK), the German Member of the European Youth Forum (YfJ). Since 2017, he has been co-chairing the German Federal Youth Council with Lisi Maier. In this position, Köck is particularly committed to European youth policy and represents the interests of DBJR/DNK at the YfJ.

From 2014 to 2020, Tobias Köck represented Youth Associations as a board member of the European Movement Germany.

In 2022, he founded the IT consulting company "wish" based in Berlin and Munich.
