= Sjouke Jonker =

Dutch politician (1924 - 2007)

Sjouke Jonker (9 September 1924, The Hague – 13 April 2007, Sierre) was a Dutch politician.

Jonker, a Protestant minister, served successively as press officer and (deputy) chief of staff to the first Dutch European Commissioner, Sicco Mansholt.
