= European Movement Belgium =

The European Movement - Belgium (EMB) is the Belgian branch of the International European Movement. As a non-profit association, open to all individuals and organisations supporting European integration, the EMB works for the promotion of a united Europe, closer to its citizens. In this context, it informs and calls on Europe and to contribute to the development of a European consciousness. Supported by its members, the EMB is independent and autonomous, with headquarters in Brussels.

== History ==
The European Movement International was founded in 1948 by pioneers of Europe such as Winston Churchill, Konrad Adenauer and Alcide de Gasperi. Politicians and idealists gathered at the Congress in The Hague with the ambitious goal of preserving Europe. This historic congress was one of the initiatives taken to definitively banish war and division from our continent and to ensure peace, stability and cooperation.

The Belgian Council of the European Movement, founded in 1949, has played an important role in European integration, especially under the inspiration of presidents like Paul-Henri Spaak and Jean Rey, respectively Chairman of the Parliamentary Assembly of the ECSC and of the European Commission.

A difficult financial situation and the European Parliament elections by universal suffrage in 1979 (which was, for some, an ideal link between the Community and its citizens) led the Belgian scuttling. The association was then dissolved when the European idea had progressed and its function of encouraging the Belgian authorities to adopt a pro-European stance was less necessary.

In 1992, in the wake of the Danish and French referendums on the Treaty of Maastricht, the European Movement in Belgium was relaunched by a few personalities like our late honorary president Willy De Clercq, after the observation of the existence of a gap growing between European integration and public opinion.

== Activities ==
The MEB organizes different activities which all have common characteristics. The aim is always to spark debate on the European Union and the form always has an educational or awareness-raising aspect. Young people often play a major role. The MEB youth committee, JEF Belgium, also organizes its own activities. Their activities take place mainly in the Belgian university towns of Louvain, Ghent, Brussels, Bruges, Louvain-La-Neuve and Liège.

To achieve its objectives, the EMB organizes a diversified program and activities accessible to a wide audience annually through Belgium :

- cultural evenings on member and candidate states to the EU;
- a Brussels Capital of Europe rally;
- public debates with Belgian and European personalities;
- radio broadcasts;
- exhibitions;
- interactive animations during Europe Day;
- open weekends at Val-Duchesse to commemorate the 50th anniversary of the Treaty of Rome (20,000 visitors).

In partnership with the youth committee and Young European Federalists – Belgium, the EMB has also introduced a range of activities for young people :

- training weekends on Europe;
- visit to European institutions in Brussels, Strasbourg and Luxembourg;
- interschool debates;
- interactive lessons on current events;
- seminars;

The European Movement – Belgium finally participates in the activities of the European Movement International.

== Structure ==
The European Movement – Belgium is one of 42 national councils of the European Movement International. It is composed of a General Assembly, a Bureau and a Board of Governors, which meets every two months. As a non-profit organization, the MEB depends on membership fees, private sponsors and grants from government institutions, which are all in favor of European cooperation.

It is made up of a General Assembly, a Bureau and a Board of Directors which meets every two months. The MEB is chaired by Wouter Beke, MEP for CD&V. He succeeded Hilde Vautmans MEP, Belgian politician and member of the European Parliament for Open VLD. She succeeded Tom Vandenkendelaere (former MEP - European People's Party Group), Olivier Hinnekens, Anne Van Lancker (former MEP - socialist group) and Charles-Ferdinand Nothomb (°1936-2023; Belgian Minister of State).

Bureau composition in 2026:

- President: Wouter Beke
- Vice-President (NL): Gino Dehullu;
- Secretary General: Ruben Lombaert;
- Head of Strategy, Policy and Institutional Framework: Lisseth Dubraska PÉREZ PEÑALVER;

Members of the Board in 2026:

- Renato SALLUSTIO;
- Mathieu VUYLSTEKE;
- Philippe ADRIAENSSENS;
- Pierre DEHALU;
- Jean-Louis HANFF;
- Andy VERMAUT.
