= European Milk Board =

International dairy farmers' association in Europe

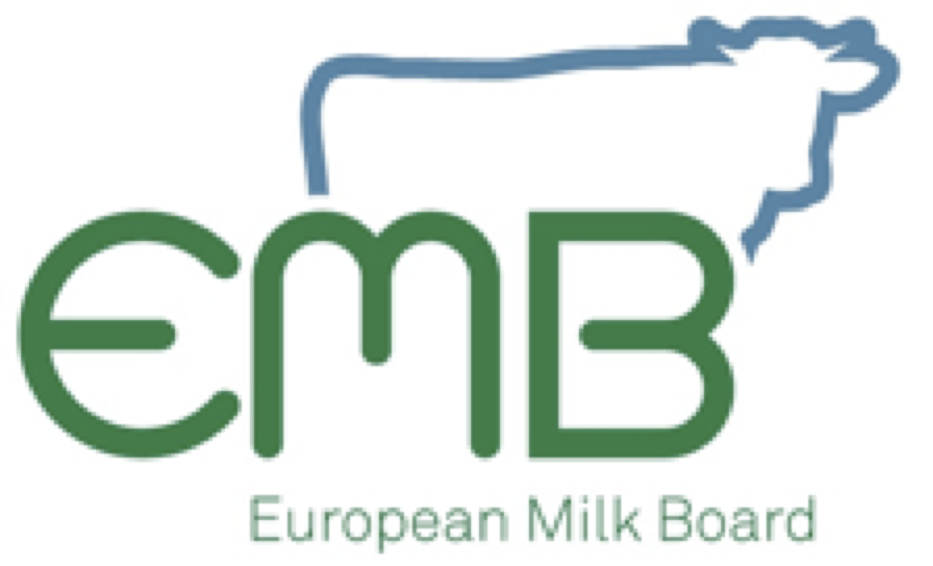
- Founded: 2006
- Region served: Europe
- Members: 21 national organizations
- Key people: Romuald Schaber (chair)
- Website: www.europeanmilkboard.org

The European Milk Board (EMB) is the umbrella organization for 21 associations representing dairy farmers in 16 European countries. Established in 2006, the EMB's main goal are farm-gate prices that cover production costs in the dairy industry.

== Organization ==
In 2022 Kjartan Poulsen was elected EMB president. The European Milk Board's first president was Romuald Schaber who was also president to German member organization Bundesverband Deutscher Milchviehhalter (BDM e.V.). Since 2012, EMB's secretariat is located in Brussels.

=== Member organizations ===
- Belgium: Flemish Milk Board (FMB), Milcherzeuger Interessensgemeinschaft (MIG)
- Denmark: Landsforeningen af Danske Mælkeproducenter (LDM)
- Germany: Arbeitsgemeinschaft bäuerliche Landwirtschaft (AbL), Bundesverband Deutscher Milchviehhalter (BDM)
- France: Organisation des producteurs de lait (OPL), Association des Producteurs de Lait Indépendants (APLI)
- Ireland: Irish Creamery Milk Suppliers Association (ICMSA)
- Italy: APL della Pianura Padana
- Croatia: Hrvatski savez udruga proizvođača mlijeka (HSUPM)
- Latvia: Lauksaimnieku organizaciju sadarbibas padome (LOSP)
- Lithuania: Lietuvos pieno gamintoju asociacijos (LPGA)
- Luxembourg: Lëtzebuerger Mëllechbaueren
- Netherlands: Dutch Dairymen Board (DDB), Nederlandse Melkveehouders Vakbond
- Norway: Bondesolidaritet
- Portugal: Associação dos produtores de leite de Portugal (APROLEP)
- Sweden: Sveriges Mjölkbönder
- Switzerland: Bäuerliche Interessengruppe für Marktkampf (BIG-M), Uniterre
- Spain: Organización de Productores de Leche (OPL)

=== Memberships in networks ===
- ARC 2020 (Agricultural and Rural Convention)

== See also ==
- Deutscher Bauernverband
