= Edge Foundation (United Kingdom) =

UK educational foundation

- Predecessor: Edexcel
- Formation: 2004
- Merger of: Edexcel
- Headquarters: Edge Foundation; Westminster Kingsway College, 211 Grays Inn Rd, London , WC1X 8RA
- Region served: UK
- Services: Education
- Chairman: Elaine Lilley
- CEO: Alice Gardner
- Website: www.edge.co.uk

Edge Foundation is an independent politically impartial UK-based educational foundation.

In 2003, educational services provider Edexcel was partially sold to Pearson PLC. The trustees of Edexcel opted to use the proceeds of the sale to set up an educational foundation, and formed Edge in November 2004. The trustees of the foundation identified the promotion of practical and vocational learning as the new organisation's primary objective. Since its inception, Edge has invested millions of pounds in practical learning schemes and initiatives run by other organisations, as well as running its own projects.

The curriculum includes interactive and practical learning, as well as technical and professional training. It also includes partnerships between educational institutions and employers.
