= European Movement UK =

Pro-Europe pressure group

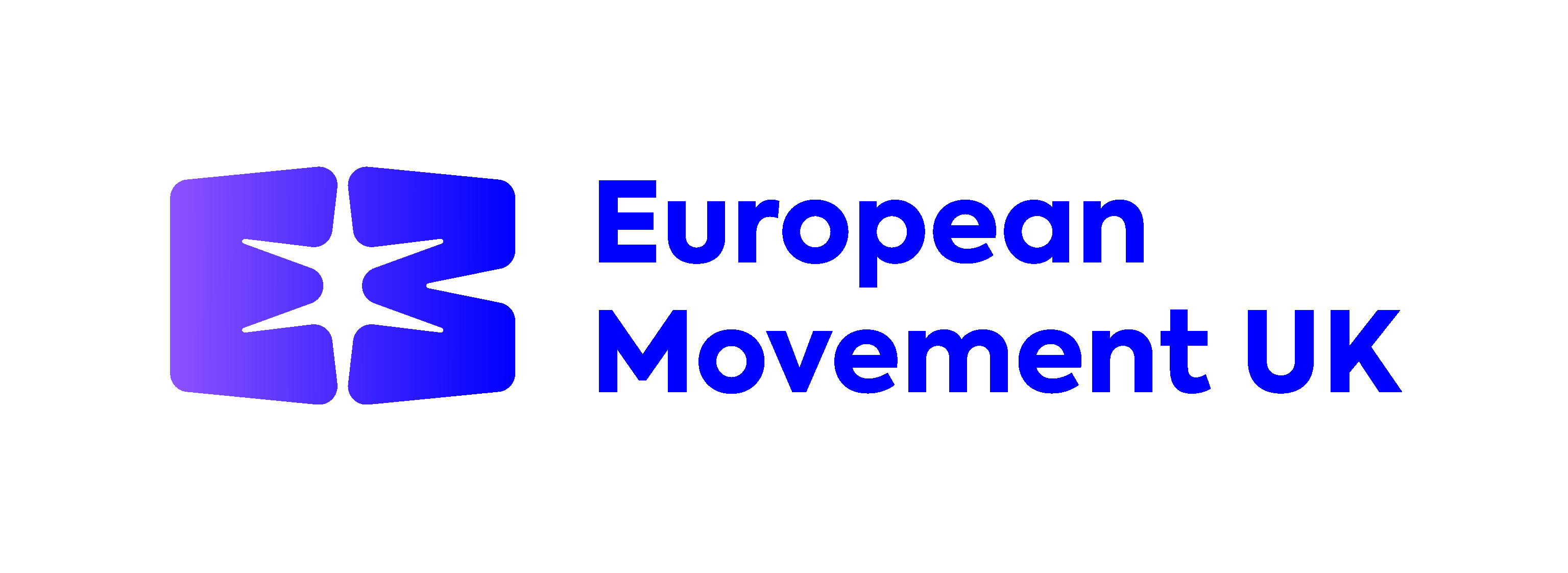
- Formation: 1949
- Type: Pressure group
- Headquarters: Audley House, 13 Palace Street, Westminster, London, SW1E 5HX
- Location: United Kingdom
- Official language: English
- CEO: Nick Harvey
- Chairman: Mike Galsworthy
- Co-Presidents: Caroline Lucas and Dominic Grieve
- Vice Presidents: Layla Moran, Marsha de Cordova, Tobias Ellwood, Stephen Gethins, Carmen Smith
- Staff: 20
- Website: europeanmovement.co.uk

The European Movement UK is a non-profit, independent all-party advocacy group in the United Kingdom which campaigns for a close relationship with the European Union, and to ensure that European values, standards, and rights are upheld in British law post-Brexit. It is part of the European Movement International which is a pan-European network of national and pan-European organisations that seeks to promote new ideas about the future of Europe. It is the most prominent pro-Europe group in Britain.

The Honorary President was Lord Ashdown until his death in December 2018. Former Deputy Prime Minister Michael Heseltine was appointed as president in May 2019. In December 2022, Lord Adonis stood down as chairman having been in the position since March 2021. Prior to him, the chairman was Stephen Dorrell. Following an election in March 2023, members of the movement voted for Mike Galsworthy to become the new chairman.

As a grassroots-powered organisation, in addition to its membership, the European Movement UK has a network of local groups which campaign regularly in local communities across the local on campaigns of local and national importance.

== History ==
=== The creation of the United Europe Movement and the Congress of Europe ===
The origins of the European Movement lie in the aftermath of the Second World War. Following a speech by Sir Winston Churchill in Zurich in 1946, his son-in-law, Duncan Sandys, organised the launch of the United Europe Movement in 1947. A 'provisional committee to further the cause of a United Europe' met on 16 January 1947 to bring together a wide coalition of supporters of European Unity from the federalists in Federal Union, a campaigning organisation set up in 1939, to supporters of intergovernmental European cooperation. This United Europe Committee was formally launched on 14 May 1947 as the 'United Europe Movement' (UEM).

Under the leadership of Sandys and Joseph Retinger, organiser of the European League for Economic Cooperation (ELEC), a committee was established to bring together several organisations working towards European Unity, including the UEM, ELEC, the Nouvelles Equipes Internationales, the European Parliamentary Union, and the European Union of Federalists. In Paris on 20 July 1947 ELEC, the UEM, the EPU and the EUF agreed to establish the Committee for the Co-ordination of the International Movements for European Unity. The EPU did not however subsequently ratify its participation in the Committee but the Nouvelles Equipes Internationales agreed to join. In December 1947, the Committee was renamed the International Committee of the Movements for European Unity and Sandys was elected its Chairman and Retinger its Honorary Secretary.

The Committee organised the Congress of Europe in the Hague in May 1948. More than eight hundred delegates from across Europe gathered, under the chairmanship of Sir Winston Churchill, to create a new international movement to promote European unity and prevent further wars between its European countries. The British section of the European Movement was founded a year later. It was also supported by Clement Attlee, the British Prime Minister. Churchill consistently made clear that he saw any 'united Europe' rooted in 'a partnership between France and Germany'. "In all this urgent work" as he put it, "France and Germany must take the lead together. Great Britain, the British Commonwealth of Nations, mighty America, and I trust, Soviet Russia....must be the friends and Sponsors of the new Europe, and must champion its right to live."

=== Campaigning activity 1970s to date ===
The British European Movement, mostly working through its Campaign Group based in Chandos House, London, worked closely with the Conservative Prime Minister Edward Heath in the early 1970s when Heath applied to join the European Union.

During the UK's European Communities membership referendum in 1975, the organisation campaigned strongly within the 'Yes' campaign and worked with the Labour Prime Minister Harold Wilson.

Other campaigns since then have included pressing for direct elections to the European Parliament in the 1970s and promoting the benefits of the single market in the run-up to 1992.

In 1997 the British European Movement promoted heavily its Europe 97 campaign (ninety-seven reasons for the UK to be in the European Union).

It campaigned for Britain to remain in the EU in the 2016 referendum and continued to oppose Brexit in collaboration with other major pro-European campaign groups such as Open Britain and Britain for Europe.

In February 2018 George Soros's Open Society Foundations donated £500,000 to a number of groups opposing Brexit including £182,000 to European Movement UK. In April the same year the group joined the People's Vote to campaign for a second vote.

== Leadership ==
=== Chairs ===
The current chair of the UK European Movement is Mike Galsworthy, who was elected to the position in 2023. The previous Chair was former Labour minister The Lord Adonis. Prior to that, chairs included former Conservative ministers Ian Taylor and Stephen Dorrell, Labour MEP Richard Corbett, Conservative MP Laura Sandys and Labour Peer Giles Radice.

== Partner Organisations ==
=== Scotland ===
European Movement in Scotland (EMiS) is a partner organisation of European Movement UK for Scotland, with reciprocal membership.

=== Wales ===
Wales for Europe has been a strategic partner of the European Movement UK since 2021. European Movement UK members in Wales are also members of Wales for Europe and Wales for Europe is represented with 6 seats on the European Movement UK’s National Council.

=== Young people ===
Young European Movement UK (YEM) is a pro-European youth organisation and the product of two parent organisations, the youth section of the European Movement and the UK section of the Young European Federalists (JEF Europe). YEM is open to membership from those aged under 35.

== See also ==
- British Influence
- Federalisation of the European Union
- Open Britain
