= Mike Galsworthy =

Anti-Brexit activist

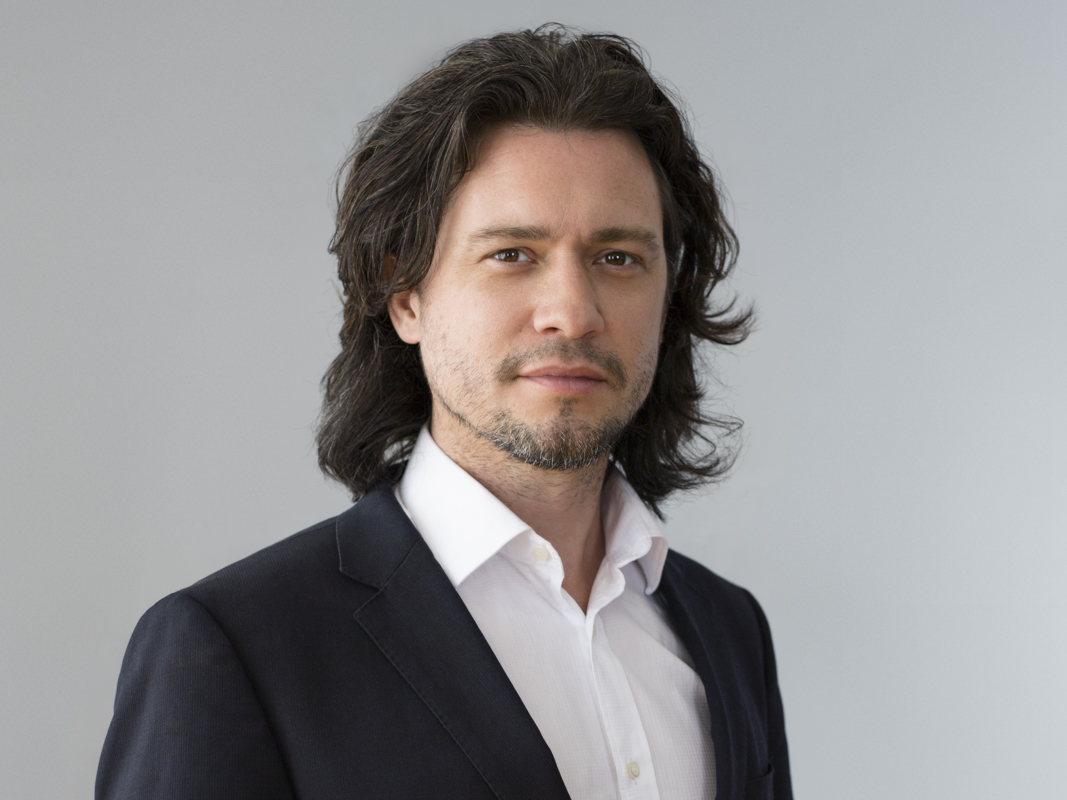
- Born: Michael John Galsworthy; 1976 (age 49–50); London, England
- Occupations: Programme Director of Scientists for EU, Visiting Researcher London School of Hygiene and Tropical Medicine
- Known for: Co-founder of Scientists for EU and Healthier IN the EU

Academic background
- Education: University of Cambridge; King's College London
- Thesis: A psychometric and quantitative genetic study of cognitive task performance in a heterogeneous stock (hs) population of MUS musculus (2003)

Academic work
- Main interests: Science policy, Behavioural genetics

Mike Galsworthy (born 1976) is the co-founder of "Scientists for EU" and "Healthier IN the EU" and a media commentator about the effects of Brexit on the scientific community in the United Kingdom, and is Chair of the European Movement UK. He is currently a visiting researcher at the London School of Hygiene and Tropical Medicine (LSHTM) and was previously Senior Research Associate in the Department of Applied Health Research, University College London (UCL).

== Early life and education ==
Galsworthy was born in London. He studied Natural Sciences at the University of Cambridge. He gained his PhD in Behaviour Genetics from the King's College London in 2003. His doctoral supervisor was Robert Plomin.

== Career ==
=== Academia ===
Galsworthy completed ten years of postdoctoral work in Switzerland and Slovenia, returning to London in June 2012 to take a position as Senior Research Associate at University College London. He is affiliated with the London School of Hygiene and Tropical Medicine as a visiting researcher. His research interests include health services research and science policy of the EU.

=== Politics ===
Since 2012, Galsworthy has been involved in initiatives in science policy and grassroots pro-European Union activism. He works full-time for Scientists for EU. He was elected chair of the European Movement UK in March 2023.

=== Scientists for EU ===
On 8 May 2015, the day after the UK general election 2015, Galsworthy co-founded the pro-EU research advocacy group Scientists for EU with fellow scientist Rob Davidson.

Galsworthy articulated two concerns that Scientists for EU aimed to address: "first, a lack of clarity and cohesion within the community on EU benefits and Brexit risks; and, secondly, a lack of public understanding on the UK/EU relationship in science." His decision to found the organization was driven by his reaction to the tone and content of the Brexit debate, which he described as a "colossal, nationwide rejection of expert opinion" fostered by "media... focused on the political soap opera, not the facts". Prior to the referendum, Scientists for EU became a high-profile organisation presenting the case for EU membership.

In March 2016, Galsworthy presented evidence on the impact of EU membership on UK science to the House of Lords Science and Technology Committee. Galsworthy answered questions about the balance between structural and competitive EU funding for science, the effectiveness of EU science collaborations, and the potential loss of influence over EU scientific regulations after Brexit. Commenting on the committee's report in April 2016, Galsworthy stated that the EU science programme offered "huge added value" to the UK and "the overwhelming balance of opinion is for remaining in."

Following the referendum, Galsworthy's immediate priority was to document its impact on the UK science community. Around 350 scientists contacted Galsworthy in relation to the future of British science after Brexit, most of whom expressed concerns about the future of research in the UK. For some, xenophobia was a significant concern. Galsworthy concluded, "It is clear that the UK has overnight become less attractive as a place to do science."

Galsworthy has continued to lobby and inform politicians and others about the negative consequences of a hard Brexit for science, including the loss of freedom of movement and the loss of influence over EU policies.

Despite the referendum result, in Galsworthy's view Scientists for EU has been successful in raising the profile of science in UK politics. In the 2017 United Kingdom general election both the Labour Party and Conservative Party election manifestos committed to raising the budget for research and development to 3 percent of gross domestic product. In Galsworthy's view, "This is a big step up from the general election of 2015 where science didn't feature. I think the referendum really helped push that onto the agenda."

In August 2018, Scientists for EU highlighted to the media that, in the event of a no-deal Brexit, the UK would lose its eligibility for three of the EU's major funding programmes. According to Galsworthy, this would mean "losing over half a billion [euros] a year in high value grants".

In a profile in Nature in September 2018, Galsworthy said that Scientists for EU had changed its focus: Instead of representing the interests of British science in the Brexit negotiations, it was partnering with People's Vote to prevent Brexit altogether. The change was motivated by the diminishing window of time for negotiations and the increasing likelihood of a no-deal Brexit.

=== Healthier IN the EU ===
Together with Rob Davidson and Martin McKee, Galsworthy co-founded Healthier IN the EU, a grassroots organization making the health case for continued EU membership.

Galsworthy and McKee co-authored an analysis of the effects of Brexit on the NHS, published in The Lancet, that predicted negative consequences for healthcare in Britain under every scenario.

=== Media ===
Galsworthy appears in the anti-Brexit documentary film Postcards from the 48% (2018).

== Political views ==
Galsworthy is affiliated with the Labour Party.

According to a profile in Der Standard, Galsworthy "persistently seeks clarification and sees it as a central science mission in the era of fake news."

He has described President of the United States Donald Trump as "a dictator in American caricature form".
