= Get ready for Brexit =

2019 British advertising campaign

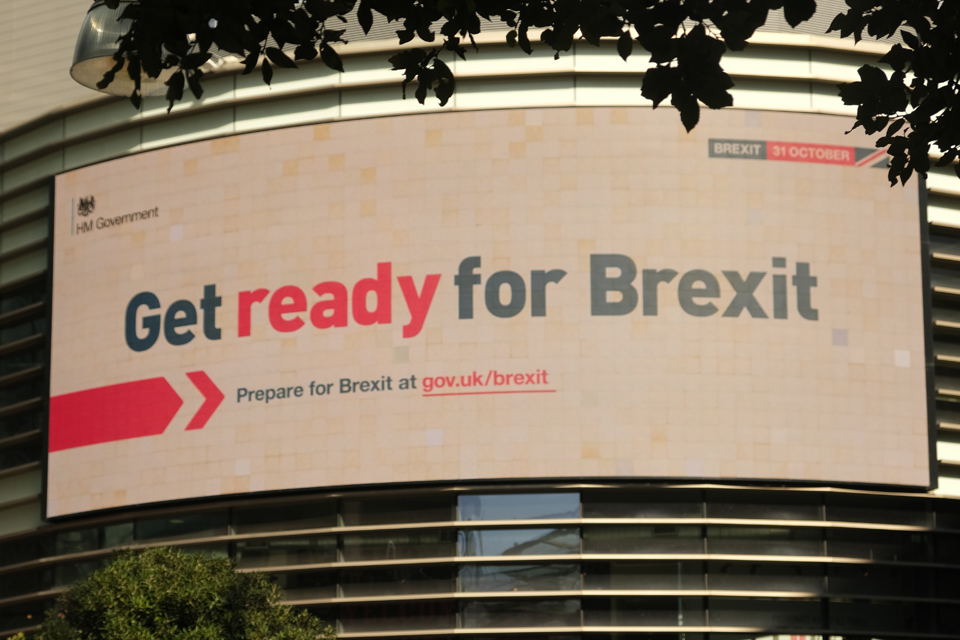
Thousands of Get ready for Brexit billboards were commissioned

Get ready for Brexit was a campaign launched by the British government on 2 September 2019. It encouraged the public to prepare for the UK leaving the European Union (EU) on 31 October. It ran across television, social media, billboards and other platforms and was the largest government public information campaign in British history.

== Development ==
The Times reported on 30 August 2019 that a taxpayer-funded advertising campaign was under development which would cost up to £100 million.

The campaign was developed by Engine Group who were appointed following Boris Johnson's election in the 2019 Conservative Party leadership contest. Manning Gottlieb OMD were hired to handle the campaign's media buying.

== Launch ==
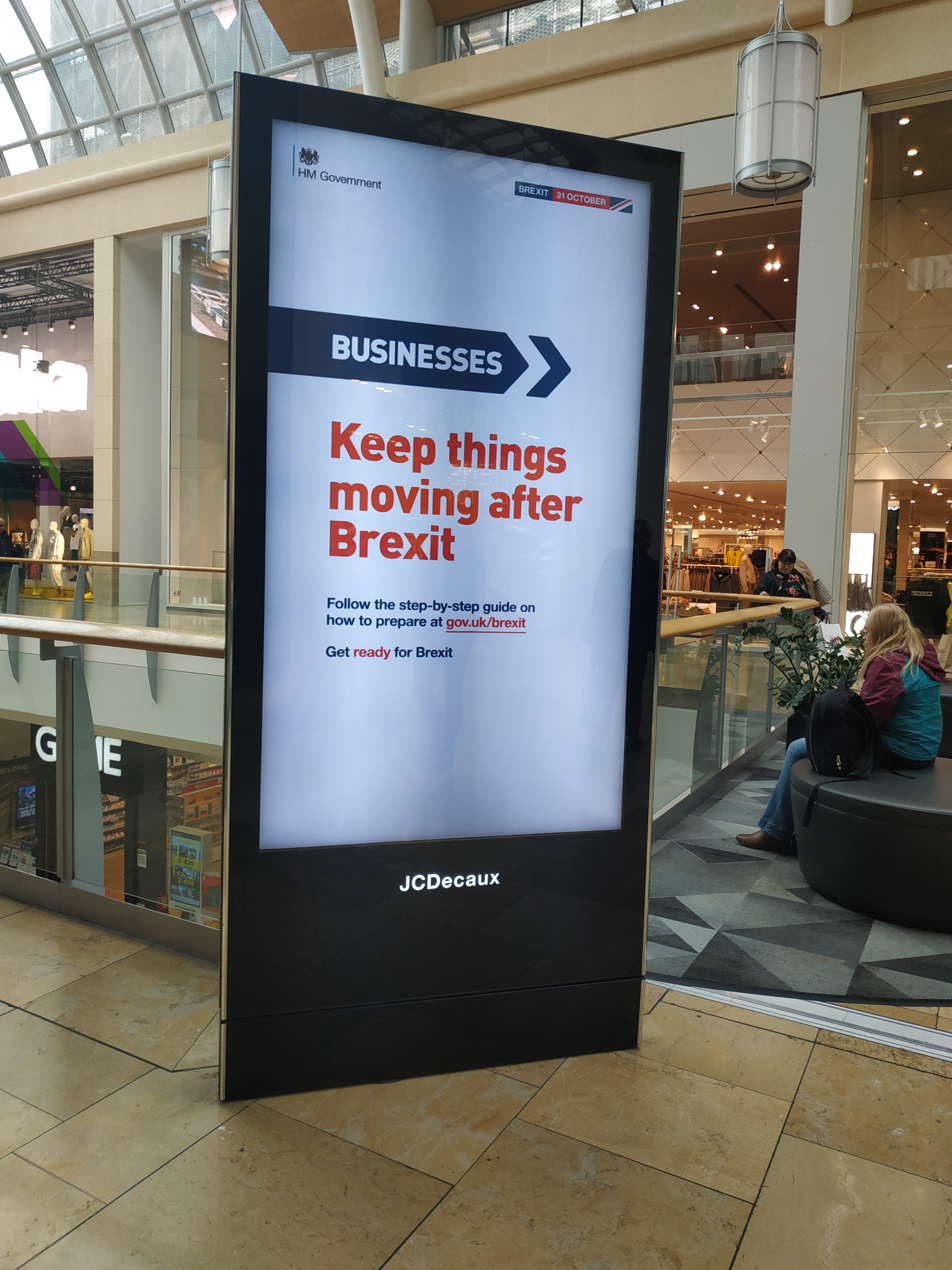
Various versions of the 'Get ready for Brexit' advertisements were produced to target different groups. This one on an electric billboard in a Cardiff shopping arcade focused on businesses.

The campaign went live on 2 September 2019.

== Reception ==
#GetReadyForBrexit was the fourth highest UK Twitter trend on the morning of 2 September 2019.

== Conclusion ==
The advertising campaign continued throughout September and October 2019 even as it appeared increasing unlikely the 31 October deadline would be met. The campaign was paused on 28 October after Boris Johnson accepted the EU's offer to extend the withdrawal process until 31 January 2020.

In January 2020, the National Audit Office reported that the government had spent £46 million on the Get Ready for Brexit campaign in October 2019. The auditors concluded that "it is not clear that the campaign resulted in the public being significantly better prepared".
