= 2009 Totnes Conservative primary =

Conservative Party (UK) parliamentary primary in Totnes, 2009
4 August 2009
- Turnout: 24.6%
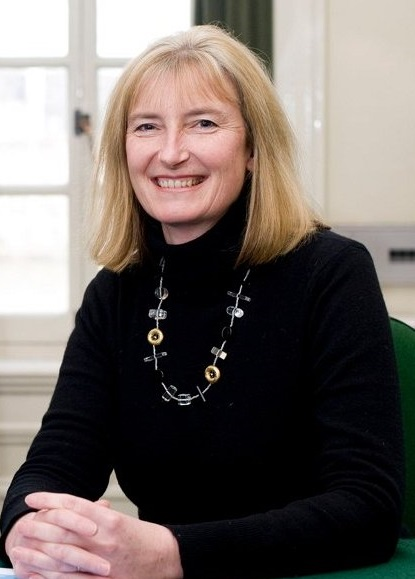

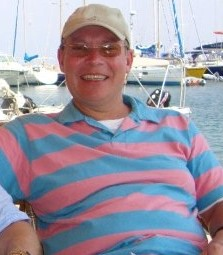
Candidate	Sarah Wollaston	Sara Randall-Johnson	Nicholas Bye
Popular vote	7,914	5,495	3,088
Percentage	48.0%	33.3%	18.7%
Elected Prospective Parliamentary Candidate
Sarah Wollaston

The Totnes Conservative Party parliamentary primary of 2009 was the 1st open primary election used to select the Conservative Prospective Parliamentary Candidate for the constituency of Totnes. The election was held on Tuesday 4 August 2009 under the first-past-the-post system. The primary was triggered by Anthony Steen's announcement that he would not stand at the next election. This came just days after details of Steen's expenses claims were published in The Daily Telegraph.

== Background ==
On 17 May 2009, The Daily Telegraph reported that Anthony Steen, MP for Totnes, had claimed over £87,000 on a country house with 500 trees On 20 May he announced that he would retire from Westminster at the next election - the day after this announcement, he told BBC Radio 4's long-running lunchtime program The World at One that the Labour Government's Freedom of Information Act was to blame for making his expenses public. He also accused his constituents of being "jealous". Later that day, Steen issued an apology.

On 8 June the Totnes Conservative Association advertised the position of Prospective Parliamentary Candidate for Totnes - the deadline for applications was ten days following this. On 10 July it was announced that the Association would organise a constituency-wide postal ballot in which registered voters, regardless of their political affiliation, could select the Conservative PPC.

== Timeline ==
2009
Thursday 18 June	Deadline for candidate applications
Tuesday 14 July	Totnes Conservative Association publish list of three shortlisted candidates
Saturday 25 July	Public hustings, moderated by Matthew Parris
Tuesday 4 August	Deadline for ballot papers to be returned. Result announced
2010
Thursday 6 May	General election

== Candidates ==
On 14 July the Totnes Conservative Association announced a shortlist of three candidates whose names would appear on the ballot. The candidates were:

- Nicholas Bye, Mayor of Torbay (2005–11)
- Sara Randall-Johnson, leader of East Devon District Council
- Sarah Wollaston, general practitioner based in Plymouth

== Campaign ==
The three candidates campaigned throughout the constituency - each registered voter received a personal leaflet from each candidate as well as the ballot paper. Sarah Wollaston capitalised on the fact that she was the only candidate to not have had a political career and, at the public hustings, avoided taking a partisan approach, which proved favourable among voters.

== Results ==
Almost one quarter of 68,000 eligible voted in the primary. Some Totnes Conservatives thought that Liberal Democrats had encouraged members to vote for Bye; if true the party raiding did not work, as he came in last. Wollaston later said "I have no doubt that I was selected because I had no track record in politics but instead had experience in the NHS, education and as a police surgeon treating victims of domestic and sexual violence", but one Conservative member told The Guardian of his fear that without a political background, she was the candidate Liberal Democrats could most easily defeat.

Ballot: 4 August 2009
Candidate	Votes	Of total (%)
Sarah Wollaston	7,914	48.0
Sara Randall-Johnson	5,495	33.3
Nicholas Bye	3,088	18.7
Spoilt	73	0.4
Plurality	2,419	14.7
Turnout	16,497	100
Wollaston elected Totnes PPC

== Cost ==
There was concern regarding the cost of the vote after it was revealed that the primary had cost Conservative Campaign Headquarters over £40,000.

== See also ==
- Conservative Party parliamentary primaries
- 2009 Gosport Conservative primary
