= Right to Vote =

British Conservative-affiliated group

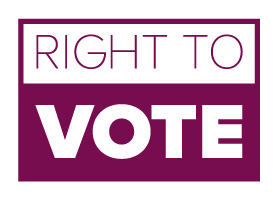
- Formation: 17 January 2019
- Founders: Heidi Allen; Baroness Altmann; Guto Bebb; Justine Greening; Dominic Grieve; Sam Gyimah; Phillip Lee; Anna Soubry; Lord Willetts; Sarah Wollaston
- Dissolved: May 2019
- Chair: Phillip Lee
- Website: righttovote.co.uk

Right to Vote was formed in January 2019 as a group of Conservative MPs and peers who advocated holding a second referendum on Brexit. In summer 2019, the group folded.

Right to Vote was founded in the aftermath of the UK government losing the first meaningful vote on its withdrawal agreement with the EU.

== Members ==
The MPs and peers in the group
Name	Constituency	Affiliation	First elected	Role
Phillip Lee	Bracknell	Liberal Democrat	6 May 2010	Chair
Dominic Grieve	Beaconsfield	Independent	1 May 1997	
Sam Gyimah	East Surrey	Liberal Democrat	6 May 2010	
Justine Greening	Putney	Independent	5 May 2005	
Heidi Allen	South Cambridgeshire	Liberal Democrats	7 May 2015	
Anna Soubry	Broxtowe	The Independent Group for Change	6 May 2010	
Sarah Wollaston	Totnes	Liberal Democrats	6 May 2010	
Guto Bebb	Aberconwy	Independent	6 May 2010	
Lord Willetts	N/A	Conservative	N/A	
Baroness Altmann	N/A	Conservative	N/A	

== Disbanded ==
In summer 2019, the Right To Vote campaign folded, with the group subsequently deleting their website. Both groups formally disbanded in January 2020.
