= Sam Gyimah =

British politician

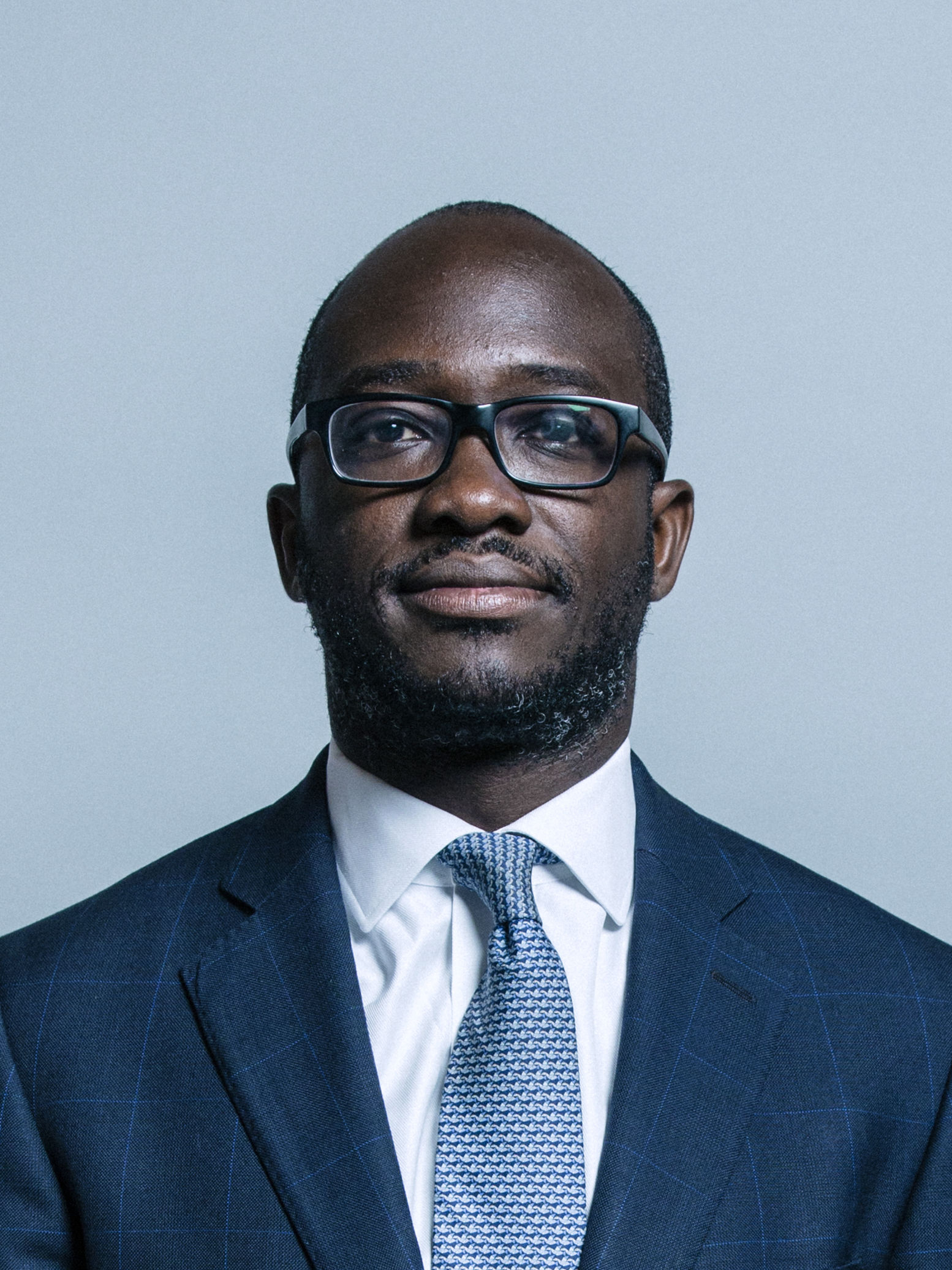
- Official portrait, 2017

Minister of State for Universities, Science, Research and Innovation
- In office 9 January 2018 – 30 November 2018
- Prime Minister: Theresa May
- Preceded by: Jo Johnson
- Succeeded by: Chris Skidmore

Minister of State for Prisons
- In office 17 July 2016 – 9 January 2018
- Prime Minister: Theresa May
- Preceded by: Andrew Selous
- Succeeded by: Rory Stewart

Parliamentary Under-Secretary of State for Childcare and Education
- In office 21 July 2014 – 17 July 2016
- Prime Minister: David Cameron
- Preceded by: Liz Truss
- Succeeded by: Caroline Dinenage

Parliamentary Secretary for the Constitution
- In office 14 July 2014 – 12 May 2015
- Prime Minister: David Cameron
- Preceded by: Greg Clark
- Succeeded by: John Penrose

Lord Commissioner of the Treasury
- In office 7 October 2013 – 14 July 2014
- Prime Minister: David Cameron
- Preceded by: Desmond Swayne
- Succeeded by: Harriett Baldwin
Liberal Democrat frontbench positions
Liberal Democrat Spokesperson for Business, Energy and Industrial Strategy
In office 21 October 2019 – 13 December 2019
Leader	Jo Swinson
Preceded by	Ed Davey
Succeeded by	Sarah Olney (Business and Industrial Strategy); Wera Hobhouse (Energy and Climate Change)

Member of Parliament for East Surrey
- In office 6 May 2010 – 6 November 2019
- Preceded by: Peter Ainsworth
- Succeeded by: Claire Coutinho

Personal details
- Born: Samuel Phillip Gyimah; 10 August 1976 (age 50) Beaconsfield, Buckinghamshire, England
- Party: Liberal Democrats (2019–present)
- Other political affiliations: Conservative (1999–2019)
- Spouse: Nicky Black (m. 2012)
- Children: 2
- Education: Somerville College, Oxford (BA)
- Website: www.samgyimah.london

Samuel Phillip Gyimah ( /ˈdʒiːmɑː/; born 10 August 1976) is a British politician and banker who served as the Member of Parliament (MP) for East Surrey from 2010 to 2019. First elected as a Conservative, Gyimah rebelled against the government to block a no-deal Brexit and had the Conservative whip removed in September 2019. He subsequently joined the Liberal Democrats and stood unsuccessfully for them in Kensington at the 2019 general election. Gyimah now serves on the board of Goldman Sachs International.

Between 2014 and 2018, after serving as Parliamentary Private Secretary to the Prime Minister, David Cameron, and as a government whip, Gyimah was promoted to Parliamentary Under-Secretary of State. He served as the Minister for Universities, Science, Research and Innovation from January 2018 until he resigned on 30 November 2018 in protest at Theresa May's Brexit withdrawal agreement.

== Early life ==
Gyimah was born on 10 August 1976 in Beaconsfield, Buckinghamshire. His father Samuel was a GP, and his mother Comfort Mainoo was a midwife. When he was six years old, his parents split up and his mother returned to her native Ghana with Gyimah and his younger brother and sister while his father remained in the UK. For the next ten years, Gyimah attended Achimota School in Accra, Ghana. Gyimah returned to the UK to sit GCSEs and A-levels at Freman College, a state school in Buntingford, Hertfordshire. He then went on to Somerville College at the University of Oxford, where he read Politics, philosophy and economics, and was elected President of the Oxford Union in 1997.

== Life and career ==
On graduation, Gyimah joined Goldman Sachs as an investment banker, leaving the company in 2003 to set up Clearstone Training and Recruitment Limited with fellow future Conservative MP Chris Philp. Gyimah was voted CBI Entrepreneur of the Future 2005. Clearstone and its subsidiaries went into administration in 2007, owing nearly £4 million. In September 2005 Gyimah edited a report by the Bow Group, a Conservative think tank, entitled From the Ashes: the future of the Conservative Party. He was subsequently elected chairman of the Bow Group from 2006 to 2007. Gyimah stood unsuccessfully for election in Kilburn ward in the 2006 Camden Council election. In December 2009, Gyimah placed third in the Gosport primary election to succeed Peter Viggers, losing to Caroline Dinenage.

== Parliamentary career ==
=== Conservative MP (2010–2019) ===
Following his name being added to the Conservatives' A-List, he was selected as the prospective parliamentary candidate for East Surrey and elected at the 2010 general election, making his maiden speech on 29 July 2010. Gyimah became a member of the International Development Select Committee, and stated an interest in harnessing the private sector towards achieving international development goals. He also began to take an active part in debates on education and employment and in some local campaigns to protect the green belt in Surrey.

In 2011, Gyimah produced a report with the think-tank NESTA, "Beyond the Banks: the case for a British Industry and Enterprise Bond", in support of non-bank alternatives for businesses seeking finance. He was the first member of parliament to call for credit-easing as a means of accelerating Britain's economic recovery.

Gyimah was appointed as Parliamentary Private Secretary (PPS) to the Prime Minister at the 2012 reshuffle, then became a Government Whip in October 2013, supporting the Prime Minister during the Cameron–Clegg coalition. He supported the United Kingdom remaining in the European Union in the EU referendum of 2016.

Gyimah was Childcare and Education Minister during the progress of the 2015–2016 Childcare Bill, designed to deliver 30 hours per week of funded childcare for working parents of 3 and 4 year olds. The Childcare Bill also required local authorities to publish information about local childcare availability for parents and caregivers. The bill became law as the Childcare Act on 16 March 2016.

On 20 November 2015, Gyimah contributed to the filibustering of the opposition-proposed Compulsory Emergency First Aid Education (State-Funded Secondary Schools) Bill to make the teaching of first aid in secondary schools compulsory. He spoke until the end of the debate, despite requests from the deputy speaker. Gyimah was quoted as being concerned to not overload the National Curriculum.

On 4 July 2016, as Childcare and Education Minister, Gyimah launched Millie's Mark, a voluntary quality mark described as "the new gold standard" for nursery providers that trained all their staff in pediatric first aid.

On 21 October 2016, Gyimah filibustered the Sexual Offences (Pardons) bill (nicknamed the "Turing Bill" after Alan Turing), a private member's bill presented by the Scottish National Party MP John Nicolson that sought to pardon all men convicted of abolished offences under the sodomy laws, on the grounds that granting automatic pardons to all men convicted of historic 'gay sex crimes' would mean that some men who had raped and/or had sex with young men under the age of 16 would be pardoned. Supporters of the bill disputed this, as they proposed conditions for a pardon which included the act being consensual and that it would not be contrary to present-day British law. He instead supported an amendment proposed by the government to existing legislation, in which only dead men convicted of such offences were automatically pardoned, while those who were living would have to apply to the Home Office through a "disregard" process whereby the Secretary of State must be satisfied that the conduct is no longer criminal. The "Turing Bill" became law on 31 January 2017.

Other than the aforementioned Turing Law, Gyimah has consistently voted in favour of LGBT equality, including the right of same-sex couples to marry in all of the United Kingdom, including Northern Ireland.

As Minister for Universities, Science, Research and Innovation, Gyimah toured university campuses around the country for question-and-answer-sessions with students, staff and the public. He called on Higher Education leaders to prioritize student mental health, and spoke of his own financial struggles as an undergraduate. Gyimah has warned that "there's a culture of censorship in some of our universities" and that threats to freedom of speech were not "some right-wing conspiracy theory that had been made up". Some of the examples he has mentioned included a professor at King's College London who was allegedly reported for hate speech after teaching a history class, and a university's safe-space policy that took twenty minutes to read. In both cases, the universities in question reported that these things did not happen, and the Department for Education clarified later that Gyimah had merely relayed students' anecdotes.

On 30 November 2018, Gyimah became the seventh government minister to resign over Theresa May's Brexit deal, which he called naive, saying: "Britain will end up worse off, transformed from rule makers into rule takers. It is a democratic deficit and a loss of sovereignty". He called May's withdrawal agreement "a deal in name only" with many unresolved issues that would leave the UK at the mercy of the European Union with no leverage for many years to come.

He said the UK's weakness in the negotiations over the Galileo satellite navigation project was the final straw and he intended to vote against May's deal in the House of Commons on 11 December 2018, and suggested the public should have the right to a final say on the withdrawal agreement in another referendum with the Article 50 process extended. Gyimah resigned as a minister because he wanted to be free to endorse a second referendum on Brexit. In early 2019, he co-founded the group Right to Vote.

On 2 June 2019, Gyimah announced his intention to stand as a candidate for the Conservative Party leadership election. He was the only leadership candidate advocating a second referendum. He withdrew on 10 June, the day that candidatures were to be formalised.

=== Conservative whip withdrawal and joining the Liberal Democrats ===
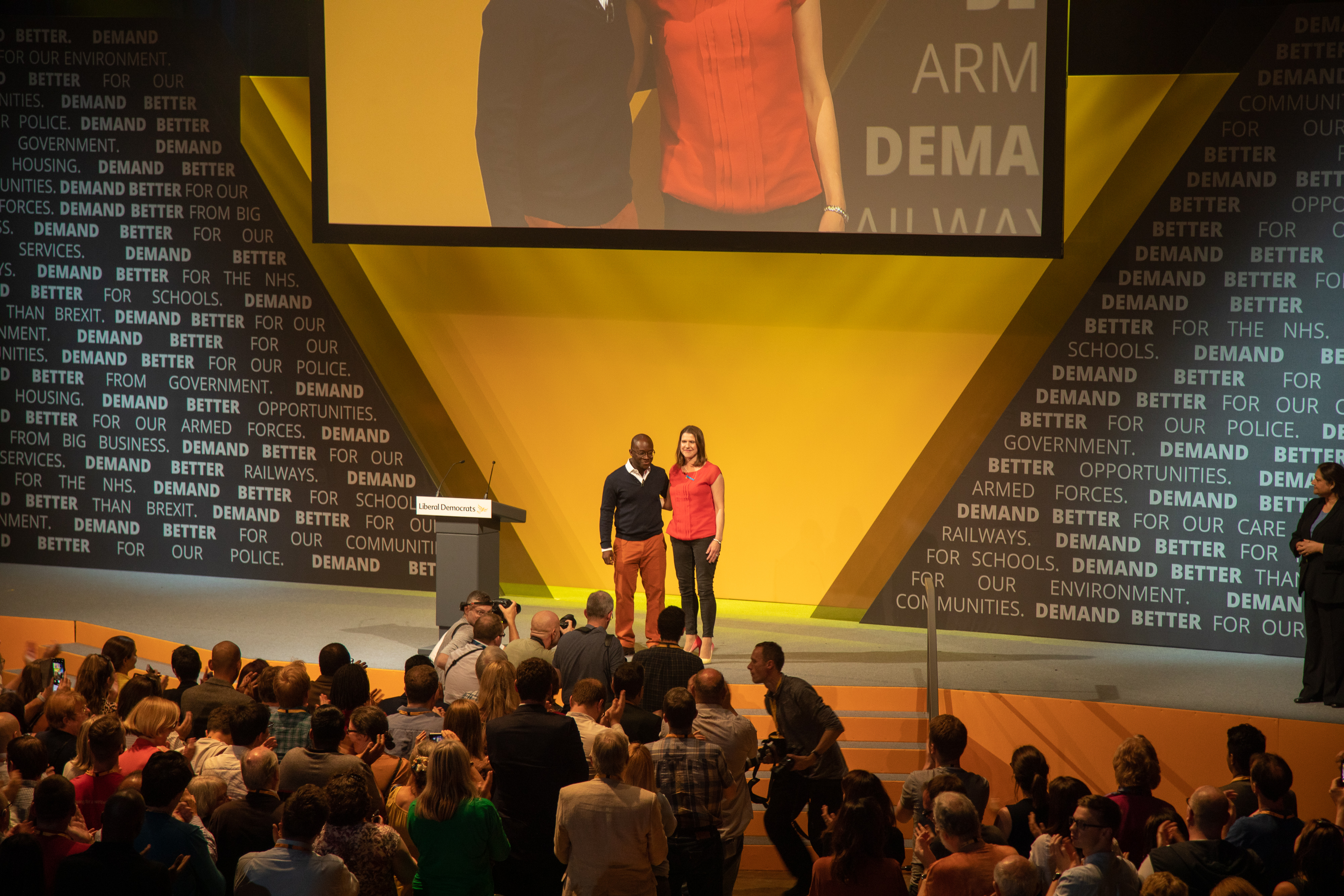
Gyimah with Liberal Democrat leader Jo Swinson at the 2019 Lib Dem autumn conference

On 3 September 2019, Gyimah joined twenty other rebel Conservative MPs to vote against the Conservative government of Boris Johnson. The rebel MPs voted with the Opposition against a Conservative motion which subsequently failed. Effectively, they helped block Johnson's "no deal" Brexit plan from proceeding on 31 October. Subsequently, all 21 were advised that they had lost the Conservative whip, expelling them as Conservative MPs, requiring them to sit as independents. Before the vote Gyimah had described Johnson's position as: "For MPs like myself, Downing Street has framed the choice as: speak your mind or keep your job." If they decided to run for re-election in a future election, the Party would block their selection as Conservative candidates.

On 14 September, he joined the Liberal Democrats and was appointed their Shadow Secretary for Business, Energy and Industrial Strategy the following month. In December at the 2019 general election, he stood for the Liberal Democrats in Kensington, finishing third with 21% of the vote.

== After Parliament ==
In August 2020, Gyimah joined the board of Oxford University Innovation, a technology transfer and consultancy company created to manage the research and development of university spin-offs.

In September 2020, he presented a programme about the future of higher education in Britain on BBC Radio 4.

In October 2020, Sam Gyimah re-joined Goldman Sachs where he started his career, as a non-executive director of Goldman Sachs International and Goldman Sachs International Bank.

== Personal life ==
In 2012, Gyimah married Nicky Black, with whom he has a son and a daughter. They knew each other at Oxford, where she was also an Oxford Union president, before they reconnected after university. She is a Hong Kong-raised New Zealander. Black previously worked for mining company De Beers, as well as a former director for social and economic development at the International Council on Mining and Metals.

Gyimah has been a volunteer and fundraiser for Crisis, the Down's Syndrome Association and St. Catherine's Hospice in Surrey. He has served as school governor of an inner London school, on the board of a housing association and on the development board of Somerville College. He is a vice-president of the Young Epilepsy charity (formerly the National Centre for Young People with Epilepsy) in Lingfield, Surrey.

Parliament of the United Kingdom
Preceded by Peter Ainsworth	Member of Parliament for East Surrey; 2010–2019	Succeeded by Claire Coutinho
