= Sarah Wollaston =

British Liberal Democrat politician

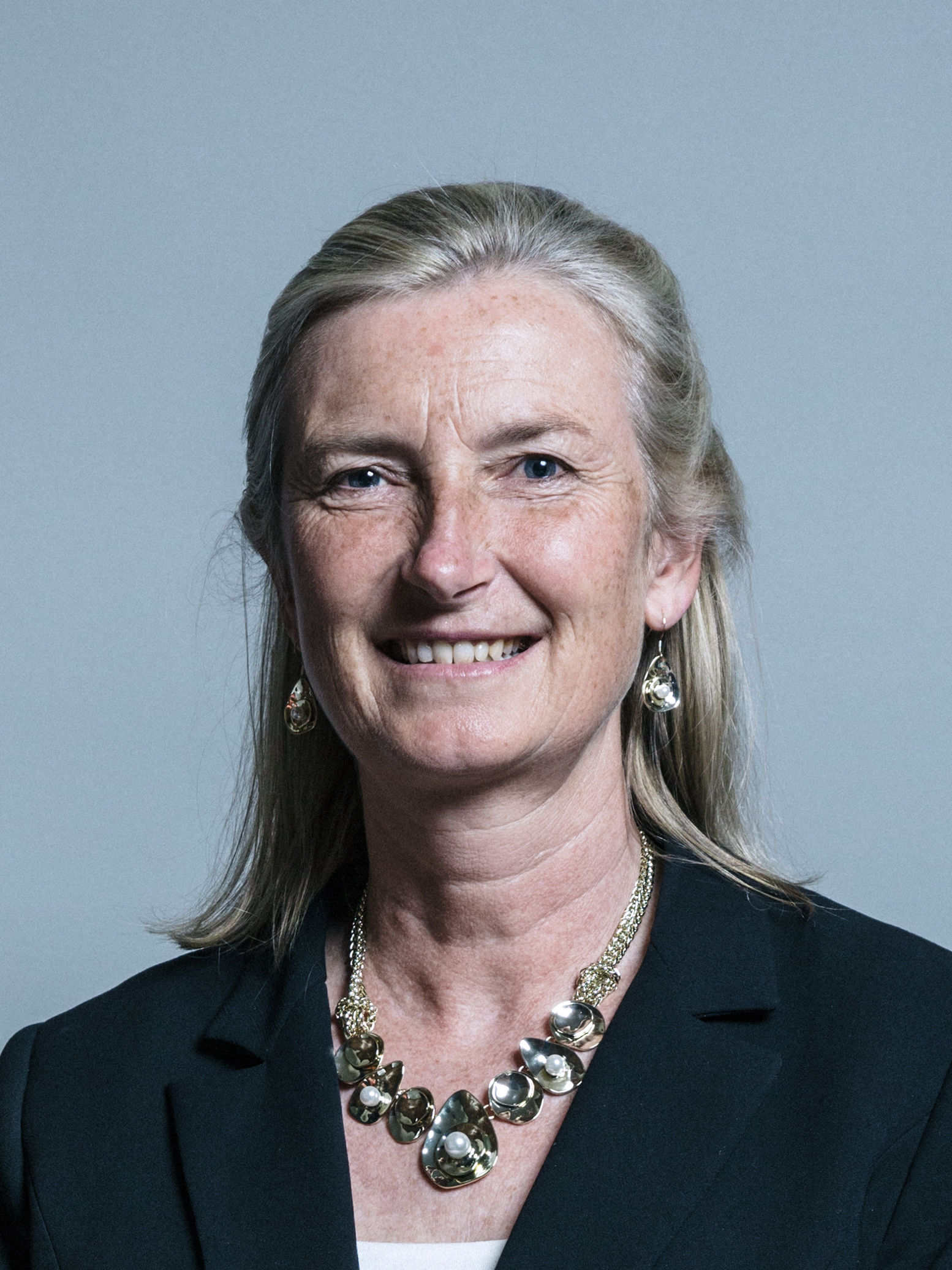
- Official portrait, 2017

Chair of the Liaison Committee
- In office 13 November 2017 – 6 November 2019
- Preceded by: Andrew Tyrie
- Succeeded by: Bernard Jenkin

Chair of the Health Select Committee
- In office 18 June 2014 – 6 November 2019
- Preceded by: Stephen Dorrell
- Succeeded by: Jeremy Hunt

Member of Parliament for Totnes
- In office 6 May 2010 – 6 November 2019
- Preceded by: Anthony Steen
- Succeeded by: Anthony Mangnall

Personal details
- Born: 17 February 1962 (age 64) Woking, Surrey, England
- Party: Liberal Democrats (since 2019)
- Other political affiliations: Change UK (2019); Conservative (until 2019)
- Spouse: Adrian James (m. 1988)
- Children: 3
- Education: King's College London Guy's Hospital Medical School
- Profession: General practitioner
- Website: www.drsarah.org.uk

Sarah Wollaston (born 17 February 1962) is a British former Liberal Democrat politician who served as Member of Parliament (MP) for Totnes from 2010 to 2019. First elected for the Conservative Party, she later served as a Change UK and Liberal Democrat MP. She was chair of the Health Select Committee from 2014 to 2019 and chair of the Liaison Committee from 2017 to 2019.

Wollaston was born in Woking, Surrey, and studied medicine at Guy's Hospital Medical School. She qualified in 1986 and worked as a junior hospital doctor and then as a general practitioner (GP). After more than 20 years in clinical practice, she ran for political office. She was selected as the Conservative parliamentary candidate for Totnes through an open primary; during the campaign, she emphasised that she was not a career politician and had a professional career. At the 2010 general election, she won the seat with an increased majority, increasing it further in 2015. She rebelled against the Cameron–Clegg government on several key votes – voting in favour of a referendum on British membership of the European Union in 2011, for a cut in the EU budget in 2011, and against military intervention in Syria in 2013. In Westminster, she was a vocal proponent of minimum unit pricing for alcohol and spoke out against political patronage.

Initially uncertain about which way to vote in the referendum, Wollaston announced in June 2016 that she was no longer supporting the Vote Leave campaign in the referendum on European Union membership and would vote to remain in the EU. In February 2019, she resigned from the Conservatives, along with two of her peers, and joined The Independent Group, later Change UK. Four months later, she quit the party to sit as an independent MP. In August 2019, she joined the Liberal Democrats but lost her seat in the 2019 general election standing as a Liberal Democrat.

== Early life and education ==
Wollaston was born in February 1962 in Woking, Surrey, into a military family. Her family moved frequently during her early years as her father – a supplies and catering officer in the Royal Air Force, formerly a diver and bomb disposal specialist in the Royal Navy – was posted around the world, including Hong Kong and Malta.

Wollaston was educated at service and civilian primary schools, later attending a girls' grammar school in Watford, where she was Head Girl in 1979–1980. Whilst at secondary school, Wollaston took on a range of part-time jobs, including a Saturday job at her local branch of John Lewis. She left sixth form with high grades in science subjects at A-level, which she needed to study Medicine at university.

== Medical career ==
In 1980, Wollaston entered Guy's Hospital Medical School in London as a medical student. She took an intercalated degree in pathology in the third year of her undergraduate career, gaining a Bachelor of Science degree in the subject. While at Guy's, she met her future husband, Adrian. Alongside her studies, she took a part-time role as a healthcare assistant at the hospital to supplement her student grant.

Wollaston graduated with a degree in Medicine in 1986. She embarked on a career in hospital paediatrics but, after five years as a junior doctor in London, she moved to Bristol to train as a general practitioner, qualifying as a family doctor in 1992.

Wollaston then moved to Devon to work as a part-time GP in a town on the edge of Dartmoor. She was also a police surgeon from 1996 to 2001, dealing with victims of sexual assaults, advising the police on whether suspects were fit to be interviewed, and treating people in custody. After 1999, she became a full-time GP; she taught medical students and trainee GPs, and worked as an examiner for the Royal College of General Practitioners.

Wollaston remains on the medical register, but ceased practising medicine in 2010 on her election to Parliament.

== 2009 open primary and selection ==
Wollaston joined the Conservative Party in 2006, having been spurred into politics by her opposition to the threatened closure of Moretonhampstead Community Hospital. However, Wollaston accepted that she had "no background in politics" when in 2009 she put her name forward for the selection of a candidate for the Totnes constituency, citing as qualifications "only real life experience, approachability and enthusiasm". The Conservative Association placed her on the shortlist of three to succeed Anthony Steen, who had announced his retirement following criticism as part of the United Kingdom parliamentary expenses scandal.

Urged to do so by the national party, the local Conservative Association had already decided that the selection would be made by an open primary, in which non-members would have a vote. On 9 July, the Conservative Party leader David Cameron announced that the party would, for the first time, send a postal ballot paper to every voter instead of holding the selection at an open meeting. Wollaston later said that she might not have put her name forward had she known that the selection was to be by open primary.

During the selection process, Wollaston campaigned on the problems of alcohol-related crime, citing also the 8,000 annual deaths from alcohol. She later supported curbs on low priced alcoholic drinks. but highlighted that the selection offered voters a choice between a career politician and "someone with a real job". At a public hustings, she was asked whether her lack of political experience would make it difficult for her to throw and take political punches; she replied that this was not what politics was about for her, and that she would not indulge in it. Her reply prompted spontaneous applause.

The primary was conducted under the plurality ("first past the post") method used in general elections. In the selection result, Wollaston was proclaimed the winner with 7,914 votes (48%), ahead of Sara Randall Johnson (leader of East Devon District Council) who had 5,495 (33%), and Nick Bye (Mayor of Torbay) who had 3,088 (19%). Nearly a quarter of all voters returned their ballots, a higher turnout than was expected.

Wollaston later said "I have no doubt that I was selected because I had no track record in politics", but one Totnes Conservative member told The Guardian of his fear that without a political background, she was the candidate Liberal Democrats could most easily defeat. As the general election approached, Wollaston made clear her anger at suggestions that she would be a part-time MP, saying that she would not continue her medical practice if elected. The local branch of Liberal Democrats denied that they were behind rumours that Wollaston intended to continue to practise medicine on a part-time basis. She accepted that the scandal over Anthony Steen's expenses claims had damaged the Conservative Party's chances, and declined his offer of the use of his home to run the Conservative campaign. She pledged to vote in a eurosceptic direction and to support a bypass for Kingskerswell.

== Parliamentary career ==
On election day, Wollaston was elected with a 45.9% share of the vote, and more than doubled the Conservatives' majority. She supported the formation of a Conservative–Liberal Democrat coalition government as being the most appropriate for her constituency in the circumstances after the election, explaining that voters wanted to see politicians working together. Her maiden speech in Parliament, on 2 June 2010, outlined her concerns about alcohol-related crime and alcoholic drink pricing, and also mentioned issues of concern in her constituency, including bovine tuberculosis.

Soon after her election, Wollaston was offered the position of Parliamentary Private Secretary – a junior aide – to one of the Health Ministers, influenced by her professional background. Despite this position being the first rung on the ministerial ladder, Wollaston turned the offer down because it would have required her to avoid speaking out against any Government policy she disagreed with. She later said that she would not have been able to "look [her] constituents in the eye" if she had signed away her ability to speak on the issues she had been elected on.

In her first year in the Commons, Wollaston referred to her experience working with sexual assault victims in warning the Government against its plans to introduce anonymity for people suspected of, or charged with, rape. She argued that it would constitute a "further barrier" for victims to report their crime and that the vast majority of sexual assaults already went unreported. She successfully pressed the Government to take up the way the European Union's Working Time Directive applied to junior doctors' training, saying that it was causing patient care to suffer.

In October 2010, she announced she would not vote to repeal the Hunting Act 2004 because "the overwhelming majority" in her constituency were opposed to hunting. She broke the Conservative whip in November 2010 to support an amendment setting a threshold of 40% turnout for the result of the referendum on voting systems to be valid, and later that month supported a Labour amendment to allow more policyholders to claim compensation over the collapse in Equitable Life dividends.

In March 2013, Wollaston was reselected by her local Conservative Association to fight the 2015 general election as the Conservative candidate. On polling day she was re-elected with 53% of the vote, more than tripling her majority to 18,285 (38.8%).

When campaigning for re-election at the 2017 general election, Wollaston promised her constituents, at a hustings, that she would "accept the result" of the 2016 EU referendum, noting that 54% of her constituents had voted to leave. She went on to state that "one of the things that annoys people is telling them that they didn't know what they were voting for", rejecting the idea of holding a second referendum. She was returned with a reduced majority of 13,477, despite gaining 2,031 more votes. She was appointed chair of the Liaison Committee after the election.

On 20 February 2019, Wollaston resigned from the Conservative Party, along with two other MPs from her party, joining The Independent Group, later styled Change UK, a party advocating for a second referendum. Prior to her defection, 50 local Conservatives signed a petition calling for a no-confidence vote in Wollaston over her position on Brexit, though one of the petition organisers admitted that he had only recently joined the party in order to seek her deselection. In March 2019, it emerged she had sponsored a Ten Minute Rule bill in November 2011 which would have required MPs who switch parties to face an automatic by-election. Wollaston herself switched parties on 20 February 2019, but did not call a by-election. Chair of Totnes and South Devon Labour Party Lynn Alderson said Wollaston "made her views clear". Wollaston acknowledged the likely calls for her to face a by-election but refused such a proposal, stating "neither this nor a general election would answer the fundamental question that is dividing us". In June 2019, she left Change UK to sit as an independent MP.

Wollaston was the sponsor of the Stalking Protection Act 2019.

On 14 August 2019, Wollaston joined the Liberal Democrats campaigning under the slogan "Stop Brexit". She sought re-election as Liberal Democrat candidate for Totnes, but finished second to the Conservative party candidate Anthony Mangnall, losing by a margin of 12,724 votes.

== Political positions ==
=== Health ===
In March 2011, Wollaston warned David Cameron that the government's NHS reforms would result in the NHS going "belly up". She warned that the reorganisation would result in confusion with doctors being overwhelmed. She said there was a risk that Monitor, the new regulator would be filled with "competition economists" who would change the NHS beyond recognition and there was no point "liberating" the NHS from political control only to shackle it to an unelected economic regulator. However, her opposition to the NHS reforms calmed after the party leadership changed certain clauses at her suggestions and she eventually voted in favour of passage of the Health and Social Care Bill.

During her campaign for selection as Conservative candidate in Totnes, Wollaston pledged to tackle the issue of alcohol misuse, having seen the impact of it during her medical career. In Westminster, she pushed for an introduction of minimum unit pricing for alcohol, arguing that a 50p minimum unit price would save almost 3,000 lives a year and save the NHS over £6bn over ten years while costing a moderate drinker only £12 extra per year. When plans to introduce minimum pricing were shelved by the Government in 2013, Wollaston strongly criticised David Cameron and Department for Health Ministers, saying that the change in policy was due to lobbying by Conservative Party strategist Lynton Crosby, whose firm had strong ties to the alcohol industry. Following her comments, she was named MP of the Month by Total Politics for her tough stance.

Having been on the draft Bill Committee for the Care and Support Bill, Wollaston was selected to sit on the Public Bill Committee for the Care Bill in early 2014. There she introduced a number of amendments, including one which would have made terminally ill patients exempt from social care charges.

Wollaston was elected as a member of the Health Select Committee upon entering Parliament, and became chair of the Committee in June 2014 after Stephen Dorrell retired. She defeated fellow GP Phillip Lee, Caroline Spelman, Charlotte Leslie, and David Tredinnick to the role. She was re-elected to this position after the 2015 general election.

In 2015, an undercover Daily Telegraph investigation showed that in some cases, locum agencies Medicare and Team24, owned by Capita, were charging some hospitals higher fees than others and giving false company details. The agencies were charging up to 49% of the fee. Wollaston said the Government should publish details of agency charges as transparency would "drive changes to behaviour".

Wollaston was reckoned by the Health Service Journal to be the 20th-most influential person (and second-most influential woman) in the English NHS in 2015.

=== Social issues ===
Before entering the House of Commons, Wollaston stated that she was "strongly pro-choice", and would not support lowering the abortion limit, as such a measure would affect those who are in the greatest need. In 2011, she voted against backbench amendments to the Health and Social Care Bill which would have prevented abortion providers from offering counselling services.

Wollaston voted in favour of allowing same-sex marriage in 2013, writing that "people who are gay should be allowed to celebrate their love and commitment in a context that society understands". She branded opponents of the change "bigots".

Wollaston rebelled against the Government to vote against setting up a Royal Charter to regulate the press, claiming that many of the activities which had led to the proposal were already illegal and were being exploited to justify censoring the free press. Later, she was the joint winner of The Spectator magazine's Parliamentarian of the Year award for her stance.

In September 2013, she entered the debate about niqābs, saying that some women found them offensive and urging the Government to ban them in schools on the grounds of gender equality.

Wollaston was the only Conservative politician to vote for a pause in the roll-out of Universal Credit on 18 October 2017. The vote was non-binding on the government.

=== Political reform ===
Coming from a non-political background, Wollaston has consistently spoken out in favour of reforming the political system to make it more open and accessible. Citing her own experience in the medical profession, she has called for job-sharing in the Commons, claiming that this would make it easier for women and those with families to stand for Parliament, while helping to improve the experience of MPs.

In 2013, she was a signatory to a campaign for women to be able to inherit noble titles, instead of these being restricted to the male line.

She has often spoken out against political patronage in Westminster and the role of the payroll vote in silencing dissent amongst MPs. She has suggested that vacancies for Parliamentary Private Secretary roles should put out for application and interview to find the most qualified candidate, rather than the candidate most in favour with the government.

Following her selection through the open primary process, she urged the leaders of all parties to expand their use, particularly in safe seats. She said that the cost could be significantly lower than that of the Totnes primary by combining local and European elections with primary elections. In 2013, she suggested that the idea of expanding primaries had been 'shelved' because it was felt that they produce 'awkward' independently-minded MPs.

=== Foreign and European policy ===
In August 2013, Wollaston rebelled and voted against military intervention in Syria. She said such a move could escalate into a wider conflict with hundreds of thousands of victims. She cited strong opposition to intervention by her constituents as a key factor in deciding to vote against.

On the European Union, Wollaston originally supported loosening the relationship between Britain and Brussels and said that she would reluctantly vote to leave the EU if reform could not be achieved. Writing for ConservativeHome in 2013, she expressed support for EU membership because of access to the single market, but questioned whether it was worth the extra bureaucracy for business, loss of sovereignty, and the deficit in democracy. In the House of Commons, she voted in a Eurosceptic manner in several key divisions, voting for a referendum on Britain's EU membership and voting to reduce the EU budget.

Wollaston initially supported the Vote Leave campaign during the 2016 referendum on European Union membership, stating in an article in The Guardian following David Cameron's renegotiation of membership terms in February 2016 that "the prime minister has returned with a threadbare deal that has highlighted our powerlessness to effect institutional change" and that "the balance of our national interest now lies outside the EU". However, she announced on 8 June 2016 that she would change sides to campaign for Britain to remain in the EU, claiming that Vote Leave's assertion that exiting the union would make available £350m a week for health spending "simply isn't true" and represented "post-truth politics". She also suggested that leaving the EU would harm the UK's economy, leading to a "Brexit penalty". Michael Deacon of The Daily Telegraph wrote her decision to switch sides had sparked a conspiracy theory among many Leave campaigners that she was a "government plant", while fellow Conservative MP and Eurosceptic Nadine Dorries said that Wollaston's change of opinion was "deliberately staged and political".

In December 2017, Wollaston voted along with fellow Conservative Dominic Grieve and nine other Conservative MPs against the government, and in favour of guaranteeing Parliament a "meaningful vote" on any deal Theresa May agrees with Brussels over Brexit. She supported the People's Vote campaign for a public vote on the final Brexit deal between the UK and the European Union. Strongly opposing a no-deal Brexit, she said in December 2018: "If it becomes the main objective of government policy to deliver no deal and no transition, then the consequences of that would be so horrific for the people I represent then I couldn't stay a member of the Conservative party." She co-founded the group Right to Vote in early 2019.

== Personal life ==
Wollaston lives in South Devon with her husband Adrian James, a psychiatrist and President of the Royal College of Psychiatrists. They met while studying medicine at Guy's Hospital. They have two daughters and one son. She is a keen cyclist – often on a tandem – and took part in the 2014 RideLondon 100-mile bike race with her husband.

In 2021, after leaving Parliament, Wollaston was appointed chair of NHS Devon and to the board of Torbay and South Devon NHS Foundation Trust as a non-executive director. She resigned as chair of NHS Devon in June 2024 as a protest against planned cuts.

Parliament of the United Kingdom
Preceded by Anthony Steen	Member of Parliament for Totnes; 2010–2019	Succeeded by Anthony Mangnall
