= 2011 Torbay Council election =

2011 UK local government election

Map of results of 2011 election

Elections to Torbay Council took place on Thursday 5 May 2011. All 36 seats on the council were up for election. The previous election also produced a majority for the Conservative Party.

Torbay Council Election, 2011
Party	Seats	Gains	Losses	Net gain/loss	Seats %	Votes %	Votes	+/−
Conservative	22	2	3	– 1	61.1%	41.8%	36 262	– 3.8%
Liberal Democrats	9	1	2	– 1	25.0%	28.7%	24 875	– 3.7%
Labour	1	1	0	+ 1	2.8%	9.4%	8 176	+ 6.3%
Green	0	0	0	–	0	7.3%	6 311	+ 7.3%
Voice 4 Torbay	0	0	0	–	0	1.9%	1 674	+ 1.9%
UKIP	1	1	0	+ 1	2.8%	1.8%	1 598	– 7.4%
English Radical	0	0	0	–	0	*	145	*
Liberty	0	0	0	–	0	*	73	*
Independent	3	1	1	0	8.3%	8.8%	7 654	+ 1.0%

== Ward results ==
Berry Head-with-Furzeham
Party	Candidate	Votes	%	±%
Independent	Jackie Stockman	1 755	20.0%	+ 20.0%
Independent	Mike Morey	1 740	19.8%	+ 5.8%
Independent	Vic Ellery	1 698	19.3%	+ 6.0%
Conservative	Richard Haddock	948	10.8%	– 1.1%
Conservative	Peter McNamara	778	8.8%	– 1.3%
Conservative	Jane Moulder	611	6.9%	– 2.7%
Labour	Lynne Armstrong	398	4.5%	+ 3.6%
Green	John Fallon	309	3.5%	+ 3.5%
Liberal Democrats	Michael Byfield	227	2.6%	– 4.1%
Liberal Democrats	Philip McCallion	175	2.0%	– 1.9%
Liberal Democrats	Eileen Fox	154	1.8%	– 1.6%
Majority				
Turnout			44.02%	
Independent gain from Conservative		Swing		
Independent hold		Swing		
Independent hold		Swing		

Blatchcombe
Party	Candidate	Votes	%	±%
Conservative	Jeanette Richards	1 029	16.6%	+ 0.5%
Conservative	John Thomas	990	16.0%	+ 2.0%
Conservative	David Thomas	959	15.5%	+ 1.2%
Labour	Douglas Litt	612	9.9%	+ 3.6%
Liberal Democrats	John Turner	604	9.7%	– 0.6%
Independent	Chris Robson	548	8.8%	+ 8.8%
Green	Tracey White	494	8.0%	+ 8.0%
Liberal Democrats	Robert Jack	490	7.9%	– 2.0%
Liberal Democrats	Gillian Fazan	469	7.6%	– 1.3%
Majority				
Turnout			33.74%	
Conservative hold		Swing		
Conservative hold		Swing		
Conservative hold		Swing		

Churston Ferrers-with-Galmpton
Party	Candidate	Votes	%	±%
Conservative	Derek Mills	1 448	27.6%	– 2.0%
Conservative	Ken Pritchard	1 348	25.7%	– 2.0%
Voice 4 Torbay	Roger Richards	565	10.8%	+ 10.8%
Liberal Democrats	Dave Browne	472	9.0%	– 6.7%
Independent	Paul Clifford	464	8.8%	+ 8.8%
Labour	Bill Ingham	389	7.4%	+ 7.4%
Liberal Democrats	Lesley Stonier	299	5.7%	– 8.3%
Green	David Benson	259	4.9%	+ 4.9%
Majority				
Turnout			54.02%	
Conservative hold		Swing		
Conservative hold		Swing		

Clifton-with-Maidenway
Party	Candidate	Votes	%	±%
Liberal Democrats	Ian Doggett	859	20.8%	– 3.5%
Liberal Democrats	Ruth Pentney	799	19.3%	– 3.6%
Conservative	Natalie Walsh	740	17.9%	– 0.3%
Conservative	Andy Westwood	621	15.0%	– 1.9%
Labour	David Pedrick-Friend	421	10.2%	+ 10.2%
Labour	Edward Harris	419	10.1%	+ 10.1%
Green	Maureen Bennett	280	6.8%	+ 6.8%
Majority				
Turnout			41.47%	
Liberal Democrats hold		Swing		
Liberal Democrats hold		Swing		

Cockington-with-Chelston
Party	Candidate	Votes	%	±%
Conservative	Gordon Oliver	1 563	17.6%	+ 2.8%
Conservative	Nicole Amil	1 276	14.3%	– 0.3%
Conservative	Michael Hytche	1 257	14.1%	+ 0.2%
Liberal Democrats	Gill Hayman	1 157	13.0%	– 0.3%
Liberal Democrats	Jean Cope	1 011	11.4%	– 0.6%
Liberal Democrats	Mark Pountney	1 007	11.3%	– 0.1%
Labour Co-op	Trevor Fine	641	7.2%	+ 4.9%
Green	Thomas Cooper	524	5.9%	+ 5.9%
Independent	Mark Dent	460	5.2%	– 0.9%
Majority				
Turnout			33.82%	
Conservative hold		Swing		
Conservative hold		Swing		
Conservative hold		Swing		

Ellacombe
Party	Candidate	Votes	%	±%
UKIP	Julien Parrott	540	16.7%	+ 2.0%
Liberal Democrats	Cindy Stocks	522	16.1%	– 0.2%
Conservative	Anne Brooks	435	13.5%	– 0.5%
Conservative	Vince Williams	370	11.4%	– 1.4%
Liberal Democrats	David Poolman	315	9.7%	– 1.7%
UKIP	Jen Walsh	294	9.1%	+ 1.5%
Labour	Patrick Canavan	269	8.3%	+ 1.0%
Labour	Paul Raybould	218	6.7%	+ 6.7%
Green	Virginia Allum	149	4.6%	+ 4.6%
Green	Jim Fox	122	3.8%	+ 3.8%
Majority				
Turnout			33.82%	
UKIP gain from Independent		Swing		
Liberal Democrats hold		Swing		

Goodrington-with-Roselands
Party	Candidate	Votes	%	±%
Conservative	Jane Barnby	942	20.9%	no change
Conservative	Alan Tyerman	820	18.2%	– 1.7%
Liberal Democrats	Christine Carter	721	16.0%	– 5.8%
Liberal Democrats	Sue Biles	719	16.0%	– 4.9%
UKIP	Gary Booth	446	9.9%	+ 0.9%
Labour	Rosalind Royle	338	7.5%	+ 7.5%
UKIP	Janet Hunt	318	7.1%	– 0.4%
Green	Jana Soroka	197	4.4%	+ 4.4%
Majority				
Turnout			33.82%	
Conservative hold		Swing		
Conservative gain from Liberal Democrats		Swing		

Preston
Party	Candidate	Votes	%	±%
Conservative	Dave Butt	1 819	20.2%	+ 2.8%
Conservative	Chris Lewis	1 638	18.2%	+ 2.6%
Conservative	Christine Scouler	1 575	17.5%	+ 2.0%
Liberal Democrats	Linda Turner	900	10.0%	+ 4.1%
Liberal Democrats	Maggi Dunbar	772	8.6%	+ 2.8%
Liberal Democrats	Beverley Brennan	757	8.4%	+ 3.6%
Labour	Stephen Turner	599	6.7%	+ 4.0%
Green	Mark Sangan	499	5.6%	+ 5.6%
Green	Hannah Dumont	425	4.7%	+ 4.7%
Majority				
Turnout			45.46%	
Conservative hold		Swing		
Conservative hold		Swing		
Conservative hold		Swing		

Roundham-with-Hyde
Party	Candidate	Votes	%	±%
Conservative	John Brooksbank	624	17.0%	– 11.1%
Liberal Democrats	Bobbie Davies	588	16.0%	– 3.7%
Conservative	Graham Scouler	543	14.8%	– 11.3%
Green	Sam Moss	491	13.4%	+ 13.4%
Liberal Democrats	Andrew Dunbar	479	13.0%	– 4.6%
Green	Paula Hermes	375	10.2%	+ 10.2%
Labour	Irene Reade	354	9.6%	+ 1.3%
English Radical	Rick Heyse	145	3.9%	+ 3.9%
Liberty	Simon Slade	73	2.0%	+ 2.0%
Majority				
Turnout			38.15%	
Conservative hold		Swing		
Liberal Democrats gain from Conservative		Swing		

St Marychurch
Party	Candidate	Votes	%	±%
Liberal Democrats	Alan Faulkner	1 473	16.5%	+ 1.6%
Conservative	Pete Addis	1 436	16.1%	+ 0.4%
Conservative	Ray Hill	1 165	13.0%	– 1.8%
Conservative	Rachel Ives	1 118	12.5%	– 2.2%
Liberal Democrats	Alan Griffey	1 036	11.6%	– 2.1%
Liberal Democrats	Hamish Renton	819	9.2%	– 3.6%
Voice 4 Torbay	Fiona McPhail	602	6.7%	+ 6.7%
Labour	John Mellor	539	6.0%	+ 6.0%
Green	Steven Luscombe	378	4.2%	+ 4.2%
Green	Sean Collinson	377	4.2%	+ 4.2%
Majority				
Turnout			41.32%	
Liberal Democrats hold		Swing		
Conservative hold		Swing		
Conservative hold		Swing		

St. Mary's-with-Summercombe
Party	Candidate	Votes	%	±%
Conservative	Matthew James	644	17.4%	– 9.1%
Liberal Democrats	Andrew Baldrey	570	15.4%	– 4.9%
Conservative	Terry Manning	556	15.0%	– 11.8%
Independent	Martyn Hodge	482	13.0%	+ 13.0%
Labour Co-op	Rosemary Clark	396	10.7%	+ 10.7%
Labour Co-op	Philip Gregory	367	9.9%	+ 9.9%
Liberal Democrats	Hayley Darby	367	9.9%	– 7.6%
Independent	Nick Henderson	351	9.5%	+ 9.5%
Green	Andy Wilson	184	5.0%	+ 5.0%
Independent	Gordon Boote	156	4.2%	+ 4.2%
Majority				
Turnout			41.64%	
Conservative hold		Swing		
Liberal Democrats hold		Swing		

Shiphay-with-The Willows
Party	Candidate	Votes	%	±%
Conservative	Mark Kingscote	1 163	24.5%	+ 1.7%
Conservative	Alison Hernandez	1 073	22.5%	+ 3.2%
Liberal Democrats	Colin Charlwood	989	20.8%	– 0.3%
Liberal Democrats	Elizabeth Brosnan	806	17.0%	– 1.5%
Labour	Leonora Critchlow	535	11.3%	+ 5.5%
Green	Hazel Robertson	189	4.0%	+ 4.0%
Majority				
Turnout			39.05%	
Conservative hold		Swing		
Conservative gain from Liberal Democrats		Swing		

Tormohun
Party	Candidate	Votes	%	±%
Liberal Democrats	Jenny Faulkner	1 055	17.0%	+ 4.2%
Conservative	Robert Excell	947	15.2%	+ 3.1%
Labour	Darren Cowell	825	13.3%	+ 9.8%
Conservative	Sylvia Faryna	768	12.3%	– 0.3%
Liberal Democrats	Tracey Samways	588	9.4%	– 1.2%
Liberal Democrats	Barrie Wood	564	9.1%	– 0.3%
Conservative	Christopher Clark	524	8.4%	– 3.0%
Voice 4 Torbay	Julie Brandon	507	8.1%	+ 8.1%
Green	Martin Fox	445	7.2%	+ 7.2%
Majority				
Turnout			33.31%	
Liberal Democrats hold		Swing		
Conservative hold		Swing		
Labour gain from Conservative		Swing		

Watcombe
Party	Candidate	Votes	%	±%
Liberal Democrats	Steve Darling	1 122	28.8%	– 1.2%
Liberal Democrats	Roger Stringer	1 025	26.3%	– 1.4%
Conservative	Bruce Cowling	574	14.8%	– 6.6%
Conservative	Jackie Perrins	502	12.9%	– 8.0%
Labour	Jermaine Atiya-Alla	457	11.7%	+ 11.7%
Green	Virginia Compton	211	5.4%	+ 5.4%
Majority				
Turnout			41.36%	
Liberal Democrats hold		Swing		
Liberal Democrats hold		Swing		

Wellswood
Party	Candidate	Votes	%	±%
Conservative	Neil Bent	1 798	33.8%	– 6.8%
Conservative	Beryl McPhail	1 760	33.1%	– 7.1%
Liberal Democrats	Alastair Peart	519	9.8%	– 0.2%
Liberal Democrats	Samuel Rooney	446	8.4%	– 0.9%
Green	Joanne McQuillan	403	7.6%	+ 7.6%
Labour	Sandra Berry	397	7.5%	+ 7.5%
Majority				
Turnout			45.62%	
Conservative hold		Swing		
Conservative hold		Swing		

== See also ==
- 2011 Torbay mayoral election
