= Nicholas Bye =

British politician (born 1960)

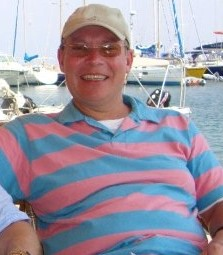

Mayor of Torbay
- In office 24 October 2005 – 8 May 2011
- Preceded by: New office
- Succeeded by: Gordon Oliver

Personal details
- Born: May 1960 (age 66) Paignton, Torbay
- Party: Conservative
- Website: www.torbay.gov.uk

Nicholas David Bye, commonly known as Nick Bye, is a Conservative local politician in England.

== Biography ==
Bye was born in Paignton, Devon and graduated from Oxford University. He was Liberal candidate for Torbay in the 1987 election.

Bye served on Torbay Council for five years and served a term as civic mayor in 2003–04. In October 2005, he became the first directly elected mayor of Torbay. He beat Liberal Democrat Nicholas Pannell in the second round of counting with a total of 7,096 votes to Pannell's 5,197. After the election, Bye noted that "it is quite clear from canvassing that a lot of people did not want an elected mayor."

Bye was the Conservative Party's third directly elected mayor, after Chris Morgan and Linda Arkley in North Tyneside and the first directly elected mayor in the South West. In 2008 fellow Conservative Boris Johnson was elected as the first Conservative mayor of London.

Bye was one of three contenders for the Totnes Conservative candidacy, after the announcement by Anthony Steen that he will not stand in the next election. He placed third in the Totnes primary, and was defeated by Sarah Wollaston.

Bye was the subject of a complaint to Torbay Council's standards committee in August 2010, over the proposed development of a large housing estate on land currently being occupied by Churston Golf Club. This complaint relates to his interests in Eric Lloyd & Co Estate Agents, the only estate agency business with an office in Churston. In 2006 Bye registered the fact that he had a financial interest in the company, and council documents have also shown he is entitled to a profit related bonus from the company.

On 12 November 2010, Bye confirmed that he would be seeking to stand as Mayor of Torbay for a further 4 years however he was deselected by the Conservative Party in favour of former independent candidate, Gordon Oliver, and stood for re-election as an independent. He failed to secure re-election in May 2011, losing to his Conservative opponent Gordon Oliver.

By 2014 Bye had rejoined the Conservative Party; he stood as Conservative candidate for the Wellswood ward of Torbay Council in the 2015 local elections.

Preceded by New Creation	Mayor of Torbay; 2005–2011	Succeeded by Gordon Oliver
