= Justine Greening =

British politician (born 1969)

The Right Honourable Justine Greening
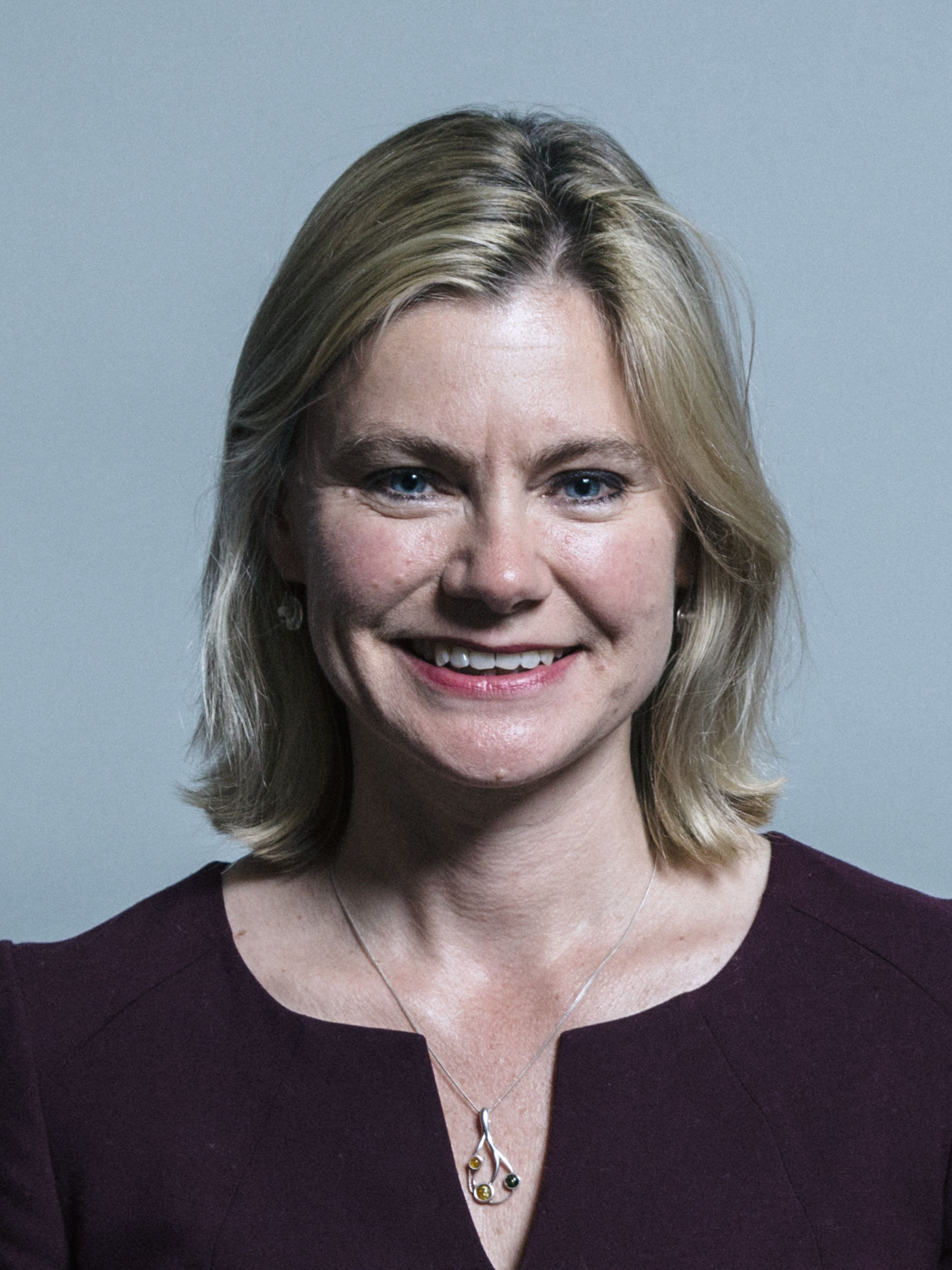
- Official portrait, 2017

Secretary of State for Education
- In office 14 July 2016 – 8 January 2018
- Prime Minister: Theresa May
- Preceded by: Nicky Morgan
- Succeeded by: Damian Hinds

Minister for Women and Equalities
- In office 14 July 2016 – 8 January 2018
- Prime Minister: Theresa May
- Preceded by: Nicky Morgan
- Succeeded by: Amber Rudd

Secretary of State for International Development
- In office 4 September 2012 – 13 July 2016
- Prime Minister: David Cameron
- Preceded by: Andrew Mitchell
- Succeeded by: Priti Patel

Secretary of State for Transport
- In office 14 October 2011 – 4 September 2012
- Prime Minister: David Cameron
- Preceded by: Philip Hammond
- Succeeded by: Patrick McLoughlin

Economic Secretary to the Treasury
- In office 13 May 2010 – 14 October 2011
- Prime Minister: David Cameron
- Preceded by: Ian Pearson
- Succeeded by: Chloe Smith

Shadow Minister for London
- In office 19 January 2009 – 13 May 2010
- Leader: David Cameron
- Preceded by: Bob Neill
- Succeeded by: Tessa Jowell

Member of Parliament for Putney
- In office 5 May 2005 – 6 November 2019
- Preceded by: Tony Colman
- Succeeded by: Fleur Anderson

Personal details
- Born: 30 April 1969 (age 57) Rotherham, West Riding of Yorkshire, England
- Party: Conservative
- Education: University of Southampton (BSc); London Business School (MBA)
- Website: Official website

Justine Greening (born 30 April 1969) is an English former politician who was the Secretary of State for Education from 2016 to 2018. Prior to that, she was Economic Secretary to the Treasury from 2010 to 2011, Secretary of State for Transport from 2011 to 2012 and Secretary of State for International Development from 2012 to 2016. A member of the Conservative Party, she was Member of Parliament (MP) for Putney from 2005 to 2019.

Greening resigned as Education Secretary and Minister for Women and Equalities in the January 2018 Cabinet reshuffle. On 3 September 2019, she announced she would not be standing as an MP at the next general election. Later the same day, she was one of 21 Conservative MPs who had the whip withdrawn after voting against Boris Johnson's government over Brexit. She sat as an independent MP until Parliament was dissolved for the December 2019 general election.

== Early life ==
Greening was born in Rotherham, where she attended Oakwood Comprehensive School. She studied Business Economics and Accounting at the University of Southampton, graduating with a first class honours degree in 1990. She obtained an Executive MBA from the London Business School in 2000.

Before entering Parliament, Greening trained and qualified as an accountant, working as an accountant/finance manager for, amongst others, PricewaterhouseCoopers, GlaxoSmithKline and Centrica. She contested the constituency of Ealing, Acton and Shepherd's Bush in 2001, finishing second with a reduced share of the vote for the Conservatives.

== Parliamentary career ==
=== Early career ===
Greening gained the seat of Putney from Labour in the 2005 general election on 5 May 2005. Greening won 15,497 votes (42.4% of the vote) giving her a majority of 1,766 (4.8%). She unseated Tony Colman, who had held the seat for Labour since defeating David Mellor in 1997.

As the first Conservative elected on the evening of the election, her victory was the first real sign that the Conservative Party was to reduce the Labour Government's majority and begin to recover from the landslide defeats of the 1997 and 2001 general elections. Michael Howard, who had visited Putney to give a speech on his first day as Conservative Leader, returned there on the morning after the election to congratulate Putney Conservatives and give the speech in which he announced his intention to step down. Greening was the youngest female Conservative MP in the House of Commons until Chloe Smith was elected to Parliament on 12 October 2009.

Greening was appointed a vice-chair (with responsibility for youth) of the Conservative Party on 15 December 2005, having earlier that year been appointed a member of the Work and Pensions Committee. In July 2007, following a shadow ministerial reshuffle, she was promoted to be a Junior Shadow Minister for The Treasury.

In January 2009, following a further shadow ministerial reshuffle, Greening was promoted to Shadow Minister for London, within the Communities and Local Government Team with responsibility for Local Government Finance. Within this brief, she focused on transport and local community benefits.

In March 2010, she was put in charge of co-ordinating the Conservative campaign for the 2010 general election in London. She held the post of Economic Secretary to the Treasury from 13 May 2010 to 14 October 2011, where she helped deliver the emergency budget in 2010.

=== Transport Secretary ===
In October 2011, Greening was appointed Secretary of State for Transport and was sworn of the Privy Council.

Whilst Greening represented the London constituency of Putney she had always campaigned against a third runway at Heathrow Airport. In the run up to the 2012 Cabinet reshuffle, Greening said it would be difficult to serve in a Cabinet which was in favour of a third runway.

In her role as Secretary of State for Transport, Greening oversaw the award of new rail franchises, including the award of the Intercity West Coast franchise to First Group in 2012. In October 2012, Greening announced that the government was cancelling the franchise competition for the InterCity West Coast franchise after discovering significant technical flaws in the way the franchise process was conducted, reversing the decision to award it to FirstGroup. Subsequently, Sir Philip Rutnam, then Permanent Secretary at the Department for Transport, issued an apology to Greening stating the problem "clearly the responsibility of officials and not ministers". A report by the Transport Select Committee found fault with Greening and revealed that the cost to the taxpayer of the flawed franchise process was at least £40 million.

=== International Development Secretary ===
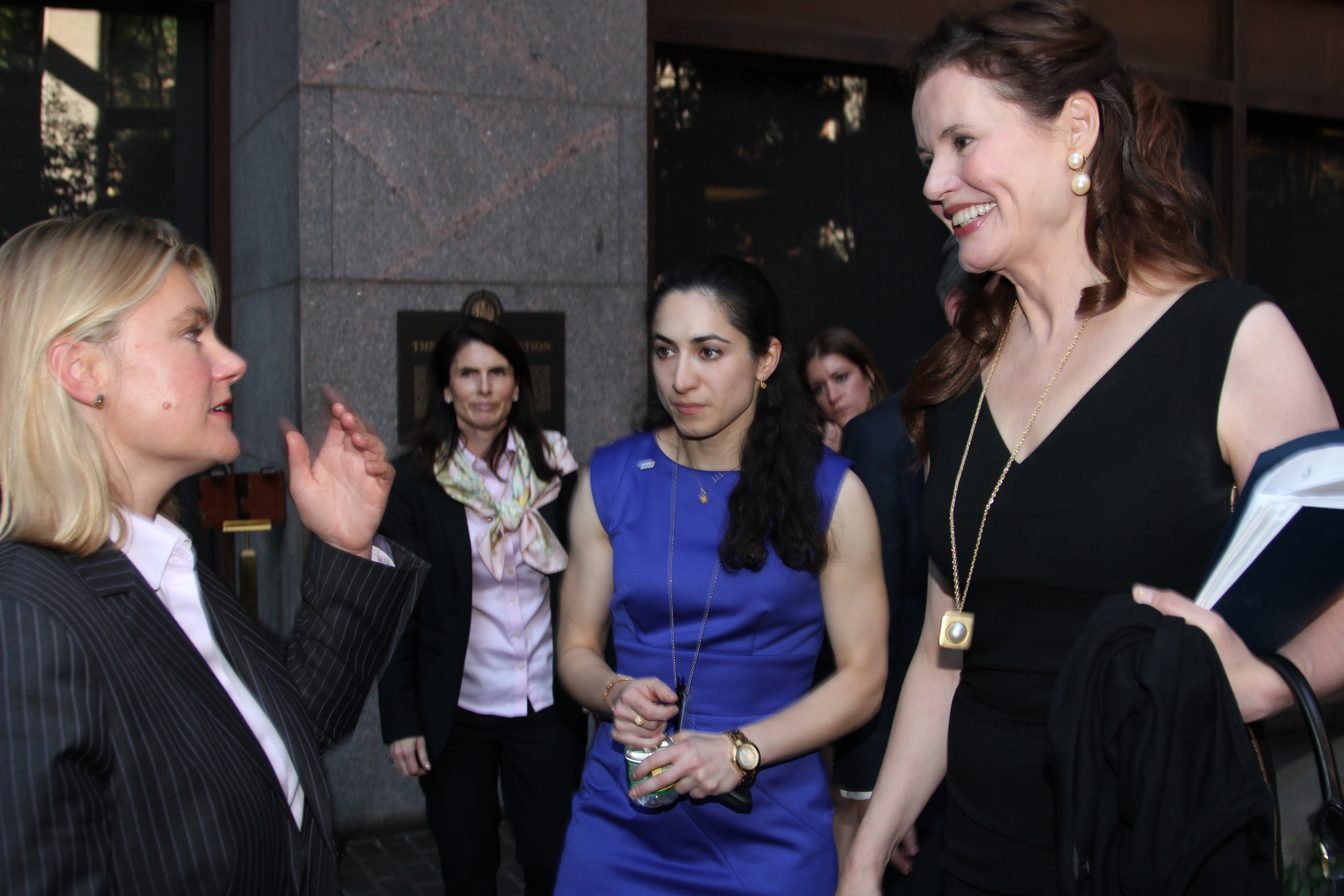
Secretary of State Greening meets actress Geena Davis at the Millennium Development Goals Countdown event at the Ford Foundation Building (24 September 2013)

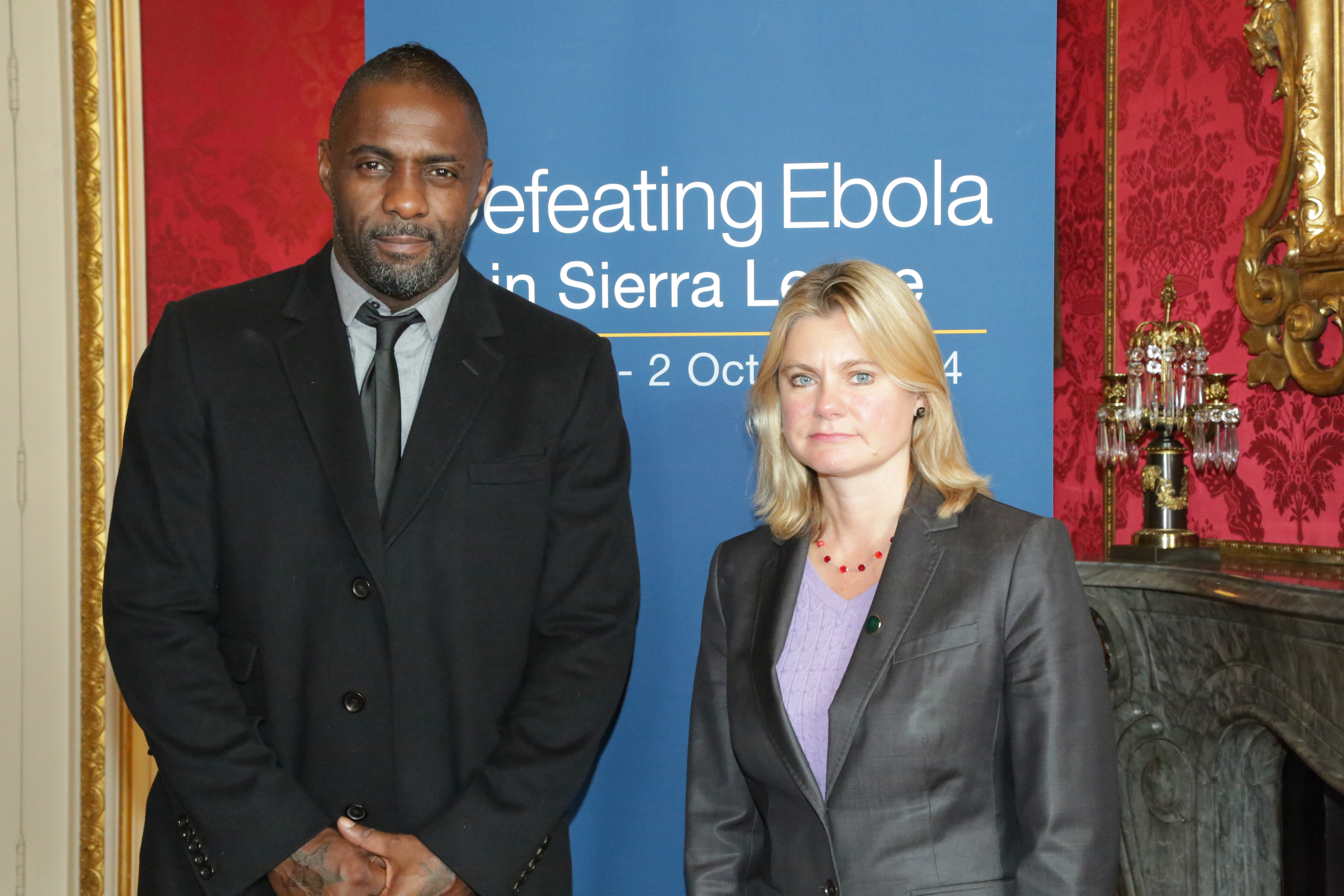
Greening and actor Idris Elba at a Defeating Ebola virus conference (2014)

On 4 September 2012, Greening was replaced by Patrick McLoughlin at the Department for Transport and became Secretary of State for International Development. The move was strongly criticised by the Mayor of London Boris Johnson who believed it was linked to her opposition to a third runway at Heathrow. As Secretary of State for International Development, Greening became a member of the National Security Council.

Whilst she was in the role of International Development Secretary, the UK became the first G8 country to meet the commitment to spend 0.7% of its gross national income on international development, meeting the UN official development assistance target subsequently legislating for this. Greening led the UK response to international natural disasters such as Typhoon Haiyan in the Philippines in 2013 and the Nepal earthquake in 2015.

In 2014, Greening held the first-ever Girl Summit in London, which saw leaders and young people from all over the world come together to work to help combat female genital mutilation and early and forced marriage.

Greening led the UK response to the Syria crisis including the UK work in Lebanon and Jordan to support local economies to provide work for refugees as well as local people. Greening pioneered the "No Lost Generation" initiative with then UNHCR boss Antonio Guterres and UNICEF to enable Syrian refugee children to still continue their education.

Greening led the international response to the Ebola outbreak in Sierra Leone in 2014–2015, committing a £230 million aid package including support for 700 treatment beds and funding for children orphaned by the crisis. Greening stated that children would not be "left behind once Ebola was defeated." Operation Gritrock was the first-ever UK military campaign led by DFID, and was also supported by NHS personnel.

In 2015, Greening announced a new economic empowerment programme for women at the Global Goals Summit and campaigned successfully for Sustainable Development Goal 5: Gender Equality to be included amongst the UN Sustainable Development goals during international negotiations.

Following an initiative by Greening, Ban Ki Moon, then UN Secretary General, announced in 2016 the creation of the UN's first high-level panel on women's economic empowerment. Greening joined other founding panel members including Jim Kim, the then president of the World Bank, and Christine Lagarde, the then head of the International Monetary Fund, to make recommendations on how to support the realisation of women's economic potential around the world.

During the refugee crisis, Greening oversaw £1 billion of aid spending to support Syrian refugees with water, food, shelter and medical care. Greening further pressured UK businesses and other countries to "put their hands in their pockets" to help before warning the European migrant crisis could last 20 years if nothing was done. Greening argued during negotiations for the Paris Climate Change Agreement that climate change would continue to be a root cause of refugee migration and launched an insurance scheme to help developing nations deal with natural disasters caused by climate change.

=== Education Secretary ===
Greening was appointed Secretary of State for Education and Minister for Women and Equalities by Theresa May on 14 July 2016, replacing Nicky Morgan in both roles. During her time in these posts, she announced the creation of social mobility 'opportunity areas', and the approval of additional free schools. She has also spoken in favour of creating new grammar schools and retaining university tuition fees.

In the June 2017 general election, after which the Conservatives formed a minority government, she held her Putney constituency with a reduced majority and a loss in vote share of 9.7%. She remained Education Secretary and Minister for Women and Equalities after the election until her resignation from government on 8 January 2018, during a cabinet reshuffle: it was reported that she had rejected the post of Secretary of State for Work and Pensions, interpreted variously as the offer of a "sideways move" or a demotion.

Whilst Education Secretary, Greening developed targeted Opportunity Areas across England which saw targeted funding to link schools and employers in areas with weak social mobility. In December 2017, Greening launched the Department for Education's Social Mobility Action Plan to improve social mobility through education which included four ambitions on further education, skills, early years and attainment gaps. Other departments in Whitehall have followed the example and have also created their own social mobility action plans.

=== Return to the backbenches ===
In 2018, she established the Social Mobility Pledge, a new scheme aimed at broadening social mobility and opportunity in Britain. Later that year, she became the first senior Conservative to come out in favour of a new EU referendum, arguing that Parliament was unable to make a decision on Brexit and therefore it had to be put back to the people. In October 2018, in an interview on Good Morning Britain she was asked if she would be interested in launching a leadership bid. Greening said: "Well, things need to change, don't they, and people need to have some hope for the future that Britain can be a country that runs differently and more fairly." Questioned again on whether she would stand for the Conservative leadership if there were a vacancy, Greening said: "I might be prepared to, but I'm more interested in the Conservative party actually showing what it can do for this country."

In early 2019, she co-founded the group Right to Vote alongside Dominic Grieve and Phillip Lee calling for a new referendum. Following the formation of The Independent Group, Greening suggested that she could resign the Conservative whip if there was a 'no deal' Brexit. In April 2019, Greening indicated again that she would run for the Tory leadership if a 'centrist' did not run. She also unveiled possible policies such as scrapping tuition fees in favour of a graduate tax and increasing the number of Opportunity Areas.

=== Sitting as an independent ===
On 3 September 2019, Greening joined 20 other rebel Conservative MPs to vote against the Conservative government of Boris Johnson. The rebel MPs voted with the Opposition against a Conservative motion which subsequently failed. Effectively, they helped block Johnson's "no deal" Brexit plan from proceeding on 31 October. Subsequently, all 21 were advised that they had lost the Conservative whip, expelling them as Conservative MPs, requiring them to sit as independents. If they decided to run for re-election in a future election, the Party would block their selection as Conservative candidates. However, Greening said she was not planning to stand for re-election.

== After parliament ==
Since leaving parliament, Greening has campaigned for social mobility and equality of opportunity. She hosts the Fit For Purpose podcast, which aims to "explore how business is working to level up Britain".

In 2020, following the outbreak of the COVID-19 virus and ensuing United Kingdom lockdown, she campaigned for businesses to provide extra support to their employees, customers and communities during the crisis.

Since December 2020, Greening partnered with Northampton University to support national COVID-19 recovery in a campaign.

She was granted an honorary doctorate from the University of Southampton (where she had previously graduated in 1990) on 19 July 2023, something which she described as "incredibly humbling". Since 1 June 2024, she has served as Chancellor of the University of Southampton, jointly with Kamlesh Patel, Baron Patel of Bradford.

== Personal life ==
In June 2016, Greening revealed on Twitter that she was in a "happy same-sex relationship". Referring to the EU membership referendum, she added: "I campaigned for Stronger In but sometimes you're better off out!"

Greening was previously in a relationship with Mark Clarke, a former Conservative parliamentary candidate for Tooting who was expelled from the party for his involvement in a bullying scandal of young members.

Parliament of the United Kingdom
Preceded by Tony Colman	Member of Parliament for Putney; 2005–2019	Succeeded by Fleur Anderson
Political offices
Preceded by Ian Pearson	Economic Secretary to the Treasury; 2010–2011	Succeeded by Chloe Smith
Preceded by Philip Hammond	Secretary of State for Transport; 2011–2012	Succeeded by Patrick McLoughlin
Preceded by Andrew Mitchell	Secretary of State for International Development; 2012–2016	Succeeded by Priti Patel
Preceded by Nicky Morgan	Secretary of State for Education; 2016–2018	Succeeded by Damian Hinds
Preceded by Nicky Morgan	Minister for Women and Equalities; 2016–2018	Succeeded by Amber Rudd
