= 2009 Gosport Conservative primary =

Conservative Party (UK) parliamentary primary in Gosport, 2009
4 December 2009
- Turnout: 17.8%
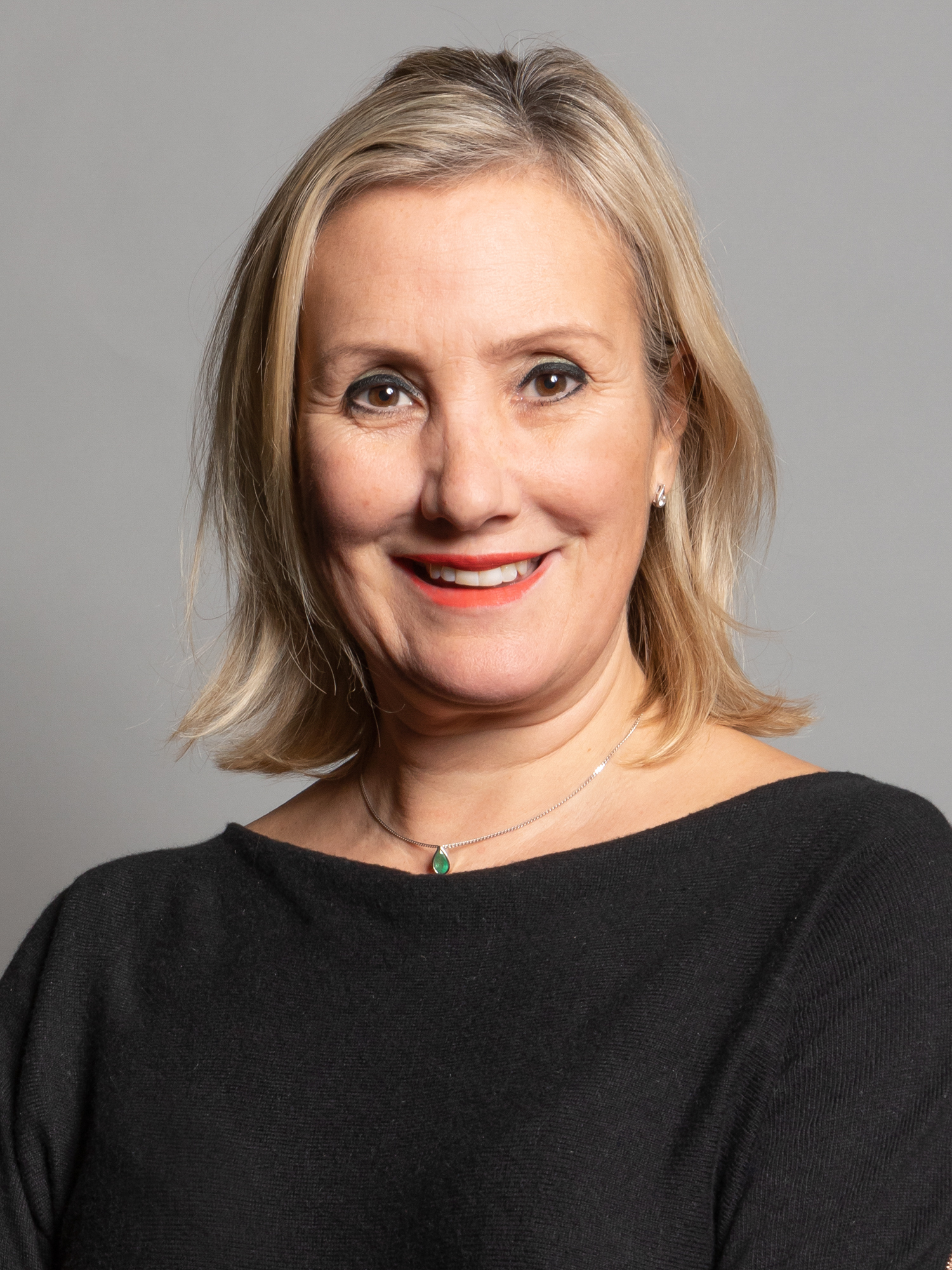

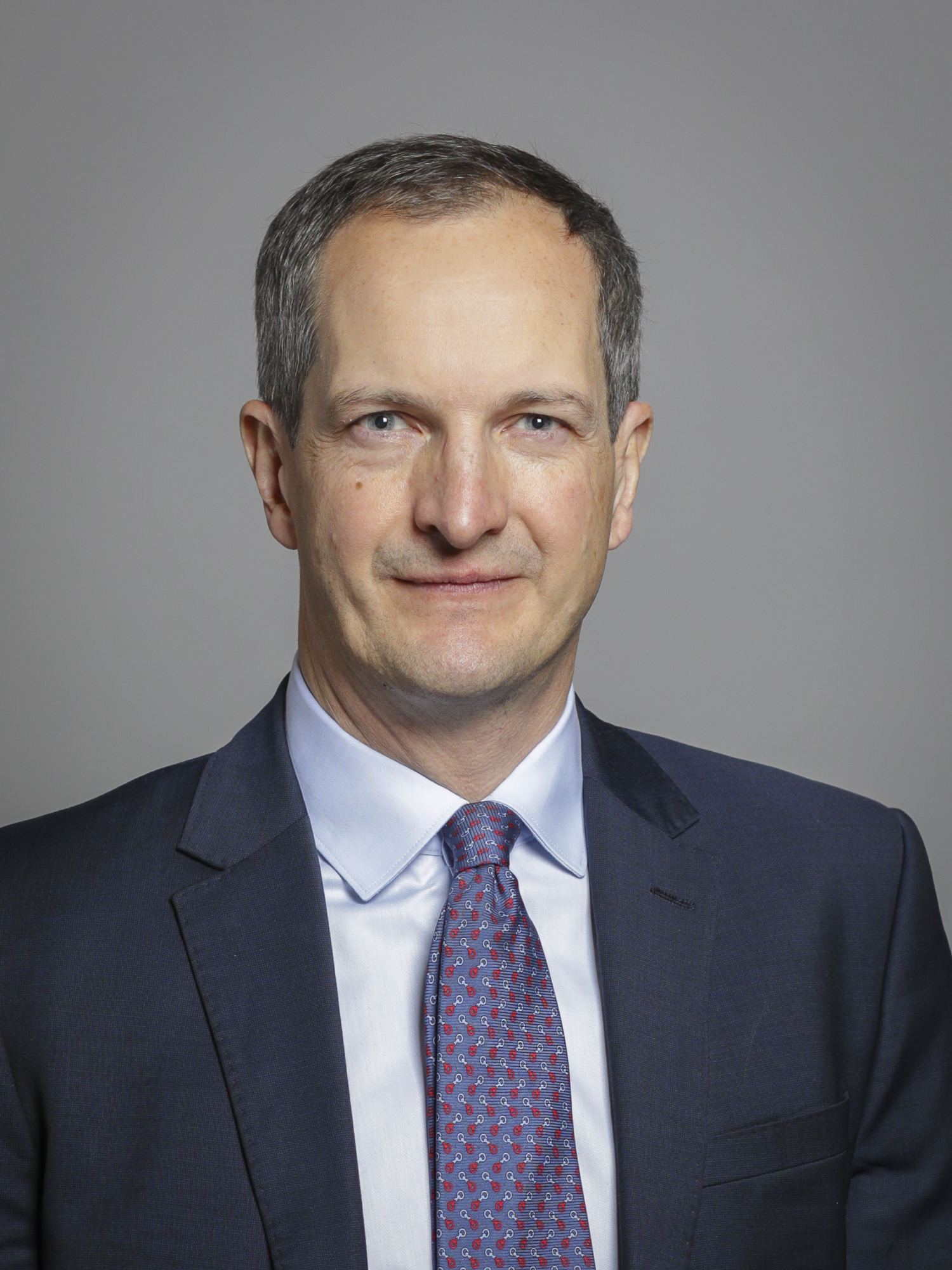

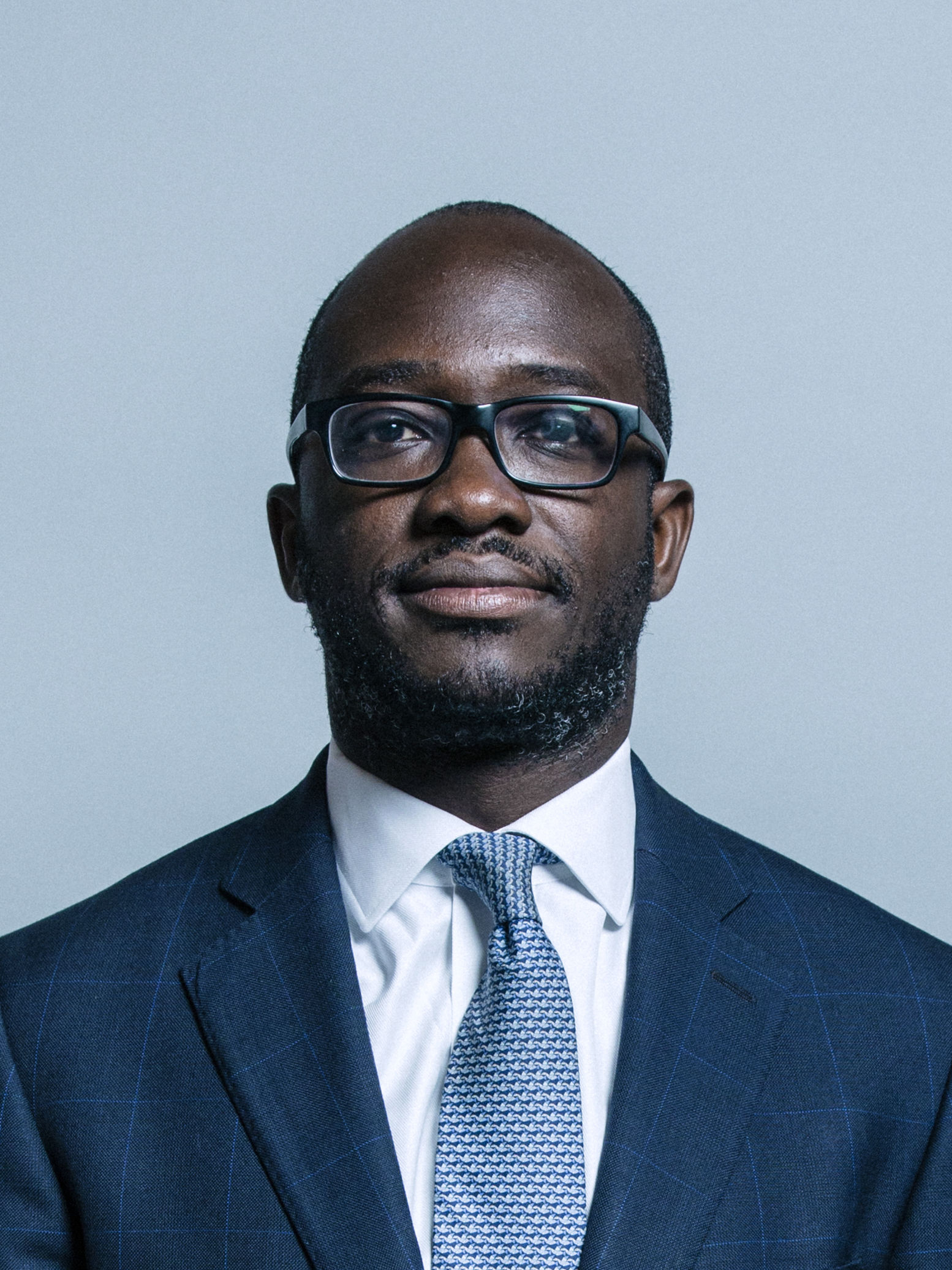

Candidate	Caroline Dinenage	James Bethell, 5th Baron Bethell
Popular vote	4,892	2,965
Percentage	38.6%	23.4%
Candidate	Sam Gyimah	Julia Manning
Popular vote	2,867	1,935
Percentage	22.6%	15.3%
Elected Prospective Parliamentary Candidate
Caroline Dinenage

The Gosport Conservative Party parliamentary primary of 2009 was the 1st open primary election used to select the Conservative prospective parliamentary candidate for the constituency of Gosport. The election was held on Friday 4 December 2009 under the first-past-the-post system. The incumbent MP, Sir Peter Viggers, had announced his intention to decline re-election following the parliamentary expenses scandal, in which he gained huge media attention for attempting to claim £1,645 for a duck house.

== Background ==
On 21 May 2009, The Daily Telegraph reported that Sir Peter Viggers, MP for Gosport, had claimed over £30,000 in gardening expenses over three years. Details of a "pond feature" worth £1,645, identified as a "floating duck island", were also published. On hearing that the national newspaper would be running the story on the front page the next day, Viggers announced that he would resign at the next election. The floating duck house claim later became a symbol of the Westminster expenses scandal.

The Chairman of the Gosport Constituency Conservative Association was accused of sexism after he told Channel 4 News that he would happily appoint a female candidate if she were attractive. This followed remarks by a local councillor, saying that his application to succeed Viggers had been rejected by Conservative Campaign Headquarters, perhaps because he was "a man and too old".

Following the successfully high turnout at the Totnes primary, David Cameron announced that further open primary elections would be used to select parliamentary candidates. On 28 October, it was revealed that Gosport would hold an open primary in December, following a public hustings in the final fortnight of the campaign. Party Chairman Eric Pickles confirmed the news and noted that, "it is vital to empower local people and allow them to have the final say".

== Campaign ==
The procedure for the primary process determined that the number of candidates would be shortlisted to six, by the Gosport Constituency Conservative Association. A second shortlist would then be drawn up, eliminating two candidates. The four remaining candidates would appear on the ballot. Ballot papers were sent to every registered voter in the Gosport constituency via a postal vote, regardless of their political affiliation on 12 November. On 20 November, a public hustings involving the four candidates took place. The deadline for the return of ballot papers was established to be three weeks after their initial launch on 4 December - the result was declared on the same day.

== Candidates ==
First Shortlist

The six candidates in the first shortlist were:

- James Bethell, 5th Baron Bethell, Director of Westbourne Communications and former managing director of the Ministry of Sound. Joined the House of Lords in July 2018, after successfully contesting a Conservative Party hereditary peers' by-election.
- Maria Caulfield, party activist in Sussex and a councillor on the Brighton & Hove City Council. Later became MP for Lewes in the 2015 general election.
- Caroline Dinenage, unsuccessful Conservative candidate for Portsmouth South in the 2005 general election and local business owner
- Sam Gyimah, a businessman and Chairman of the Bow Group (2006-7). Became MP for East Surrey at the 2010 general election.
- Julia Manning, a former NHS optometrist and founder of the independent think tank, 2020Health
- John Moss, later stood as the Conservative candidate for City and East in the 2012 London Assembly election

Second Shortlist

The four candidates in the final shortlist were:

- James Bethell, 5th Baron Bethell
- Caroline Dinenage
- Sam Gyimah
- Julia Manning

=== Criticism ===
The first shortlist was met with criticism due to the lack of candidates from the borough of Gosport. Conservative Party members in Gosport were reported in the local media to be angered that CCHQ had used the primary election to select A-List candidates to a safe Conservative seat.

== Results ==
Ballot: 4 December 2009
Candidate	Votes	%
Caroline Dinenage	4,892	38.6
James Bethell, 5th Baron Bethell	2,965	23.4
Sam Gyimah	2,867	22.6
Julia Manning	1,935	15.3
Majority	1,927	15.2
Turnout	12,659	
Dinenage elected Gosport PPC

== See also ==
- Conservative Party (UK) parliamentary primaries
- 2009 Totnes Conservative primary
