= Proposed referendum on the Brexit withdrawal agreement =

Proposal for a second referendum

A referendum on the Brexit withdrawal agreement, also referred to as a "second referendum", (Note: Following the 2016 United Kingdom European Union membership referendum. A few commentators, such as New Statesman political editor Stephen Bush, prefer third referendum, counting both the 2016 referendum and the 1975 United Kingdom European Communities membership referendum.) a "rerun", a "people's vote", (Note: People's Vote is the name of a pressure group. For that reason, some broadcasters avoid the term or prefer "so-called people's vote") or a "confirmatory public vote", was proposed by a number of politicians and pressure groups as a way to break the deadlock during the 2017–19 Parliament surrounding the meaningful vote on the Brexit deal.

Following the invocation of Article 50 to begin Brexit negotiations, most proposals for a new referendum suggested a choice between accepting the negotiated withdrawal agreement and remaining in the EU, sometimes with the additional option to leave the EU with no deal. In the case of a three-option referendum, voting systems such as supplementary vote, and Borda count were suggested to allow people to state their second preferences.

Reasons that were cited as justification include campaign finance violations by Vote Leave and Leave.EU, the alleged use of data illicitly harvested by Cambridge Analytica, allegations of Russian interference through fake social media accounts and allegedly through funding, arguments that the "Leave" camp promoted misinformation, a gradual shift in public opinion, fuelled in part by demographic changes such as adolescents who were too young to take part in the first referendum reaching voting age, and that the eventually-arranged terms of Brexit were unknown at the time of the original vote.

The most widely discussed proposal was a referendum between "Remain" and "Accept the deal", which was promoted by the People's Vote pressure group. This was the official position of the Liberal Democrats, the Green Party of England and Wales, Plaid Cymru and the Scottish National Party. The Labour Party also adopted this position in September 2019. The Conservative Party and Brexit Party were opposed to any referendum.

On 12 December 2019, the Conservative Party, led by Boris Johnson, won an 80-seat overall majority in the 2019 general election, albeit on 43.6% of the vote (whereas 51.5% had voted for parties supporting a new referendum). This ended the possibility of any referendum on the withdrawal agreement being held before ratification by the UK Parliament or before the UK left the European Union. Subsequently, the UK Parliament passed the European Union (Withdrawal Agreement) Act 2020 which received royal assent on 23 January 2020, and the United Kingdom formally left the European Union at 23:00 GMT on 31 January 2020.

== History ==
A few weeks after the referendum, an e-petition, originally set up beforehand on 25 May 2016 by a member of the Leave-supporting English Democrats, demanding it be re-run in the event that a supermajority was not reached, became the most popular petition on the site, receiving 4,150,262 signatures. On 5 September 2016, the petition received a non-binding debate by Members of Parliament (MPs) in the Grand Committee Room of Parliament's Westminster Hall but its proposal was rejected.

The Liberal Democrats and Green Party went into the 2017 general election campaigning in favour of a second referendum, and a minority of pro-EU rebels from Labour and the Conservatives also spoke in favour of it. These allied in April 2018 into the People's Vote campaign group. After several cabinet ministers resigned in protest at the Chequers statement setting out the Government's position in the Brexit negotiations, Conservative MP Justine Greening proposed a three-way referendum, using the supplementary vote system in an attempt to avoid vote splitting.

The leader of the Trades Union Congress, which is closely allied with Labour, said at its 2018 conference that it would declare in favour of a second referendum if the government failed to get "the deal that working people need". On 25 September 2018, delegates at the Labour Party Conference voted in favour of a motion that if Labour did not support Theresa May's deal, and if subsequent attempts to call another general election failed, the party should explore all options, including a second referendum. In early December 2018, the Financial Times reported that Leave groups had also started preparing for another referendum.

The Labour leadership did not make any commitments to a referendum in January 2019. On 18 February 2019, seven pro-EU MPs resigned from the Labour Party to form The Independent Group (TIG). Over the following days, another Labour MP and three Conservative Party MPs joined them. All eleven supported a referendum.

The following week, the Labour Party announced that it would put forward its own second referendum amendment if its attempts to safeguard workers' rights, Single market access and Customs Union membership failed.

In September 2019, the Labour Party adopted the position of holding a public vote on whether to leave or remain regardless of which party negotiated the withdrawal agreement.

=== Parliamentary votes ===
The proposal for a referendum on the withdrawal agreement was first put to Parliament on 14 March 2019 in an amendment (tabled by Sarah Wollaston) to the motion to request the first extension to the Article 50 deadline, where it was rejected by 85–334, with the Labour Party (and all but 43 of its MPs) abstaining.

On 27 March and 1 April 2019, a series of indicative votes was held, both times including a referendum on the withdrawal agreement among the proposals. All proposals failed, with those for such a referendum receiving in the first round 268 Ayes, 295 Noes and 71 abstentions (a majority of 27) and in the second round 280 Ayes, 292 Noes and 62 abstentions (a majority of 12). In both rounds, it was the proposal second-closest to receiving an affirmative majority.

== Opinion polling ==
With "Neither" responses

Normalised

Opinion polling (since the 2016 referendum) on whether the UK should leave or remain in the EU
Leave
Remain

Polling companies asked questions based on a hypothetical future referendum after the 2016 referendum. For most of 2016 and 2017, public opinion was consistently against another referendum and in the event one was called, polling suggested the Leave option would win again. As Brexit negotiations continued however, the Leave lead consistently slipped and public support for another referendum grew. As of February 2019, no poll in the Britain Elects poll-tracker had shown a lead for Leave since April 2018, and political scientist John Curtice has noted "a modest but discernible softening of the Leave vote".

The results of polls asking whether a further referendum should be held varied depending on how the question was phrased: in general a "second referendum" was less popular than a "public vote" or similar descriptor.

Following the scale of Conservative rebellion to the Chequers statement became clear, some polls asked a three-way preference between "Remain", "Deal" and "No deal". The results in this case depended to a great degree on the choice of voting system – a first-past-the-post system for example might see a large Remain win due to vote splitting between the two Leave options.

=== Support for a future referendum ===
A poll conducted in December 2022 by Savanta, 65% of voters were in favor of holding a second referendum, while 24% were opposed (11% do not know).

The following table shows the support for a public vote on the withdrawal agreement or a second EU referendum according to polls conducted Between the 2016 referendum and 2020.

Date(s) conducted	Support	Oppose	Neither	Lead	Sample	Conducted by	Polling type	Notes
17–18 Oct 2019	47%	44%	9%	3%	1,025	Survation	Online	
17–18 Oct 2019	43%	41%	16%	2%	1,025	Survation	Online	(Note: Question asked about a second EU referendum, not necessarily on the final deal.)
17 Oct 2019	EU and UK negotiators agree a new withdrawal agreement.							
2–14 Oct 2019	41%	45%	14%	4%	26,000	ComRes		Three-option referendum
29–30 Sep 2019	47%	29%	24%	18%	1,620	YouGov	Online	As opposed to a parliamentary vote, if a deal is negotiated.
29–30 Sep 2019	52%	23%	25%	29%	1,620	YouGov	Online	As opposed to a parliamentary vote, if no deal is negotiated.
5–9 Sep 2019	53%	29%	18%	24%	1,144	Kantar	Online	
5–7 Sep 2019	43%	42%	15%	1%	2,049	Deltapoll	Online	
3–4 Sep 2019	46%	41%	13%	5%	1,533	YouGov	Online	
29–31 Aug 2019	41%	47%	12%	6%	2,028	Deltapoll	Online	
15–19 Aug 2019	52%	29%	19%	23%	1,133	Kantar	Online	
25–27 Jul 2019	44%	44%	12%	0%	2,001	Deltapoll	Online	
24 Jul 2019	Boris Johnson replaces Theresa May as Prime Minister							
2–5 Jul 2019	41%	39%	19%	2%	1,532	BMG Research	Online	
23 May 2019	2019 European Parliament election in the United Kingdom							
9–13 May 2019	47%	28%	25%	19%	1,152	Kantar	Online	
4–8 Apr 2019	51%	32%	17%	19%	1,172	Kantar	Online	
2–5 Apr 2019	52%	24%	24%	28%	1,500	BMG Research	Online	
3 Apr 2019	35%	39%	25%	4%	1,068	Sky Data	Online	(Note: Referendum on whether to accept the negotiated terms or remain in the EU.)
1 Apr 2019	The House of Commons rejects a motion proposing a referendum on the withdrawal agreement in the second round of indicative votes.							
28–30 Mar 2019	40%	38%	22%	2%	1,010	Deltapoll	Online	
29 Mar 2019	The House of Commons votes to reject the Government's proposed withdrawal agreement for the third time.							
28–29 Mar 2019	42%	40%	19%	2%	2,008	Opinium	Online	On whether MPs should have voted for the relevant motion during the indicative votes
27 Mar 2019	The House of Commons rejects a motion proposing a referendum on the withdrawal agreement in the first round of indicative votes.							
27 Mar 2019	40%	35%	25%	4%	1,005	Sky Data	Online	On whether MPs should vote for the relevant motion during the indicative votes
19 Mar 2019	48%	36%	15%	12%	2,084	YouGov	Online	
14–15 Mar 2019	48%	36%	15%	12%	1,823	YouGov	Online	
14–15 Mar 2019	50%	36%	14%	14%	1,823	YouGov	Online	On whether to leave with no deal or remain in the EU, if the UK looks set to leave without a deal
14–15 Mar 2019	38%	52%	10%	14%	1,756	YouGov	Online	
14 Mar 2019	The House of Commons rejects an amendment which called for a referendum on the withdrawal agreement.							
12 Mar 2019	The House of Commons votes to reject the Government's proposed withdrawal agreement for the second time.							
4–5 Mar 2019	44%	56%	—	11%	2,042	ComRes	Online	No "Neither" option. Unusual wording.
21–23 Feb 2019	43%	45%	11%	2%	1,027	Deltapoll	Online	
18 Feb 2019	47%	35%	18%	12%	1,021	Survation	Online	
8–11 Feb 2019	41%	48%	11%	7%	2,004	Deltapoll	Online	
4–8 Feb 2019	50%	32%	17%	18%	1,503	BMG Research	Online	
18 Jan 2019	39%	48%	14%	9%	1,021	Sky Data	Online	
17 Jan 2019	30%	30%	40%	0%	1,792	Sky Data	Online	Three-option referendum
17 Jan 2019	35%	29%	36%	6%	1,792	Sky Data	Online	
17 Jan 2019	33%	31%	35%	2%	1,792	Sky Data	Online	(Note: Referendum on whether to accept the negotiated terms or leave the EU without a deal.)
17 Jan 2019	37%	30%	33%	7%	1,792	Sky Data	Online	(Note: Referendum on whether to remain in the EU or leave the EU without a deal.)
16–17 Jan 2019	38%	47%	15%	9%	2,031	ComRes	Online	
16 Jan 2019	47%	36%	16%	11%	1,070	YouGov	Online	
15 Jan 2019	The House of Commons votes to reject the Government's proposed withdrawal agreement for the first time.							
14–15 Jan 2019	35%	48%	17%	12%	2,010	ComRes	Online	
8–11 Jan 2019	46%	28%	26%	18%	1,514	BMG Research	Online	
7–8 Jan 2019	36%	49%	15%	13%	1,754	YouGov	Online	
21 Dec 2018 – 4 Jan 2019	41%	36%	22%	5%	25,537	YouGov	Online	
14–15 Dec 2018	44%	35%	21%	9%	1,660	YouGov	Online	Three-option referendum
14–15 Dec 2018	50%	27%	22%	23%	1,660	YouGov	Online	If Parliament cannot decide how to proceed
13–14 Dec 2018	43%	46%	12%	3%	2,022	Deltapoll	Online	
12–14 Dec 2018	44%	35%	20%	9%	5,043	YouGov	Online	
30 Nov-2 Dec 2018	40%	50%	11%	10%	2,035	ComRes	Online	
9–30 Nov 2018	Ministers including Brexit Secretary Dominic Raab and Work and Pensions Secretary Esther McVey resign in protest to the government's proposed withdrawal agreement (or to plans preceding it).							
28–29 Nov 2018	45%	36%	18%	9%	1,655	YouGov	Online	
23–26 Nov 2018	53%	39%	8%	14%	1,119	Sky Data	Online	Three-option referendum
15-16 Nov 2018	44%	30%	26%	14%	1,256	Populus	Online	
15 Nov 2018	55%	35%	10%	20%	1,488	Sky Data	SMS	Three-option referendum. Not weighted by 2016 vote.
15 Nov 2018	42%	38%	20%	4%	1,070	Survation	Online	
14–15 Nov 2018	48%	34%	17%	14%	1,153	YouGov	Online	
14–15 Nov 2018	47%	53%	—	6%	2,000	ComRes	Online	Only if there is no deal. Not weighted by 2016 vote. No "Neither" option.
14 Nov 2018	The UK Cabinet approves a new draft withdrawal agreement.							
7 Nov 2018	The Scottish Parliament commits to providing unequivocal support for a public vote on the final terms of the Brexit deal.							
24 Oct – 6 Nov 2018	65%	35%	—	30%	8,154	Populus	Online	No "Neither" option
20 Oct – 2 Nov 2018	43%	37%	20%	6%	20,086	Survation	Online	
20 Oct – 2 Nov 2018	38%	39%	23%	1%	20,086	Survation	Online	
20 Oct – 2 Nov 2018	39%	37%	24%	2%	20,086	Survation	Online	(Note: Referendum on whether to accept the negotiated terms or re-open negotiations with a view to getting a better deal.)
28 Sep – 1 Oct 2018	53%	40%	7%	13%	1,443	Sky Data	Online	Three-option referendum
25–26 Sep 2018	34%	50%	16%	16%	1,634	YouGov	Online	
25–26 Sep 2018	37%	48%	15%	11%	1,634	YouGov	Online	
21–22 Sep 2018	39%	43%	17%	4%	1,643	YouGov	Online	
18–19 Sep 2018	40%	43%	17%	3%	2,509	YouGov	Online	
10–11 Sep 2018	50%	39%	10%	11%	1,070	Sky Data	Online	Three-option referendum
4–5 Sep 2018	40%	41%	18%	1%	1,628	YouGov	Online	
31 Jul – 4 Sep 2018	45%	35%	21%	10%	25,641	YouGov	Online	
31 Aug – 1 Sep 2018	40%	43%	17%	3%	1,600	YouGov	Online	
31 Aug – 1 Sep 2018	45%	37%	18%	9%	1,017	Survation	Online	
17–20 Aug 2018	50%	42%	9%	8%	1,330	Sky Data	Online	Three-option referendum
31 Jul – 20 Aug 2018	45%	33%	22%	12%	18,772	YouGov	Online	
6–10 Aug 2018	48%	24%	27%	24%	1,481	BMG Research	Online	
26–31 Jul 2018	43%	41%	17%	2%	4,957	YouGov	Online	
25–26 Jul 2018	42%	40%	18%	2%	1,631	YouGov	Online	
24 Jul 2018	The Independent launches its campaign for a second referendum.							
20–23 Jul 2018	50%	40%	10%	9%	1,466	Sky Data	Online	Three-option referendum
16–17 Jul 2018	40%	42%	18%	2%	1,657	YouGov	Online	
16–17 Jul 2018	36%	47%	17%	11%	1,657	YouGov	Online	Three-option referendum
10–11 Jul 2018	37%	41%	23%	4%	1,732	YouGov	Online	
8–9 Jul 2018	Brexit Secretary David Davis and Foreign Secretary Boris Johnson resign.							
6 Jul 2018	The UK Cabinet agrees the Chequers statement, setting out a proposal on the future UK–EU relationship.							
3–5 Jul 2018	44%	27%	29%	17%	1,511	BMG Research	Online	
19–20 Jun 2018	37%	45%	18%	8%	1,663	YouGov	Online	
19–20 Jun 2018	48%	25%	27%	23%	1,022	Survation	Online	
13–14 May 2018	38%	46%	16%	8%	1,634	YouGov	Online	
12 May 2018	The National Union of Students calls for a referendum on the final deal.							
1–4 May 2018	53%	31%	16%	22%	2,005	Opinium		
15 Apr 2018	People's Vote campaign launched.							
10–12 Apr 2018	52%	31%	17%	21%	2,008	Opinium	Online	
9–10 Apr 2018	38%	45%	17%	7%	1,639	YouGov	Online	
6–8 Apr 2018	47%	36%	17%	11%	2,012	ICM	Online	
5–6 Apr 2018	39%	45%	17%	6%	823	YouGov	Online	
26–27 Mar 2018	36%	42%	22%	6%	1,659	YouGov	Online	
16–23 Mar 2018	41%	52%	7%	11%	1,616	Sky Data	Online	
5–6 Mar 2018	36%	43%	20%	7%	1,641	YouGov	Online	
2 Mar 2018	35%	54%	11%	19%	1,096	ComRes	Online	
2 Mar 2018	Theresa May makes Mansion House speech, outlining the UK Government's policy on the future UK–EU relationship.							
16–23 Mar 2018	41%	52%	7%	12%	1,616	Sky Data	Online	
14–16 Feb 2018	34%	54%	11%	20%	1,482	Sky Data	Online	
16–19 Jan 2018	35%	56%	9%	21%	1,096	Sky Data	Online	
10–19 Jan 2018	47%	34%	19%	13%	5,075	ICM	Online	
9–10 Jan 2018	36%	43%	21%	7%	1,714	YouGov	Online	
15 Dec 2017	The European Council decides to proceed to the second phase of the Brexit negotiations.							
10–11 Dec 2017	33%	42%	24%	9%	1,680	YouGov	Online	
30 Nov – 1 Dec 2017	50%	34%	16%	16%	1,003	Survation	Online	
23–24 Oct 2017	32%	46%	22%	14%	1,637	YouGov	Online	
22–24 Sep 2017	34%	46%	21%	12%	1,716	YouGov	Online	
22 Sep 2017	Theresa May makes Florence speech, in an attempt to 'unblock' the Brexit negotiations.							
12–13 Sep 2017	34%	47%	19%	13%	1,660	YouGov	Online	
14–15 Jul 2017	46%	39%	15%	7%	1,024	Survation	Online	
7–11 Jul 2017	41%	48%	12%	7%	2,005	Opinium		
28–30 Jun 2017	46%	47%	6%	1%	1,017	Survation	Telephone	
16–20 Jun 2017	38%	51%	11%	13%	2,005	Opinium		
19 Jun 2017	Brexit negotiations begin.							
16–17 Jun 2017	48%	43%	9%	5%	1,005	Survation	Telephone	
16–17 Jun 2017	38%	57%	4%	19%	1,005	Survation	Telephone	
10 Jun 2017	36%	55%	9%	18%	1,036	Survation	Online	
8 Jun 2017	2017 United Kingdom general election							
28 Apr – 2 May 2017	36%	53%	11%	17%	2,003	Opinium		
27–28 Apr 2017	31%	49%	20%	18%	1,612	YouGov	Online	
21–22 Apr 2017	39%	46%	14%	7%	2,072	Survation	Online	
20–21 Apr 2017	31%	48%	21%	17%	1,590	YouGov	Online	
29 Mar 2017	The United Kingdom invokes Article 50.							
17–21 Mar 2017	38%	52%	10%	14%	2,003	Opinium		
17 Jan 2017	Theresa May makes Lancaster House speech, setting out the UK Government's negotiating priorities.							
15–18 Dec 2016	35%	53%	13%	18%	2,048	ComRes		
13–16 Dec 2016	33%	52%	15%	19%	2,000	Opinium		
2 Oct 2016	Theresa May makes Conservative Party Conference speech, announcing her intention to invoke Article 50 by 31 March 2017.							
13 Jul 2016	Theresa May becomes Prime Minister of the United Kingdom.							
29–30 Jun 2016	32%	60%	7%	28%	1,017	BMG Research	Telephone	
27–28 Jun 2016	31%	58%	11%	27%	1,760	YouGov	Online	
23 Jun 2016	2016 United Kingdom European Union membership referendum							

== Advocates ==
=== Political parties ===
- Liberal Democrats
- Green Party of England and Wales
- Scottish Green Party
- Green Party Northern Ireland
- Peace Party
- Renew Britain
- National Health Action Party
- Radical Party
- Scottish National Party
- Plaid Cymru
- Mebyon Kernow
- Alliance Party of Northern Ireland
- Social Democratic and Labour Party
- Women's Equality Party
- UK European Union Party
- The Independent Group for Change
- Labour Party
- UK EPP
- Left Unity
- Advance Together
- Animal Welfare Party

=== Members of Parliament ===
==== Labour Party ====
Labour Party MPs who advocated a referendum on the proposed withdrawal agreement
- Jeremy Corbyn, Leader of the Opposition (2015–20) (Note: Labour membership suspended: 29 October 2020 – 17 November 2020; whip suspended since 29 October 2020)
- John McDonnell, Shadow Chancellor of the Exchequer (2016–20)
- Keir Starmer, Shadow Brexit Secretary (2016–20)
- Tom Watson, Deputy Leader of the Labour Party (2015–20)
- Rushanara Ali
- Debbie Abrahams
- Tonia Antoniazzi
- Luciana Berger
- Margaret Beckett
- Roberta Blackman-Woods, Shadow Minister for Planning (2018–19)
- Ben Bradshaw
- Chris Bryant, Chair of the Commons Finance Committee (2017–19)
- Karen Buck
- Ruth Cadbury
- Jenny Chapman, Shadow Brexit Minister (2016–20)
- Ann Clwyd
- Neil Coyle
- Mary Creagh, Chair of the Environmental Audit Committee (2016–19)
- Stella Creasy
- Alex Cunningham, Shadow Minister for Housing (2019–20)
- Janet Daby
- Geraint Davies
- Stephen Doughty
- Rosie Duffield
- Maria Eagle
- Louise Ellman
- Peter Kyle
- Mike Gapes
- Kate Green, Chair of the Committee on Privileges and Chair of the Committee on Standards (2018–20)
- Lilian Greenwood, Chair of the Transport Select Committee (2017–20)
- John Grogan
- Margaret Hodge
- Rupa Huq
- Darren Jones
- Graham Jones
- Liz Kendall
- Ged Killen
- Peter Kyle
- David Lammy
- Seema Malhotra
- Kerry McCarthy
- Stephen Morgan, Shadow Minister for Communities (2019–20)
- Bridget Phillipson
- Anna Turley, Chair of the Co-operative Party (2019)
- Matt Western
- Martin Whitfield
- Paul Williams
- Phil Wilson
- Daniel Zeichner

==== Liberal Democrats ====
Liberal Democrat MPs who advocated a referendum on the proposed withdrawal agreement
- Jo Swinson, Leader of the Liberal Democrats (2019)
- Heidi Allen
- Philip Lee
- Chuka Umunna
- Sarah Wollaston

==== Independent ====
Independent MPs who advocated a referendum on the proposed withdrawal agreement
- Guto Bebb
- Ann Coffey
- Chris Leslie
- Gavin Shuker
- Anna Soubry

== See also ==
- Proposed second Scottish independence referendum
