= Mayor of Torbay =

Chief executive of Torbay, England

- Appointer: Direct election
- Term length: Four years
- Formation: 20 October 2005
- First holder: Nicholas Bye
- Final holder: Gordon Oliver
- Abolished: 6 May 2019

The Mayor of Torbay was the directly elected executive mayor of the borough of Torbay in Devon, England. The post was abolished in 2019 after a referendum held in May 2016. The last holder of the post was Gordon Oliver. The position was different from the largely ceremonial annually appointed mayors, who were renamed the "civic mayors" on the introduction of the directly elected mayor. The civic mayor role continues to exist.

== Referendums ==
Mayor of Torbay referendum 14 July 2005
Choice	Votes	%
Elected Mayor	18,074	55.18
Leader and Cabinet System	14,682	44.82
Total	32,756	100.00
Registered voters/turnout		32.1
Source: Torbay Council

Referendum on how Torbay is governed 5 May 2016
Choice	Votes	%
Leader and Cabinet System	15,846	62.49
Elected Mayor	9,511	37.51
Total	25,357	100.00
Valid votes	25,357	99.49
Invalid/blank votes	129	0.51
Total votes	25,486	100.00
Registered voters/turnout	100,853	25.27
Source: Torbay Council

== Elections ==
=== 2005 ===
Torbay Mayoral Election 20 October 2005
Party	Candidate	1st round		2nd round			1st round votesTransfer votes, 2nd round
Party	Candidate	Total	Of round	Transfers	Total	Of round	1st round votesTransfer votes, 2nd round
Conservative	Nicholas Bye	5,283	21.9%	1,813	7,096	57.7%	
Liberal Democrats	Nicholas Pannell	3,811	15.8%	1,386	5,197	42.3%	
Independent	Gordon Oliver	3,516	15.6%				
Independent	Susan Colley	2,871	11.9%				
Independent	Percy Brewis	2,015	8.4%				
Independent	Robert Crawford	1,161	4.8%				
Independent	Marshall Richie	1,152	4.8%				
Independent	Peter Middleton	1,030	4.3%				
Independent	Beverley Brennan	881	3.7%				
Labour	David Pedrick-Friend	767	3.2%				
Independent	James O'Dwyer	647	2.7%				
Independent	Julien Parrott	526	2.2%				
Independent	Beverley Oxley	322	1.3%				
Independent	James Grimble	143	0.6%				
Conservative win							

=== 2011 ===
Mayor of Torbay election 5 May 2011
Party	Candidate	1st round		2nd round			1st round votesTransfer votes, 2nd round
Party	Candidate	Total	Of round	Transfers	Total	Of round	1st round votesTransfer votes, 2nd round
Conservative	Gordon Oliver	10,630	25.7%	2,086	12,716	56.9%	
Independent	Nicholas Bye	7,983	19.3%	1,648	9,631	43.1%	
Liberal Democrats	Dennis Brewer	6,905	16.7%				
Labour Co-op	Patrick Canavan	3,793	9.2%				
Independent	Susan Colley	3,559	8.6%				
Independent	Paul Clifford	2,414	5.8%				
Independent	Martin Brook	2,090	5.1%				
Voice 4 Torbay	Fiona McPhail	2,084	5.0%				
Green	Sam Moss	1,918	4.6%				
Conservative hold							

=== 2015 ===
Mayor of Torbay election 7 May 2015
Party	Candidate	1st round		2nd round			1st round votesTransfer votes, 2nd round
Party	Candidate	Total	Of round	Transfers	Total	Of round	1st round votesTransfer votes, 2nd round
Conservative	Gordon Oliver	15,354	25.1%	3,989	19,343	50.8%	
Liberal Democrats	Dennis Brewer	11,788	19.3%	6,934	18,722	49.2%	
UKIP	Julien Parrott	11,325	18.5%				
Labour	Darren Cowell	8,119	13.3%				
Independent	Susie Colley	7,541	12.3%				
Independent	Martin Brook	5,846	9.5%				
Independent	Pamela Neale	1,249	2.0%				
Conservative hold							

== Replacement ==
The council's political leadership since 2019 has reverted to being a leader of the council chosen by the councillors.
