= Phillip Lee (politician) =

British politician

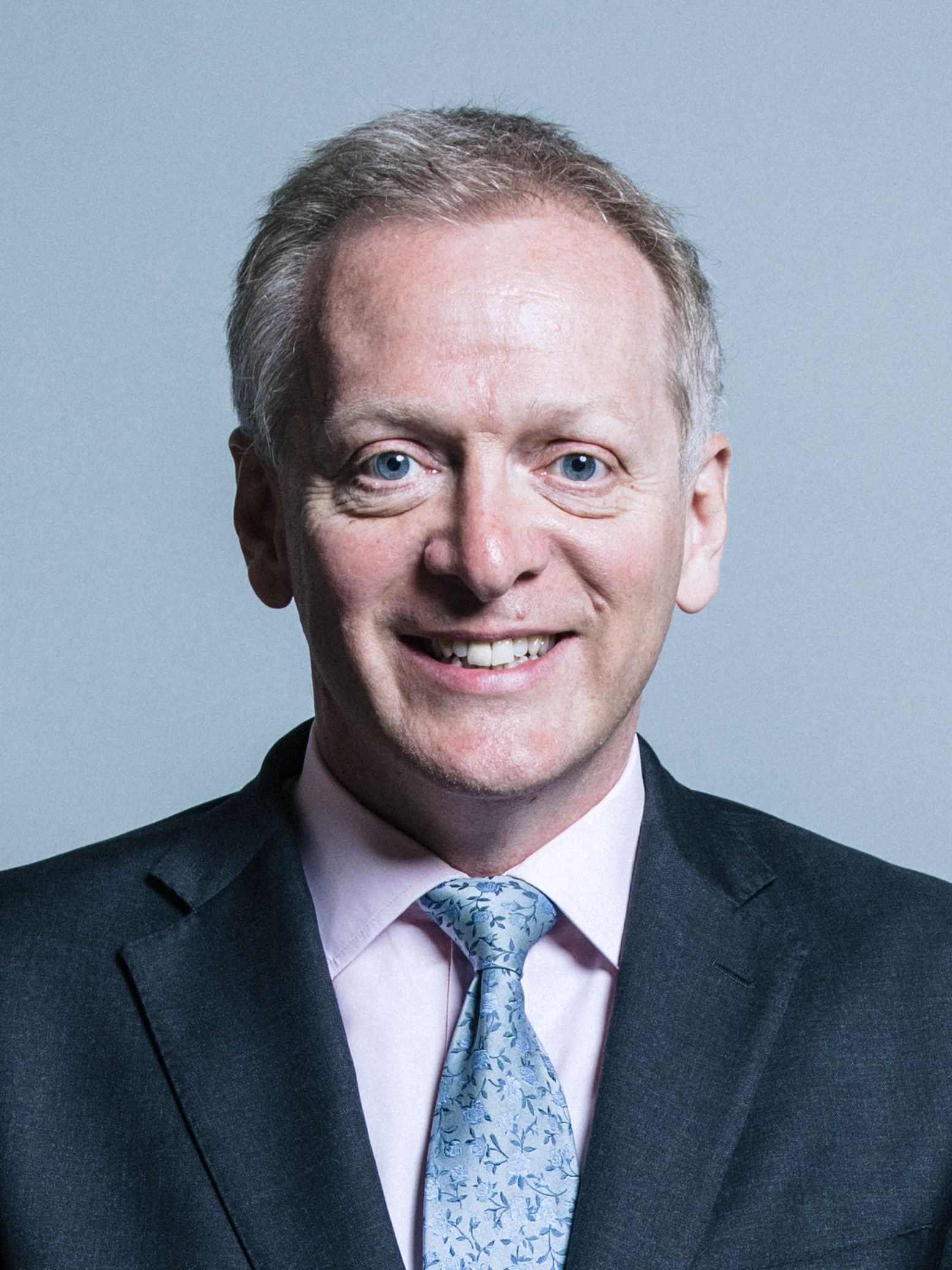
- Official portrait, 2017

Liberal Democrat Spokesperson for Justice
- In office 21 October 2019 – 12 December 2019
- Leader: Jo Swinson
- Preceded by: Christine Jardine
- Succeeded by: Daisy Cooper

Parliamentary Under-Secretary of State for Victims, Youth and Family Justice
- In office 17 July 2016 – 12 June 2018
- Prime Minister: Theresa May
- Preceded by: Dominic Raab
- Succeeded by: Edward Argar

Member of Parliament for Bracknell
- In office 6 May 2010 – 6 November 2019
- Preceded by: Andrew MacKay
- Succeeded by: James Sunderland

Chairman of Right to Vote
- In office 17 January 2019 – 12 September 2019
- Preceded by: Position established
- Succeeded by: Position abolished

Personal details
- Born: Phillip James Lee; 28 September 1970 (age 56) Taplow, Buckinghamshire, England
- Party: Liberal Democrats
- Other political affiliations: Conservative (1992–2019)
- Spouse: Catherine Day
- Education: King's College London; Keble College, Oxford; Imperial College London
- Profession: Physician
- Website: phillip-lee.com

Phillip James Lee (born 28 September 1970) is a British doctor and politician who served as the Member of Parliament (MP) for Bracknell from 2010 until 2019. A former member of the Conservative Party, which he left in 2019 to join the Liberal Democrats. He unsuccessfully stood for the neighbouring Wokingham constituency in the 2019 general election.

Lee was appointed Parliamentary Under-Secretary of State responsible for youth justice, victims, female offenders and offender health at the Ministry of Justice in July 2016. He resigned from the government in June 2018 in response to its handling of Brexit. On 3 September 2019, he resigned from the Conservative Party to join the Liberal Democrats; and between October and December 2019 he served as their Spokesperson for Justice.

== Early life and career ==
Phillip Lee was born and raised in Buckinghamshire, England, and went to his local grammar school, Sir William Borlase's Grammar School in Marlow. Lee studied Human Biology and Biological Anthropology at King's College London and Keble College, Oxford, where his research interests included the psychodynamics of anti-Semitism; the psychology of the child sex offender; the influence of the pre-natal environment on adult disease; and infertility clinic outcomes.

He went on to study medicine at Imperial College London and qualified as a physician in 1999. He has worked in hospitals across the Thames Valley, including Wexham Park Hospital, Stoke Mandeville Hospital, Wycombe Hospital, St Mark's (Maidenhead) and Heatherwood Hospital as well as at St Mary's Hospital, London. Lee qualified as a general practitioner (GP) in 2004 and continues to practise locally part-time.

== Political career ==
=== Conservative Party ===
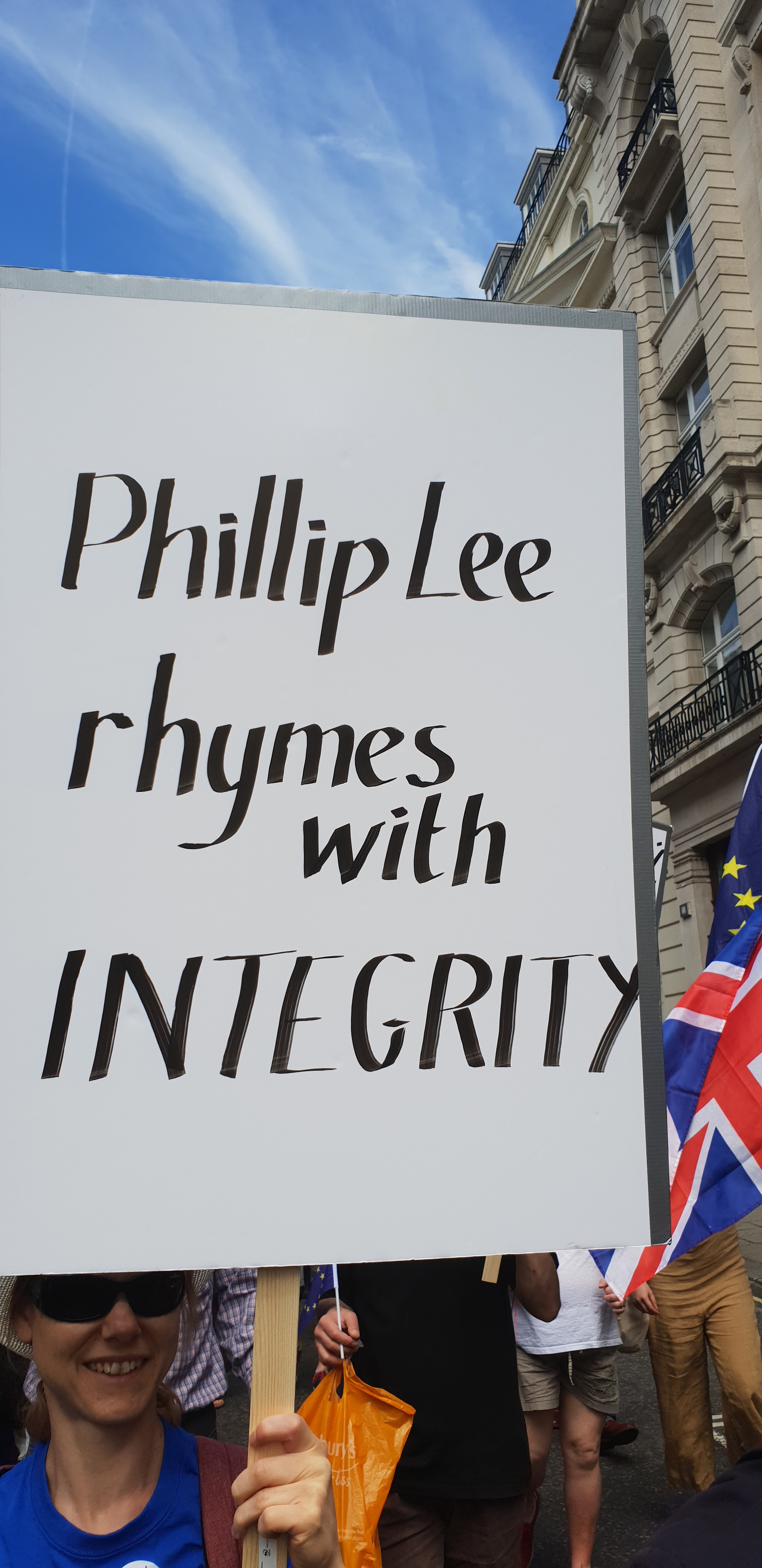
Supporters of Lee's resignation stand at the 2018 People's Vote march.

Lee's political career began in local politics. He joined the Conservatives in Beaconsfield in 1992, becoming a member of its executive board in 1997 and its deputy chairman in 2005. Lee ran for the local council in 2001. In the 2005 general election, he campaigned as the party's candidate for what was the safest Labour seat in Wales of Blaenau Gwent in South Wales. He polled just 816 votes - all other parties had been put by the wayside when there was a prominent and bitter campaign between Labour, who had imposed an all-women shortlist on the constituency, and the Independent candidate Peter Law, who took the seat. After being appointed a priority national candidate on the party's first A-List in 2006, Lee was selected in an open primary in 2009 to be the candidate to fight the local seat of Bracknell in Berkshire at the 2010 general election. The seven-person short-list also included prominent Conservative commentator Iain Dale, and Rory Stewart. At the 2010 general election, Lee retained the seat for his party with a majority of 15,704 votes.

Lee's parliamentary interests include:

Energy
He served as a member of the Energy and Climate Change Select Committee and was at the forefront of questioning UK energy companies' price hikes. Lee has called for energy efficiency to be the primary target of the UK Government's policy and supports increasing energy security with more nuclear power and an interconnector with Norway. He drew attention to the limited potential of free markets in the energy sector and called for cooperative ways of retailing and distributing electricity and gas.
Health
Lee warned in 2011 that the National Health Service as then configured would not meet future demand for healthcare and campaigned for healthcare services in the United Kingdom and funding to be reconfigured. His 2012 publication "The Royal Thames Valley Hospital – a Vision of a Sustainable Healthcare Plan" is a proposal for improving clinical outcomes while building capacity to meet future healthcare demand across the Thames Valley. The then Home Secretary, Theresa May, also a Thames Valley MP, gave the plan her support at a public meeting in January 2013. Lee sparked controversy in 2013 when he suggested that provision of free medicine by the NHS would need to be restricted because Britons are less willing than previous generations to tolerate discomfort, and again in 2014 when he called for migrants with HIV and hepatitis B to be banned from entering the UK. He proposed introducing individual healthcare statements in a Ten Minute Rule Bill in 2012. In 2014, Lee stood for election as Chairman of the Health Select Committee.
At the Social Market Foundation fringe meeting at the 2017 Conservative party conference, he referred to pensions, health and social care as a Ponzi scheme which was about to collapse.
Foreign affairs
Lee served as vice chair of the Conservative Middle East Council from 2010. He argued for a comprehensive approach to foreign policy, pointing out that energy policy should be an important element in foreign and defence policies. In 2012, he warned of rising threats from China's domestic vulnerabilities. He regularly participated in the Konrad-Adenauer-Stiftung's exchange programme with members of the German Bundestag and has called for a closer relationship with Germany. He voted against military action in Syria in 2013 as he believed there needed to be a more thought-through strategy towards Syria and the wider region before the United Kingdom involved itself. In July 2014, he argued for a strong response to the shooting down of Malaysia Airlines Flight 17 on Europe's border and for Britain's role in the world to be redefined saying, "I fear that because of our level of debt and of dependence, and our complete absence of any vision or leadership, we are being less of a country than we should be and most certainly less of a country than the globe desperately needs".
Science, technology and space
Lee was vice chair of the Parliamentary Space Committee. Lee was also a member of the Parliamentary Office of Science and Technology in the 2010–2015 Parliament. He has long campaigned for a British space port and supported Reaction Engines' breakthrough in aerospace technology with its SABRE. His 2011 Adjournment debate on microgravity spurred £60m state investment into the European Space Agency's ELIPS programme. This funding played a significant part in the European Space Agency's decision to grant Timothy Peake a place in space. Lee was a Member of the Administration Committee from July 2010 to December 2012 and sits on the Parliamentary Medical Panel. He has driven improvements to mental health services for parliamentarians. Lee served as Chairman of the All Party Parliamentary Environment Group (2010–2013).

Lee's voting record was loyal. He rarely rebelled against the Conservative whip and did not vote against anything in the Conservative's manifesto. However, he did not support the UK Government's High Speed 2 project which he said is of the past and not of the future, profligate and not a priority for infrastructure investment. Neither did he support the Government's proposals for House of Lords reform or military action in Syria in 2013. Lee abstained over Same-sex marriage legislation, noting that Parliament's role should be limited to legislating for equal civil union while calling on the Church to find a way to recognise same-sex relationships.

In his constituency of Bracknell, Lee campaigned for better services and facilities. He called for improved health service outcomes and in 2012 launched a plan to achieve this which would consolidate acute healthcare in a new, regional centre of excellence and deliver a greater proportion of care in the community – including through the recently opened Bracknell Urgent Care Centre. He lobbied for better transport links into, and across, the region and South West Trains is now increasing passenger rail capacity from Bracknell. Lee supports expanding London Heathrow Airport and has endorsed the Heathrow Hub proposal to extend capacity alongside the extension of Crossrail to Reading. Lee lobbied BT Group to improve the delivery of superfast broadband and coverage across the constituency in 2012 was almost 90%.

Lee was opposed to Brexit prior to the 2016 referendum. He resigned as a minister on 12 June 2018. In a widely reported resignation statement, he said that his reason was so he could "better speak up for my constituents and country over how Brexit is currently being delivered". He went on to warn that the current approach to Brexit would damage businesses in his constituency, and that he could not support the government's opposition to Parliament deciding what happens if it rejects the final deal "because doing so breaches such fundamental principles of human rights and Parliamentary sovereignty". In early 2019 he became chair of Right to Vote, having already joined the People's Vote campaign for a public vote on the final Brexit deal between the UK and the European Union. On 1 June 2019 Bracknell Conservative Association passed a motion of no confidence in Lee, partly due to clashes over Lee's stance on Brexit, and partly due to dissatisfaction with his performance as the local MP.

=== Liberal Democrats ===
On 3 September 2019, Lee crossed the floor to join the Liberal Democrats during a speech by the Prime Minister over disagreements with the Conservative Party's handling of Brexit. His resignation left the Conservative government with no working majority in the House of Commons. In his letter of resignation to the Prime Minister, Lee stated that he had "reached the conclusion that it [was] no longer possible to serve [his] constituents' and country's best interests as a Conservative Member of Parliament." He went on to state: "Sadly, the Brexit process has helped to transform this once great [Conservative] Party in to something more akin to a narrow faction, where an individual's 'conservatism' is measured by how recklessly one wishes to leave the European Union. Perhaps most disappointingly, it has increasingly become infected with the twin diseases of populism and English nationalism." In the letter, Lee described the Liberal Democrats as being "best placed to build the unifying and inspiring political force needed to heal our divisions, unleash our talents, equip us to take the opportunities and overcome the challenges that we face as a society — and leave our country and our world in a better place for the next generations."

Lee's admission to the Lib Dems caused a number of LGBT+ members to quit the party, due to their perception of his voting record on LGBT+ rights. Lee responded saying that his record on LGBT+ rights had been misrepresented.

Lee contested the Wokingham constituency, adjoining his previous Bracknell seat and held by the strongly pro-brexit John Redwood, in the 2019 general election; but he was defeated by over 7,000 votes.

== Personal life ==
Lee is a keen sportsman. He has played competitive football, and followed Queens Park Rangers F.C. since the age of six. He has played competitive rugby union for Marlow Rugby Union Football Club and was a member of Oxford University RFC and has also played cricket for the Old Grumblers. Lee played for the Conservative Party's Parliamentary football team and is a member of the All Party Parliamentary Group on Boxing.

Parliament of the United Kingdom
Preceded by Andrew MacKay	Member of Parliament for Bracknell; 2010–2019	Succeeded by James Sunderland
