= 1982 Beaconsfield by-election =

UK parliamentary by-election

- 27 May 1982

Constituency of Beaconsfield
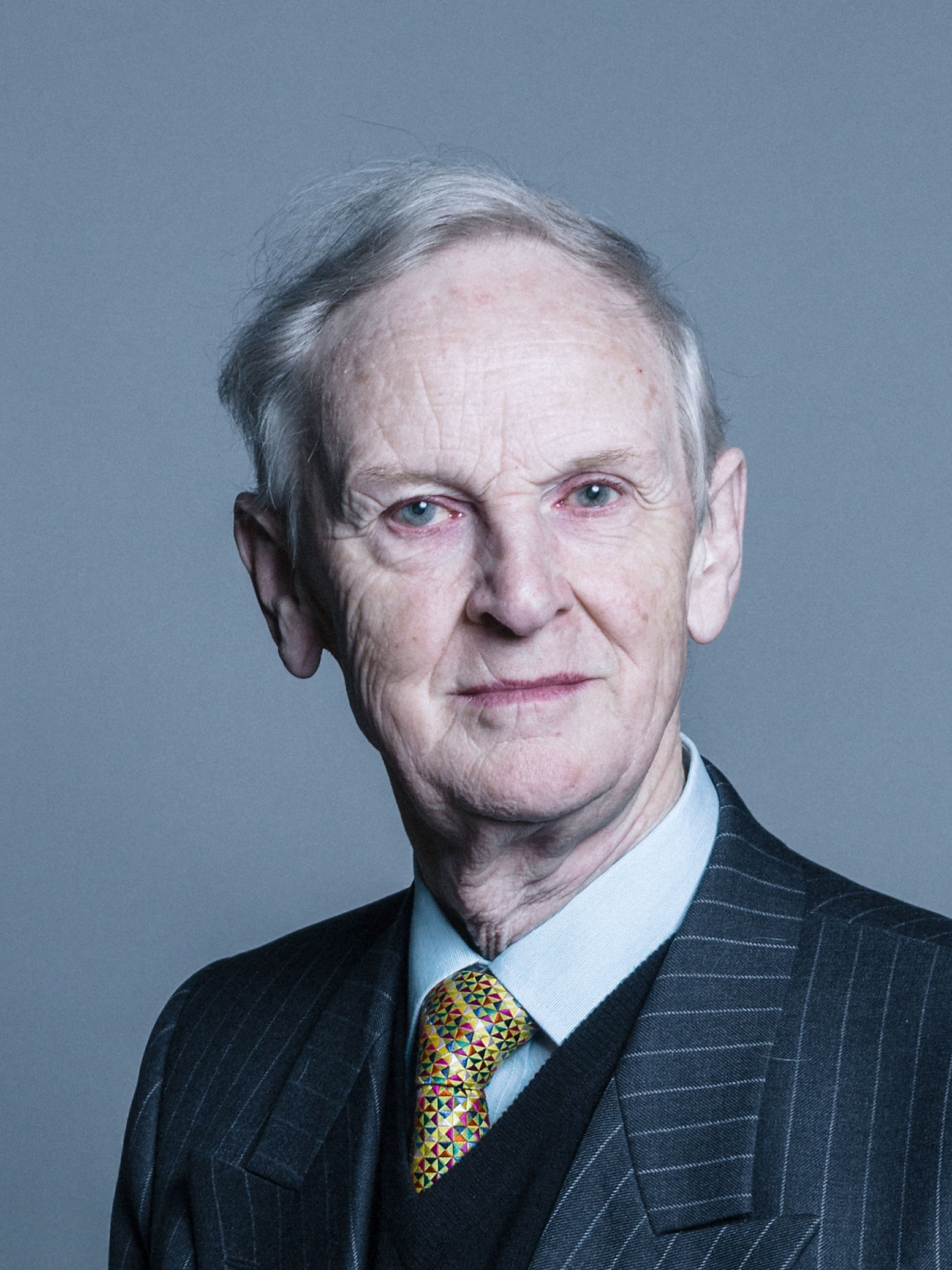

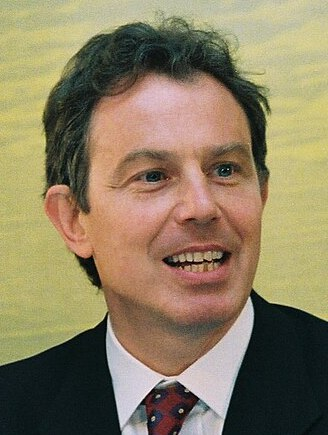
	First party	Second party	Third party
	Con
Candidate	Tim Smith	Paul Tyler	Tony Blair
Party	Conservative	Liberal	Labour
Popular vote	23,049	9,996	3,886
Percentage	61.8%	26.8%	10.4%
Swing	▲0.1%	▲8.7%	▼9.8%
MP before election
Ronald Bell
Conservative
Elected MP
Tim Smith
Conservative

The 1982 Beaconsfield by-election was a parliamentary by-election held on 27 May 1982 for the House of Commons constituency of Beaconsfield in Buckinghamshire.

== Previous MP ==
The seat had become vacant on 27 February 1982, when the constituency's Conservative Member of Parliament (MP), Sir Ronald Bell, died at the age of 67. He had been Beaconsfield's MP since the constituency was created for the February 1974 general election, having previously been MP for South Buckinghamshire since 1950. Bell had first entered Parliament at the Newport by-election in 1945, but lost that seat two months later at the 1945 general election.

== Candidates ==
The Conservative candidate was Tim Smith, aged 34, who had been the surprise winner of the 1977 Ashfield by-election, where he overturned a Labour Party majority of nearly 23,000 votes. However, he lost the Ashfield seat at the 1979 general election, and was seeking to return to Parliament.

The SDP–Liberal Alliance chose 40-year-old Paul Tyler, who had been Liberal Party MP for Bodmin from February 1974 to October 1974.

The Labour Party selected as its candidate an unknown and untested 29-year-old barrister called Tony Blair, an aspiring politician who had been advised by Labour MP Tom Pendry to seek the party's nomination to gain political experience.

Three other candidates stood, including Tom Keen, from the Campaign for a More Prosperous Britain, who held the record for the most candidacies in a single general election, and 78-year-old by-election veteran Bill Boaks, an eccentric campaigner for road safety, who usually described himself as "Air, Road, Public Safety, White Resident" or "Democratic Monarchist, Public Safety, White Resident". On this occasion, he chose the latter label.

== Election ==
Beaconsfield had been one of the safest seats held by the Conservative Party, and a Conservative victory was expected. The real fight was for second place; the Liberal candidate had finished a close third in 1979. Labour fought to remain the main opposition party for the seat.

In the March 1982 Glasgow Hillhead by-election, the SDP's Roy Jenkins won a traditionally Conservative seat for the Alliance, with Labour, previously the main challengers in Hillhead, in third place. With the SDP winning three of four by-elections since its formation in March 1981, The Glasgow Herald speculated that the new party threatened the Conservatives' hold on Beaconsfield. However, in the intervening weeks the Falklands War began.

The 53% turnout was almost 20 percentage points below 1979's, and unusually low for a by-election. Smith held the seat for the Conservatives, with a share of the vote comparable to the general election. The Glasgow Herald's William Russell stated that the outcome "firmly endorsed" the First Thatcher Ministry's conduct of the war. Party chairman Cecil Parkinson claimed that the result was better than he had expected.

Tyler increased the Alliance's share from 17.1% for Liberals in 1979 to 26.8%. Russell agreed with Liberal Whip Alan Beith's claim that the more than 9% increase was much better than expected, writing that "the Alliance bandwagon may have been temporally stalled" during the war, but the result had some positives for the Alliance.

Labour's vote was nearly halved from 20.2% in 1979 to 10.4%, and Blair lost his deposit. Russell described Blair ("a very good candidate") finishing in third place "a disaster" for Labour. The journalist attributed the poor outcome to "internal squabbling of the past year between Left and Right".

== Aftermath ==
Smith held the seat until the 1997 general election, when in March 1997 he was forced to stand down at the last minute over the cash-for-questions affair. He was replaced by Dominic Grieve.

Tyler was a senior campaign organiser for the Alliance at further elections in the 1980s, and returned to Parliament at the 1992 general election, as MP for North Cornwall. He stood down in 2005, and was made a life peer.

Despite the party's poor showing Blair was regarded as having fought a good campaign, and he was selected as Labour candidate for the newly created safe seat of Sedgefield in County Durham. He won Sedgefield at the 1983 general election, and after a successful career in opposition he won the Labour Party leadership election in 1994. He led Labour to a landslide victory at the 1997 general election, and became Prime Minister on 2 May 1997, a position he held until 27 June 2007.

== Result ==
By-election 1982: Beaconsfield
Party	Candidate	Votes	%	±%
Conservative	Tim Smith	23,049	61.8	+0.1
Liberal	Paul Tyler	9,996	26.8	+8.7
Labour	Tony Blair	3,886	10.4	−9.8
New Britain	Michael Byrne	225	0.6	New
Democratic Monarchist, Public Safety, White Resident	Bill Boaks	99	0.3	New
Benn in Ten Unless Proportional Representation	Thomas Keen	51	0.1	New
Majority		13,053	35.0	−8.2
Turnout		37,306		
Conservative hold		Swing		

== See also ==
- Beaconsfield constituency
- Beaconsfield
- Lists of United Kingdom by-elections
- United Kingdom by-election records
