= 1977 Ashfield by-election =

UK Parliamentary by-election

Ashfield constituency
Ashfield shown within Nottinghamshire, and Nottinghamshire shown within England

The 1977 Ashfield by-election was held on 28 April 1977 in the Ashfield constituency in the coal mining area of Nottinghamshire, following the resignation of Labour Member of Parliament David Marquand. Conservative candidate Tim Smith was the narrow winner in what was thought to have been a very safe Labour seat.

Marquand had resigned to take up a post at the European Commission in Brussels, as an advisor to the United Kingdom's newly appointed Commissioner Roy Jenkins. His majority at the October 1974 general election had been 22,915 votes, which made the seat look very safe.

There was another by-election held on the same day, in Tony Crosland's nearby former seat of Grimsby which looked much more marginal. Crosland had died on 19 February 1977. The Labour Party directed most of its campaign effort into saving Grimsby, believing Ashfield was in no danger. This strategy succeeded in saving Grimsby, but allowed Tim Smith to win by 264 votes (after a recount) over Labour's Michael Cowan.

The results in both Grimsby and Ashfield were seen as a surprise as they were the opposite of what had been expected. Though both contests saw a swing to the Conservatives, the swing in Grimsby was only 7% as opposed to almost 21% in Ashfield. Labour Cabinet Minister Roy Hattersley was reported to be "almost speechless" at the by election results which were announced at 02:00 the next day, while Conservative leader Margaret Thatcher stated that "This is one of the greatest by-election victories of all time."

The Liberal Party lost its deposit in Ashfield as well as in the Grimsby contest, the third time this had happened at by-election following the 1977 Lib-Lab Pact. These results were described as "devastating" for the Liberal leader David Steel.

Smith was unable to hold the seat at the 1979 general election, when Labour's Frank Haynes won with a majority of 7,797 votes. He was one of only five Conservative MPs to lose their seats at that election, four of whom had been by-election victors. Smith did however return to Parliament at another by-election three years later in Beaconsfield, Buckinghamshire (in which his Labour opponent was future Prime Minister Tony Blair) and would serve in that seat for 15 years. He was forced to stand down as an MP in 1997 after the cash for questions scandal.

== Result ==
United Kingdom Parliament: result of Ashfield by-election, 1977
Party	Candidate	Votes	%	±%
Conservative	Tim Smith	19,616	43.1	+20.3
Labour	Michael Cowan	19,352	42.5	−20.2
Liberal	Hampton Flint	4,380	9.6	−4.7
National Front	George Herrod	1,734	3.8	New
Socialist Workers	June Hall	453	1.0	New
Majority		264	0.6	N/A
Turnout		45,535		
Conservative gain from Labour		Swing	+20.8	
