= Gabriel's Lament =

1986 novel by Paul Bailey

- Author: Paul Bailey
- Published: Jonathan Cape, 1986
- Media type: Print
- Pages: 336
- Awards: Man Booker Nominee for shortlist 1986
- ISBN: 1857025881

Gabriel's Lament by Paul Bailey is a novel focusing on familial relationships in flux.

== Synopsis ==
Narrated by Gabriel Harvey, the novel is about the life of a boy whose life changes dramatically when his father inherits a large amount of money and his mother (who happens to be 35 years his father's junior), suddenly disappears. Gabriel at first thinks that his mother's leaving is temporary, but he comes to realize that indeed it is not. In the book we see how Gabriel gradually comes to terms with the fact that her disappearance is a complete separation from his life.

== Awards ==
- Number 181 on the Man Booker Shortlist for 2014.
- Booker Prize for Fiction, Shortlist for 1986

== Background ==
According to an article written by Jasper Rees, "mined some of [Bailey's] early experiences." He added, "You don't need to be Sigmund Freud to work out that Gabriel's Lament...find[s] Bailey still working through a sense of bereavement."

== Reception ==
Kirkus Reviews calls Gabriel's Lament "a handsome if tortured effort" and sees that "Bailey has a true, well-nigh Dickensian gift for characterization and an ability to write roundly entertaining comic monologues." while Publishers Weekly describes it as "an exotic blend of elements that, like strong English tea, leaves a powerful aftertaste."
