= Tim Smith (British politician) =

Former MP, in office 1982–1997

Member of Parliament
- In office 27 May 1982 – 8 April 1997
- Preceded by: Ronald Bell
- Succeeded by: Dominic Grieve
- Constituency: Beaconsfield
- In office 28 April 1977 – 7 April 1979
- Preceded by: David Marquand
- Succeeded by: Frank Haynes
- Constituency: Ashfield

Personal details
- Born: Timothy John Smith; 5 October 1947 (age 78) Plympton, Devon, England
- Political party: Conservative

Timothy John Smith (born 5 October 1947) is a British former Conservative politician.

== Politics ==
In 1977, Smith was selected as Conservative candidate for the Labour seat of Ashfield in Nottinghamshire at the by-election that had been called following the resignation of David Marquand. Ashfield was regarded as a safe seat for Labour, but on 28 April, Smith won an upset victory when he overturned Marquand's October 1974 majority of 22,915 to win by 264 votes over Labour's Michael Cowan. However, Smith was unable to hold the seat in the 1979 general election.

He was selected to contest the 1982 Beaconsfield by-election, in which he defeated the Labour candidate, future Prime Minister Tony Blair. Smith was thereafter returned as MP by the Beaconsfield constituency at each general election until 1997.

== Scandal ==
During the "cash-for-questions affair" it was revealed that he had taken undeclared payments of between £18,000 and £25,000 from Mohamed Al-Fayed, the owner of Harrods, much of it allegedly handed over in envelopes stuffed with £50 notes. In May 1997, at the subsequent general election, Smith stood down and left politics altogether.

On 3 July 1997, he was found guilty by Sir Gordon Downey of taking cash for questions from Al Fayed, along with Neil Hamilton. The report severely criticised the conduct of both Hamilton and Smith whilst they had been MPs, and said that had they remained MPs they would have faced a substantial suspension from the House of Commons.

Smith now lives in Boyton, Cornwall.

== See also ==
- 1977 Ashfield by-election
- 1982 Beaconsfield by-election

Parliament of the United Kingdom
Preceded by David Marquand	Member of Parliament for Ashfield; 1977–1979	Succeeded by Frank Haynes
Preceded by Sir Ronald Bell	Member of Parliament for Beaconsfield; 1982–1997	Succeeded by Dominic Grieve
