= David Marquand =

British politician (1934–2024)

David Marquand FBA FRHistS FRSA

Principal of Mansfield College, Oxford
- In office 1996–2002
- Preceded by: Dennis John Trevelyan
- Succeeded by: Diana Walford

Member of Parliament
- In office 31 March 1966 – 5 April 1977
- Preceded by: William Warbey
- Succeeded by: Tim Smith
- Constituency: Ashfield

Personal details
- Born: 20 September 1934 Cardiff, Wales
- Died: 23 April 2024 (aged 89)
- Party: Plaid Cymru (2016–2024)
- Other political affiliations: Labour (until 1981; 1995–2003; 2010–16); SDP (1981–88); Liberal Democrats (1988–92)
- Spouse: Judith Mary Reed (m. 1959)
- Education: Magdalen College, Oxford; St Antony's College, Oxford; University of California, Berkeley

David Ian Marquand FBA FRHistS FRSA FLSW (20 September 1934 – 23 April 2024) was a British academic and Labour Party Member of Parliament (MP).

== Background and political career ==
Marquand was born in Cardiff on 20 September 1934. His father was Hilary Marquand, also an academic and former Labour MP. His younger brother, the late Richard Marquand, and his nephew, James Marquand, became film directors. Marquand was educated at Emanuel School in Battersea, London, Magdalen College, Oxford, St Antony's College, Oxford, and at the University of California, Berkeley.

Marquand first stood for Parliament at the Welsh seat of Barry in 1964, but lost to the Conservative incumbent Raymond Gower. He was elected the MP for Ashfield in 1966 and served in the House of Commons until 1977, when he resigned his seat to work as Chief Advisor (from 1977 to 1978) to his mentor Roy Jenkins, who had been appointed President of the European Commission.

During the 1970s split between "Croslandite" and "Jenkinsite" social democrats within the Labour Party, Marquand was part of the Jenkins group and joined the Social Democratic Party (SDP) when it was founded. Marquand sat on the party's national committee from 1981 until 1988 and was an unsuccessful candidate for the party in the High Peak constituency in the 1983 general election. When the SDP merged with the Liberal Party to form the Liberal Democrats, Marquand remained with the successor party until rejoining the Labour Party in 1995, following the election of Tony Blair as Labour leader. In October 2016, it was reported that Marquand had left Labour once more, and had joined Plaid Cymru, though he remained hopeful for anti-Conservative parties to work together in the aftermath of the vote for Brexit.

Marquand died on 23 April 2024, at the age of 89.

== Academic career and writings ==
Marquand's academic career began as lecturer in Politics at the University of Sussex and included the occupancy of two chairs in Politics, first at Salford and then at Sheffield and finally as Principal of Mansfield College, Oxford. At the time of his death, Marquand was a visiting fellow in the Department of Politics at the University of Oxford and Honorary Professor of Politics at the University of Sheffield.

Marquand's writings are broadly based upon issues surrounding British politics and social democracy. He is widely linked to the term "progressive politics" and the concept of a "progressive dilemma" in British politics, although while he continued to advocate the ideas behind the term, he later distanced himself from the shorthand term itself. Marquand wrote extensively on the future of the European Union and the need for constitutional reform in the United Kingdom.

In the aftermath of Labour's defeat in the 1979 election, Marquand wrote "Inquest on a Movement: Labour's Defeat and Its Consequences" for the July 1979 issue of Encounter. He argued that the influx of middle-class radicals into the Labour Party during the interwar years had transformed Labour from a trade union pressure group into the main progressive party. All of its leaders since 1935 (when Clement Attlee took the helm) and many of its most prominent members had come from this class, crucially shaping the party's ethos. However, with Labour moving to the left in the 1970s, Marquand believed that the party was becoming intolerantly proletarian and attached to an old-fashioned socialism. This change in the party was symbolised by the 1976 election as party leader of James Callaghan, the least intellectual of the six candidates. Marquand wrote that Labour had "outlived its usefulness" as a means to progressive social change and that middle-class radicals needed a new platform for their ideas. For this article Marquand was awarded (jointly with E. P. Thompson) the George Orwell Memorial Prize for 1980. In the 1980s Marquand was co-editor of The Political Quarterly.

Marquand addressed Britain's relative economic decline in The Unprincipled Society (1988) and The New Reckoning (1997). He argued that this decline was caused by Britain's failure to become a developmental state like France, Germany and Japan. In those countries state intervention had encouraged industrial development and had facilitated the necessary adjustments to competition. Britain, however, was wedded to a rigid economic liberalism which prevented the state from undertaking the necessary measures to meet the country's developmental needs. In The New Reckoning Marquand wrote: "The economies that have succeeded more spectacularly have been those fostered by developmental states, where public power, acting in concert with private interest, has induced market forces to flow in the desired direction."

Originally a tentative supporter of Tony Blair's New Labour, he later became a trenchant critic, arguing that "New Labour has 'modernised' the social-democratic tradition out of all recognition", even while retaining the over-centralisation and disdain for the radical intelligentsia of the old "Labourite" tradition. He was one of 20 signatories to the founding statement of the democratic left-wing group Compass.

In August 2008, Marquand published an article in The Guardian newspaper which was complimentary about Conservative Party leader David Cameron. Marquand called Cameron not a crypto-Thatcherite but a Whig and argued that Cameron "offers inclusion, social harmony and evolutionary adaptation to the cultural and socio-economic changes of his age."

Marquand was among 30 people to sign a letter to The Guardian, headlined "Lib Dems Are The Party of Progress," in support of the Liberal Democrats at 2010 general election but withdrew this support less than a month after the election. Marquand rejoined the Labour Party and came out in full support of the then leader Ed Miliband.

Marquand was elected a Fellow of the British Academy in 1998. He is recognised by the newly opened Marquand Reading Room at his old school, Emanuel School in London. He was elected a Fellow of the Learned Society of Wales in 2013.

== Bibliography ==
- Ramsay MacDonald, Jonathan Cape, 1977; reprinted Metro Books, London, 1997.
- "Inquest on a Movement: Labour’s Defeat & Its Consequences," Encounter, July 53, 1979
- Parliament for Europe, Jonathan Cape, 1979
- (w. David Butler), British politics and European elections, Longmans, 1981
- (ed.) John Mackintosh on Parliament and Social Democracy, Longmans, 1982
- The Unprincipled Society, Fontana Press, London, 1988
- (w. Colin Crouch (eds.)), The New Centralism: Britain Out of Step in Europe?, Blackwell, Oxford, 1989
- (w. Colin Crouch (eds.)), 'The Politics of 1992: Beyond the Single European Market, Blackwell, Oxford, 1990
- (w. Colin Crouch (eds.)), Towards Greater Europe? A Continent Without an Iron Curtain, Blackwell, Oxford, 1992
- (w. Colin Crouch (eds.)), Ethics and Markets: Cooperation and Competition within Capitalist Economies, Blackwell, Oxford, 1993
- (w. Colin Crouch (eds.)) Re-inventing Collective Action, from the global to the local, Blackwell, 1995
- (w. Seldon A (eds.)), The Ideas that Shaped Post-War Britain, Fontana Press, London, 1996
- 'Community and the Left', in Giles Radice (ed.), What Needs to Change: New Visions for Britain, HarperCollins, London, 1996
- The New Reckoning: Capitalism, States and Citizens, Polity Press, Oxford, 1997
- Must Labour win?, Fabian Society, London, 1998
- "Premature Obsequies: Social Democracy Comes in From the Cold," The New Social Democracy, Blackwell, Oxford, 1999
- The Progressive Dilemma: From Lloyd George to Blair, Phoenix Giant, London, 1999
- "Pluralism vs. Popularism," Prospect, June 1999
- (w. Ronald Nettler), Religion and Democracy, Blackwell, Oxford, 2000
- "Can Blair Kill off Britain’s Tory state at last?," New Statesman, 14 May 2001
- The Decline of the Public: The Hollowing Out of Citizenship, Polity Press, Cambridge, 2004
- "The public domain is a gift of history. Now it is at risk," New Statesman, 19 January 2004
- "A direct line to the Almighty," New Statesman, 2 May 2005
- "A leader I’d have followed," New Statesman, 15 August 2005
- "The betrayal of social democracy…," New Statesman, 16 January 2006
- Britain Since 1918: The Strange Career Of British Democracy, Weidenfeld and Nicolson, London, 2008
- "Mammon's kingdom: An essay on Britain, Now", Allen Lane, 2014

Parliament of the United Kingdom
Preceded by William Warbey	Member of Parliament for Ashfield; 1966–1977	Succeeded by Tim Smith
