= Joy Morrissey =

American-British politician (born 1981)

Joy Morrissey MP
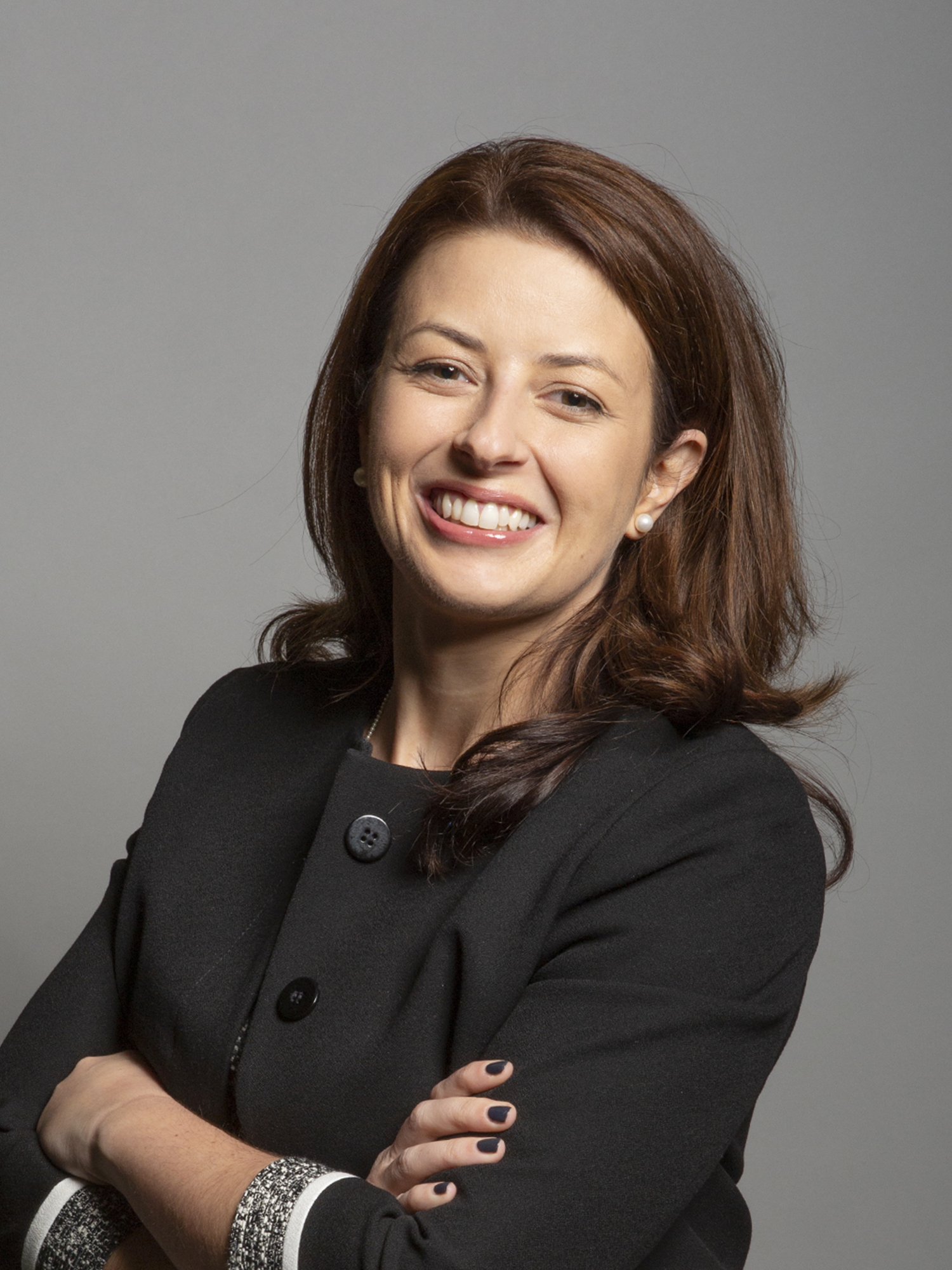
- Official portrait, 2019

Shadow Minister for Women and Equalities
- Incumbent
- Assumed office 31 August 2026
- Leader: Kemi Badenoch
- Preceded by: Claire Coutinho; Mims Davies

Opposition Deputy Chief Whip in the House of Commons
- In office 6 November 2024 – 31 August 2026 Serving with Gagan Mohindra
- Leader: Kemi Badenoch
- Preceded by: Mark Tami
Junior shadow roles 2024
Shadow Minister for Energy Security and Net Zero
In office 19 July 2024 – 6 November 2024
Leader	Rishi Sunak
Preceded by	Kerry McCarthy
Succeeded by	Andrew Bowie
Opposition Whip
In office 19 July 2024 – 6 November 2024
Leader	Rishi Sunak
Junior ministerial roles 2022–2024
Lord Commissioner of the Treasury
In office 14 November 2023 – 5 July 2024
Prime Minister	Rishi Sunak
Preceded by	Steve Double
Succeeded by	Anna Turley
Assistant Government Whip
In office 8 July 2022 – 14 November 2023
Prime Minister	Boris Johnson; Liz Truss; Rishi Sunak
Preceded by	Andrea Jenkyns
Succeeded by	Aaron Bell
Parliamentary Private Secretary to the Prime Minister
In office 8 February 2022 – 8 July 2022 Serving with Lia Nici and James Duddridge
Prime Minister	Boris Johnson
Preceded by	Andrew Griffith; Sarah Dines
Succeeded by	Alexander Stafford

Member of Parliament for Beaconsfield
- Incumbent
- Assumed office 12 December 2019
- Preceded by: Dominic Grieve
- Majority: 5,445 (11.2%)

Ealing London Borough Councillor for Hanger Hill
- In office 22 May 2014 – 13 April 2020

Personal details
- Born: Joyce Rebekah Inboden; 30 January 1981 (age 45) Indiana, U.S.
- Party: Conservative
- Spouses: Matthew Mark Damschroder (m. 2001, divorced); William Morrissey (after 2001)
- Children: 1
- Education: Ohio State University (BA); London School of Economics (MSc)
- Website: joymorrissey.uk

Joyce Rebekah "Joy" Morrissey (née Inboden; born 30 January 1981) is an American-born British Conservative Party politician who has served as the Member of Parliament (MP) for Beaconsfield since 2019. She has been Shadow Minister for Women and Equalities since 2026, and was a Lord Commissioner of the Treasury from November 2023 until July 2024. She was Opposition Deputy Chief Whip in the House of Commons from 2024 to 2026, serving alongside Gagan Mohindra.

Morrissey grew up in the United States, moving to the United Kingdom in 2008 to attend the London School of Economics. Before doing so, in 1999 and 2000, Morrissey undertook humanitarian work in Albania, Kosovo, China, and India, helping refugees, working in an orphanage and teaching English. Before her election to Parliament she worked at the Centre for Social Justice, as a Parliamentary staffer, and was elected a Councillor in Ealing.

== Early life and education ==
Joyce Morrissey was born on 30 January 1981 in Indiana, United States. She attended Worthington Christian School in Ohio and graduated in 1999. Morrissey received a master's degree specialising in European Social Policy from the London School of Economics. After completing her postgraduate studies, Morrissey attained British citizenship and is now a British-American dual national.

== Acting career ==
In the late 2000s, Morrissey had a brief acting career. Under the name Joy Boden she appeared alongside Marisa Tomei in a TV movie titled The Rich Inner Life of Penelope Cloud, which she also produced, and which her now-husband directed. After becoming a mother, she decided not to return to the film industry, stating that she "actually looked at going back to get (her) PhD in International Development but got involved with the local Ealing Conservatives".

== Political career ==
Morrissey was an elected a Conservative councillor on Ealing Council, where she represented the ward of Hanger Hill until April 2020.

She was a London-wide list candidate at the 2016 London Assembly election, but was not elected.

At the snap 2017 general election, Morrissey stood as the Conservative candidate in Ealing Central and Acton, coming second with 34.7% of the vote behind the incumbent Labour MP Rupa Huq.

In 2018, she sought nomination to be the London Conservatives mayoral candidate for the 2021 London mayoral election, making it through to the final three shortlist; Morrissey was ultimately not selected.

== Parliamentary career ==
Morrissey was elected to Parliament as MP for Beaconsfield at the 2019 general election with 56.1% of the vote and a majority of 15,712.

In April 2020, Morrissey was appointed Parliamentary Private Secretary (PPS) to the Foreign and Commonwealth Office. She was appointed PPS to the Deputy Prime Minister and Secretary of State for Justice, Dominic Raab in October 2020.

On 15 December 2021, Morrissey criticised the influence that unelected public health officials were able to exert on public policy during the COVID-19 pandemic, arguing that policy decisions should be made by those accountable to the public.

In February 2022, she was appointed as a PPS to the Prime Minister, working alongside Lia Nici and James Duddridge.

Morrissey endorsed Liz Truss in the July–September 2022 Conservative Party leadership election.

Morrissey was appointed Assistant Government Whip on 8 July 2022 by the outgoing Johnson administration. On 8 September 2022 she was reappointed an Assistant Government Whip as part of the new Government of Prime Minister Liz Truss, one of very few people to make the transition from the Johnson to the Truss administration.

On 27 October 2022 Morrissey was reappointed an Assistant Government Whip once again by her third Prime Minister, Rishi Sunak.

In February 2023, Morrissey was re-selected as the Conservative candidate for Beaconsfield at the 2024 general election.

In June 2023, she was one of six Conservative MPs to vote against censuring Boris Johnson following the Commons Privileges Committee investigation.

In November 2023, Morrissey celebrated the decision by the British government to block the development of a data centre on the site of a former quarry next to the M25.

At the 2024 general election, Morrissey was re-elected to Parliament as MP for Beaconsfield with a decreased vote share of 38.8% and a decreased majority of 5,455. She was appointed Shadow Minister for Energy Security and Net Zero and an Opposition whip in the Opposition frontbench of Rishi Sunak July 2024.

Parliament of the United Kingdom
Preceded by Dominic Grieve	Member of Parliament for Beaconsfield; 2019–present	Incumbent
Political offices
Preceded by Andrew Griffith	Parliamentary Private Secretary to the Prime Minister; 2022; With: Sarah Dines; Lia Nici; James Duddridge	Succeeded by Alexander Stafford
Party political offices
Vacant Title last held by Marcus Jones	Conservative Deputy Chief Whip in the House of Commons; 2024–present Served alongside: Gagan Mohindra	Incumbent
