= Frank Haynes (politician) =

British politician

Member of Parliament for Ashfield
- In office 3 May 1979 – 16 March 1992
- Preceded by: Tim Smith
- Succeeded by: Geoff Hoon

Personal details
- Born: 8 March 1926 Wandsworth, London, England
- Died: 11 September 1998 (aged 72) Westwood, Nottinghamshire, England
- Party: Labour

David Francis Haynes (8 March 1926 – 11 September 1998) was a British politician. A member of the Labour Party, he served as the Member of Parliament (MP) for Ashfield from 1979 to 1992.

Born in Wandsworth, London, a former miner, Haynes became the MP for Ashfield in 1979, regaining a seat that had been lost to the Conservatives in a 1977 by-election. Haynes served until 1992 when he retired and was succeeded by Geoff Hoon.

Haynes was famous for having one of the loudest and most resonant voices in the House of Commons. He was sponsored by the National Union of Mineworkers, and during the 1984–85 strike remained loyal to the union rather than support the majority of Nottinghamshire miners who broke away to form the Union of Democratic Mineworkers. He frequently highlighted the problems of the very poorest in society when putting questions to Margaret Thatcher and her ministers.

Haynes died in Westwood, Nottinghamshire, in September 1998 at the age of 72.

Parliament of the United Kingdom
Preceded by Tim Smith	Member of Parliament for Ashfield; 1979–1992	Succeeded by Geoff Hoon
