= Gloria De Piero =

British Labour politician

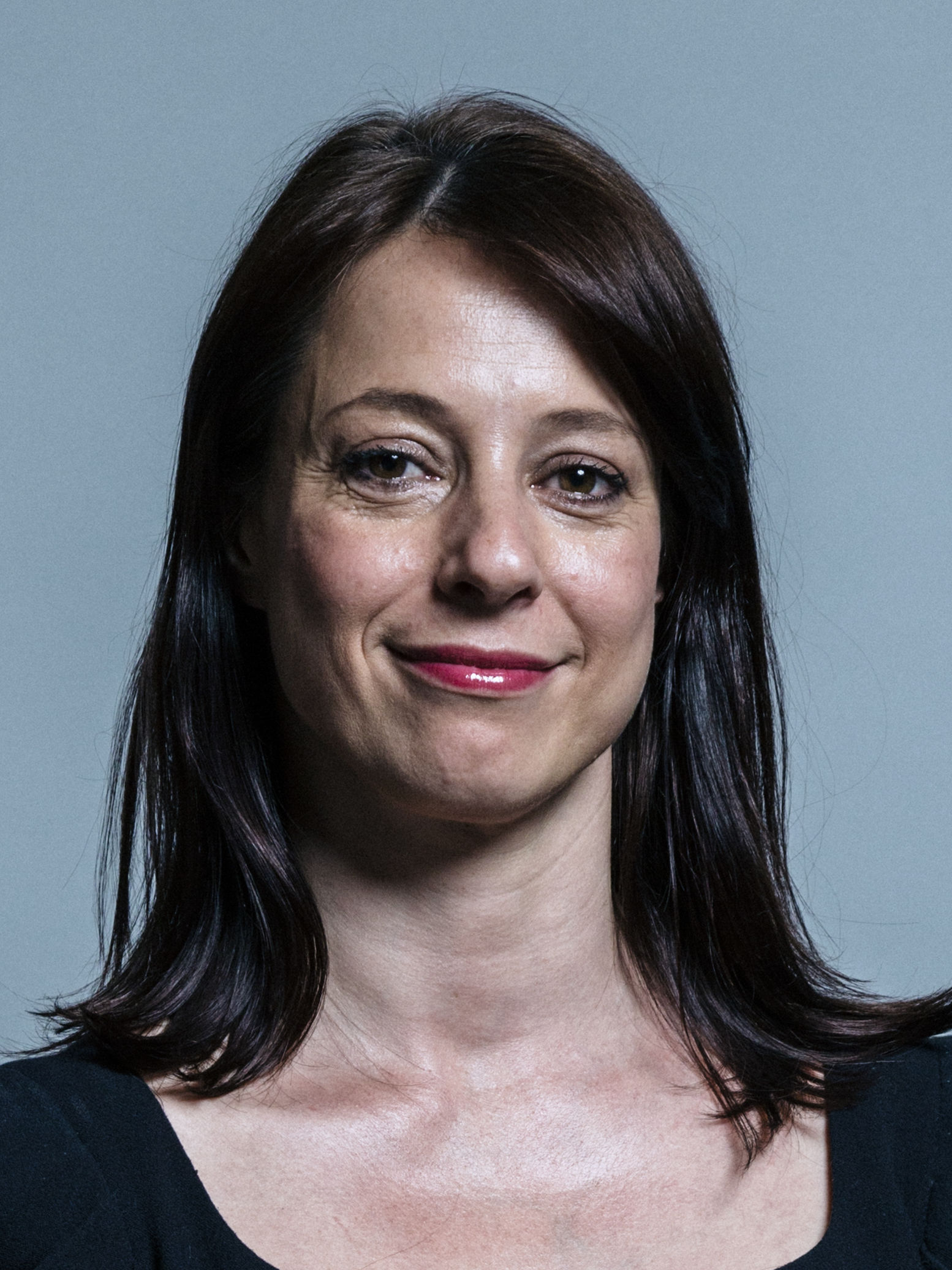
- Official portrait, 2017

Member of Parliament for Ashfield
- In office 6 May 2010 – 6 November 2019
- Preceded by: Geoff Hoon
- Succeeded by: Lee Anderson
Shadow portfolios
Shadow cabinet
2015–2016	Young People and Voter Registration
2013–2015	Women and Equalities
Shadow Frontbench
2017–2019	Justice
2011–2013	Crime Prevention
2010–2011	Culture

Personal details
- Born: 21 December 1972 (age 53) Bradford, West Riding of Yorkshire, England
- Party: Labour
- Other political affiliations: Alliance for Workers' Liberty (Formerly)
- Spouse: James Robinson (m. 2012)
- Education: University of Central England (BA); University of London (MSc)

Gloria De Piero (born 21 December 1972) is a British broadcaster and former Labour Party politician who served as Member of Parliament (MP) for Ashfield in Nottinghamshire from 2010 to 2019.

De Piero began her television career at the BBC and ITV, and was political editor of GMTV from 2003 to 2010. De Piero returned to broadcasting in 2020, and has been a presenter on GB News since 2021.

De Piero was appointed to the opposition front bench in 2010, and served in the shadow cabinets of Ed Miliband and Jeremy Corbyn between 2013 and 2016.

== Early life ==
Gloria De Piero was born on 21 December 1972 in Bradford, West Riding of Yorkshire, England to Giorgio and Maddalena De Piero. Her parents are Italian immigrants who moved to the United Kingdom to work in Bradford's textile mills. Her father had a mental health crisis when she was around the age of nine. This resulted in him requiring admissions to psychiatric hospitals throughout her childhood. His mental health meant that he could not continue to work, and De Piero's mother gave up her job to look after him, and the family lived on benefits.

De Piero attended Yorkshire Martyrs Catholic College where she obtained five GCSEs, and Bradford College where she gained two D A-levels. During her youth, De Piero was a member of Socialist Organiser, and joined the Labour Party's student wing Labour Students at the age of 18. De Piero then studied sociology at the University of Central England (now Birmingham City University) and the University of Westminster, graduating with a first. She was involved in the Labour Students' campaign in 1996–1997 as one of its national officers based in London. Following the 1997 general election which resulted in the Labour Party winning in a landslide, De Piero applied for several government positions including as a special adviser, parliamentary researcher, and at left-wing think tanks, but failed to gain employment.

== Media career ==
De Piero worked as a researcher for ITV's Jonathan Dimbleby show. She then moved to the BBC where she worked at On the Record. While working at the BBC, she completed a master's degree at Birkbeck, University of London. From 2003 to 2010, she was the political editor for GMTV.

On 2 June 2020, De Piero was announced as a presenter on the new Times Radio station. She presented her own show on Friday mornings, and co-presented the Sunday morning political show G&T alongside the former political editor of The Sun, Tom Newton Dunn. In April 2021 she announced that she was joining the weekday afternoon programme of GB News, a new TV channel. In August it was announced that De Piero would host a new political programme on the channel: The Briefing: Lunchtime with Gloria De Piero. She launched interview show Gloria Meets on the network in November 2022. She currently co-hosts GBN's Wednesday lunchtime Prime Minister's Questions show.

== Parliamentary career ==
=== 2010 to 2015 ===
In February 2010, De Piero resigned as GMTV's political editor to seek selection as the Labour candidate for the Ashfield constituency in the 2010 general election. The candidacy became vacant following the announcement that the constituency's Labour MP, former Defence Secretary Geoff Hoon, would be stepping down at the election. On 21 March, she was selected as the party's candidate. De Piero was elected with a majority of 192 votes (reduced from 10,213 in 2005) after a 17.2% swing to the Liberal Democrats. During her election campaign, it was reported that she had posed for topless photographs for a modelling agency at the age of 15. Three years later, an unnamed news agency attempted to buy the photographs on behalf of a national newspaper. It later emerged that The Mail on Sunday had purchased the photographs in 2010. De Piero issued a legal warning to the newspaper that she had been underage when the photographs were taken and the negatives were returned to her with an apology.

In October 2010, Labour leader Ed Miliband appointed De Piero as a shadow culture minister. In the 2011 reshuffle, De Piero became Shadow Minister for Crime Prevention, and in 2013, she was promoted to the shadow cabinet as Shadow Minister for Women and Equalities.

In 2012, De Piero held a national roadshow called Why Do People Hate Me? to discover why voters were so disenchanted with politicians. She interviewed six groups of people including retired miners and warehouse workers.

=== 2015 to 2019 ===
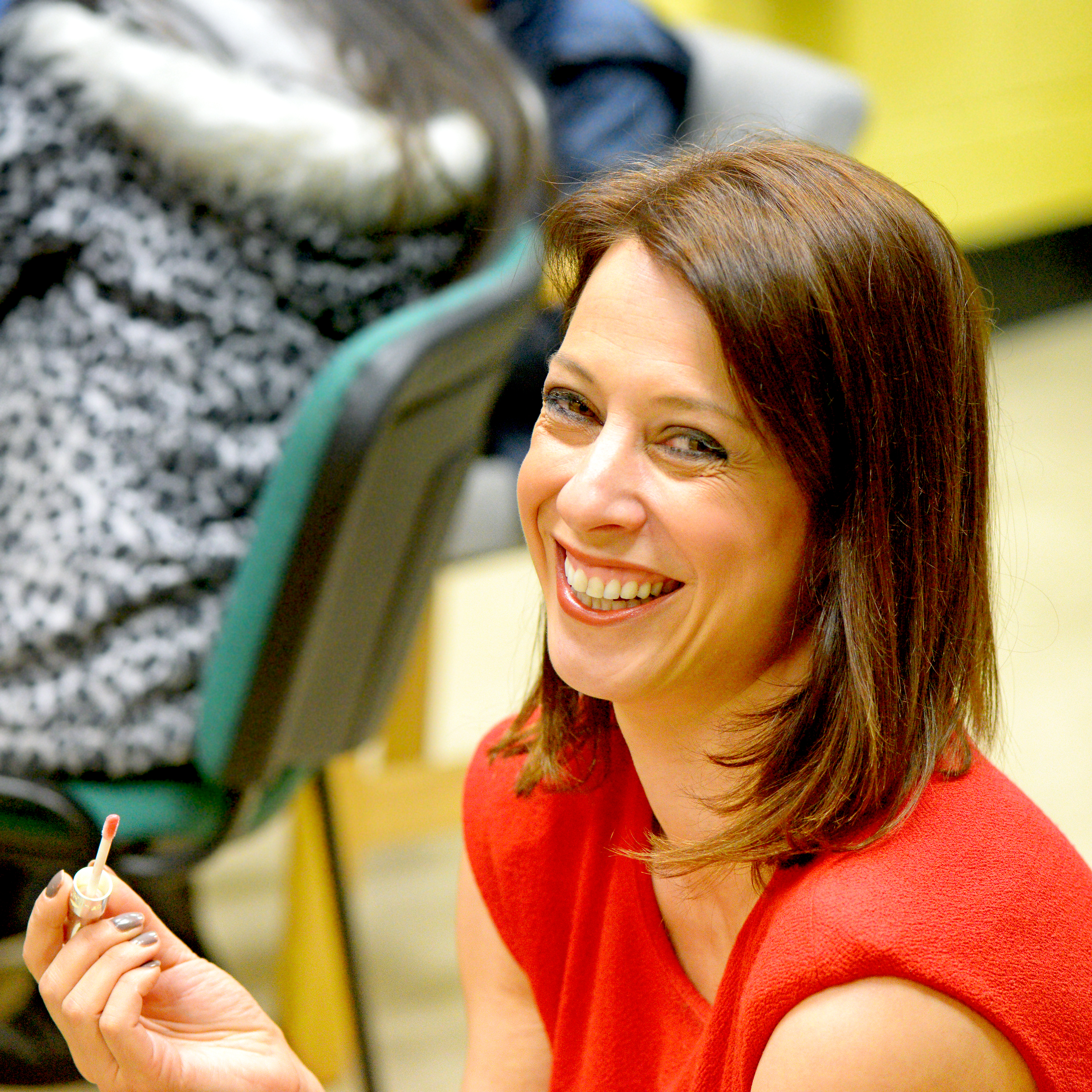
De Piero in Bradford in 2015

At the 2015 general election, De Piero held Ashfield with an increased majority of 8,820. In September 2015, De Piero was elected to the Labour Party's Conference Arrangements Committee with 109,888 votes. In new Labour leader Jeremy Corbyn's first shadow cabinet, De Piero was made Shadow Minister for Young People and Voter Registration, a new shadow cabinet-level role. She resigned her shadow cabinet position on 26 June 2016, among dozens of her colleagues, believing Corbyn could not lead the party to a general election victory.

De Piero supported the UK remaining within the European Union (EU) in the 2016 UK EU membership referendum, and was present with Corbyn at the launch of the Labour In for Britain campaign. Approximately 70% of her constituents voted for the UK to leave the EU. She supported Owen Smith in the failed attempt to replace Corbyn in the 2016 Labour leadership election.

At the June 2017 general election, De Piero's majority in Ashfield fell to just 441 votes. The following month, she accepted a place in Corbyn's shadow front-bench team as Shadow Justice Minister.

In the indicative votes on 27 March 2019, De Piero voted for the Norway-plus model, and to a customs union with the EU. After prime minister Boris Johnson's Brexit deal was approved by Parliament, De Piero expressed regret that she failed to vote in favour of Theresa May's earlier Brexit proposal.

In October 2019, De Piero was one of nineteen Labour MPs to break a three-line whip and vote to pass Boris Johnson's initial EU withdrawal agreement bill, setting in motion the events leading to the 2019 general election.

In July 2019, she resigned from the shadow front-bench and announced that she would not stand at the next general election. On 12 December 2019, she was succeeded as Member of Parliament for Ashfield, Nottinghamshire by politician Lee Anderson, her former office manager. Anderson was elected as a Conservative but now sits as a Reform UK MP, having been re-elected as a Reform UK MP at the 2024 General Election.

== Personal life ==
De Piero married James Robinson in 2012. Robinson was a media correspondent at The Guardian, media editor at The Observer and an employee at PR firm Powerscourt. He was the director of communications for former deputy leader of the Labour Party Tom Watson.

In 2026, the couples marital home was raided by the police, who executed a search warrant, in connection with an investigation into Chinese espionage in the United Kingdom. No arrests or questioning of the occupiers took place.

Parliament of the United Kingdom
Preceded by Geoff Hoon	Member of Parliament for Ashfield; 2010–2019	Succeeded by Lee Anderson
Political offices
New office	Shadow Minister for Culture; 2010–2011	Succeeded by Dan Jarvis
New office	Shadow Minister for Crime Prevention; 2011–2013	Succeeded by Steve Reed
Preceded by Yvette Cooper	Shadow Minister for Women and Equalities; 2013–2015	Succeeded by Kate Green
New office	Shadow Minister for Young People and Voter Registration; 2015–2016	Succeeded by Cat Smith as Shadow Minister for Voter Engagement and Youth Affairs
Preceded by Christina Rees	Shadow Minister for Justice; 2017–2019	Succeeded by Bambos Charalambous
