= George Orwell Memorial Prize =

The George Orwell Memorial Prize was an annual prize awarded by Penguin Publishing for articles or essays on current political, cultural or social issues.

Penguin announced the founding of the Prize on 2 January 1976. The award for the first year was £500, with the winner chosen by a panel of five judges. Only articles that had been published in Britain during the past year were eligible for the Prize. The article also had to be sponsored by the editor of the publication that it appeared in. In 1977 the award was raised to £750.

== Winners ==
Year	Winner(s)
1976	Ludvík Vaculík, 'Impermissible Thoughts', Index on Censorship, Vol 4, Issue 4 (1 December 1975), pp. 12–14.
1977	John Berger, 'Drawn to that Moment', New Society.
1978	Paul Bailey, 'The Limitations of Despair', The Listener.
1979	Christopher Ricks, 'Geoffrey Hill and the Tongue's Atrocity', Times Literary Supplement.
1980	David Marquand, 'Inquest on a Movement: Labour's Defeat & Its Consequences', Encounter (July 1979), pp. 8–17. E. P. Thompson for a series of articles that appeared in New Society on the rule of law in relation to the ABC trial.
1986	Richard Thornley for his film-project Coyote.
