= Paul Bailey (British writer) =

English novelist (1937–2024)

- Born: Peter Harry Bailey; 16 February 1937; Battersea, London, England
- Died: 27 October 2024 (aged 87)
- Education: Central School of Speech and Drama
- Occupations: Novelist; critic
- Partners: David Healy (1964; died 1986); Jeremy Trevathan (1990-2024)
- Writing career
- Period: 1964–2019

Peter Harry "Paul" Bailey FRSL (16 February 1937 – 27 October 2024) was an English novelist and critic, as well as a biographer of Cynthia Payne and Quentin Crisp.

== Background ==
Peter Harry Bailey was born in Battersea, south London, on 16 February 1937. He attended Sir Walter St John's Grammar School For Boys in Battersea. He won a scholarship to the Central School of Speech and Drama in 1953 and worked as an actor between 1956 and 1964, during which he adopted the name Paul Bailey.

== Career ==
Bailey began to pursue writing in between acting jobs, and his first novel, At the Jerusalem, was published in 1967. The book, set in an old people's home, won a Somerset Maugham Award and an Arts Council Writers' Award. Later books included Peter Smart's Confessions (1977) and Gabriel's Lament (1986), both shortlisted for the Booker Prize; and Sugar Cane (1993), a sequel to Gabriel's Lament. Kitty and Virgil (1998) is the story of the relationship between an Englishwoman and an exiled Romanian poet. In Uncle Rudolf (2002), the narrator looks back on his colourful life and his rescue as a young boy from a likely death in fascist Romania, by his uncle, a gifted lyric tenor and the novel's eponymous hero. In his book Chapman's Odyssey (2011), the main character, Harry Chapman, in morphine-induced delirium, encounters characters from literature, writers, deceased friends and family members as he lies seriously ill in a London hospital. Despite his melancholy and fear, Harry entertains the nurses with recitations of some of the favourite poems he has memorised in a lifetime of reading. Bailey's last book was The Prince's Boy (2014), a melancholic gay love story that spans four decades.

He was appointed Literary Fellow at Newcastle and Durham Universities (1972–74), and was awarded a Bicentennial Fellowship in 1976, enabling him to travel to the U.S., where he was Visiting Lecturer in English Literature at the North Dakota State University (1977–79). He was awarded the E. M. Forster Award in 1974 and in 1978 he won the George Orwell Memorial Prize for his essay "The Limitations of Despair", first published in The Listener magazine. Bailey was elected a Fellow of the Royal Society of Literature in 1999.

Bailey also wrote plays for radio and television: At Cousin Henry's was broadcast in 1964 and his adaptation of J. R. Ackerley's We Think the World of You was televised in 1980. His non-fiction books include a volume of memoir, entitled An Immaculate Mistake: Scenes from Childhood and Beyond (1990), and Three Queer Lives: An Alternative Biography of Naomi Jacob, Fred Barnes and Arthur Marshall (2001), a biography of three gay popular entertainers from the twentieth century.

Bailey wrote the introduction to the 1987 edition of If this is a Man, The Truce by Primo Levi.

Bailey was also known as a literary critic, and contributor to The Guardian and in 2001 headed an all-male "alternative" judging panel for the Orange Prize. In 2003 he joined the staff on Kingston University's creative writing course, where he continued to teach as Senior Distinguished Research Fellow until his death. From 2010 to 2019, he wrote theatre criticism for The Oldie.

== Personal life and death ==
Bailey was in a relationship with costume designer David Healy from 1964 until Healy's death in 1986. In 1990 he began a relationship with book publisher Jeremy Trevathan, with whom he entered a civil partnership in 2016. Bailey died on 27 October 2024, at the age of 87.

== Bibliography ==
- At The Jerusalem (1967) – winner of the Authors' Club Best First Novel Award and Somerset Maugham Award
- Trespasses (1970)
- A Distant Likeness (1973)
- Peter Smart's Confessions (1977), shortlisted for the Booker Prize
- Old Soldiers (1980)
- An English Madam: The Life and Work of Cynthia Payne (1982)
- Gabriel's Lament (1986), shortlisted for the Booker Prize
- An Immaculate Mistake: Scenes from Childhood and Beyond (1990)
- Sugar Cane (1993)
- The Oxford Book of London (ed., 1995)
- First Love (ed., 1997)
- Kitty and Virgil (1998)
- The Stately Homo: A Celebration of the Life of Quentin Crisp (ed., 2000)
- Three Queer Lives: An Alternative Biography of Naomi Jacob, Fred Barnes and Arthur Marshall (2001)
- Uncle Rudolf (2002)
- A Dog's Life (2003)
- Chapman's Odyssey (2011)
- The Prince's Boy (2014)
- Joie de Vivre (2022)
