= Geoff Hoon =

British Labour politician (born 1953)

The Right Honourable Geoff Hoon
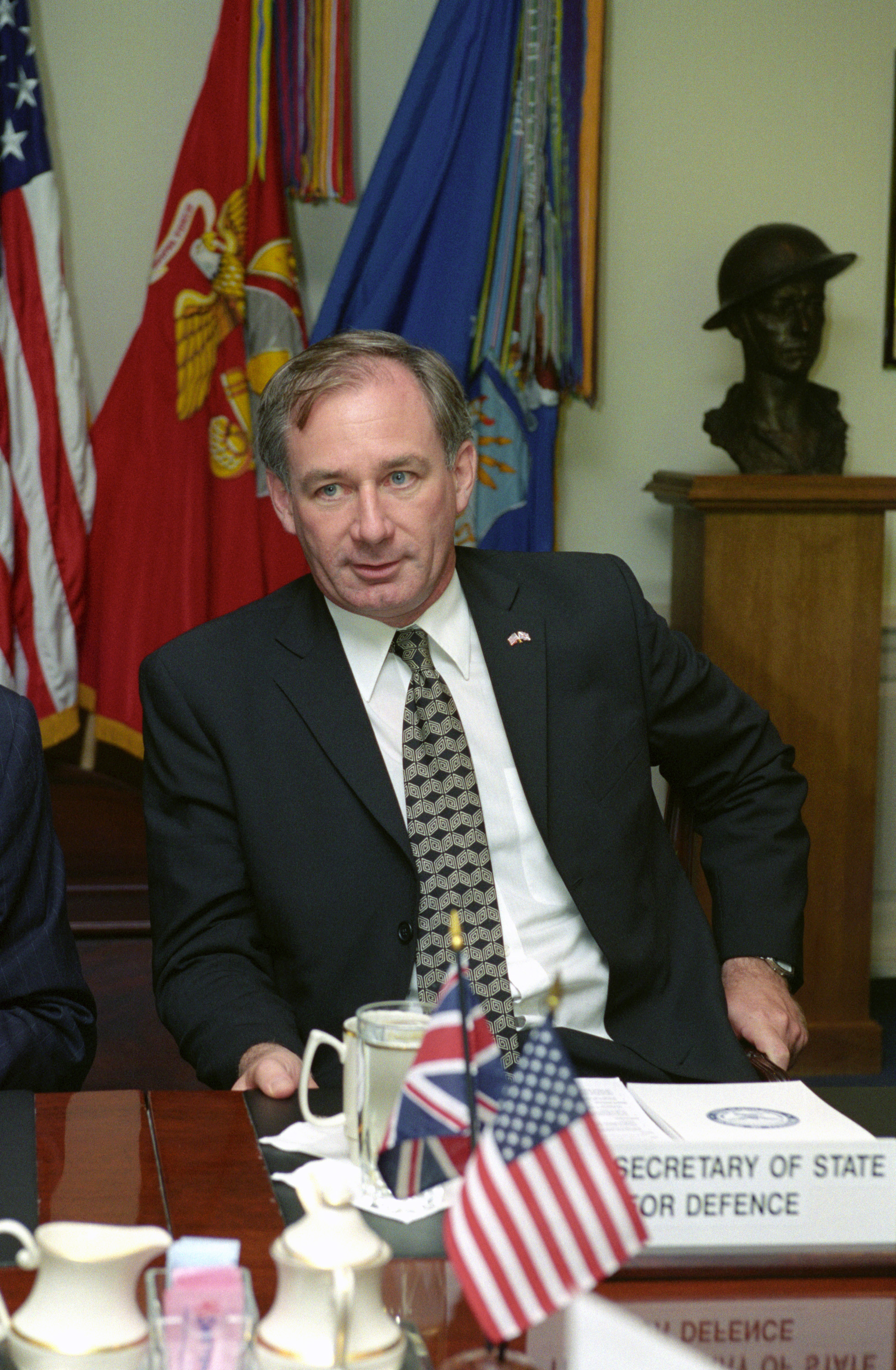
- Hoon in 2002

Secretary of State for Transport
- In office 3 October 2008 – 5 June 2009
- Prime Minister: Gordon Brown
- Preceded by: Ruth Kelly
- Succeeded by: The Lord Adonis

Chief Whip Parliamentary Secretary to the Treasury
- In office 28 June 2007 – 3 October 2008
- Prime Minister: Gordon Brown
- Deputy: Nick Brown
- Preceded by: Jacqui Smith
- Succeeded by: Nick Brown

Minister of State for Europe
- In office 5 May 2006 – 28 June 2007
- Prime Minister: Tony Blair
- Preceded by: Douglas Alexander
- Succeeded by: Jim Murphy
- In office 28 July 1999 – 11 October 1999
- Prime Minister: Tony Blair
- Preceded by: Joyce Quin
- Succeeded by: Keith Vaz

Leader of the House of Commons Lord Keeper of the Privy Seal
- In office 6 May 2005 – 5 May 2006
- Prime Minister: Tony Blair
- Deputy: Phil Woolas; Nigel Griffiths
- Preceded by: Peter Hain
- Succeeded by: Jack Straw

Secretary of State for Defence
- In office 11 October 1999 – 6 May 2005
- Prime Minister: Tony Blair
- Preceded by: George Robertson
- Succeeded by: John Reid

Minister of State for Asia, the Pacific, Middle East and North Africa
- In office 9 May 1999 – 28 July 1999
- Prime Minister: Tony Blair
- Preceded by: Derek Fatchett
- Succeeded by: Peter Hain

Minister of State for the Lord Chancellor's Department (Note: Parliamentary Under-Secretary of State until July 1998)
- In office 6 May 1997 – 9 May 1999
- Prime Minister: Tony Blair
- Preceded by: Office established
- Succeeded by: Keith Vaz (Note: as Parliamentary Under-Secretary of State)

Member of Parliament for Ashfield
- In office 9 April 1992 – 12 April 2010
- Preceded by: Frank Haynes
- Succeeded by: Gloria De Piero

Personal details
- Born: Geoffrey William Hoon; 6 December 1953 (age 72) Derby, England
- Party: Labour
- Spouse: Elaine Dumelow
- Children: 3
- Education: Jesus College, Cambridge

Geoffrey William Hoon (born 6 December 1953) is a British former politician who served as the Member of Parliament (MP) for Ashfield in Nottinghamshire from 1992 to 2010 for the Labour Party. He is a former Defence Secretary, Transport Secretary, Leader of the House of Commons and Government Chief Whip.

He had previously been a Member of the European Parliament (MEP) for Derbyshire from 1984 to 1994.

== Early life ==
His mother June attended the Homelands School in Derby, in the 1940s, and his father attended the Central School for Boys, in Derby. His father lived on Howard Street in Derby, in the 1940s.

Hoon was born in Derby, England, and is the son of railwayman Ernest Hoon and June Collett. His parents were Methodists, and he attended the New Sawley Methodist church.

He was privately educated at Nottingham High School, an independent school. He gained seven O levels in 1970. He competed in the 400m hurdles, running 65.2 seconds, at school. In November 1971 he was awarded the Duke of Edinburgh Gold Award. In August 1972 he received grade B in English, grade A in History, and grade A in Economics. He worked in a local furniture factory before going to university. He then read law at Jesus College, Cambridge, from which he graduated in 1976. He was a lecturer in the Faculty of Law at the University of Leeds from 1976 to 1982 and was a sub-warden at Devonshire Hall. He was called to the bar at Gray's Inn in 1978, and was also a visiting Law Professor at the University of Louisville, Kentucky, from 1979 to 1980. In 1982, Hoon became a practising barrister in Nottingham.

== Member of the European Parliament ==
At a Labour party meeting in Matlock on Saturday 10 December 1983, he was chosen as the Labour candidate for the 1984 European Parliament elections. He had previously not been in favour of the EEC and had campaigned against it in the 1975 referendum. In 1983, he thought that EEC spending was put in the wrong places, and he wanted a change to the EEC's common agricultural policy, where he felt that much food went to waste and that it resulted in some products in the supermarket costing too much.

Hoon was elected as a Member of the European Parliament (MEP) for the Derbyshire (European Parliament constituency) in 1984, defeating the Conservative incumbent Tom Spencer, and served in Brussels and Strasbourg for ten years. In 1988, he drafted a report for the European Parliament's Committee on Legal Affairs in favour of prohibiting dual membership of the European Parliament and national parliaments, subsequently approved by the Parliament and enacted as of the 2004 European elections. Ironically, Hoon himself became a dual-mandate member for two years, after being elected to the House of Commons in 1992 and only standing down from the European Parliament at the 1994 elections.

== Member of Parliament ==
Hoon was elected to the House of Commons at the 1992 general election for Ashfield, making his maiden speech on 20 May 1992, following the retirement of the sitting Labour MP, Frank Haynes. He held the seat with a majority of 12,987 and remained as the MP until the 2010 general election.

Towards the end of his political career, Hoon acquired the irreverent nickname Buff (Buffoon) as the result of a joke told by fellow Labour Party colleague Peter Kilfoyle.

== Shadow Cabinet and early government posts ==
In Parliament, Hoon was promoted by Tony Blair in 1994 when he was appointed as an opposition whip, and in 1995 he joined the frontbench team as a spokesman on Trade and Industry. Following the 1997 general election he became a member of the government of Tony Blair as the Parliamentary under-secretary of state at the Lord Chancellor's Department, being promoted to the rank of Minister of State in the same department in 1998.

In 1999, Hoon was briefly a minister at the Foreign and Commonwealth Office with responsibility for Asia, the Pacific, Middle East and North Africa. He entered the cabinet later in the year as the Secretary of State for Defence, at which time he became a member of the Privy Council. He served as the Lord Privy Seal and the Leader of the House of Commons from the 2005 general election until 5 May 2006, when he was appointed as Minister for Europe.

== Secretary of State for Defence ==
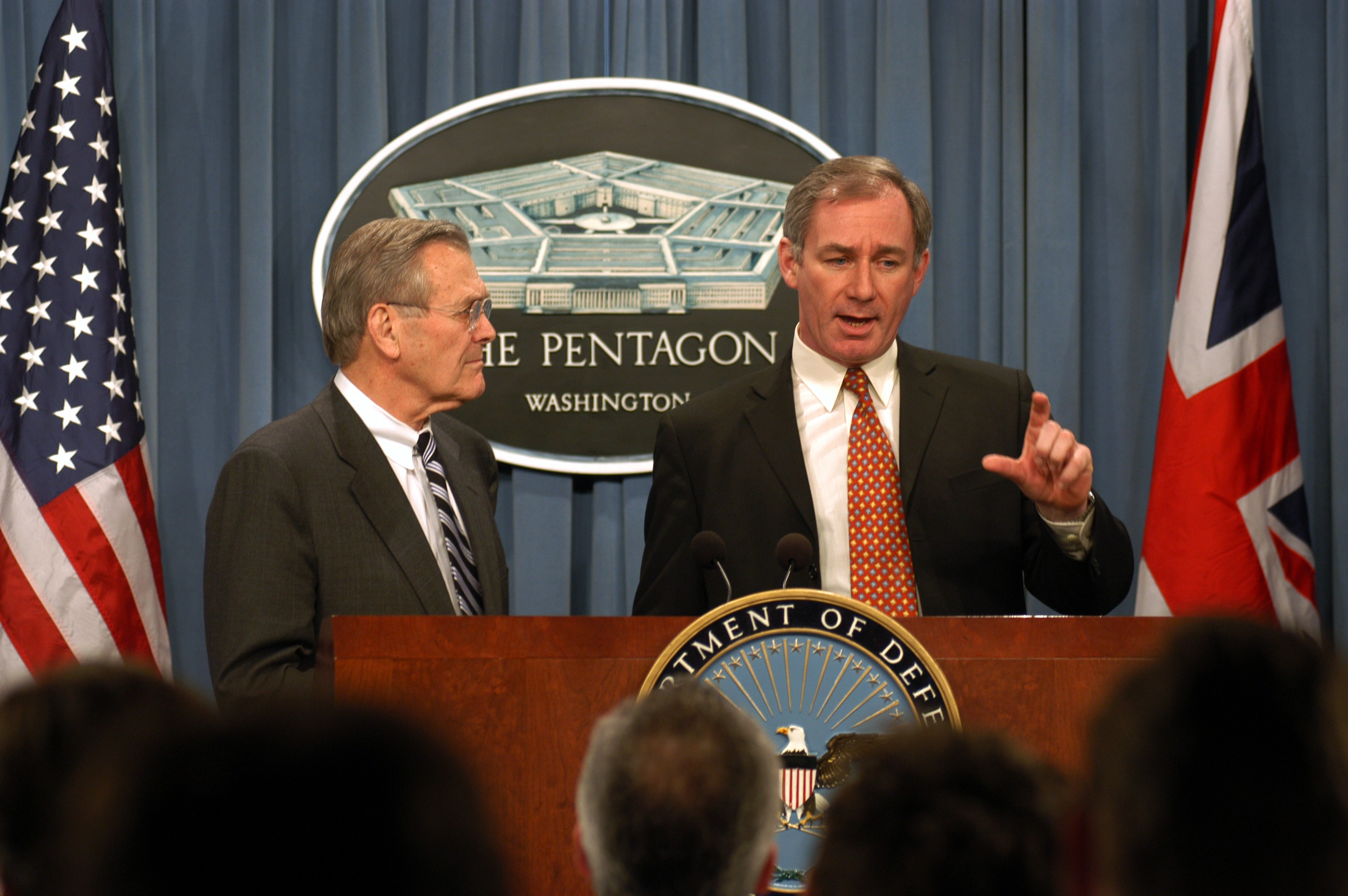
Geoff Hoon (right) at Pentagon briefing with Donald Rumsfeld

On 11 October 1999 Hoon was appointed Secretary of State for Defence. His term took him through the 2000 British military intervention in the Sierra Leone Civil War and the NATO intervention in the 2001 insurgency in the Republic of Macedonia. The rest of his term was dominated by the start of the war on terror in 2001, including British participation in both the War in Afghanistan, Operation Herrick, and the 2003 invasion of Iraq, Operation Telic.

Asserting the importance of deterrence, in a 2003 interview on the BBC's Breakfast with Frost, Hoon asserted that the UK was willing to use nuclear weapons against Iraqi forces "in the right circumstances, namely in extreme self defence."

On 23 June 2003, Hoon, following a detailed briefing given to the United Nations by US Secretary of State, Colin Powell, continued to claim that two trailers found in Iraq were mobile weapons laboratories. This was in spite of the fact that it had been leaked to the press by David Kelly and other weapons inspectors that they were nothing of the sort. The trailers were for filling hydrogen balloons for artillery ranging and were sold to Iraq by a British company, Marconi.

In an April 2004 interview, Hoon said that more could have been done to help Kelly, who committed suicide on 17 July 2003 after being named as the source of Andrew Gilligan's disputed Today programme contribution.

Hoon gave evidence about the Iraq war both to the 2003 Hutton Inquiry during his term, and later on 19 January 2010 gave evidence to the Iraq Inquiry about his time as Defence Secretary.

=== Comments on cluster bombs ===
Shortly after the US/UK led invasion of Iraq began in 2003, following an admission by the Ministry of Defence that Britain had dropped 50 airborne cluster bombs in the south of Iraq and left behind up to 800 unexploded bomblets, it was put to Hoon in a Radio 4 interview that an Iraqi mother of a child killed by these cluster bombs would not thank the British Army. He replied "One day they might." Hoon continued, "I accept that in the short term the consequences are terrible. No one minimises those and I'm not seeking to do so," he said. "But what I am saying is that this is a country that has been brutalised for decades by this appalling regime and that the restoration of that country to its own people, the possibility of their deciding for themselves their future ... and indeed the way in which they go about their lives, ultimately, yes, that will be a better place for people in Iraq."

=== HMCS Chicoutimi comments ===
In 1998, Canada purchased four Upholder-class submarines and a suite of trainers from the Royal Navy to replace their decommissioned Oberon-class submarines. The Upholder class entered Royal Navy service from 1990 to 1993 at the end of the Cold War, and were deemed surplus as part of the Peace Dividend and refocus on a nuclear submarine fleet. They were placed into storage until Canada purchased them.

On 5 October 2004 HMCS Chicoutimi, sailing from Faslane Naval Base to Nova Scotia, declared an emergency northwest of Ireland following a fire on board. The fire was caused by seawater entering through open hatches in rough seas; an inquiry established later that this was an "incorrect operating procedure". It soaked electrical insulation (which had not been sufficiently waterproofed since it conformed to an older specification than the three other submarines), starting a fire. The Chicoutimi lost power and wallowed in the seas NW of Ireland. An Irish Naval vessel was damaged by the heavy seas when trying to get to the Chicoutimi but another the LÉ Aoife was able to reach her and took over from British Royal Navy frigates HMS Montrose and Marlborough as the scene coordinator on the 6th of October. Three crewmen were airlifted to Sligo General Hospital in Ireland where Lt(N) Chris Saunders died subsequently from the effects of smoke inhalation.

Following claims made in the Canadian media about the cause of the fire, blaming the UK for supplying an unsafe vessel, Hoon accompanied his condolences for Saunders by stating that Canada would be charged for the rescue and stating that Canada as the buyer had to beware. In Canada, many World War II veterans were outraged by his comments, considering Canada's sacrifice for Britain during both World Wars.

=== Comments on extraordinary rendition ===
Hoon was criticised by an international delegation of European MPs for evading questions about Britain's co-operation with the CIA's so-called 'extraordinary rendition' programme, even though he knew nothing about the programme. Hoon, then Minister for Europe, was being quizzed in the wake of Dick Marty's Council of Europe report which found extensive involvement of European countries, including Britain, in the US kidnapping and torture programme.

== Secretary of State for Transport ==
In the reshuffle after the sudden resignation of the Secretary of State for Transport, Ruth Kelly, during the 2008 Labour Party Conference, Hoon became the Secretary of State for Transport on 3 October 2008. His former role as Labour Chief Whip was given to Nick Brown.

In January 2009, Hoon gave the official go-ahead for the controversial expansion of Heathrow Airport. Later that same year, Transport Secretary Hoon oversaw the launch of the vehicle scrappage scheme; which was intended to encourage motorists to scrap their older, more polluting vehicles for a discount off a more modern, more environmentally friendly newer car from participating companies.

== Backbench MP ==
Hoon resigned from his post as Transport Secretary on 5 June 2009 during a Cabinet reshuffle, saying that he wanted to spend more time with his family. On 6 January 2010, he and fellow ex-minister Patricia Hewitt jointly called for a secret ballot on the future of the leadership of Gordon Brown. The following day, he said that it appeared to have failed and was "over". Brown later referred to the call for a secret ballot as a "form of silliness". After the failed coup there was a backlash against Hoon which flowed over into his Ashfield constituency in Nottinghamshire where some Labour party members wanted to deselect him.

During the Iraq Inquiry, Hoon said that the first he knew of the 45-minute Iraq weapon claim was when he read it in the dossier on Iraq's weapons in September 2002.

Hoon had said that he would defend his seat at the 2010 general election, however in February 2010, he announced that he would not seek re-election at the next election.

== Expense claims ==
In April 2009, it emerged that Hoon had rented out his London home and claimed expenses on his constituency house, as approved by the Fees Office of the House of Commons. For security reasons he was required to live in state-owned accommodation at Admiralty House. Whilst this was rent free it involved significant costs. He made clear that he had only claimed what he was entitled to under the rules of the House of Commons.

== Dispatches lobbyist investigation ==
Hoon was one of the MPs named in the 2010 sting operation on political lobbying by the Channel 4 Dispatches programme. Hoon told an undercover reporter that he wanted to translate his knowledge and contacts into something that "frankly makes money". On 22 March 2010 it was announced he had been suspended from the Parliamentary Labour Party, alongside Patricia Hewitt and Stephen Byers.

On 9 December 2010 Hoon, along with Stephen Byers and Richard Caborn, was banned from having an ex-members pass. The Standards and Privileges Committee banned Hoon for a minimum five years as his was the most serious breach, whilst Byers received two years and Caborn six months.

== Career after politics ==
After his retirement from politics he helped to set up a consultancy firm "TaylorHoon Strategy". He was managing director for international business for helicopter manufacturer AgustaWestland from 2011 to 2017.

A 2018 report by Corruption Watch UK showed emails from Hoon asking a former South Korean minister to "actively engage in exerting influence over high-ranking decision-makers" in the country. Government lobbying is illegal in South Korea and Hoon denies that he expected the former minister to lobby on behalf of AgustaWestland.

Hoon has been chairman of Twycross Zoo since 2017.

== Personal life ==
Hoon is married and has a son (born 1985) and a daughter (born 1990).

Parliament of the United Kingdom
Preceded by Frank Haynes	Member of Parliament for Ashfield; 1992–2010	Succeeded by Gloria De Piero
Political offices
Preceded by Joyce Quin	Minister for Europe; 1999	Succeeded by Keith Vaz
Preceded by George Robertson	Secretary of State for Defence; 1999–2005	Succeeded by John Reid
Preceded by Peter Hain	Leader of the House of Commons; 2005–2006	Succeeded by Jack Straw
Preceded by Peter Hain	Lord Privy Seal; 2005–2006	Succeeded by Jack Straw
Preceded by Douglas Alexander	Minister for Europe; 2006–2007	Succeeded by Jim Murphy
Preceded by Jacqui Smith	Chief Whip of the Labour Party; 2007–2008	Succeeded by Nick Brown
Preceded by Jacqui Smith	Parliamentary Secretary to the Treasury; 2007–2008	Succeeded by Nick Brown
Preceded by Ruth Kelly	Secretary of State for Transport; 2008–2009	Succeeded by The Lord Adonis
