= Dominic Grieve =

English barrister and politician (born 1956)

The Right Honourable Dominic Grieve KC PC
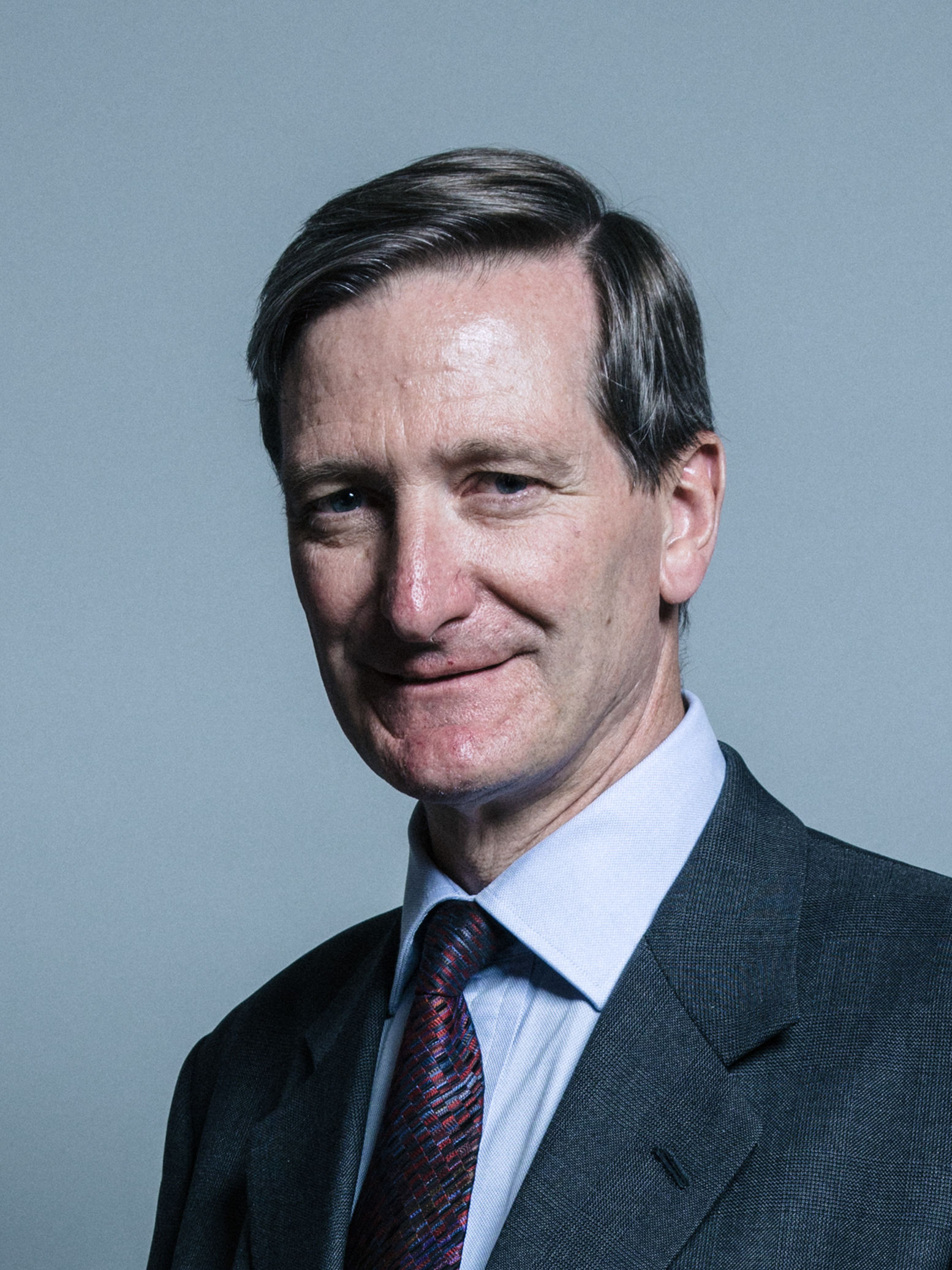
- Official portrait, 2017

Chair of the Intelligence and Security Committee
- In office 15 September 2015 – 6 November 2019
- Preceded by: Sir Malcolm Rifkind
- Succeeded by: Julian Lewis

Attorney General for England and Wales Advocate General for Northern Ireland
- In office 12 May 2010 – 15 July 2014
- Prime Minister: David Cameron
- Preceded by: The Baroness Scotland of Asthal
- Succeeded by: Jeremy Wright
Shadow Cabinet positions
Shadow Secretary of State for Justice
In office 19 January 2009 – 11 May 2010
Leader	David Cameron
Preceded by	Nick Herbert
Succeeded by	Jack Straw
Shadow Home Secretary
In office 12 June 2008 – 19 January 2009
Leader	David Cameron
Preceded by	David Davis
Succeeded by	Chris Grayling
Shadow Attorney General for England and Wales
In office 6 November 2003 – 7 September 2009
Leader	Michael Howard; David Cameron
Preceded by	Bill Cash
Succeeded by	Edward Garnier

Member of Parliament for Beaconsfield
- In office 1 May 1997 – 6 November 2019
- Preceded by: Tim Smith
- Succeeded by: Joy Morrissey

Personal details
- Born: 24 May 1956 (age 70) Lambeth, London, England
- Party: Independent (2019–)
- Other political affiliations: Conservative (until 2019)
- Spouse: Caroline Hutton (m. 1990)
- Children: 2
- Education: Magdalen College, Oxford; University of Westminster
- Website: tgchambers.com/profile/dominic-grieve-kc/

Dominic Charles Roberts Grieve (born 24 May 1956) is an English barrister and former politician who served as Shadow Home Secretary from 2008 to 2009 and Attorney General for England and Wales from 2010 to 2014. He served as the Member of Parliament (MP) for Beaconsfield from 1997 to 2019 and was the Chair of the Intelligence and Security Committee from 2015 to 2019.

Grieve attended the Cabinet as Attorney General for England and Wales and Advocate General for Northern Ireland from May 2010 to July 2014. He was dismissed as Attorney General by Prime Minister David Cameron as part of the 2014 Cabinet reshuffle, and was replaced by Jeremy Wright. Elected as a Conservative, Grieve had the Conservative whip removed in the September 2019 suspension of rebel Conservative MPs. He unsuccessfully stood as an independent candidate in Beaconsfield at the 2019 general election.

A liberal conservative, Grieve was a central figure on Brexit and frequently used his experience as a lawyer to propose amendments on the issue, with his interventions often being at odds with government policy. A prominent Remain supporter on Brexit, Grieve called for a second referendum on EU membership, and before being expelled had said that he and other Conservative rebels would support a vote of no confidence to bring down a Conservative government, if that were the only way to block the "catastrophic" damage from a bad Brexit. In spring 2019, Grieve was threatened with deselection by his local party after losing a confidence vote by members. In October 2019, following removal of the whip, Grieve announced that he would stand as an independent candidate in his constituency's seat at the next general election. It was announced that the Liberal Democrats would stand aside to help him, but to no avail, as he lost his seat.

Grieve is the president of the Franco-British Society. He was awarded the Legion of Honour in 2016, and broadcasts in French on French radio and television. He is a practising Anglican and was a member of the London diocesan synod of the Church of England. Grieve is also a member of the Garrick Club.

== Early life ==
Grieve was born in Lambeth, London, the son of Percy Grieve, QC (the MP for Solihull 1964–83), and of an Anglo-French mother, Evelyn Raymonde Louise Mijouain (d. 1991), maternal granddaughter of Sir George Roberts, 1st and last baronet. He was educated at the Lycée français Charles de Gaulle on Cromwell Road in South Kensington, Colet Court (an all-boys' preparatory school in Barnes) and Westminster School. He went to Magdalen College, Oxford, where he received a Bachelor of Arts degree in modern history in 1978. He was the President of the Oxford University Conservative Association in 1977.

Grieve continued his studies at the Polytechnic of Central London (now the University of Westminster), where he received a Diploma in Law in 1979.

== Legal career ==
He was called to the Bar at the Middle Temple in 1980 and is a specialist in occupational safety and health law.

== Political career ==
=== Local council ===
He was elected as a councillor in the London Borough of Hammersmith and Fulham for the Avonmore ward in 1982, but did not stand for re-election in 1986. He contested the Norwood constituency in the London Borough of Lambeth at the 1987 general election but finished in second place behind the veteran Labour MP John Fraser.

=== Member of Parliament ===
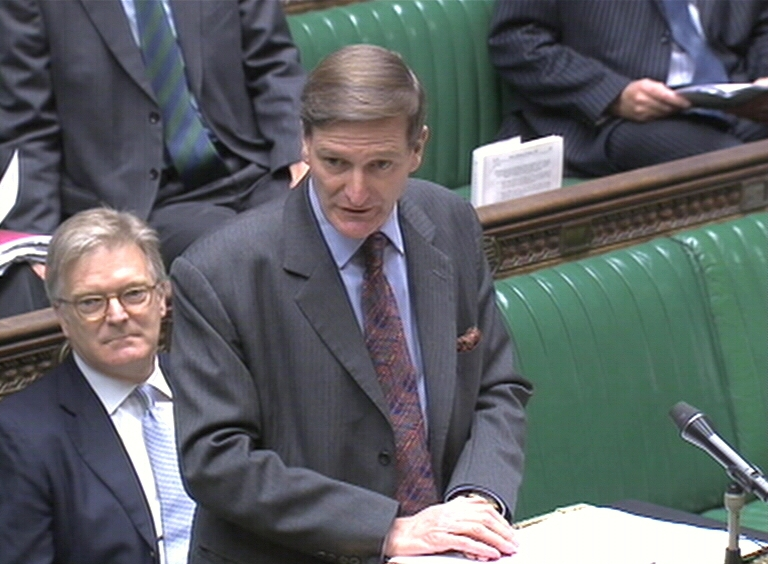
Grieve speaking in the House of Commons

He was elected to the House of Commons for the Buckinghamshire seat of Beaconsfield at the 1997 general election following the resignation of Tim Smith in the cash-for-questions affair. Grieve was elected with a majority of 13,987 votes and remained the MP there until his defeat in the 2019 general election.

He made his maiden speech on 21 May 1997.

He was a member of both the Environmental Audit and the Statutory Instruments select committees from 1997 to 1999. In 1999, he was promoted to the frontbench by William Hague as a spokesman on Scottish affairs, moving to speak on home affairs as the spokesman on criminal justice following the election of Iain Duncan Smith as the new leader of the Conservative Party in 2001, and was then promoted to be shadow Attorney General by Michael Howard in 2003. Grieve also had responsibility for community cohesion on behalf of the Conservative Party. He voted for the Iraq War in 2003.

He was retained as Shadow Attorney General by the new Conservative Leader David Cameron, and was appointed Shadow Home Secretary on 12 June 2008, following the resignation of David Davis.

In early 2006, Grieve was instrumental in the defeat of the Labour government on its proposal that the Home Secretary should have power to detain suspected terrorists for periods up to 90 days without charge.

In the last Conservative Shadow Cabinet reshuffle before the general election of 2010, carried out on 19 January 2009, Grieve was moved to become Shadow Justice Secretary, opposite Jack Straw. According to the BBC, Grieve was said to be "very happy with the move" which would suit his talents better.

On 28 May 2010, he was appointed to the Privy Council as part of the 2010 Dissolution of Parliament Honours List.

Following the 2010 general election, Grieve was appointed as Attorney General. He was one of four members of the cabinet who abstained in the May 2013 same-sex marriage vote. He said that he believed that the Bill had been "badly conceived".

On 22 November 2013, Grieve was reported as stating politicians need to "wake up" to the issue of corruption in some minority communities and that "corruption in parts of the Pakistani community is 'endemic'". Two days later he apologised and said he had not meant to suggest there was a "particular problem in the Pakistani community".

Grieve was sacked from the cabinet by David Cameron in July 2014 and replaced by Jeremy Wright. Grieve believed this was because of his support for the European Court of Human Rights, although no reason was given; the sacking also occurred a few weeks after Grieve gave Cameron incorrect legal advice on whether he could make a public comment on the Andy Coulson trial.

Grieve volunteered at the Sufra food bank in January 2015 to highlight issues relating to the increased use of food banks. In October 2016, speaking at a fringe meeting of the Conservative party's annual conference, Grieve warned that electoral fraud is found "where there are high levels of inhabitants from a community in which there is a tradition of electoral corruption in their home countries." Although in the past he apologised for singling out the British Pakistani community, Grieve said it was not about any one group.

In July 2019, following the appointment of Boris Johnson as Prime Minister, Grieve described Johnson as a "charlatan".

==== Removal of Conservative whip ====
On 3 September 2019, Grieve joined 20 other rebel Conservative MPs to vote against the Conservative government of Boris Johnson. The rebel MPs voted with the Opposition against a Conservative motion which subsequently failed; the successful vote allowed a debate on a Bill which would block a no-deal Brexit. Subsequently, all 21 were advised that they had lost the Conservative "whip", expelling them as Conservative MPs, requiring them to sit as independents. If they decided to run for re-election in a future election, the Party would block their selection as Conservative candidates. In October 2019, Grieve announced that he was planning to stand again in his seat as an independent. The Liberal Democrats decided not to contest the Beaconsfield constituency (giving Grieve an increased chance at defeating the Conservative candidate Joy Morrissey). The deal was described at the time as "the first significant move towards the formation of a 'remain alliance' at the general election". He polled 16,765 votes (29%) losing the seat to Morrisey who polled 32,477 votes (56%), a majority of 15,712 on a 75% electoral turnout.

==== Brexit ====
Grieve was opposed to Brexit before the 2016 referendum.

In May 2017, prior to the general election and in support of the Conservative manifesto, Grieve stated on his website that "the decision of the electorate in the Referendum must be respected and that I should support a reasoned process to give effect to it".

During the Brexit negotiation process, Grieve made a number of amendments against the Government's plans to leave the EU. The first was to give Parliament a "meaningful vote" over the Brexit agreement – i.e. to force a motion by Parliament to approve the Brexit agreement which would have a binding effect on the government. In December 2017, he tabled an amendment (Amendment 7) to the European Union (Withdrawal) Bill requiring any Brexit deal to be enacted by statute, rather than implemented by government order. The amendment was opposed by the government, but was passed in Parliament. Another proposed amendment tabled on 12 June 2018 (Amendment 19), and again on 20 June, was designed to strengthen the binding effect of the meaningful vote, by requiring that the government follow the directions of a Parliamentary motion in the event that Parliament does not approve the withdrawal agreement put by the government. Grieve threatened to rebel but ultimately voted with the government against the amendment after verbal assurances from Prime Minister Theresa May, presented as a compromise; the outcome was summarised by The Guardian as "Technically, MPs can still have a vote on the final deal – or no deal – but unless it is a vote of confidence, the government can ignore it." Grieve's 3rd amendment in December 2018 would mean Parliament would replace the Government in deciding the outcome of Brexit following a vote against the Government's proposed deal with the EU.

On 24 July 2018, Grieve wrote a column for The Independent backing the online paper's final say petition, which calls for the British electorate to have a "final say on the Brexit deal". The petition was also backed by the leader of the People's Vote campaign, MP Chuka Umunna. Grieve stated that Brexit puts the Conservative Party's reputation for "economic competence" at risk.

Grieve wrote that Theresa May risked a "polite rebellion" from pro-EU MPs and a "significant" number would support another referendum if there was no deal. This followed a claim that Tory rebels are prepared to "collapse the government" to block a "catastrophic" Brexit deal.

Grieve was one of the signatories of a December 2018 statement by a group of senior Conservatives calling for a second referendum over Brexit. On 11 January 2019, during his speech to the convention for a second referendum, Grieve described Brexit as "national suicide". Shortly afterwards, he co-founded the group Right to Vote. He also declared that he would resign the whip if the Conservative Party elected Boris Johnson as a successor to Theresa May or if the government took Britain out of the EU without a deal.

On 9 January 2019, Grieve made a successful amendment to a government business motion; the amendment was controversial due to the unusual circumstances in which it was permitted by Speaker John Bercow. "Conservatives are furious that Mr Bercow accepted the Grieve amendment, as parliamentary rules usually only allow a government minister to amend motions of this kind." "The new Grieve amendment, now passed by MPs, means that in the event the PM loses next week, the Commons will then have a chance to vote on alternative policies – everything from a "managed no-deal" to a further referendum, via a "Norway option" or a reheated version of the current deal, could be on the table... MPs claim Mr Bercow broke Commons rules and ignored the advice of his own clerks."

Ultimately May's withdrawal deal was rejected and on 29 January 2019, Grieve's resulting amendment was defeated by the Government, supported by Labour rebels. The amendment would have "Forced the government to make time for MPs to discuss a range of alternatives to the prime minister's Brexit plan on six full days in the Commons before 26 March.... which could have included alternative Brexit options such as Labour's plan, a second referendum, no deal and the Norway-style relationship".

On 29 March 2019 (the original planned date of Brexit), a motion of no confidence against Grieve was carried by his local party 182 votes to 131. At this, Grieve said he'll carry on 'exactly as before'. The motion triggers the first stage in the process of deselection. Grieve accused ex-UKIP opponent, Jon Conway, of 'insurgency', claiming Conway was behind the motion; a claim that Conway denied. Grieve has since been asked to apply for readoption by his local party.

Grieve's proposal to block Government funding in order to enable MPs to have a vote on a No Deal Brexit was condemned by the Prime Minister Theresa May. Referencing Grieve's attempt to halt Government spending on pensions and schools, May stated "Any attempt to deny vital funding to Whitehall departments would be grossly irresponsible"; the pro-Brexit Telegraph newspaper condemned the actions as it "risks taking our politics to new extreme". The attempt was, in any case, blocked by the Speaker of the House of Commons, John Bercow, and did not proceed to a vote.

Grieve has been credited as a contributor to a Labour Party motion designed to prevent a no-deal Brexit, the plans were kept secret until their unveiling on 11 June 2019, when Conservative leadership candidates began their campaigns. If successful, it would have seen MPs taking over the Westminster timetable on 25 June 2019 with a view to enshrining legislation which would prevent the UK from leaving the EU without a deal. The motion was defeated by 309 votes to 298 the following day. Grieve said the motion was the "last sensible opportunity" to stop a no-deal Brexit. He added that in the future, if necessary, he would support efforts to bring down a Conservative government in a vote of no confidence if it was the only way to block such an outcome.

Later in June 2019, Grieve successfully proposed amendments which sought to thwart no-deal Brexit prorogation. Grieve's first amendment to the 2019 Northern Ireland bill, which was initially a simple one intended to delay elections and budgets for the long-suspended Northern Ireland assembly and executive, required a minister to report to the Commons every two weeks until December on the progress of talks on restoring the Northern Ireland assembly – though it remained unclear whether this could be done as a written report, meaning the chamber would not necessarily have to sit. This was later changed via another amendment in the Lords, tabled by David Anderson, with support from Labour and the Liberal Democrats. This said the fortnightly reports demanded by Grieve's amendments would have to be debated within five calendar days of being produced, thus necessitating that the Commons sits. When the bill returned to the Commons Grieve then added another tweak via a last-minute amendment, intending to increase the power to block prorogation even more. It specified that if ministers could not meet the obligation to update the Commons because it was prorogued or adjourned, parliament would have to meet on the day necessary to comply with the obligation and for the following five weekdays.

== Personal life ==
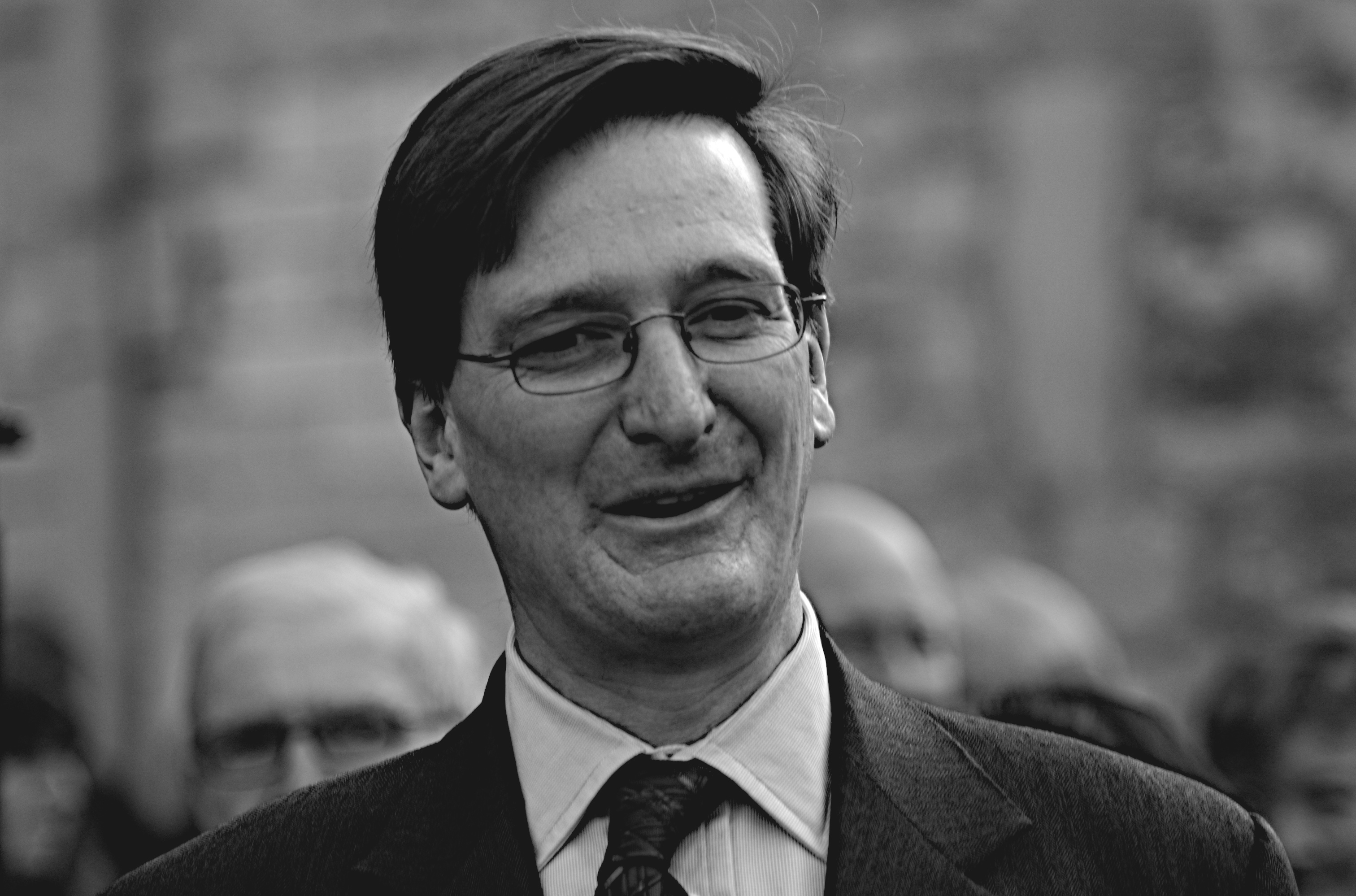
Grieve in 2007

He is a practising Anglican and was a member of the London diocesan synod of the Church of England for six years from 1994. He married barrister Caroline Hutton in October 1990 in the City of London. They have two sons.

He lists his hobbies as "canoeing, boating on the Thames at weekends, mountain climbing, skiing and fell walking, architecture, art and travel". He was a police station lay visitor for six years from 1990, and worked in Brixton on various bodies set up to reconcile the different communities after the riots.

Grieve is a Patron of Prisoners Abroad, a charity that supports the welfare of Britons imprisoned overseas and their families.

In 2009, Grieve's wealth was estimated at £3.1 million. Grieve was criticised in 2008 for investments in multinational companies with significant projects in Zimbabwe.

== Honours and awards ==
=== Commonwealth Honours ===
Country	Date	Appointment	Post-nominal letters	Honorific
United Kingdom	9 June 2010	Member of His Majesty's Most Honourable Privy Council	PC	The Right Honourable
United Kingdom	22 November 2004	Master of the Bench at Middle Temple		
United Kingdom	28 March 2008	Queen's Counsel	QC/KC	

=== Foreign Honours ===
Country	Date	Appointment	Post-nominal letters	Class
France	2016	Legion of Honour		Chevalier

== Scholastic ==
=== Chancellor, visitor, governor, rector and fellowships ===
Location	Date	School	Position
England	3 June 2020 – Present	Goldsmiths, University of London	Visiting Professor

=== Honorary degrees ===
Location	Date	School	Degree	Gave Commencement Address
England	August 2021	University of Westminster	Doctor of Letters (D.Litt.)	Yes
England	26 July 2022	Kingston University	Doctorate	Yes

Parliament of the United Kingdom
Preceded by Tim Smith	Member of Parliament for Beaconsfield; 1997–2019	Succeeded by Joy Morrissey
Political offices
Preceded by Bill Cash	Shadow Attorney General; 2003–2009	Succeeded by Edward Garnier
Preceded by David Davis	Shadow Home Secretary; 2008–2009	Succeeded by Chris Grayling
Preceded by Nick Herbert	Shadow Secretary of State for Justice; 2009–2010	Succeeded by Jack Straw
Preceded by The Baroness Scotland of Asthal	Attorney General for England and Wales; 2010–2014	Succeeded by Jeremy Wright
Preceded by The Baroness Scotland of Asthal	Advocate General for Northern Ireland; 2010–2014	Succeeded by Jeremy Wright
