= Beaconsfield (UK Parliament constituency) =

UK Parliament constituency (since 1974)

Coordinates: 51.58°N 0.64°W

- County constituency for the House of Commons
- Boundaries since 2024
- Boundary of Beaconsfield in South East England
- County: Buckinghamshire
- Population: 99,387 (2011 census)
- Electorate: 72,315 (2023)
- Major settlements: Beaconsfield, Marlow, Bourne End, Burnham

Current constituency
- Created: 1974
- Member of Parliament: Joy Morrissey (Conservative)
- Created from: South Buckinghamshire

Beaconsfield (/ˈbɛkənzfiːld/) is a constituency (Note: A county constituency (for the purposes of election expenses and type of returning officer)) in Buckinghamshire represented in the House of Commons of the UK Parliament since 2019 by Joy Morrissey of the Conservative Party. She succeeded Independent and former Conservative Dominic Grieve, whom she defeated following his suspension from the party. The constituency was established for the February 1974 general election.

== Constituency profile ==
The Beaconsfield constituency is located in the south of Buckinghamshire. It is mostly rural and contains the towns and villages to the north of Slough, including Beaconsfield, Marlow, Burnham and Bourne End.

The area is highly affluent and its average house price is amongst the highest in the country. Residents are generally older, wealthier and more likely to work in professional jobs than national averages. The constituency is more ethnically diverse than the country as a whole; 13% of the population are Asian and 4% are Black. At the most recent county council election in 2025, voters primarily elected Conservative or independent councillors. Voters in the constituency are estimated to have been evenly split on European Union membership in the 2016 referendum.

== History ==
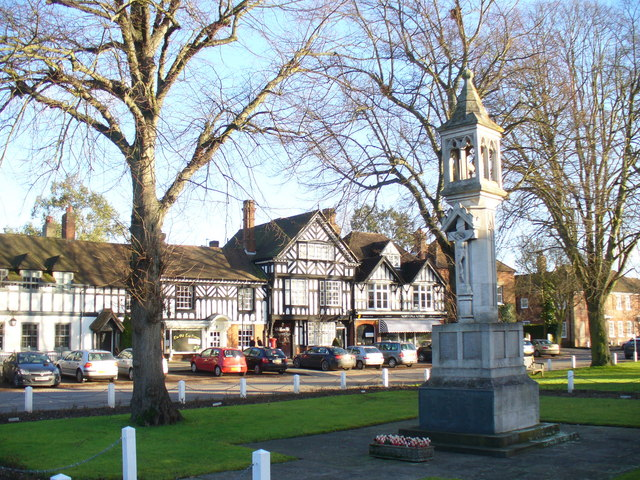
Memorial Green, the Old Town, Beaconsfield

The constituency was created in 1974, mostly from the former seat of South Buckinghamshire, since which date the area has formed the southernmost part of Buckinghamshire — before 1974 the notable settlements of Slough and Eton, as well as less well-known Langley, Wraysbury, Sunnymeads and Datchet were in the county.

This leads to the shape of the constituency, further accentuated in irregularity by the Thames meander containing Cookham, Berkshire to the west and southwest.

=== 1982 by-election candidates ===
In the 1982 Beaconsfield by-election caused by the death of Sir Ronald Bell, the third-placed candidate was Tony Blair for the Labour Party. Conservative Tim Smith was the first and only person ever to have beaten Blair in an election and won; Liberal Paul Tyler was in second place. Tyler later became an MP for North Cornwall, meaning that, most unusually, the three main-party candidates subsequently served in the House of Commons at the same time.

=== 2010 election ===
Incumbent Dominic Grieve's win in 2010, with 61.1% of the vote, was the second highest share of the vote in the general election for a Conservative candidate after William Hague in Richmond (Yorks).

=== 2016 EU referendum ===
Beaconsfield is estimated to have voted 51% remain in the 2016 referendum on the UK's membership of the EU. Although estimates of the constituency results have not been confirmed, the official UK Electoral Commission EU referendum results detail the area of South Buckinghamshire, which contains the Beaconsfield constituency, as voting to leave the EU with a percentage of 50.7%.

== Boundaries and boundary changes ==
=== 1974–1983 ===
- The Urban District of Beaconsfield;
- The Rural District of Eton; and
- The Rural District of Wycombe parishes of Hedsor and Wooburn.

The constituency was formed largely from southern parts of the abolished constituency of South Buckinghamshire (Beaconsfield and the Rural District of Eton). The parishes of Hedsor and Wooburn were transferred from Wycombe.

=== 1983–1997 ===
- The District of South Bucks; and
- The District of Wycombe wards of Bourne End-cum-Hedsor, Flackwell Heath, Loudwater, The Wooburns, and Tylers Green.

Gained areas to the east of High Wycombe (parish of Chepping Wycombe) from Wycombe. The parts of the former Rural District of Eton, including Datchet, which had been transferred from Buckinghamshire to Berkshire by the Local Government Act 1972 were included in the new constituency of East Berkshire.

=== 1997–2010 ===
- The District of South Bucks; and
- The District of Wycombe wards of Bourne End-cum-Hedsor, Flackwell Heath, Little Marlow, Loudwater, The Wooburns, Tylers Green.

Minor change (transfer of Little Marlow from Wycombe).

=== 2010–2024 ===
Map of boundaries 2010–2024
- The District of South Bucks; and
- The District of Wycombe wards of Bourne End-cum-Hedsor, Flackwell Heath and Little Marlow, Marlow North and West, Marlow South East, The Wooburns.

Marlow transferred from Wycombe.

In April 2020, the Districts of South Bucks and Wycombe, together with those of Aylesbury and Chiltern were merged into the new unitary authority of Buckinghamshire Council. Accordingly, the current contents of the constituency became:

- The Buckinghamshire Council wards of Beaconsfield, Cliveden, Denham, Farnham Common & Burnham Beeches, Flackwell Heath, Little Marlow & Marlow South East, Gerrards Cross, Iver, Marlow, Stoke Poges & Wexham, and The Wooburns, Bourne End & Hedsor.

The seat then consisted of Beaconsfield, most of Burnham (including Burnham Beeches forest), Denham, Dorney, Farnham Common, Farnham Royal, Fulmer, Hedgerley, Iver, Stoke Poges, Taplow and Wexham (excluding Wexham Court); (Note: These are all civil parishes in the South Bucks district) Hedsor, Little Marlow, Marlow, Wooburn and Bourne End and the Flackwell Heath settlement of Chepping Wycombe. (Note: These are all civil parishes in the Wycombe (district))

=== 2024–present ===
Further to the 2023 periodic review of Westminster constituencies which became effective for the 2024 general election, the constituency is composed of the following (as they existed on 1 December 2020):

- The District of Buckinghamshire wards of: Beaconsfield; Cliveden; Denham (polling districts SJ, SJA, SJHD, SK, SKA and SWF); Farnham Common and Burnham Beeches; Flackwell Heath, Little Marlow and Marlow South East; Gerrards Cross (polling districts SB and SFH); Iver; Marlow; Stoke Poges and Wexham; Wooburns, Bourne End and Hedsor.

The electorate was reduced to bring it within the permitted range by transferring the town of Gerrards Cross to Chesham and Amersham.

== Members of Parliament ==
South Buckinghamshire prior to 1974

Election	Member	Party
February 1974	Ronald Bell	Conservative
1982 by-election	Tim Smith	Conservative
1997	Dominic Grieve	Conservative
September 2019	Dominic Grieve	Independent
2019	Joy Morrissey	Conservative

== Elections ==
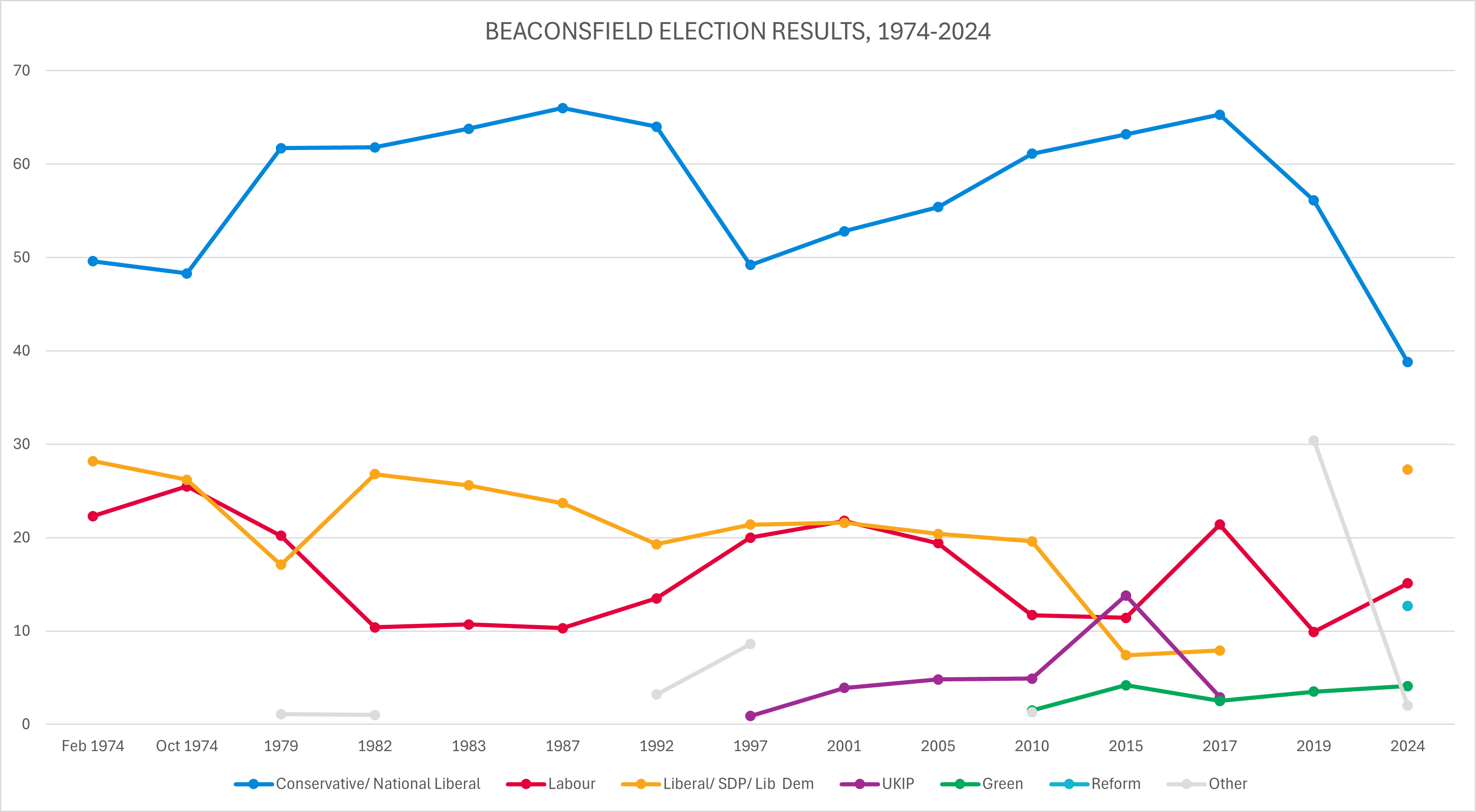
Election results 1974–2024

=== Elections in the 2020s ===
General election 2024: Beaconsfield
Party	Candidate	Votes	%	±%
Conservative	Joy Morrissey	18,494	38.8	−16.7
Liberal Democrats	Anna Crabtree	13,039	27.3	New
Labour	Matthew Patterson	7,216	15.1	+5.2
Reform	John Halsall	6,055	12.7	New
Green	Dominick Pegram	1,977	4.1	+0.4
Independent	Pippa Allen	710	1.5	New
SDP	Catherine Harker	131	0.3	New
Independent	Cole Caesar	104	0.2	New
Majority		5,455	11.4	−14.8
Turnout		47,726	65.6	−7.2
Registered electors		72,751		
Conservative hold		Swing	−11.5	

=== Elections in the 2010s ===
2019 notional result
Party	Vote	%
Conservative	29,211	55.5
Others	16,276	30.9
Labour	5,211	9.9
Green	1,935	3.7
Turnout	52,633	72.8
Electorate	72,315	

General election 2019: Beaconsfield
Party	Candidate	Votes	%	±%
Conservative	Joy Morrissey	32,477	56.1	−9.2
Independent	Dominic Grieve	16,765	29.0	N/A
Labour	Alexa Collins	5,756	9.9	−11.5
Green	Zoe Hatch	2,033	3.5	+1.0
Independent	Adam Cleary	837	1.4	New
Majority		15,712	27.1	−16.8
Turnout		57,868	74.5	+2.2
Registered electors		77,720		
Conservative hold		Swing		

General election 2017: Beaconsfield
Party	Candidate	Votes	%	±%
Conservative	Dominic Grieve	36,559	65.3	+2.1
Labour	James English	12,016	21.4	+10.0
Liberal Democrats	Peter Chapman	4,448	7.9	+0.5
UKIP	John Conway	1,609	2.9	−10.9
Green	Russell Secker	1,396	2.5	−1.7
Majority		24,543	43.9	−5.5
Turnout		56,028	72.3	+1.2
Conservative hold		Swing	−4.0	

General election 2015: Beaconsfield
Party	Candidate	Votes	%	±%
Conservative	Dominic Grieve	33,621	63.2	+2.1
UKIP	Tim Scott	7,310	13.8	+8.9
Labour	Tony Clements	6,074	11.4	−0.3
Liberal Democrats	Peter Chapman	3,927	7.4	−12.2
Green	Dave Hampton	2,231	4.2	+2.7
Majority		26,311	49.4	+7.9
Turnout		53,163	71.1	+1.1
Conservative hold		Swing	−3.3	

General election 2010: Beaconsfield
Party	Candidate	Votes	%	±%
Conservative	Dominic Grieve	32,053	61.1	+7.0
Liberal Democrats	John Edwards	10,271	19.6	−2.4
Labour	Jeremy Miles	6,135	11.7	−7.8
UKIP	Delphine Gray-Fisk	2,597	4.9	+0.1
Green	Jem Bailey	768	1.5	New
A Vote Against MP Expense Abuse	Andrew Cowen	475	0.9	New
Independent	Quentin Baron	191	0.4	New
Majority		21,782	41.5	+6.5
Turnout		52,490	70.0	+6.8
Conservative hold		Swing	+4.7	

=== Elections in the 2000s ===
General election 2005: Beaconsfield
Party	Candidate	Votes	%	±%
Conservative	Dominic Grieve	24,126	55.4	+2.6
Liberal Democrats	Peter Chapman	8,873	20.4	−1.2
Labour	Alex Sobel	8,422	19.4	−2.4
UKIP	John Fagan	2,102	4.8	+0.9
Majority		15,253	35.0	+4.0
Turnout		43,523	63.9	+3.1
Conservative hold		Swing	+1.9	

General election 2001: Beaconsfield
Party	Candidate	Votes	%	±%
Conservative	Dominic Grieve	22,233	52.8	+3.6
Labour	Stephen Lathrope	9,168	21.8	+1.8
Liberal Democrats	Stephen Lloyd	9,117	21.6	+0.2
UKIP	Andrew Moffatt	1,626	3.9	+3.0
Majority		13,065	31.0	+3.2
Turnout		42,144	60.8	−12.0
Conservative hold		Swing	+0.9	

=== Elections in the 1990s ===
General election 1997: Beaconsfield
Party	Candidate	Votes	%	±%
Conservative	Dominic Grieve	24,709	49.2	−14.8
Liberal Democrats	Peter Mapp	10,722	21.4	+2.1
Labour	Alastair Hudson	10,063	20.0	+6.5
Referendum	Humphrey Lloyd	2,197	4.4	New
Ind. Conservative	Christopher Story	1,434	2.9	New
UKIP	Christopher Cooke	451	0.9	New
ProLife Alliance	Gillian Duval	286	0.6	New
Natural Law	Tom Dyball	193	0.4	0.0
Independent	Robert Matthews	146	0.3	New
Majority		13,987	27.8	−16.9
Turnout		50,201	72.8	−6.2
Conservative hold		Swing	−8.2	

General election 1992: Beaconsfield
Party	Candidate	Votes	%	±%
Conservative	Tim Smith	33,817	64.0	−2.0
Liberal Democrats	Anne Purse	10,220	19.3	−4.4
Labour	Graham Smith	7,163	13.5	+3.2
Ind. Conservative	William Foulds	1,317	2.5	New
Natural Law	Andrew Foss	196	0.4	New
Independent	Joan Martin	166	0.3	New
Majority		23,597	44.7	+2.4
Turnout		52,879	79.0	+4.4
Conservative hold		Swing	+1.2	

=== Elections in the 1980s ===
General election 1987: Beaconsfield
Party	Candidate	Votes	%	±%
Conservative	Tim Smith	33,324	66.0	+2.2
Liberal	David Ive	11,985	23.7	−1.9
Labour	Kenneth Harper	5,203	10.3	−0.4
Majority		21,339	42.3	+4.1
Turnout		50,512	74.6	+2.2
Conservative hold		Swing	+2.0	

General election 1983: Beaconsfield
Party	Candidate	Votes	%	±%
Conservative	Tim Smith	30,552	63.8	
Liberal	David Ive	12,252	25.6	
Labour	Sherwin Smith	5,107	10.7	
Majority		18,300	38.2	
Turnout		47,911	72.4	
Conservative hold		Swing		

1982 Beaconsfield by-election
Party	Candidate	Votes	%	±%
Conservative	Tim Smith	23,049	61.8	+0.1
Liberal	Paul Tyler	9,996	26.8	+8.7
Labour	Tony Blair	3,886	10.4	−9.8
New Britain	Michael Byrne	225	0.6	New
Democratic Monarchist	Bill Boaks	99	0.3	New
Benn in Ten Unless Proportional Representation	Thomas Keen	51	0.1	New
Majority		13,053	35.0	−8.2
Turnout		37,306		
Conservative hold		Swing		

=== Elections in the 1970s ===
General election 1979: Beaconsfield
Party	Candidate	Votes	%	±%
Conservative	Ronald Bell	31,938	61.7	+13.4
Labour	Edwin Glasson	10,443	20.2	−5.3
Liberal	Percy Meyer	8,853	17.1	−9.1
National Front	John Noyes	548	1.1	New
Majority		21,495	41.5	+19.4
Turnout		51,782	76.2	+6.0
Conservative hold		Swing		

General election October 1974: Beaconsfield
Party	Candidate	Votes	%	±%
Conservative	Ronald Bell	23,234	48.3	−1.3
Liberal	William Eastwell	12,606	26.2	−2.0
Labour	Marigold Johnson	12,253	25.5	+3.2
Majority		10,628	22.1	+0.7
Turnout		48,093	70.2	−7.1
Conservative hold		Swing	+0.3	

General election February 1974: Beaconsfield
Party	Candidate	Votes	%	±%
Conservative	Ronald Bell	26,040	49.6	
Liberal	William Eastwell	14,792	28.2	
Labour	Peter Jones	11,691	22.3	
Majority		11,248	21.4	
Turnout		52,523	77.3	
Conservative win (new seat)				

== See also ==
- 1982 Beaconsfield by-election
- List of parliamentary constituencies in Buckinghamshire
- List of parliamentary constituencies in the South East England (region)

== Sources ==
- Richard Kimber's Political Science Resources: UK General Elections since 1832
