= Ashfield (constituency) =

Parliamentary constituency in the United Kingdom, 1955 onwards

Coordinates: 53.12°N 1.27°W

- County constituency for the House of Commons
- Interactive map of boundaries from 2024
- Location within the East Midlands
- County: Nottinghamshire
- Population: 101,914 (2011 census)
- Electorate: 69,819 (March 2020)
- Major settlements: Sutton-in-Ashfield, Kirkby-in-Ashfield

Current constituency
- Created: 1955
- Member of Parliament: Lee Anderson (Reform)
- Seats: One
- Created from: Broxtowe

Ashfield is a constituency represented in the House of Commons of the UK Parliament. It is in the English county of Nottinghamshire, East Midlands, to the northwest of the city of Nottingham, in the Erewash Valley along the border with neighbouring county Derbyshire.

Ashfield was part of the Red Wall, a group of constituencies in the Midlands and Northern England which formerly almost always voted for the Labour Party, until many of them switched to the Conservative Party in the 2019 general election. In the 2016 referendum on membership of the European Union, Ashfield voted 70% in favour of Brexit.

Since 2019, its Member of Parliament (MP) has been Lee Anderson, who was first elected as a Conservative, but switched to Reform UK in 2024, winning reelection later that year.

== Constituency profile ==
The constituency is located in Nottinghamshire and is roughly coterminous with the Ashfield local government district, excepting the town of Hucknall. The constituency contains the market towns of Kirkby-in-Ashfield and Sutton-in-Ashfield, as well as nearby villages including Huthwaite, Selston and Underwood.

Coal mining was formerly a significant part of the local economy. Residents of the constituency are, on average, less wealthy and less likely to be degree-educated than the rest of the country. The constituency's population is 96% white. The local government district has historically been Labour-controlled, but is currently run by the Ashfield Independents. Voters in the constituency overwhelmingly voted in favour of leaving the European Union in the 2016 referendum; Ashfield is estimated to have been in the top 20 most Brexit-supporting constituencies out of 650.

== Boundaries ==
=== Historic ===
Map of boundaries 2010–2024

1955–1974: The Urban Districts of Eastwood, Kirkby-in-Ashfield, and Sutton-in-Ashfield, and in the Rural District of Basford the parishes of Annesley, Bestwood Park, Brinsley, Felley, Linby, Newstead, Papplewick, and Selston.

1974–1983: The Urban Districts of Hucknall, Kirkby-in-Ashfield, and Sutton-in-Ashfield, and in the Rural District of Basford the parishes of Annesley, Felley, and Selston.

1983–2010: The District of Ashfield wards of Jacksdale, Kirkby-in-Ashfield Central, Kirkby-in-Ashfield East, Kirkby-in-Ashfield West, Selston, Sutton-in-Ashfield Central, Sutton-in-Ashfield East, Sutton-in-Ashfield North, Sutton-in-Ashfield West, Underwood, and Woodhouse, and the Borough of Broxtowe wards of Brinsley, Eastwood East, Eastwood North, and Eastwood South.

2010–2024: The District of Ashfield wards of Jacksdale, Kirkby-in-Ashfield Central, Kirkby-in-Ashfield East, Kirkby-in-Ashfield West, Selston, Sutton-in-Ashfield Central, Sutton-in-Ashfield East, Sutton-in-Ashfield North, Sutton-in-Ashfield West, Underwood, and Woodhouse, and the Borough of Broxtowe wards of Brinsley, Eastwood North and Greasley Beauvale, and Eastwood South.

=== Current ===
Following the 2023 review of Westminster constituencies, and reflecting the local government boundary review in the District of Mansfield which came into effect in May 2023, the constituency is composed of the following with effect from the 2024 general election:

- The District of Ashfield wards of: Abbey Hill; Annesley & Kirkby Woodhouse; Ashfields; Carsic; Huthwaite & Brierley; Jacksdale; Kingsway; Kirkby Cross & Portland; Larwood; Leamington; St. Mary’s; Selston; Skegby; Stanton Hill & Teversal; Summit; Sutton Central & New Cross; Sutton Junction & Harlow Wood; The Dales; Underwood.
- Parts of the District of Mansfield wards of: Lindhurst; Pleasley; Rufford; Sherwood.

The parts in the Borough of Broxtowe were transferred to the Broxtowe constituency and the parts in Mansfield District were transferred from the Mansfield constituency.

== History ==
Until the Conservatives gained the seat at the 2019 general election, the constituency had almost always been a Labour Party seat since its creation for the 1955 general election. The Ashfield constituency has been served by a former Secretary of State, Geoff Hoon, and, from its creation until 2019, was only served by one member of another party, Tim Smith of the Conservative Party, for two years from 1977 to 1979. Ashfield's 2019 result suggested it may have been a safe seat for the Conservatives.

In 2010, the seat had a marginal majority of only 192 votes over the Liberal Democrats, but that was increased to 8,820 in 2015 after a collapse in the Liberal Democrat vote, with the Conservatives finishing in second place.

In 2017, there was another narrow margin of victory for Labour after an 8.9% swing to the Conservatives, who squeezed most of the fairly substantial UKIP vote from two years earlier, and also a large vote for the Ashfield Independents candidate of nearly 10%, but Labour on that occasion did just enough to hang on by just over 400 votes. In 2019, the Ashfield Independents candidate Jason Zadrozny, who had come close to winning the seat for the Liberal Democrats nine years earlier, came second with a substantial vote, and the Conservatives took the seat despite achieving fewer votes and a smaller percentage of the total vote than in 2017.

When the MP Lee Anderson left the Tories to become an independent and then subsequently join Reform UK, he contested it once again in the 2024 election, managing to win it for the party due to their message resounding with the predominantly pro-Brexit electorate and Anderson having the advantage of incumbency.

== Members of Parliament ==
Election	Member	Party
1955	Will Warbey	Labour
1966	David Marquand	Labour
1977 by-election	Tim Smith	Conservative
1979	Frank Haynes	Labour
1992	Geoff Hoon	Labour
2010	Gloria De Piero	Labour
2019	Lee Anderson	Conservative
February 2024	Lee Anderson	Independent
March 2024	Lee Anderson	Reform UK

== Elections ==
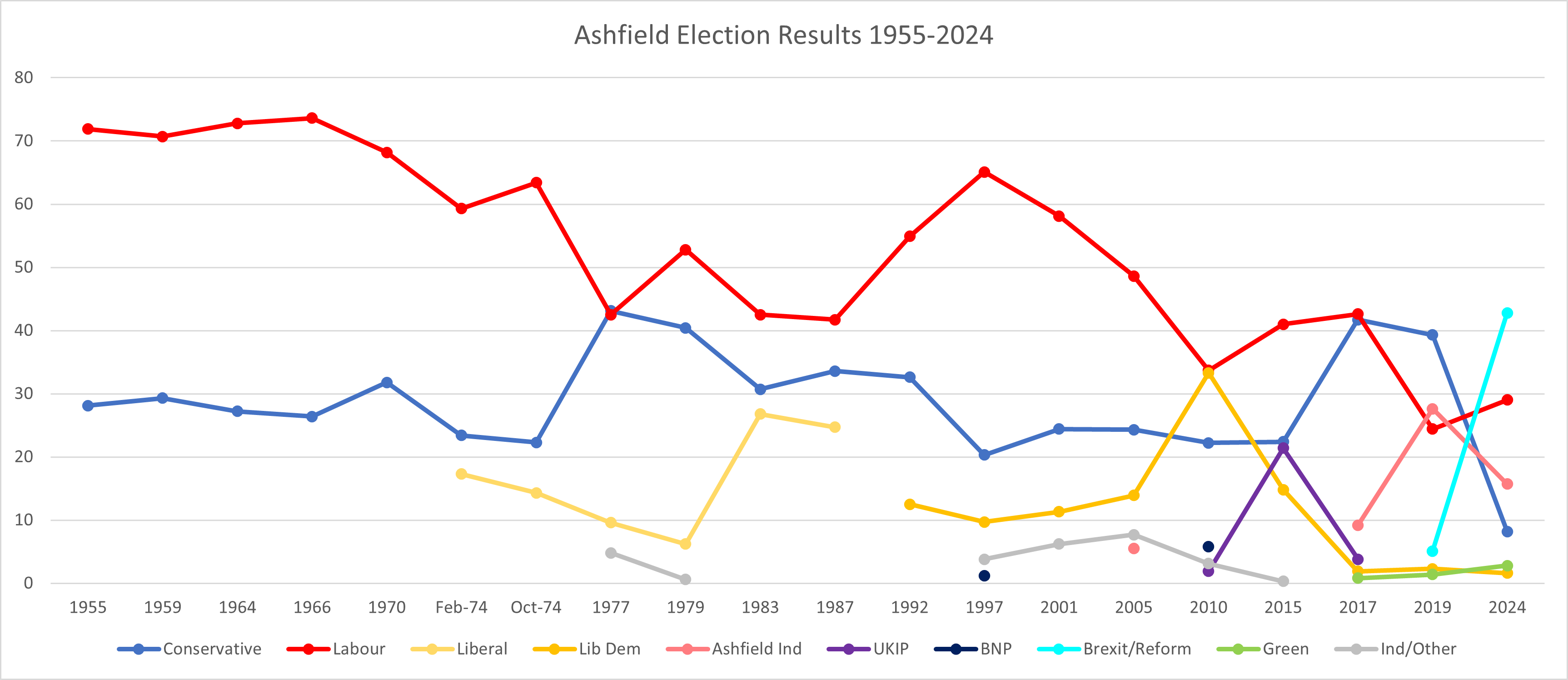
Ashfield Election Results 1955-2024

=== Elections in the 2020s ===
General election 2024: Ashfield
Party	Candidate	Votes	%	±%
Reform	Lee Anderson	17,062	42.8	▲37.8
Labour	Rhea Keehn	11,554	29.0	▲3.4
Ashfield Ind.	Jason Zadrozny	6,276	15.7	▼11.2
Conservative	Debbie Soloman	3,271	8.2	▼31.0
Green	Alexander Coates	1,100	2.8	▲1.5
Liberal Democrats	Daniel Holmes	619	1.6	▼0.5
Majority		5,509	13.8	▲2.1
Turnout		39,882	57.9	▼3.6
Registered electors		68,929		
Reform gain from Conservative		Swing	▲24.1	

=== Elections in the 2010s ===
2019 notional result
Party	Vote	%
Conservative	16,838	39.2
Ashfield Independents	11,535	26.9
Labour	10,986	25.6
Brexit Party	2,137	5.0
Liberal Democrats	890	2.1
Green Party	563	1.3
Majority	5,303	12.3
Turnout	42,949	61.5
Electorate	69,819	

General election 2019: Ashfield
Party	Candidate	Votes	%	±%
Conservative	Lee Anderson	19,231	39.3	▼2.4
Ashfield Ind.	Jason Zadrozny	13,498	27.6	▲18.4
Labour	Natalie Fleet	11,971	24.4	▼18.2
Brexit Party	Martin Daubney	2,501	5.1	New
Liberal Democrats	Rebecca Wain	1,105	2.3	▲0.4
Green	Rose Woods	674	1.4	▲0.6
Majority		5,733	11.7	▲10.8
Turnout		48,980	62.6	▼1.4
Registered electors		78,204		
Conservative gain from Labour		Swing	▲7.9	

General election 2017: Ashfield
Party	Candidate	Votes	%	±%
Labour	Gloria De Piero	21,285	42.6	▲1.6
Conservative	Tony Harper	20,844	41.7	▲19.3
Ashfield Ind.	Gail Turner	4,612	9.2	New
UKIP	Ray Young	1,885	3.8	▼17.6
Liberal Democrats	Bob Charlesworth	969	1.9	▼12.9
Green	Arran Rangi	398	0.8	New
Majority		441	0.9	▼17.7
Turnout		49,993	64.0	▲5.5
Registered electors		78,076		
Labour hold		Swing	▼8.9	

General election 2015: Ashfield
Party	Candidate	Votes	%	±%
Labour	Gloria De Piero	19,448	41.0	▲7.3
Conservative	Helen Harrison	10,628	22.4	▲0.2
UKIP	Simon Ashcroft	10,150	21.4	▲19.5
Liberal Democrats	Philip Smith	7,030	14.8	▼18.5
Justice for Men and Boys	Mike Buchanan	153	0.3	New
Majority		8,820	18.6	▲18.2
Turnout		47,409	61.5	▼0.8
Registered electors		77,091		
Labour hold		Swing	▲3.6	

The Liberal Democrats had again selected Jason Zadrozny as their prospective parliamentary candidate for the 2015 general election, but he was suspended by the party and removed as a candidate just weeks before the election after being arrested; he was later cleared. He was replaced by Philip Smith.

General election 2010: Ashfield
Party	Candidate	Votes	%	±%
Labour	Gloria De Piero	16,239	33.7	▼15.0
Liberal Democrats	Jason Zadrozny	16,047	33.3	▲19.5
Conservative	Garry Hickton	10,698	22.2	▼2.2
BNP	Edward Holmes	2,781	5.8	New
English Democrat	Tony Ellis	1,102	2.3	New
UKIP	Terry Coleman	933	1.9	New
Independent	Eddie Smith	396	0.8	New
Majority		192	0.4	▼23.9
Turnout		48,196	62.3	▲5.2
Registered electors		77,379		
Labour hold		Swing	▼17.2	

=== Elections in the 2000s ===
General election 2005: Ashfield
Party	Candidate	Votes	%	±%
Labour	Geoff Hoon	20,433	48.6	▼9.5
Conservative	Giles Inglis-Jones	10,220	24.3	▼0.1
Liberal Democrats	Wendy Johnson	5,829	13.9	▲2.6
Ashfield Independents (2005)	Roy Adkins	2,292	5.5	New
Independent	Kate Allsop	1,900	4.5	New
Veritas	Sarah Hemstock	1,108	2.6	New
Independent	Eddie Grenfell	269	0.6	New
Majority		10,213	24.3	▼9.4
Turnout		42,051	57.3	▲3.7
Registered electors		73,321		
Labour hold		Swing	▼4.7	

General election 2001: Ashfield
Party	Candidate	Votes	%	±%
Labour	Geoff Hoon	22,875	58.1	▼7.0
Conservative	Julian Leigh	9,607	24.4	▲4.1
Liberal Democrats	William Smith	4,428	11.3	▲1.6
Independent	Charlie Harby	1,471	3.7	New
Socialist Alliance	George Watson	589	1.5	New
Socialist Labour	Katrina R. Howse	380	1.0	New
Majority		13,268	33.7	▼11.1
Turnout		39,350	53.6	▼16.4
Registered electors		73,428		
Labour hold		Swing	▼5.6	

=== Elections in the 1990s ===
General election 1997: Ashfield
Party	Candidate	Votes	%	±%
Labour	Geoff Hoon	32,979	65.1	▲10.2
Conservative	Mark Simmonds	10,251	20.3	▼12.3
Liberal Democrats	William E. Smith	4,882	9.7	▼2.8
Referendum	Martin I. Betts	1,896	3.8	New
BNP	Steven E. Belshaw	595	1.2	New
Majority		22,728	44.8	▲21.5
Turnout		50,603	70.0	▼10.4
Registered electors		72,299		
Labour hold		Swing	▲11.3	

General election 1992: Ashfield
Party	Candidate	Votes	%	±%
Labour	Geoff Hoon	32,018	54.9	▲13.2
Conservative	Laurence Robertson	19,031	32.6	▼1.0
Liberal Democrats	James S. Turton	7,291	12.5	▼12.2
Majority		12,987	22.3	▲14.2
Turnout		58,340	80.4	▲3.2
Registered electors		75,075		
Labour hold		Swing	▲7.1	

=== Elections in the 1980s ===
General election 1987: Ashfield
Party	Candidate	Votes	%	±%
Labour	Frank Haynes	22,812	41.7	0.0
Conservative	Barry Coleman	18,412	33.6	▲2.9
Liberal	Frances Stein	13,542	24.7	▼2.1
Majority		4,400	8.1	▼2.9
Turnout		54,756	77.2	▲2.4
Registered electors		70,937		
Labour hold		Swing	▼1.5	

General election 1983: Ashfield
Party	Candidate	Votes	%	±%
Labour	Frank Haynes	21,859	41.7	▼11.1
Conservative	Roderick Seligman	15,772	30.7	▼9.7
Liberal	Frances Stein	13,812	26.8	▲20.6
Majority		6,087	11.0	▼1.4
Turnout		51,443	74.8	▼5.8
Registered electors		69,791		
Labour hold		Swing	▼0.7	

=== Elections in the 1970s ===
General election 1979: Ashfield
Party	Candidate	Votes	%	±%
Labour	Frank Haynes	33,116	52.8	▼10.6
Conservative	Tim Smith	25,319	40.4	▲18.1
Liberal	Hampton Flint	3,914	6.2	▼8.1
National Front	W. Annable	397	0.6	N/A
Majority		7,797	12.4	▼28.7
Turnout		62,746	80.6	▲5.9
Registered electors		77,878		
Labour hold		Swing	▼14.4	

By-election 1977: Ashfield
Party	Candidate	Votes	%	±%
Conservative	Tim Smith	19,616	43.1	▲20.8
Labour	Michael Cowan	19,352	42.5	▼20.9
Liberal	Hampton Flint	4,380	9.6	▼4.7
National Front	George Herrod	1,734	3.8	New
Socialist Workers	June Hall	453	1.0	New
Majority		264	0.6	N/A
Turnout		45,535		
Conservative gain from Labour		Swing	▲20.8	

General election October 1974: Ashfield
Party	Candidate	Votes	%	±%
Labour	David Marquand	35,367	63.4	▲4.1
Conservative	Richard Kemm	12,452	22.3	▼1.1
Liberal	Hampton Flint	7,959	14.3	▼3.0
Majority		22,915	41.1	▲5.2
Turnout		55,778	74.7	▼12.7
Registered electors		74,701		
Labour hold		Swing		

General election February 1974: Ashfield
Party	Candidate	Votes	%	±%
Labour	David Marquand	35,994	59.3	▼11.0
Conservative	Richard Kemm	14,206	23.4	▼6.3
Liberal	Hampton Flint	10,534	17.3	New
Majority		21,788	35.9	▼0.5
Turnout		60,734	82.0	▲11.8
Registered electors		74,064		
Labour hold		Swing		

General election 1970: Ashfield
Party	Candidate	Votes	%	±%
Labour	David Marquand	32,372	68.2	▼5.4
Conservative	Richard Kemm	15,089	31.8	▲5.4
Majority		17,283	36.4	▼11.4
Turnout		47,461	70.2	▼3.1
Registered electors		67,681		
Labour hold		Swing	▼5.4	

=== Elections in the 1960s ===
General election 1966: Ashfield
Party	Candidate	Votes	%	±%
Labour	David Marquand	33,477	73.6	▲0.8
Conservative	E.T. Gibbons	11,991	26.4	▼0.8
Majority		21,486	47.8	▲2.1
Turnout		45,468	73.3	▼3.9
Registered electors		62,030		
Labour hold		Swing		

General election 1964: Ashfield
Party	Candidate	Votes	%	±%
Labour	William Warbey	34,841	72.8	▲2.1
Conservative	T.L. Wright	12,989	27.2	▼2.1
Majority		21,852	45.7	▲4.3
Turnout		47,830	77.2	▼4.8
Registered electors		61,960		
Labour hold		Swing		

=== Elections in the 1950s ===
General election 1959: Ashfield
Party	Candidate	Votes	%	±%
Labour	William Warbey	35,432	70.7	▼1.2
Conservative	Julian G.W. Sandys	14,690	29.3	▲1.2
Majority		20,742	41.4	▼2.5
Turnout		50,122	82.0	▲5.5
Registered electors		61,139		
Labour hold		Swing		

General election 1955: Ashfield
Party	Candidate	Votes	%	±%
Labour	William Warbey	32,905	71.9	N/A
Conservative	Alan S. Plane	12,836	28.1	N/A
Majority		20,069	43.9	N/A
Turnout		45,741	76.5	N/A
Registered electors		59,820		
Labour win (new seat)				

== See also ==
- 1977 Ashfield by-election
- parliamentary constituencies in Nottinghamshire

== Sources ==
- Youngs, Frederic A., Guide to the Local Administrative Units of England, Vol II, Northern England, London, 1991
