= 2019 United Kingdom prorogation controversy =

Unlawful and voided suspension of Parliament

On 27 or 28 August 2019, the prime minister of the United Kingdom Boris Johnson advised Queen Elizabeth II to prorogue Parliament from a date between 9 and 12 September 2019 until the State Opening of Parliament on 14 October 2019. As a result, Parliament was suspended from 9 September until 24 September, when the prorogation was ruled unlawful by the Supreme Court. Since Parliament was to be prorogued for five weeks and reconvene just 17 days before the United Kingdom's scheduled departure from the European Union on 31 October 2019, the move was seen by many opposition politicians and political commentators as a controversial and unconstitutional attempt by the prime minister to avoid parliamentary scrutiny of the Government's Brexit plans in the final weeks leading up to Brexit. Johnson and his Government defended the prorogation of Parliament as a routine political process that ordinarily follows the selection of a new prime minister and would allow the Government to refocus on a legislative agenda.

In early September 2019, judges in the High Court of Justice and the Outer House of the Court of Session (the English and Scottish civil courts of first instance) declined to rule on the lawfulness of the prorogation on grounds that the prerogative power of prorogation was not justiciable. An appeal in the latter case to the Inner House of the Court of Session (Scotland's supreme civil court) overturned the Outer House verdict and ruled the prorogation was justiciable and unlawful, void and of no effect. To resolve the differences of opinion between the courts, both cases were appealed to the Supreme Court of the United Kingdom which, on 24 September, ruled unanimously in R (Miller) v The Prime Minister and Cherry v Advocate General for Scotland upholding the ruling of the Inner House; consequently, the Order in Council ordering prorogation was quashed and Parliament was ruled to still be in session. When Parliament resumed on the following day, the prorogation ceremony was expunged from the Journal of the House of Commons and business continued as if the prorogation never happened. On 8 October, Parliament was lawfully prorogued, this time for six days, to the desired date of 14 October.

== Background ==
Prorogation is a political process which marks the end of a parliamentary session, and also refers to the time between the end of one parliamentary session and the start of another. During prorogation, neither Parliament nor its committees sit, and all motions, unanswered questions, and bills not yet assented to automatically lapse, unless a so-called "carry-over motion" allows for the business to be resumed in the next session. Prorogation is a power under the royal prerogative and is ordered by the King-in-Council, that is, the King under advice of the Privy Council. Prorogation takes effect when a royal proclamation which orders the prorogation is read to both Houses of Parliament; from that point, Parliament does not meet again until the State Opening of Parliament some days later. (Note: Parliament may be recalled during prorogation for other reasons provided in statute, such as the demise of the Crown (Succession to the Crown Act 1707), if the reserve forces are called into service (Reserve Forces Act 1996), or if emergency powers under the Civil Contingencies Act 2004 are exercised. (Natzler & Hutton 2019)) It is distinct from adjournment and recess, which are short breaks that do not halt all parliamentary business, and dissolution, which disperses Parliament in advance of a general election. Since 1854, prorogation has been undertaken by the Lords Commissioners in lieu of the Sovereign. (Note: The Royal Commission is typically composed of the Lord Speaker, Leader of the House of Lords, the chairs of the two largest parties not otherwise represented, and the convenor of the crossbench peers. The Archbishop of Canterbury and Lord Chancellor are also Lords Commissioners, but typically do not participate in Commission business. (Cowie 2019))

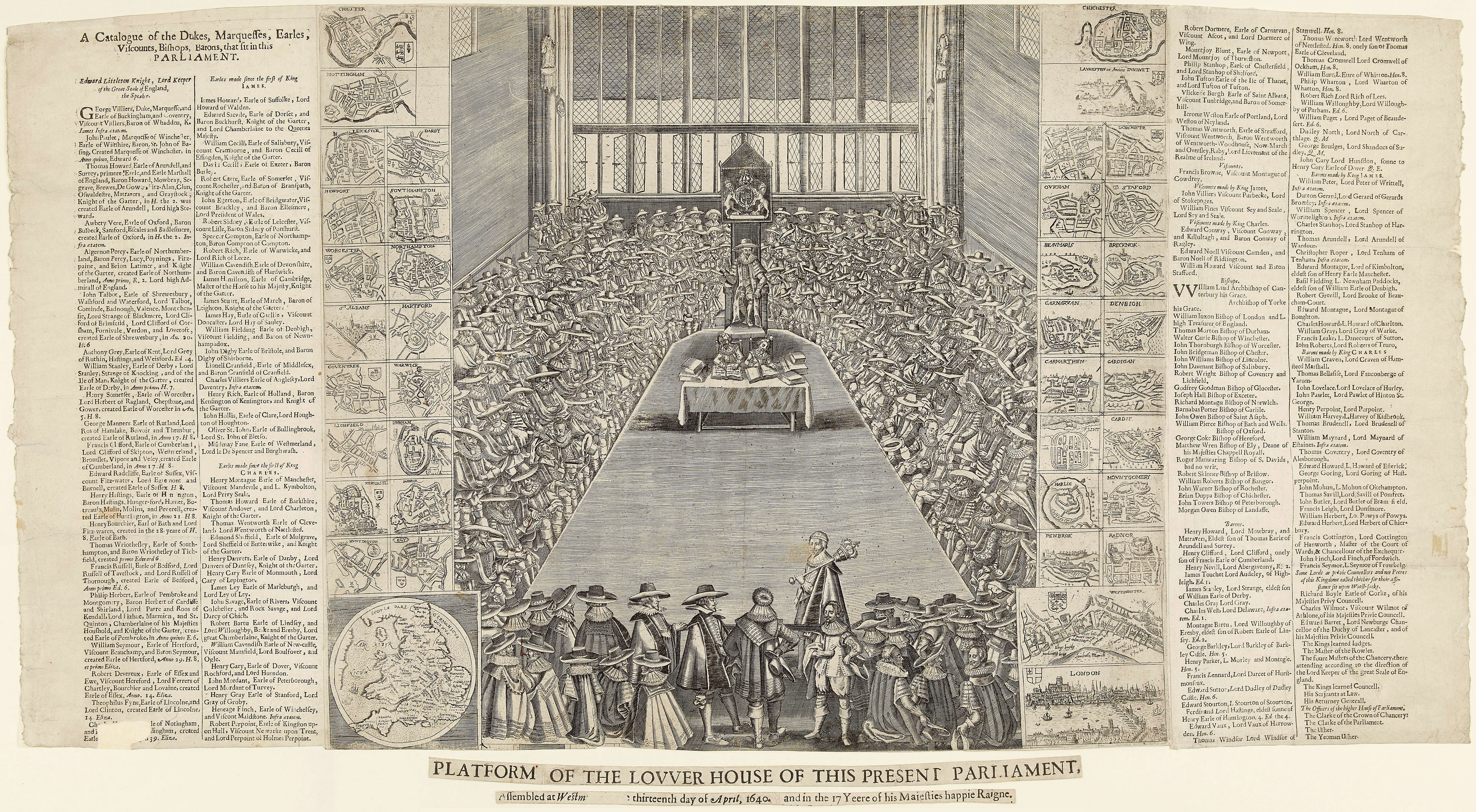
The Long Parliament, which prevented its own prorogation and reaffirmed the Petition of Right in 1641.

Historically, the prorogation of Parliament was the norm; the monarch would typically only summon Parliament to approve royal taxes and summarily prorogue the body again. Prorogation was also used as a royal tactic to avoid parliamentary scrutiny. Elizabeth I suspended Parliament in 1578 to prevent public debate of her courtship with Francis, Duke of Anjou. The turning point came in the prelude to the English Civil War, when Charles I prorogued his third Parliament. Parliament objected to royal imposition of taxes and issued the Petition of Right in response to the King's actions. When the Speaker of the House of Commons, John Finch, announced the end of the session, incensed MPs sat on Finch, which momentarily prevented the closure of Parliament until the Commons passed several motions which condemned the King's abuse of power. After Parliament was prorogued, Charles I ruled on his own for eleven years—and even attempted to close down the Parliament of Scotland in 1638—and only recalled Parliament in 1640 to pass more taxes. The second sitting of Parliament that year—the famous Long Parliament—passed legislation which prevented its prorogation or dissolution without its consent. In the event, it sat undissolved for another twenty years throughout the English Civil War, Interregnum, and Restoration, despite Pride's Purge in 1648 which created the Rump Parliament and Oliver Cromwell's expulsion of the Long Parliament and convocation of an alternative assembly in 1653.

Although prorogation is typically uncontroversial, there have been several noteworthy prorogations during major political disputes. In 1774, upon the advice of Lord North, George III prorogued Parliament after the passage of the Quebec Act, one of the triggers of the American Revolution. In 1831, peers took umbrage at William IV's prorogation of Parliament after the Commons defeated the First Reform Bill which sought to expand the franchise. In 1948, Clement Attlee called a short pro forma session of Parliament, which was prorogued after ten days, to hasten the passage of the Parliament Act 1949, and in 1997, John Major advised an early prorogation prior to the general election in May, at the height of the cash-for-questions affair.

The most controversial prorogation of recent times took place in 2008 in Canada. Stephen Harper, the prime minister and leader of the minority Conservative government, advised the governor general, Michaëlle Jean, to prorogue Parliament prior to the budget. At the time, the Liberal and New Democratic parties planned to form an alternative government with the support of the Bloc Québécois. Prorogation postponed the motion of no confidence in Harper's government; and by the time Parliament sat again, the agreement between the opposition parties fell apart and Harper remained in office. Harper controversially advised Jean to prorogue Parliament again in late 2009, until after the 2010 Winter Olympics; at the time, Harper was under heavy scrutiny for his role in the Afghan detainee affair. There was a similar crisis in Australia in 1975 that concerned the use of royal powers to break parliamentary deadlock. The prime minister, Gough Whitlam, was controversially dismissed by the governor-general, John Kerr, and replaced by the leader of the Opposition, Malcolm Fraser, who commanded a majority in the Senate. The House of Representatives, controlled by the Australian Labor Party, passed a motion of no confidence in Fraser, but was unable to reinstall Whitlam before Kerr dissolved Parliament in advance of a federal election.

== Prelude ==
=== Under Theresa May ===
Proposals of prorogation first surfaced in early 2019. At the time, the parliamentary session had been ongoing since 13 June 2017, several days after a general election which saw the governing Conservative Party, then led by Theresa May, lose its majority. Prior to 2010, parliamentary sessions typically started in October and ended in September; general elections would shorten the preceding session and lengthen the following. After the Fixed-term Parliaments Act 2011—which abrogated the similar royal power to dissolve Parliament—passed into law, the regular start of the parliamentary calendar moved to coincide with elections in May. In June 2017, the Government announced the imminent parliamentary session would last for two years, to allow for greater parliamentary scrutiny of Brexit and the repeal or amendment of the corpus of European law which would no longer have effect upon the United Kingdom's departure from the European Union. On 7 May 2019, the 2017–19 Parliament became the longest parliamentary session since the Long Parliament four centuries earlier. (Note: Other long parliamentary sessions of note include: the Convention Parliament which followed the Glorious Revolution of 1688 (250 days); the 1893–94 Parliament, when Gladstone attempted to pass the Second Home Rule Bill (226 days); the 1992–93 Parliament, when Parliament debated the Maastricht Treaty (240 days); the 1997–98 Parliament, which passed wide-ranging constitutional reforms (242 days); and the aforementioned 2010–12 Parliament (295 days). (Hicks 2019))

After the Brexit withdrawal agreement negotiated by the Government was rejected by Parliament, prorogation was seen as an option for the Government to bring the agreement back for another vote; Erskine May, which conventionally codifies parliamentary practice, states that "matters already decided" cannot be brought back during a parliamentary session if they have already been rejected on a substantive basis. The Speaker of the House of Commons, John Bercow, allowed a second vote on the agreement on 12 March 2019, which was rejected with a reduced majority. On 18 March, Bercow said any motion to approve the withdrawal agreement for a vote must not be "substantially the same", and on 27 March, reiterated his warning to the Government. A third "meaningful vote" on the withdrawal agreement, which did not include the "political declaration" on future EU–UK relations, was lost by the Government on 29 March 2019.

Contemporaneously, the United Kingdom's withdrawal from the European Union, previously scheduled for 29 March 2019, was delayed to 12 April 2019. Proponents of leaving the European Union without a deal suggested prorogation as a method to ensure such a departure; the United Kingdom's withdrawal remained the legal default with or without a negotiated withdrawal agreement, and the prorogation of Parliament would prevent legislation to either ratify the agreement, seek an extension to Brexit negotiations, or revoke the invocation of Article 50 of the Treaty on European Union. Prorogation would also prevent a motion of no confidence or a motion to trigger an early general election. After persistent rumours of this course of action, despite Parliament's explicit rejection of a "no-deal" scenario, opposition MPs took control of the legislative calendar and passed the European Union (Withdrawal) Act 2019, also known as the "Cooper–Letwin Bill", which mandated the Government to seek a longer extension to Brexit negotiations. A subsequent agreement with the European Council delayed Brexit once again to 31 October 2019 and mandated elections to the European Parliament.

Following the European elections, in which the Conservatives finished fifth in the UK behind the Brexit Party, Liberal Democrats, Labour Party and Green Party, Theresa May announced her intention to resign as prime minister after a new Conservative leader was elected in July. In the interim period, opposition MPs asked whether a new prime minister would use prorogation to reduce parliamentary scrutiny of the Government's Brexit policy, which the Government did not rule out. In response, Bercow said from the chair that "Parliament will not be evacuated from the centre stage of the decision-making process on this important matter". He further said such a statement was "so blindly obvious so as not to need stating" but was dismayed by the fact it needed to be said.

=== Under Boris Johnson ===
Boris Johnson, an outspoken critic of the withdrawal agreement, was elected Conservative leader on 23 July 2019 and became prime minister on the following day. As part of his strategy to ensure, "do or die", the UK's withdrawal from the EU on 31 October 2019, Johnson's campaign team and political commentators saw prorogation as a viable method to effect the policy. On 18 July, Johnson's imminent victory led opposition MPs to successfully amend the Northern Ireland (Executive Formation etc) Bill to make prorogation during late October functionally impossible; the Act requires the Government to lay reports before Parliament, which would then sit to debate them even during the body's suspension. On 25 July, the newly appointed Leader of the House of Commons, Jacob Rees-Mogg, who had suggested the possibility of prorogation when he was a backbencher, said the Prime Minister viewed it as an "archaic mechanism" which he did not want to use. He stated that under the doctrine of collective ministerial responsibility, he therefore opposed prorogation.

During the summer recess, prorogation was still seen as a likely prospect. At the Edinburgh Festival Fringe, Bercow said he would "fight with every breath in [his] body" to prevent the suspension of Parliament, as he believed Parliament's right to sit and debate was sacrosanct. On 27 August 2019, over 150 cross-party opposition MPs signed the Church House Declaration—named after the Headquarters of the Church of England and former temporary parliamentary chamber near Parliament—and pledged to "do whatever is necessary" to prevent Parliament being prorogued. Opposition MPs also mooted the traditional conference season recess; in 2019, the conference season started with the Liberal Democrat conference, which began on 14 September, and ended with the closure of Conservative conference on 2 October.

== Prorogation ==
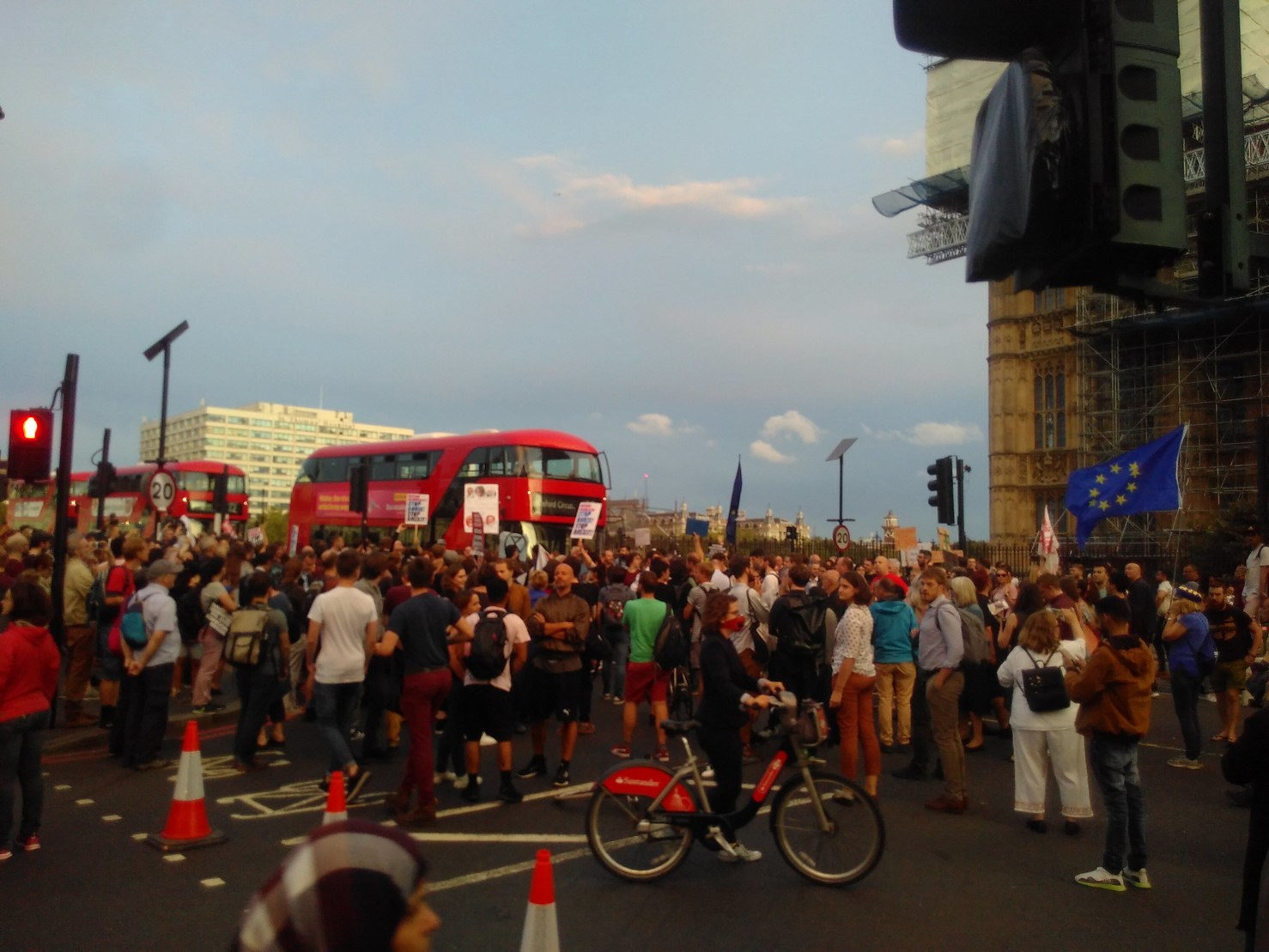
Protestors block Westminster Bridge outside Parliament on 28 August 2019.

In the week ending 24 August 2019, it was reported that within the previous 10 days Johnson had asked the attorney general, Geoffrey Cox, for legal advice on the matter of prorogation, tentatively scheduled for between the return of Parliament on 3 September and the European Council meeting on 17 October. On 28 August, Jacob Rees-Mogg, in the role of Lord President of the Council, convened a small Privy Council meeting with Mark Spencer as Chief Whip, Baroness Evans of Bowes Park as Leader of the House of Lords and the Queen whilst she was in residence at Balmoral Castle. (Note: The only other reported members of the Privy Council in attendance were the Leader of the House of Lords, Baroness Evans, and the Chief Whip, Mark Spencer. (Swinford & Zeffman 2019)) The Queen gave her consent to prorogation, to start on the week beginning 9 September, and end with the State Opening of Parliament on 14 October.

Such a long prorogation was seen as unprecedented. Since 1979, Parliament has not been prorogued for more than three weeks, and is typically prorogued for less than a week, as opposed to the five-week prorogation requested by the government. Bercow described the prorogation as a "constitutional outrage" designed to "stop MPs debating Brexit". Opposition politicians stated their opposition to prorogation: First Minister of Scotland Nicola Sturgeon (SNP) described Johnson's actions as like a "tin-pot dictator", First Minister of Wales Mark Drakeford (Labour) said Johnson wanted to "close the doors" on democracy and Liberal Democrat leader Jo Swinson called prorogation a "dangerous and unacceptable course of action". Supporters of the Government defended the prorogation. Conservative chairman James Cleverly described the prorogation of Parliament followed by a Queen's Speech as something "all new governments do", President of the United States Donald Trump expressed his support for Johnson, via Twitter, and former First Minister of Northern Ireland Arlene Foster (DUP) welcomed prorogation as an opportunity to review and renegotiate the confidence and supply agreement her party entered into with the Government. Within hours of the announcement, impromptu protests took place in major cities; a demonstration to "stop the coup" outside Parliament claimed an attendance of several thousand.

=== Loss of working majority ===
Upon Parliament's return on 3 September 2019, Conservative MP and "no-deal" opponent Oliver Letwin made an emergency motion to introduce a bill which sought to delay Brexit past 31 October. The motion would allow backbench control of the timetable for 4 September to pass, in one day, what would become the European Union (Withdrawal) (No. 2) Act 2019. Letwin was successful due to the rebellion of 21 Conservative MPs who were subsequently suspended from the party; coupled with the defection of Phillip Lee to the Liberal Democrats, Johnson lost his working majority on his second day in Parliament as prime minister. The Government then attempted to filibuster the bill in the House of Lords to prevent the bill's passage before prorogation; the Government later discontinued the filibuster and allowed the bill to pass the Lords on 6 September, and subsequently receive Royal Assent on 9 September.

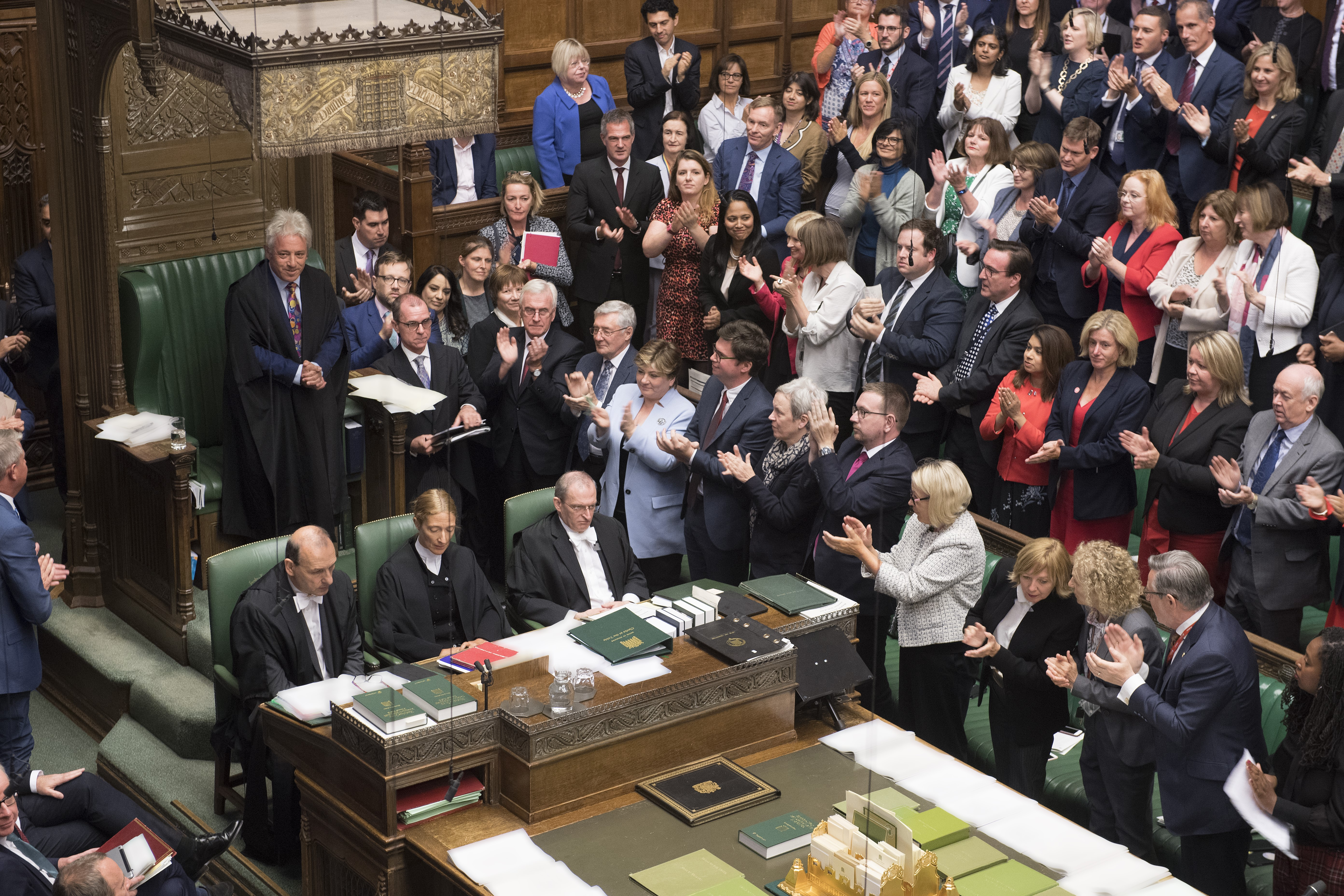
Opposition MPs applaud Bercow as he sets the date for his retirement.

Following the bill's passage into law, Johnson reiterated his commitment to ensure the UK's withdrawal from the EU took place on 31 October. This sparked speculation he could be imprisoned for contempt of court or otherwise removed from office for failing to uphold the law. The Government also attempted twice to trigger an early general election, on 6 September and 9 September; both attempts failed, as opposition parties refused to support a motion on the basis it would dissolve Parliament and similarly make it unable to prevent a no-deal Brexit. On 9 September 2019, the House of Commons voted 311–302 for a humble address for a return to force the Government to turn over, within 48 hours, all communications within the Prime Minister's Office related to prorogation as well as publish all documents related to no-deal preparations under Operation Yellowhammer. In Westminster Hall, MPs debated two e-petitions: one supported prorogation and garnered 100,000 signatures before being closed, and the other opposed prorogation and garnered 1.7 million signatures in several weeks. On the same day, Bercow announced his resignation as Speaker, effective 31 October 2019, amidst speculation the Conservatives would break the tradition of not standing against the Speaker at the next general election. His resignation beforehand triggered a speakership election in which the Government would find it difficult to install a friendlier Speaker.

=== Prorogation ===
The procedures for prorogation occurred shortly before 2 am local time on 10 September 2019, when Sarah Clarke, Lady Usher of the Black Rod, entered the Commons chamber to signal the start of the formal ceremony amidst shouts of protest from the opposition benches. Bercow, who was then surrounded by opposition MPs who held makeshift signs that read "silenced", said that the intended prorogation "was not a normal or standard" prorogation, being "one of the longest for decades" and that it "represents not just in the minds of many colleagues, but to huge numbers of people outside, an act of executive fiat" before he departed to the House of Lords for the ceremony. As many Conservative MPs followed him out of the chamber, many in opposition heckled the Government with chants of "shame on you". The ceremony in the Lords was boycotted by opposition peers; this included the Labour and Liberal Democrat leaders in the Lords, Baroness Smith of Basildon and Lord Newby, and caused the procedure to be performed with only three of the Lords Commissioners instead of the usual five. There were only sixteen peers in attendance: thirteen Conservatives, two crossbenchers and one Lord Spiritual . The session closed minutes later. Upon his return to the Commons chamber alone, Bercow was cheered by opposition MPs before he read the notice of prorogation, later declared to be void.

Lords Commissioners at prorogation

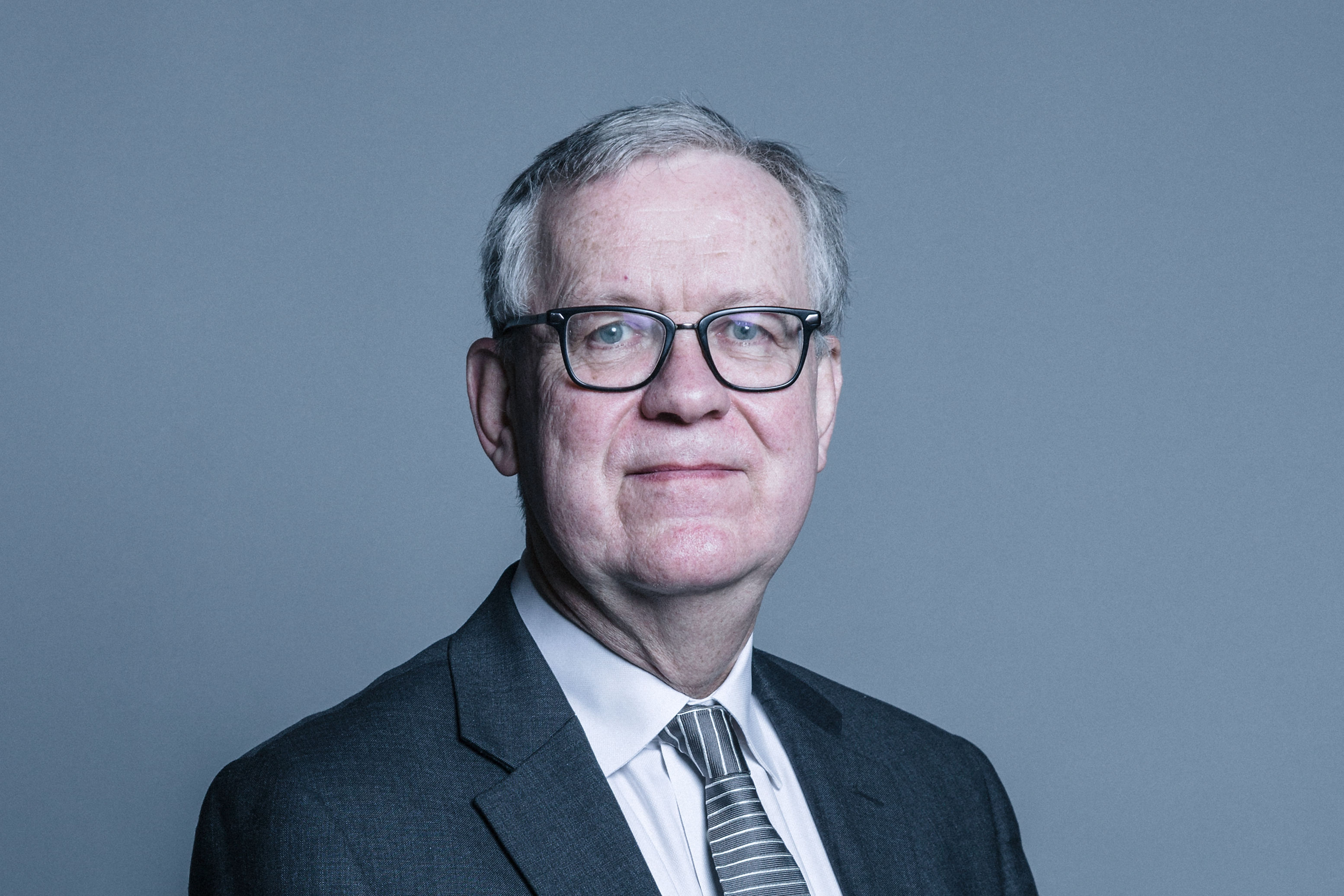
Lord Newby
(Liberal Democrat, boycotted)

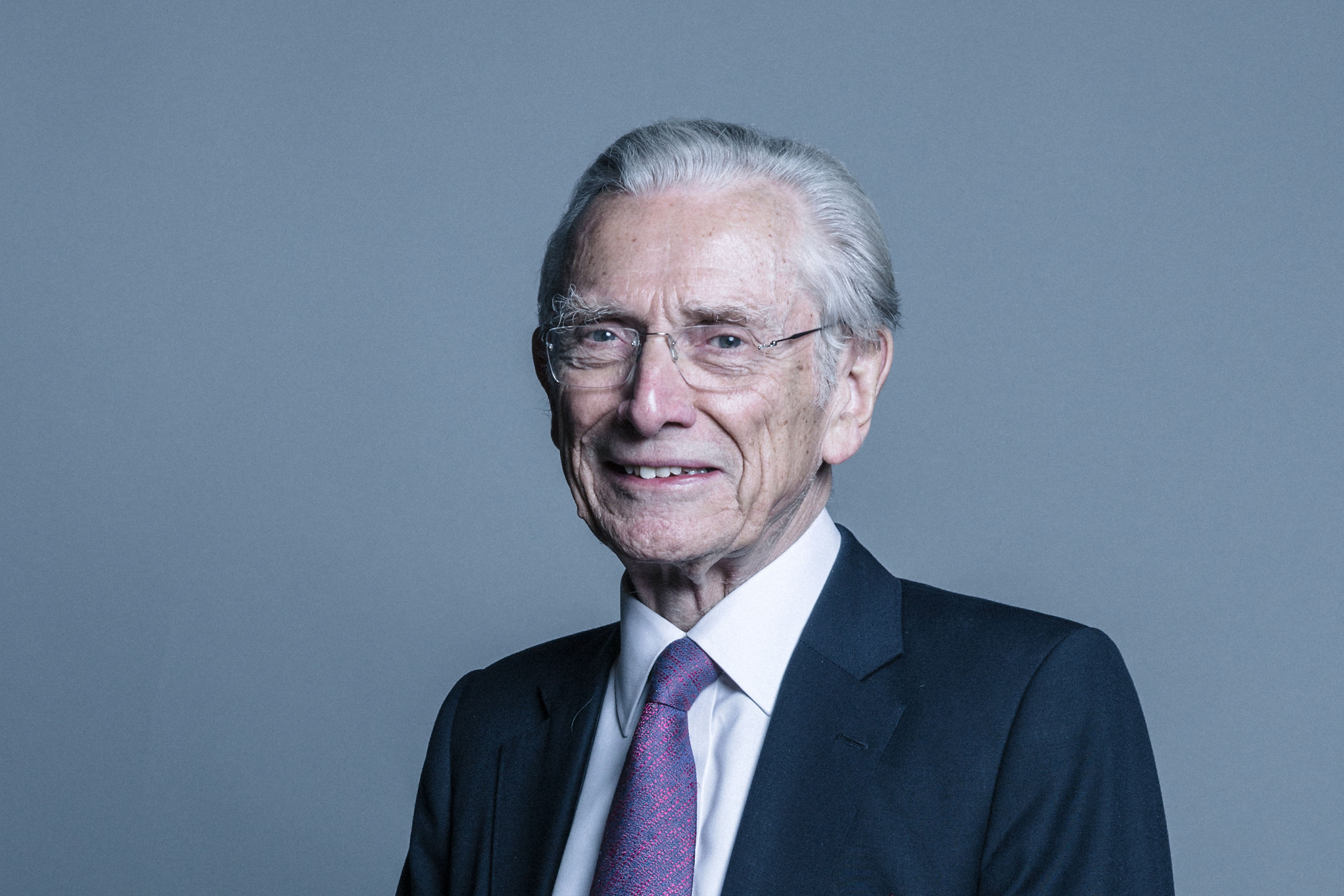
Lord Fowler
(Lord Speaker)

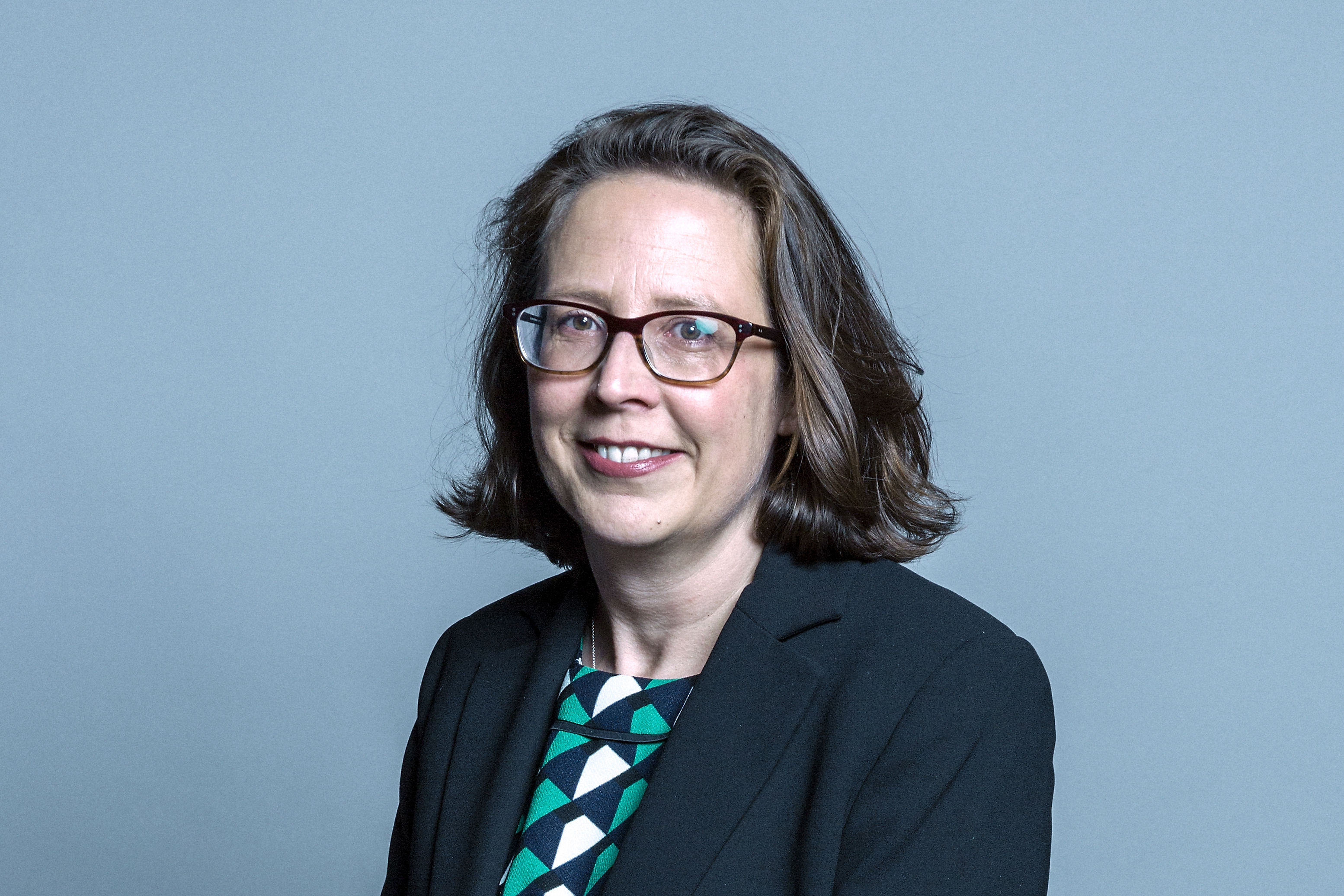
Baroness Evans of Bowes Park
(Leader of the House of Lords, Conservative)

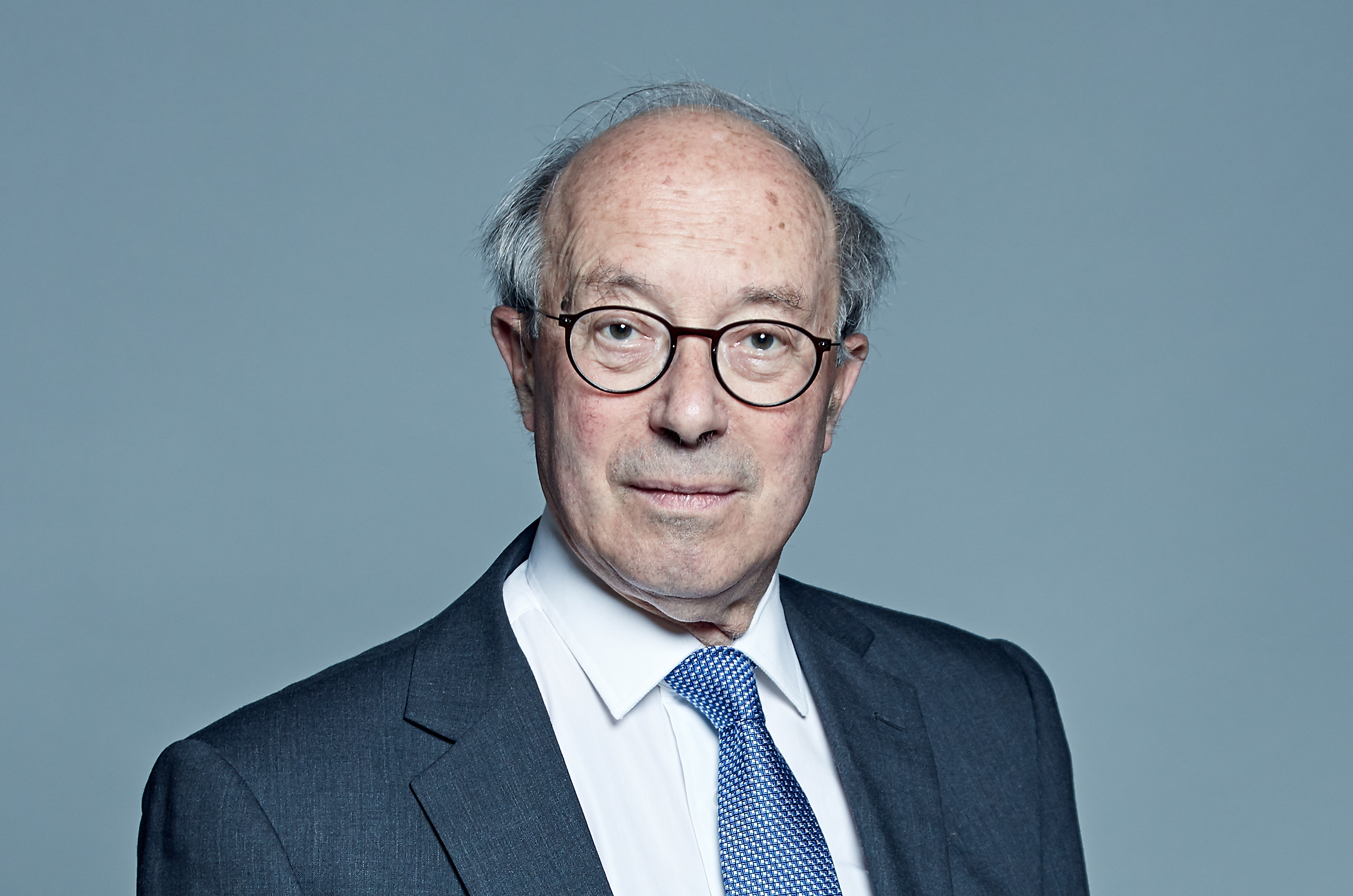
Lord Hope of Craighead
(Crossbench)

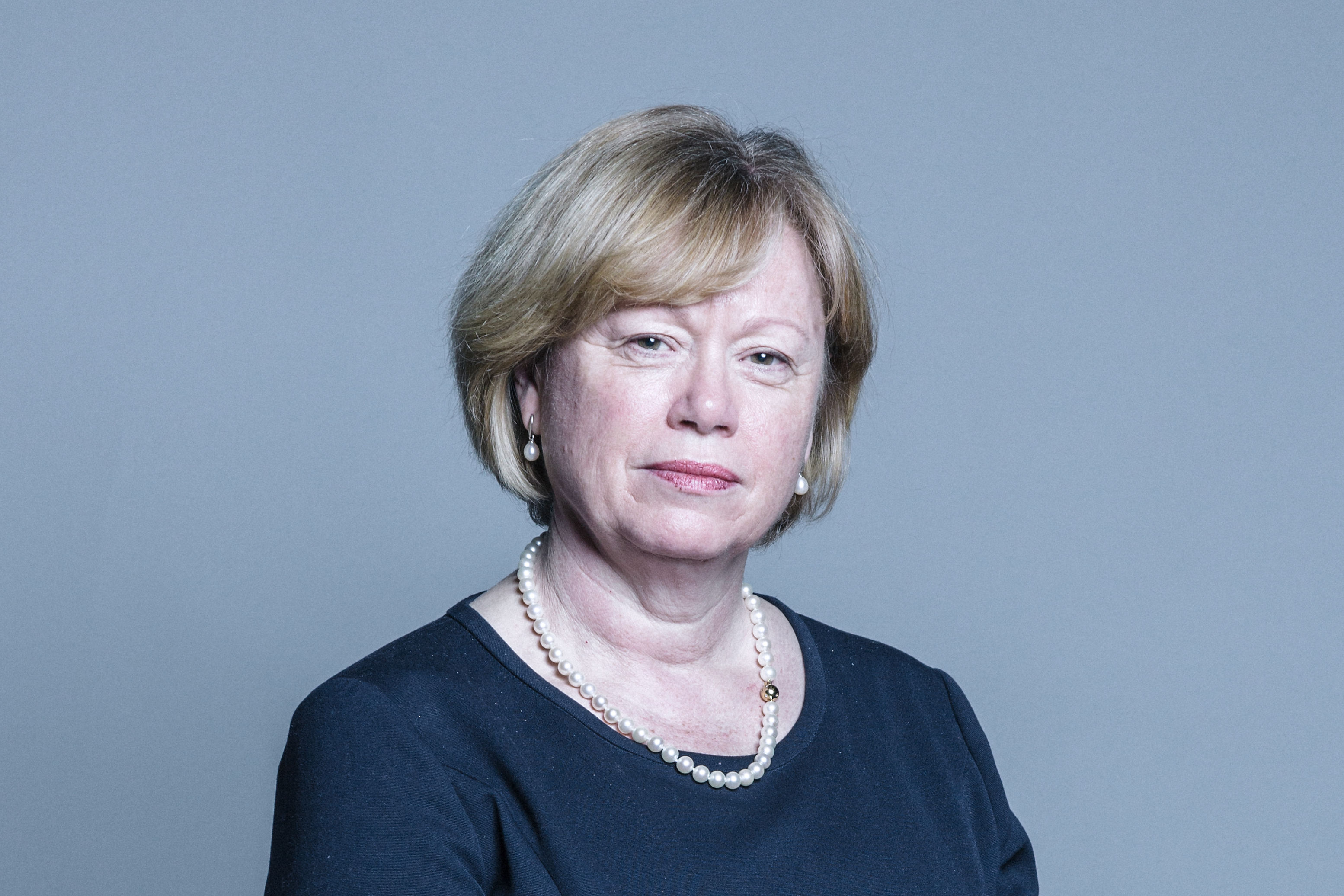
Baroness Smith of Basildon
(Labour, boycotted)

The ostensible prorogation was said at the time to have brought an end to a parliamentary session that had sat for 341 days. Fifty-two bills had passed into law; this included eight Brexit-related bills, six budgetary bills, and nine bills related to the collapse of the Northern Ireland Executive in 2017. (Note: The fifty-two bills passed by Parliament are the forty-eight government-sponsored bills passed before 4 September, the two backbench Brexit bills, and two government bills that were given Royal Assent on 9 September. (Marshall et al. 2019, House of Commons Journal, 9 September 2019)) At the time it was thought that three bills were carried over into the next session, whereas twelve government bills were not carried over. Notable bills that were said to be dropped as a result of prorogation included a Trade Bill, which was due for "ping-pong" and ineligible to be carried over; a Fisheries Bill; and bills concerned with animal cruelty, divorce, and domestic violence. The supposed prorogation also cancelled a meeting between Johnson and members of the Liaison Committee that was scheduled for 11 September.

== Lower court rulings ==
During the parliamentary recess in August, a group of 78 parliamentarians, led by SNP justice spokeswoman Joanna Cherry and Brexit opponent Jolyon Maugham, made an application for judicial review to the Outer House of Scotland's highest court, the Court of Session in Edinburgh. (Note: Cherry and Maugham's co-litigants were Jo Swinson, Ian Murray, Geraint Davies, Hywel Williams, Heidi Allen, Angela Smith, Peter Hain, Jenny Jones, Janet Royall, Robert Winston, Stewart Wood, Debbie Abrahams, Rushanara Ali, Tonia Antoniazzi, Hannah Bardell, Roberta Blackman-Woods, Ben Bradshaw, Tom Brake, Karen Buck, Ruth Cadbury, Marsha de Cordova, Ronnie Cowan, Neil Coyle, Stella Creasy, Wayne David, Emma Dent Coad, Stephen Doughty, Rosie Duffield, Jonathan Edwards, Paul Farrelly, James Frith, Ruth George, Stephen Gethins, Preet Kaur Gill, Patrick Grady, Kate Green, Lilian Greenwood, John Grogan, Helen Hayes, Wera Hobhouse, Margaret Hodge, Rupa Huq, Ruth Jones, Ged Killen, Peter Kyle, Ben Lake, David Lammy, Clive Lewis, Kerry McCarthy, Stuart McDonald, Anna McMorrin, Carol Monaghan, Madeleine Moon, Layla Moran, Jess Phillips, Lloyd Russell-Moyle, Liz Saville Roberts, Tommy Sheppard, Andy Slaughter, Owen Smith, Chris Stephens, Jo Stevens, Wes Streeting, Paul Sweeney, Gareth Thomas, Alison Thewliss, Stephen Timms, Anna Turley, Catherine West, Matt Western, Martin Whitfield, Philippa Whitford, Paul Williams, Daniel Zeichner, Caroline Lucas, Rosena Allin-Khan and Luciana Berger. ([2019] CSOH 70)) The litigants sought a ruling that prorogation to avoid parliamentary scrutiny would be unconstitutional and unlawful; the hearing was expedited to 6 September.

Immediately after the announcement of prorogation on 28 August, Cherry applied to the court for an interim interdict to prevent prorogation until the case could be heard; on the same day, Gina Miller, who previously defeated the Government on the use of the royal prerogative in R (Miller) v Secretary of State for Exiting the European Union, made an urgent application for judicial review of the use of prerogative powers at the High Court of Justice for England and Wales in London, and victims' rights activist Raymond McCord made an application at the High Court of Northern Ireland in Belfast which alleged breaches of the Good Friday Agreement. On 30 August, Lord Doherty refused the request in the Scottish case for an interdict as he was not satisfied there was a "cogent need" for one.

During the Court of Session hearings on 3 September, the court heard evidence Johnson had approved negotiations with the Palace on 15 August 2019, by way of signing a handwritten note to his special adviser Nikki da Costa and Dominic Cummings, and made comments about the short sitting of parliament in September being a "rigmarole" to show MPs were "earning their crust". Aiden O'Neill, who represented the petitioners at the Court of Session, argued this proved the Government misled the court when they described the issue of prorogation as an academic one. During the proceedings, the Government offered no sworn witness statements which testified to the reasons for prorogation; legal commentator David Allen Green likened the lack of such a statement to Sherlock Holmes's famous quote about "the curious incident of the dog in the night-time".

On 4 September, Doherty ruled in the first instance that the matter was non-justiciable; the case was immediately appealed to the Inner House of the Court of Session. Doherty's opinion was shared by the High Court of Justice, who rejected Miller's case on 6 September as non-justiciable. The High Court of Northern Ireland did not rule on the aspect of prorogation in McCord's case—as the English and Scottish courts had already ruled on the matter—and found the other aspects on his cases non-justiciable on 12 September. On 11 September, the three-judge appellate panel at the Court of Session, consisting of Lords Carloway (Lord President), Brodie, and Drummond Young, unanimously found the prorogation was unlawful. The court found Johnson was motivated by "the improper purpose of stymieing Parliament" and had effectively "misled the Queen", and as a result, declared the royal proclamation as "null and of no effect". To resolve the fundamental differences in the verdicts from England and Scotland's senior courts, both the Miller and Cherry cases were appealed to the Supreme Court.

== Political events during prorogation ==
After the Scottish judgement was announced, opposition MPs demanded Parliament be immediately recalled that afternoon and some MPs returned to the empty chamber in protest. At the same time, 10 Downing Street reportedly said the petitioners had "chosen the Scottish courts for a reason". The statement evoked the "Enemies of the People" newspaper headline after the government lost the 2016 Miller case, and the subsequent controversy over then-Lord Chancellor Liz Truss's apparent failure to defend the independence of the judiciary. In response, incumbent Lord Chancellor Robert Buckland QC—who several days previously met Johnson to encourage him to not breach the Article 50 extension law—responded in defence of the judiciary, and the Prime Minister's Office made a subsequent statement which defended the impartiality of the judges. That evening, Kwasi Kwarteng, a senior minister in the government, reopened the controversy on The Andrew Neil Show when he told Neil "many people are saying that the judges are biased".

=== Operation Yellowhammer ===
That same evening, just before the deadline set by Parliament for the Government to comply with the 9 September humble address, the Government published a summary of the Operation Yellowhammer documents, but refused to publish the full documents or release the prorogation correspondence, on the grounds that doing so would violate the legal right to privacy which civil servants enjoy. Refusal to conform with a humble address, which is binding, risks the Government being found in contempt of Parliament for the second time within a year; in the first instance, Parliament voted in December 2018 that legal professional privilege was not a defence to a charge of contempt, in relation to the Government's initial refusal to disclose the full legal advice it received on the withdrawal agreement.

The partial release of the Yellowhammer documents, which detailed possible disruption to the supply of food, fuel, and medicine as a result of a no-deal Brexit, led to renewed calls from the opposition for Parliament on 12 September to be immediately recalled. At the same time, Johnson was scrutinised with regard to the Court of Session finding he had misled the Queen; he denied lying to the Queen and said the High Court of Justice corroborated his belief. On the same day, former Conservative attorney general Dominic Grieve QC MP said that if the Supreme Court found the Government had misled the Queen, it would represent a "very serious" breach of the relationship between the Queen and her prime minister, and Johnson would be forced to "very swiftly" resign as a matter of constitutional principle. On 15 September, the Mail on Sunday reported that Cummings, in a meeting with other governmental special advisors, had suggested a second prorogation if the Supreme Court declared the first prorogation unlawful. The Prime Minister's Office confirmed the accuracy of the story and said the comment was "clearly made as a joke".

=== Impeachment ===
On the same day, Plaid Cymru leader Adam Price said Parliament should impeach Johnson if the Government lost before the Supreme Court and Johnson refused to resign; Liz Saville Roberts, the leader of the party in the House of Commons, had said earlier that week that Johnson should also be impeached if he refused to extend Brexit negotiations and entered discussions with other parties to gather support. Impeachment is an arcane parliamentary procedure which has never been successfully levelled towards a prime minister or a Cabinet minister: (Note: Ministers of the Crown were successfully impeached before the introduction of the Cabinet system; for example, Lord Oxford, the penultimate Lord High Treasurer before the office was put into commission and replaced with the office of prime minister, was impeached by the Whigs in 1713 due to his role in negotiating the Treaty of Utrecht. (Caird 2016)) the last individual to be impeached was Henry Dundas, 1st Viscount Melville in 1806, and the last serious attempt was an unsuccessful 2004 effort by Price and ten other MPs to impeach then-prime minister Tony Blair. Johnson, then a member of the opposition frontbench, was another high-profile supporter of the impeachment motion and wrote an opinion piece in The Daily Telegraph which accused Blair of "treating Parliament and the public with contempt". Historically, individuals who were impeached would be arrested and prosecuted by the Commons in a trial before the Lords in Westminster Hall. Those who were later convicted were sentenced at the liberty of the Commons and had no right to receive the royal prerogative of mercy.

== Supreme Court ==
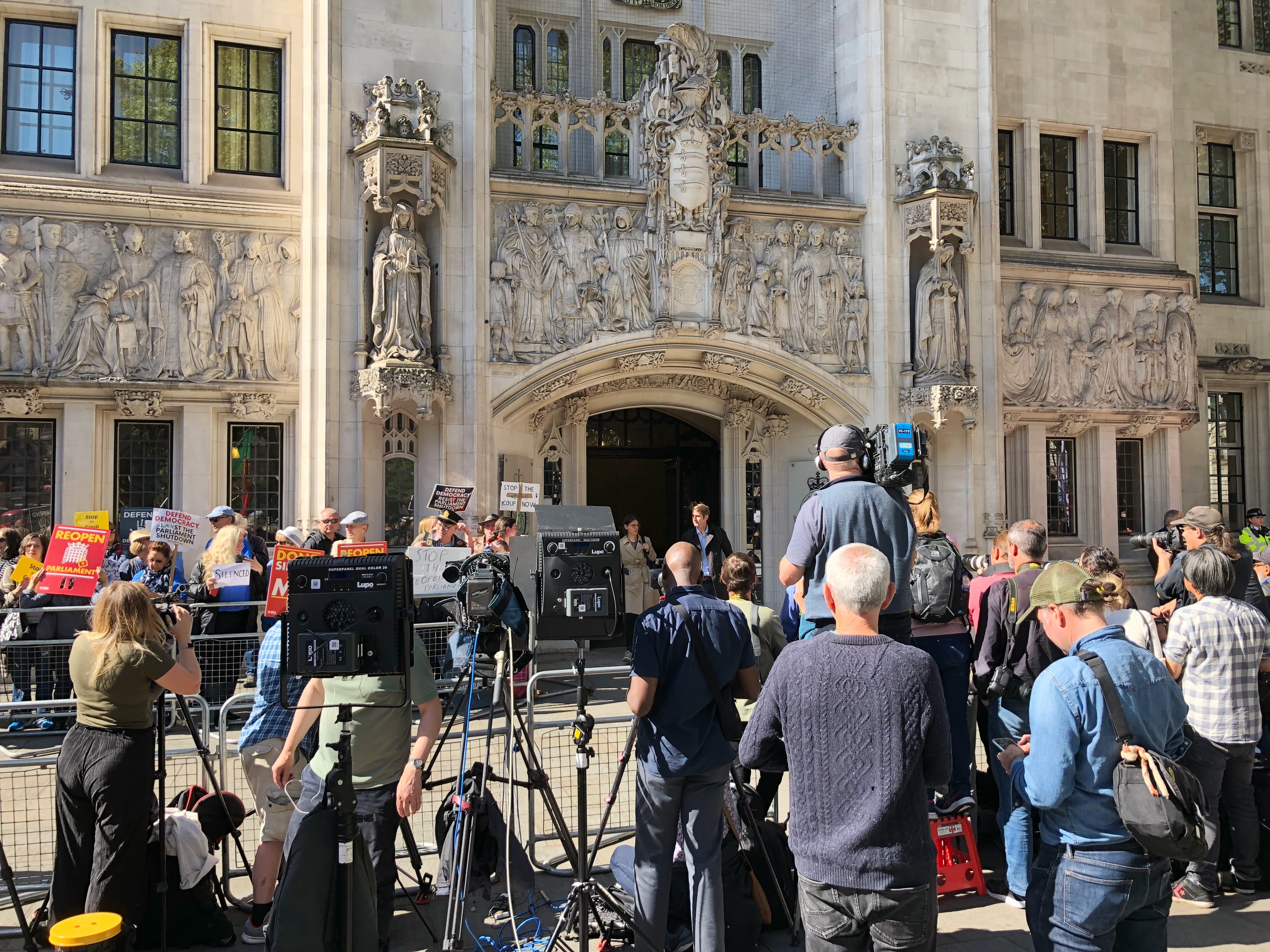
Press and anti-prorogation protesters assemble outside the Supreme Court on 17 September 2019

The Supreme Court of the United Kingdom began a three-day hearing to consider the appeals for both the London and Edinburgh cases on 17 September 2019; McCord, who did not appeal his ruling, was granted leave to make an oral intervention. On the first day of the hearing, which focused on the losers of each lower court case, the Advocate General for Scotland, Lord Keen, argued that the Government was entitled to prorogue Parliament for political purposes and the Court of Session ruled outside its jurisdiction. When asked by the court whether Johnson would prorogue Parliament for a second time, Keen did not answer. Lord Pannick QC, who responded on Miller's behalf, argued that there was "strong evidence" that the purpose of prorogation was to prevent MPs from "frustrating" the Government's Brexit plans, as opposed to a short prorogation for a Queen's Speech that the respondents "had no quarrel with". The second day focused on the victors in each lower court case; the Government, represented by James Eadie QC, argued that in the absence of legislation that regulated the power of prorogation, it was not appropriate for the judiciary to "design a set of rules" to judge prorogation by; O'Neill argued that although it would not be to appropriate to create such rules, it was nevertheless "the province of the courts" to decide whether prorogation was constitutional.

The final day of the hearing saw interventions from other interested parties: former solicitor general Lord Garnier, who responded for former prime minister John Major, argued prorogation was "motivated by a desire to prevent Parliament interfering with the prime minister's policies during that period"; the Scottish Government, who were represented by its Lord Advocate, James Wolffe, argued prorogation had a "profoundly intrusive effect" on Parliament; McCord's advocate Ronan Lavery QC argued prorogation was designed to "run down the clock" to force a no-deal Brexit, which would in turn result in controls on the border with Ireland; and in a written submission, the shadow attorney general, Shami Chakrabarti, said that if the power to prorogue was unchecked, Parliament would be "deprived" of the ability to "perform its constitutional function". The hearing ended with the Government and the petitioners summing up their arguments: Keen re-iterated the argument that the courts were constitutionally "not properly equipped" to decide on matters of high policy; and Pannick requested the court make a declaration that prorogation was unlawful and for Parliament to be recalled as a result.

On 24 September, the Supreme Court ruled unanimously that the prorogation was both justiciable and unlawful, and therefore null and of no effect. The court found that Johnson's advice to the Queen to prorogue Parliament "was outside the powers of the Prime Minister". The court cited the Case of Proclamations (1611), in which the High Court of Justice asserted its power to test the existence of limits of prerogative powers, in answering the question of justiciability; in the case of prorogation, use of the Royal Prerogative must have respect for the conventions of parliamentary sovereignty and democratic accountability. The court ruled that any prorogation would be unlawful "if it has the effect of frustrating or preventing, without reasonable justification, the ability of Parliament to carry out its constitutional functions as a legislature"; if this is the case, there would be no need to rule on whether the motives of the executive were lawful.

The court further ruled that the prorogation of Parliament did have the effect of frustrating Parliament's constitutional functions; the court found that the suspension of Parliament in the prelude to the "fundamental [constitutional] change" of Brexit had an "extreme" effect on the "fundamentals of democracy". The court also found that the Government had not provided a justification for the intended prorogation nor for its length or its effect on the requirement for parliamentary scrutiny of any withdrawal agreement under the terms of the European Union (Withdrawal) Act 2018. As a result, the Court quashed the relevant Order in Council, which meant the effect of the royal proclamation of prorogation had the legal effect of "a blank piece of paper" and reverted the 2017–19 Parliament into being in session.

== Aftermath ==
=== Legal aftermath ===
As with the Scottish ruling, several opposition parliamentarians returned to the chamber immediately after the ruling was issued; those MPs who had surrounded Bercow with makeshift signs during the prorogation ceremony took selfies with their signs edited to reflect the ruling. In a statement on College Green — near Parliament and the Supreme Court's seat in the Middlesex Guildhall — then-Speaker John Bercow announced he had recalled Parliament to sit on the following day from 11:30 am. Prime Minister's Questions was not scheduled for its regular Wednesday midday slot, but Bercow said he would allow urgent questions and applications for emergency debates to be heard.

Bercow opened the first sitting of Parliament, on 25 September 2019, with a statement from the chair: he welcomed MPs back to work and informed the House that consequent to the Supreme Court ruling, the record of the prorogation ceremony would be expunged from the Journal of the House of Commons and corrected to reflect the House as adjourned instead, and that royal assent that had been signified to the Parliamentary Buildings (Restoration and Renewal) Act 2019 during the ceremony would need to be re-signified. The first item of debate was an urgent question by Cherry to the attorney general; she urged Cox to publish the legal advice he gave to Johnson on the subject of prorogation to avoid him being labelled as a scapegoat for the affair. Cox defended the advice he gave to Johnson as being "in good faith", and distanced himself from comments from Conservative MPs which attacked the independence of the judiciary: specifically, Rees-Mogg's description of the ruling as a "constitutional coup".

=== Political consequences ===
On the day of the ruling, Johnson was in New York City to give a speech before the United Nations General Assembly, tentatively scheduled for the morning on 25 September. Johnson said that the government disagreed with the ruling, but would nevertheless abide by it and not seek to prevent Parliament from meeting on the following day. Johnson refused to rule out a second prorogation, and also ruled out his resignation. The Prime Minister's office confirmed that Johnson's speech would be brought forward to the evening of the 24th to allow Johnson to fly back to Britain in time for the start of the following day's parliamentary sitting.

After the ruling, Johnson was criticised by opposition leaders: Jeremy Corbyn, whose Labour Party was in conference in Brighton at the time, brought forward his keynote speech in which he invited Johnson to "consider his position and become the shortest-serving prime minister there's ever been"; SNP leader Nicola Sturgeon demanded Johnson's resignation and urged Parliament to table a motion of no confidence if he did not resign; Liberal Democrat leader Jo Swinson said that Johnson "wasn't fit to be prime minister"; and Brexit Party leader Nigel Farage called prorogation "the worst political decision ever" and called on Johnson to fire his adviser Dominic Cummings for suggesting the plan.

Johnson's first address to Parliament after returning from New York was on the evening of 25 September. In his address, after he stated his opinion that the Supreme Court was "wrong to pronounce on a political question at a time of great national controversy", he re-iterated his call for an early general election and offered time in the parliamentary agenda on 26 September for any party who wished to lay a motion of no confidence against him. When asked by MPs whether he would rule out a second prorogation, he refused, and when asked whether he would abide by the law which mandates him to request an extension to Article 50, he said he would not do so; he had earlier described the law as a "Surrender Bill" or commonly referred to in the media as the Benn Act.

Johnson's speech and conduct was criticised by opposition MPs, who alleged his choice of words were fuelling threats of violence against politicians. Labour MP Paula Sherriff said parliamentarians were routinely receiving death threats using language such as "surrender" and "betrayal", and asked Johnson to moderate his language, especially in the context of the June 2016 murder of Jo Cox. Johnson prompted heckles of "shame" when he responded to Sherriff's comments that he "had never heard so much humbug in [his] life". Sherriff's request for moderated language was repeated by Cox's constituency successor Tracy Brabin; Johnson declined and elicited further anger when he told Brabin that the best way to "honour the memory" of Cox would be to "get Brexit done".

On 26 September, Bercow made another statement from the chair that he was considering an application by Kenneth Clarke and Harriet Harman—the longest serving male and female MPs respectively—for a Speaker's Conference to be held to discuss the lack of decorum in contemporary British political culture. Bercow also lambasted the tone of the previous night's debates as the worst he had seen in Parliament since his election as an MP in 1997. Several hours after asking an urgent question on political decorum, Labour MP Jess Phillips told LBC that a man had been arrested on suspicion of a public order offence outside her Birmingham Yardley constituency office; Phillips alleged the man had been attempting to break into the office whilst accusing her of fascism. In an interview with the BBC, Johnson said he deplored any threats of violence, but defended his description of the Article 50 extension law as a "Surrender Bill" and declined requests to apologise.

Later that day, a Government motion for the House of Commons to go into recess for the duration of the Conservative Party conference in Manchester was rejected 289–306; the defeat represented the seventh successive Government defeat in the House of Commons and continued Johnson's record of not winning a single division since taking office. As a result, the Government scheduled relatively uncontroversial matters for debate for the three days Parliament sat during the conference; this included the cross-party domestic violence bill, which was scheduled for the Wednesday 2 October session. The lack of a conference recess meant that Prime Minister's Questions clashed with the leader's keynote speech at the Conservative conference; Johnson delivered his conference keynote whilst Prime Minister's Questions was deputised by Dominic Raab who faced questions from then Shadow Home Secretary Diane Abbott making her the first black MP to stand at a dispatch box for PMQs.

On 2 October, the Government announced fresh plans to prorogue Parliament for six days, from Tuesday 8 October to Monday 14 October. Proroguing on a Tuesday meant that Johnson would miss Prime Minister's Questions for the third successive Wednesday; at that point his only scheduled question time since becoming prime minister was on 4 September, although Johnson had faced over eight hours of questions in response to ad hoc ministerial statements. The second prorogation ceremony took place on the evening of 8 October, and was attended by 30 MPs who followed Black Rod Sarah Clarke from the Commons to the Lords. The ceremony passed without the protests that had marked the previous attempt at prorogation with opposition leaders in the House of Lords also participating in the proceedings, though Lord Judge was substituted for Lord Hope of Craighead having in the interim succeeded him as crossbench convenor.

=== 2019 general election and Brexit ===
The manifesto published by the Conservative Party prior to the 2019 general election, held in December of that year, stated that a newly elected Conservative government would review the broader constitutional relationship between Parliament and the courts, as well as the function of the Royal Prerogative itself, the basis on which prorogation is made. In the election, they won an 80-seat majority and therefore formed the next government. The proposed Dissolution and Calling of Parliament Bill emphasised the non-justiciability of the revived prerogative powers, prevented courts from making certain rulings in relation to a Government's power to dissolve Parliament. It received royal assent over two years later, on 24 March 2022.

== See also ==
- 1975 Australian constitutional crisis
- 2008–09 Canadian parliamentary dispute
- 2010 Canada anti-prorogation protests
- 2019 in the United Kingdom
- Brexit negotiations in 2019
- Premiership of Boris Johnson
