= European Union (Withdrawal) (No. 2) Act 2019 =

Act of the UK Parliament

- Act of Parliament
- Parliament of the United Kingdom
- Long title: An Act to make further provision in connection with the period for negotiations for withdrawing from the European Union.
- Citation: 2019 c. 26
- Introduced by: Hilary Benn (Commons); Lord Rooker (Lords)
- Territorial extent: England and Wales, Scotland and Northern Ireland

Dates
- Royal assent: 9 September 2019
- Commencement: 9 September 2019
- Repealed: 23 January 2020
Other legislation
Repealed by	European Union (Withdrawal Agreement) Act 2020
Relates to	European Union (Notification of Withdrawal) Act 2017 European Union (Withdrawal) Act 2018 European Union (Withdrawal) Act 2019

Status: Repealed

History of passage through Parliament

Text of statute as originally enacted

The European Union (Withdrawal) (No. 2) Act 2019, informally referred to as the Benn Act, was an act of the Parliament of the United Kingdom that required the prime minister of the UK to seek an extension to the Brexit withdrawal date—then scheduled for 31 October 2019—in certain circumstances. The main provisions of the Act were triggered if the House of Commons did not give its consent to either a withdrawal agreement or leaving without a deal by 19 October 2019. The Act proposed a new withdrawal date of 31 January 2020, which the Prime Minister accepted if the proposal was accepted by the European Council.

The Act also contained provisions that detailed the course of action if an alternative date were proposed by the European Council, required regular reports on the progress of any negotiations between the EU and the UK, and set out the format of the letter the Prime Minister was required to send to the President of the European Council should he be required to seek an extension. It also removed the discretion of the Prime Minister not to amend exit day in response to an extension. The Act was given royal assent on 9 September 2019 and commenced the same day.

The bill was proposed by opposition and backbench MPs after Boris Johnson became prime minister. It was passed after they took control of the parliamentary agenda in the run-up to the controversial—and later ruled void—prorogation of Parliament. The Government fiercely opposed the bill, and Boris Johnson and other eurosceptics repeatedly referred to the Act as the "Surrender Act". The Government had been suspected of examining options on how to nullify the Act's effect. On 19 October, Johnson sent the letter to the president of the European Council Donald Tusk requesting an extension to the Brexit withdrawal date per the Act. This was formally approved on 28 October. On 30 October 2019, the day named as "exit day" in UK legislation was accordingly changed to 31 January 2020 at 11.00 p.m.

The Act was repealed on 23 January 2020 by the European Union (Withdrawal Agreement) Act 2020.

== Background ==
In June 2016, the United Kingdom voted in a referendum to leave the European Union by a margin of 52% to 48%. Nine months later, on 29 March 2017, the Government, by then led by Theresa May, invoked Article 50 of the Treaty on European Union, after Parliament voted to approve the European Union (Notification of Withdrawal) Act 2017 by a vote of 498 to 114. After a General Election in June 2017, May's Conservative Party lost their majority, but were supported by the Democratic Unionist Party to enact their legislative agenda.

The Brexit withdrawal agreement was published in November 2018, and was rejected three times by Parliament in early 2019. Facing the prospect of leaving the EU without a deal, Parliament voted to also reject a "no deal" scenario and to request an extension to the Article 50 process with the European Union (Withdrawal) Act 2019. The Government and the European Council subsequently agreed to delay Brexit, until 12 April 2019 in the first instance, and then to 31 October 2019.

Due to opposition from her own party to her handling of Brexit, May resigned as Leader of the Conservative Party on 7 June 2019 and prime minister on 24 July 2019. She was succeeded after the following leadership election as leader and prime minister by Boris Johnson, who pledged, "do or die", to withdraw the UK from the EU on 31 October, with or without a deal.

On 28 August 2019, Johnson advised Queen Elizabeth II to prorogue Parliament from the second week of September 2019 until 14 October 2019, days before a scheduled summit of the European Council on 17 October. The prorogation reduced the amount of time that was available to Parliament to scrutinise Government business, and was criticised outwith the government as a tactic to force a "no deal" Brexit without the consent of Parliament: in particular the Speaker of the House of Commons John Bercow called prorogation in the circumstances a "constitutional outrage"; and protestors at an impromptu demonstration saw the government as effecting a coup d'état or self-coup.

== Contents of the Act ==
The Act contained four substantive sections and a schedule that contained the form of a letter to request an extension of the negotiating period:

- Section 1 obliged the Prime Minister to request an extension to the Article 50 negotiating period for the purpose of negotiating a withdrawal agreement, unless the House of Commons has passed a motion which either approved a withdrawal agreement or approves departure without a deal, and the House of Lords had debated the same motion. If such a motion was not approved, the Prime Minister was obliged to make the request no later than 19 October 2019.
- Section 2 obliged the Government to publish a progress report on negotiations before 30 November 2019, and if rejected or amended, publish a second report which detailed its plans for further negotiations. Section 2 also obliged the Government to make progress reports every four weeks from 7 February 2020 unless directed otherwise.
- Section 3 obliged the Prime Minister to accept an extension to 31 January 2020, and allowed the Prime Minister to either accept an offer or ask the House of Commons to accept an offer of any other date.
- Section 4 amended legislation to ensure the date of departure is synchronised with European law.
- The Schedule specified the required layout and wording of the letter that requests the extension.

== Legislative history ==
On 3 September 2019, Conservative MP Oliver Letwin tabled a motion that would allow the House of Commons to undertake proceedings on the second reading, committee stage, consideration and third reading of a backbench Brexit bill on the following day. The motion was passed with a majority of 27. A total of 21 Conservative MPs voted in favour of the motion and against the Government; this led to the whip being withdrawn from the rebels, and pushed the government further away from a majority (after Conservative MP Phillip Lee lost the government its working majority of 1 earlier in the day by defecting to the Liberal Democrats). The rebels included the Father of the House and former Chancellor of the Exchequer, Ken Clarke, eight other Cabinet ministers under Cameron and May, and Winston Churchill's grandson, Nicholas Soames. (Note: The full list of MPs who were suspended from the Conservative whip were: Guto Bebb, Richard Benyon, Steve Brine, Alistair Burt, Greg Clark, Kenneth Clarke, David Gauke, Justine Greening, Dominic Grieve, Sam Gyimah, Philip Hammond, Stephen Hammond, Richard Harrington, Margot James, Oliver Letwin, Anne Milton, Caroline Nokes, Antoinette Sandbach, Nicholas Soames, Rory Stewart, and Ed Vaizey. (Sandford & Crowcroft 2019)) In response to the suspension of the rebel MPs, Jo Johnson—Boris's brother—and Amber Rudd resigned from the Cabinet in protest shortly after.

The legislation was introduced to the House of Commons by Labour MP Hilary Benn as the European Union (Withdrawal) (No. 6) Bill on the following day. The Government made clear its opposition to the bill from the beginning, and said that, were it to pass through the House of Commons, the prime minister, Boris Johnson, would immediately bring forward a motion under the Fixed-term Parliaments Act for a general election. The bill passed second reading by 329 votes to 300. The bill was amended once at the committee stage, by a Stephen Kinnock amendment that would allow the Withdrawal Agreement to be discussed again, which passed as there were not any 'no' tellers provided for the division. The bill passed its third reading on the same day, by 327 votes to 299.

The bill then moved to the House of Lords on the same day, and there were suggestions that the bill could be filibustered; unlike in the House of Commons, the House of Lords typically does not restrict the content of debates. The Shadow Leader of the House of Lords, Baroness Angela Smith, tabled a guillotine motion that would allow the bill to clear the Lords by 5 pm on Friday 6 September; Conservative peers tabled 102 amendments to the guillotine motion in an attempt to prioritise other parliamentary business over the bill. By 1:30 am on 5 September, the Government announced it would discontinue the filibuster and allow the bill to return to the House of Commons, if amended by the House of Lords, for the 9 September sitting. The bill passed second reading without a division on 5 September, and passed the committee, report, and third reading stages unamended on 6 September. The bill received royal assent and became law on 9 September 2019, several hours before Parliament was suspended.

== Reactions ==
=== Political response ===
In response to the bill's passage on 4 September, the Government immediately brought a motion for an early general election under the terms of the Fixed-term Parliaments Act 2011. The motion failed 298–56, short of the two-thirds supermajority of all MPs (434) needed to trigger an election; opposition parties either voted against or abstained on the motion as they believed the intention of the government was to ensure departure from the EU without a deal while Parliament was dissolved for such an election. On 9 September, a second attempt at triggering an early election failed 293–46.

On 5 September, at a press conference at a police training school in Wakefield, West Yorkshire, Johnson said he would rather be "dead in a ditch" than request an extension to Article 50. Johnson was criticised by the Police Federation of England and Wales, West Yorkshire Police and Crime Commissioner Mark Burns-Williamson and Chair of the Home Affairs Select Committee Yvette Cooper among others for using the speech for partisan purposes, thus bringing into question the impartiality of the police. In a press release on 6 September, Chief Constable of West Yorkshire Police, John Robins, stated the speech was intended to announce new policing policy and the force was not given prior notice of the speech being expanded to include other matters. In response to continuing concerns of the possibility of Johnson breaking the law, Secretary of State for Justice Robert Buckland stated on 8 September he had discussions with Johnson over the importance of the rule of law—which Buckland, as Lord Chancellor, has a legal obligation to uphold—but denied rumours he would resign from the Cabinet if Johnson did break the law.

By 9 September, reports surfaced that the Government would seek to bypass the law by sending a request for an extension as required by the Act alongside another letter that declared the request invalid; former Supreme Court justice Lord Sumption described such an act, in the face of judicial action, as a possible contempt of court that would risk the resignations of the law officers in his Cabinet, while former Director of Public Prosecutions Ken Macdonald said Johnson was risking imprisonment for the same offence. In response, Leader of the Opposition Jeremy Corbyn tabled an emergency motion for debate on that day on the importance of the rule of law; the motion passed without a vote in a symbolic victory for the opposition, although the Government stated in the debate that their policy would be to not request an extension, despite the legal requirement to do so. Polling undertaken by YouGov over the weekend of 6–8 September 2019 indicated 50% of respondents disapproved and 28% of respondents approved of the proposition of Johnson breaching the law; Leave (52% in favour, 28% opposed) and Conservative (50%–34%) voters were most supportive whereas Remain (8%–77%), Liberal Democrat (11%–76%) and Labour (14%–69%) were the most opposed.

On the same day, Liz Saville Roberts, the leader of Plaid Cymru in the House of Commons, announced she had entered discussions with other parties to gather support for impeachment if Johnson refused to obey the law. Impeachment is an arcane parliamentary procedure that has never been successfully levelled towards a prime minister or a Cabinet Minister; the last individual to be impeached was Henry Dundas, 1st Viscount Melville for his actions as Treasurer of the Navy in 1806, though he was acquitted. Plaid Cymru had spearheaded the last serious impeachment attempt, an unsuccessful 2004 effort to indict then-Prime Minister Tony Blair for lying to Parliament regarding the Iraq War. Johnson, then a member of the opposition frontbench, was another high-profile supporter of the effort to impeach Blair and wrote a column in The Daily Telegraph that accused him of "treating Parliament and the public with contempt".

On 26 September 2019, former Prime Minister John Major said in a speech to the Centre for European Reform that he "feared" that Johnson would use an Order of Council to nullify the Act until after 31 October. Orders of Council, in contrast to the similarly named Orders in Council, are decisions taken by the Privy Council alone, as opposed to with the consent of the monarch; such orders are typically made for technical reasons—such as regulating the medical profession—and not to disapply statute law. The option to use Orders of Council would likely utilise provisions of the Civil Contingencies Act 2004 that allow for the Government, in times of emergency, to temporarily disapply laws. The following afternoon, 10 Downing Street denied Johnson would use Orders of Council to bypass the Act, but reiterated the Government's commitment to leaving the EU on 31 October.

=== Court cases ===
On 12 September 2019, an application was made to the Court of Session in Scotland by Jo Maugham QC and Joanna Cherry QC MP to require the Prime Minister to sign the extension letter in the event no withdrawal agreement could be agreed in time. The applicants hoped that the Court's power of nobile officium, unique among UK courts, would enable it to send the extension letter on Johnson's behalf if he declined to do so. Cherry, the justice spokeswoman for the Scottish National Party, and Maugham had successfully brought a case before the Court of Session to challenge Johnson's prorogation of Parliament, which had delivered a judgment that declared it unlawful on the previous day.

On 24 September 2019, the Supreme Court ruled in R (Miller) v The Prime Minister and Cherry v Advocate General for Scotland that the prorogation was unlawful and void; as a response, Parliament was recalled to sit the following day. That morning, the Attorney General, Geoffrey Cox, said there was "no question of this government not obeying the law" with regard to the Act, and that the Government believed what legal obligations the Act contained was an open question.

On 7 October 2019, the Cherry/Maugham petition to the Court of Session to force Johnson to comply with the Act was denied. The Outer House of the Court of Session ruled that there was no "reasonable apprehension of a breach of statutory duty" and that, in the light of averments before the Court that the Government would comply with the act, there was no need for a coercive order to enforce compliance. On 9 October, the Inner House of the Court of Session decided that a final ruling on the petition would not be made until 21 October—two days after the deadline in the Act for the Prime Minister to request an extension.

Separately in the Inner House, the campaigners requested a ruling that, if such a letter came to be required and Johnson failed to write it, the Court would write the letter itself using nobile officium powers.

Following a special sitting of Parliament on Saturday 19 October, the Benn Act required the prime minister immediately to write to the European Council with a request for an extension of withdrawal until 31 January 2020. Prime minister Boris Johnson sent two letters to the president of the European Council, Donald Tusk: one, which was stated to be from the UK prime minister but was not signed, referred to the requirements of the Benn Act and requested an extension until 31 January 2020; the other, signed personally by Johnson and copied to all Council members, stated that it was his own belief that a delay would be a mistake and requested support from the president and Council members for his continuing efforts to ensure withdrawal without an extension. The letters were delivered by the British permanent representative in Brussels, together with a cover note signed by himself which affirmed that the first letter complied with the Benn Act.

On 21 October, the case resumed in the Inner House. The campaigners conceded that Johnson had fulfilled the requirement of the Act that he write seeking an extension, but contended that his second letter negated the first. The Court refused the government's request to dismiss the case, deciding that it should remain before the Court "until it is clear that the obligations under [the Benn Act] have been complied with in full". On 7 October, government lawyers had undertaken to the Outer House that Johnson would abide by all requirements of the Act. These included responding to the EU's reaction to his letter. Any breach of that undertaking could have placed Johnson in contempt of the Court.

=== Parliamentary language debate ===
The Prime Minister's description of the law as a "Surrender Act" in Parliament was criticised by Dewsbury MP Paula Sherriff, who said his language was unnecessarily inflammatory and said that opposition politicians routinely received death threats that similarly called the law a "Surrender Act" and accused MPs of "betrayal" and that Johnson should moderate his language; Johnson received heckles of "shame" when he described Sherriff's comments as "humbug". Tracy Brabin, the then MP for the neighbouring constituency of Batley and Spen, also asked Johnson for moderation to prevent violence against MPs; her predecessor, Jo Cox, was murdered in June 2016 by a neo-Nazi. Johnson declined and elicited further outrage from some MPs when he said that "the best way to honour [Cox's] memory" was "to get Brexit done".

== Outcome ==
On 19 October 2019, a special Saturday sitting of Parliament was held to debate a revised withdrawal agreement. Prime minister Boris Johnson moved approval of that agreement. However in a surprising and unexpected counter move Parliament instead passed, by 322 to 306, Sir Oliver Letwin's amendment to the motion, to delay consideration of the agreement until the legislation to implement it has been passed; the motion was then carried as amended, implementing Letwin's delay. This delay activated the Act, requiring the prime minister immediately to write to the European Council with a request for an extension of withdrawal until 31 January 2020.

Later on that day, prime minister Johnson sent two letters to the president of the European Council, Donald Tusk: one, which was stated to be from the UK prime minister but was not signed, referred to the requirements of the Act and requested an extension until 31 January 2020; the other, signed personally by Johnson and copied to all Council members, stated that it was his own belief that a delay would be a mistake and requested support from the president and Council members for his continuing efforts to ensure withdrawal without an extension. The letters were delivered by the British permanent representative in Brussels, together with a cover note signed by himself which affirmed that the first letter complied with the Act.

On 22 October, the legislation to implement the withdrawal agreement—the EU (Withdrawal Agreement) Bill—was approved in the Commons (second reading) by 329 votes to 299. However, the accompanying "programme motion", to get all stages of the bill completed in three days and thus before 31 October, was defeated by 322 votes to 308 after MPs objected that this would not allow time for adequate consideration.

On 28 October, the extension of the Brexit withdrawal date to 31 January 2020 was formally approved between the prime minister and the EU. He called for a general election on 12 December, which MPs voted for on 29 October, and Johnson went on to win an 80-seat majority.

The UK left the European Union on 31 January 2020, with a transitional arrangement aligning the UK to EU rules ending on 31 December that year. A trade deal, the EU–UK Trade and Cooperation Agreement, setting the terms of the future relationship between the EU and UK was agreed on 24 December 2020, subject to approval by national legislatures.

== See also ==
- Padfield v Minister of Agriculture, a 1968 House of Lords case which set the precedent that it is impermissible for government officers to seek to frustrate statutory law.
