= 2019 suspension of rebel Conservative MPs =

UK political controversy

On 3 September 2019, the British Conservative Party withdrew the whip from 21 of its MPs who supported an emergency motion to allow the House of Commons to undertake proceedings on the European Union (Withdrawal) (No. 6) Bill on 4 September. In the hours after the vote, the Chief Whip Mark Spencer informed the rebel MPs that they were no longer entitled to sit as Conservatives. This led to the loss of the Conservative/DUP majority in the Commons.

The suspended MPs included two former Chancellors of the Exchequer (Philip Hammond and the Father of the House, Kenneth Clarke), seven other former Cabinet members (Greg Clark, David Gauke, Justine Greening, Dominic Grieve, Oliver Letwin, Caroline Nokes, and Rory Stewart), and 12 others including Nicholas Soames, grandson of Winston Churchill.

On 29 October 2019, 10 of the suspended MPs had the whip restored; of these, six stood down at the December 2019 election, while four contested it as Conservative candidates, all retaining their seats. Of the 11 who remained suspended, six declined to stand at the election, while five stood as independents or Liberal Democrats; all five lost their seats. As of 2024, Caroline Nokes is the only MP who still has her seat, while five sit in the House of Lords.

The suspension of these MPs bore resemblance to the Maastricht Rebels who had the Conservative whip removed by the governing Conservative Party during the ratification of the Maastricht Treaty in the early 1990s.

== Background ==
In April 2019, Speaker of the House of Commons John Bercow allowed Sir Oliver Letwin to table a motion that would allow MPs to undertake proceedings on the second reading, committee, and third reading of the European Union (Withdrawal) (No. 5) Bill (also known as the Cooper–Letwin Bill) in one day. The motion was passed by one vote. Subsequently, the bill was passed as the European Union (Withdrawal) Act 2019.

Several of the MPs had voted for Theresa May's ultimately unsuccessful Withdrawal Agreement, and subsequently continued to oppose a "no deal" Brexit scenario. They became known in the media as the "Gaukeward Squad" after their informal leader David Gauke.

In September 2019, Bercow again permitted Letwin to introduce a motion under Standing Order No. 24 (SO No. 24) to take control of parliamentary business away from the government, this time to allow for the passage of the European Union (Withdrawal) (No. 6) Bill, to be introduced by Hilary Benn on the following day. In anticipation of the vote, the government whips' office announced that voting in favour of Letwin's motion would effectively be "destroying the government's negotiating position and handing control of parliament to Jeremy Corbyn." On that basis, those Conservative MPs supporting the motion would have the whip withdrawn.

== Rebel MPs ==
A total of 21 Conservative MPs voted for the motion:

| Portrait | MP | Constituency | Parliamentary party status | 2019 general election |
|---|---|---|---|---|
| | Guto Bebb | Aberconwy | | did not stand |
| | Richard Benyon | Newbury | whip restored on 29 October 2019 | did not stand; made a peer in the 2020 Special Honours as Baron Benyon. |
| | Steve Brine | Winchester | whip restored on 29 October 2019 | stood as a Conservative; retained seat with a much reduced majority of 985 over the Liberal Democrats. |
| | Alistair Burt | North East Bedfordshire | whip restored on 29 October 2019 | did not stand |
| | Greg Clark | Tunbridge Wells | whip restored on 29 October 2019 | stood as a Conservative; retained seat |
| | Kenneth Clarke | Rushcliffe | | did not stand; made a peer in the 2019 Dissolution Honours as Baron Clarke of Nottingham. |
| | David Gauke | South West Hertfordshire | | stood as an independent; lost seat to Conservatives, coming second. Rejoined Conservatives in 2024. |
| | Justine Greening | Putney | | did not stand; seat gained by Labour, their only gain from the Conservatives at the election. |
| | Dominic Grieve | Beaconsfield | | stood as an independent; lost seat to Conservatives, coming second. |
| | Sam Gyimah | East Surrey | joined Liberal Democrats on 14 September 2019 | stood as a Liberal Democrat in Kensington; lost seat to Conservatives, coming third behind Labour. |
| | Philip Hammond | Runnymede and Weybridge | | did not stand. ; made a peer in the 2019 Dissolution Honours as Baron Hammond of Runnymede and rejoined the Conservatives on 30 September 2020. |
| | Stephen Hammond | Wimbledon | whip restored on 29 October 2019 | stood as a Conservative; retained seat with a much reduced majority of 628 over the Liberal Democrats. |
| | Richard Harrington | Watford | whip restored on 29 October 2019 | did not stand; later made a peer in the 2022 Special Honours as Lord Harrington of Watford. |
| | Margot James | Stourbridge | whip restored on 29 October 2019 | did not stand |
| | Sir Oliver Letwin | West Dorset | | did not stand |
| | Anne Milton | Guildford | | stood as an independent; lost seat to Conservatives, coming fourth behind the Liberal Democrat and Labour candidates. |
| | Caroline Nokes | Romsey and Southampton North | whip restored on 29 October 2019 | stood as a Conservative; retained seat |
| | Antoinette Sandbach | Eddisbury | joined Liberal Democrats on 31 October 2019 | stood as a Liberal Democrat; lost seat to Conservatives, coming third behind Labour. |
| | Sir Nicholas Soames | Mid Sussex | whip restored on 29 October 2019 | did not stand later made a peer in the 2022 Special Honours as Baron Soames of Fletching. |
| | Rory Stewart | Penrith and The Border | | did not stand |
| | Ed Vaizey | Wantage | whip restored on 29 October 2019 | did not stand; made a peer in the 2019 Dissolution Honours as Baron Vaizey of Didcot. |

== Aftermath ==
On 5 September, the Universities Minister Jo Johnson, who is also the Prime Minister Boris Johnson's younger brother, resigned from the Cabinet and stood down as an MP at the subsequent general election. The Daily Telegraph reported that Johnson's decision had been triggered by the suspension of Conservative MPs two days prior.

Two days later, the Work and Pensions Secretary Amber Rudd resigned from the Cabinet and surrendered the Conservative whip in Parliament in protest at Boris Johnson's policy on Brexit and the treatment of the 21 rebel MPs.

On 9 September, the bill was passed as the European Union (Withdrawal) (No. 2) Act 2019.

On 14 September, former Conservative leadership contender Sam Gyimah, who was one of the 21, joined the Liberal Democrats. On 4 October, former Cabinet minister and former Conservative leadership contender Rory Stewart resigned from the Conservative Party, in order to stand as an independent candidate for Mayor of London.

On 29 October, 10 of the MPs suspended from the party in September had the whip restored after meeting Boris Johnson. They were Alistair Burt, Caroline Nokes, Greg Clark, Sir Nicholas Soames, Ed Vaizey, Margot James, Richard Benyon, Stephen Hammond, Steve Brine and Richard Harrington.

On 31 October, Antoinette Sandbach joined the Liberal Democrats. On 5 November, Philip Hammond stood down as an MP at the forthcoming general election.

== See also ==
- List of elected British politicians who have changed party affiliation
- Maastricht Rebels
