= Brynle Williams =

Welsh politician (1949–2011)

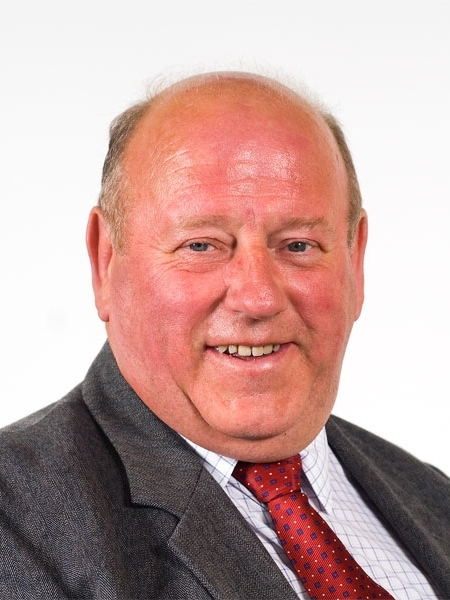
- Official portrait, 2007

Member of the Welsh Assembly for North Wales
- In office 1 May 2003 – 1 April 2011
- Preceded by: Peter Rogers
- Succeeded by: Antoinette Sandbach

Shadow Minister for Rural Affairs
- In office 11 July 2007 – 1 April 2011
- Leader: Nick Bourne
- Preceded by: Elin Jones
- Succeeded by: Antoinette Sandbach

Personal details
- Born: 9 January 1949 Cilcain, Wales
- Died: 1 April 2011 (aged 62)
- Resting place: Cilcain, Mold
- Party: Conservative
- Spouse: Mary Williams

Brynle Williams (9 January 1949 – 1 April 2011) was a Welsh Conservative politician who was the Shadow Minister for Rural Affairs from 2007 to 2011, and a Member of the Welsh Assembly (AM) for the North Wales Region from 2007 to his death in 2011. Williams, who was a farmer from North Wales, was a colourful political figure who was respected for his straight talking and campaigning on rural issues; although privately he admitted he never saw himself as a politician.

Williams rise to prominence began in 1997–98 when he joined protesters blockading the Port of Holyhead on Anglesey over the importation of Irish beef. He later became a leader in the UK fuel protests in 2000.

== Political career ==
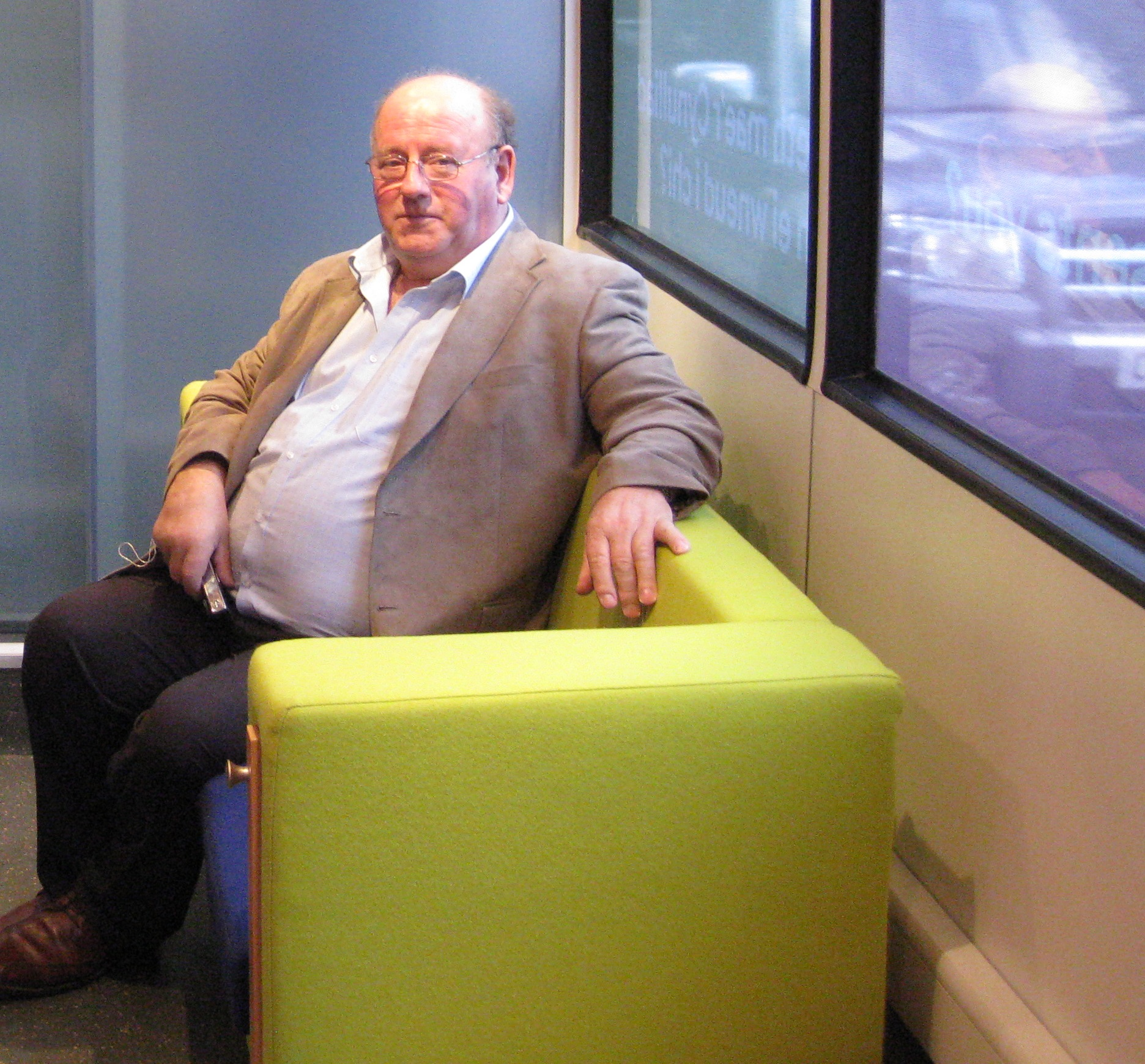
Williams in 2009

Williams was first elected to the Welsh Assembly on 1 May 2003 and was re-elected in 2007; serving until his death in 2011. He was Shadow Minister for Rural Affairs from 14 July 2007 and sat on the Sustainability, Rural Development, and Standards committees.

Williams had also been the Conservative spokesman for Environment, Planning and Countryside and Local Government in the Second Assembly (2003–07), during which time he was Chair of the North Wales Regional Committee. During his time in the assembly he carved out a role as a champion of farming and rural affairs.

Following the news of his death, First Minister and Welsh Labour leader, Carwyn Jones described Williams as a "colourful" but "tough battler". Welsh Conservative leader Nick Bourne said he was "immensely popular" across all parties and UK Prime Minister David Cameron called him a "straight talker and a great loss to the assembly and to Wales".

== Personal life ==
Williams, who was born and raised in Cilcain, Flintshire, began work in the agricultural industry aged 15. As well as being a sheep and cattle farmer, he was also a renowned expert and international judge of Welsh cobs (ponies).

For more than 20 years, Williams was a member of the Livestock Committee of the Royal Welsh Agricultural Society that organises the Royal Welsh Show In 2010, he realised a lifetime ambition when he was given the honour of judging the supreme champion at the RWS. In total he missed only six Royal Welsh shows in 45 years.

Williams was also Chairman of Flintshire County Farmers Union of Wales for eight years, a lifetime member of the Welsh Pony and Cob Society and President of the Denbighshire and Flintshire Agricultural Society.

He was married and had a son and daughter.

== Illness and death ==
Williams was diagnosed with colon cancer in the summer of 2010, and died of the disease on 1 April 2011.

In May 2012, an inquest into Williams' death heard that misdiagnosis of the cancer resulted in a five-month delay in its treatment. In April 2010, Williams was initially told by the Betsi Cadwaladr University Health Board that he had ulcerative colitis, five months before the colon cancer was correctly identified. The coroner concluded that the delay may have allowed him to "live longer but not necessarily have been cured". The case was subject to legal action by the Williams family.

== Legacy ==
Since 2011 the Brynle Williams Memorial Award has been presented at the Royal Welsh Show by the Welsh Government's Department for Agriculture. It recognises the achievements of young farmers who received support from the Welsh Government's Young Farmers Entrant Support Scheme. The award was established in honour of Williams' contribution to Welsh agriculture as both an AM and an active farmer.

Senedd
Preceded by Peter Rogers	Assembly Member for North Wales; 2003–2011	Succeeded by Antoinette Sandbach
Political offices
Preceded by Elin Jones	Shadow Minister for Rural Affairs; 2007–2011	Succeeded by Antoinette Sandbach
