= Steve Brine =

British politician (born 1974)

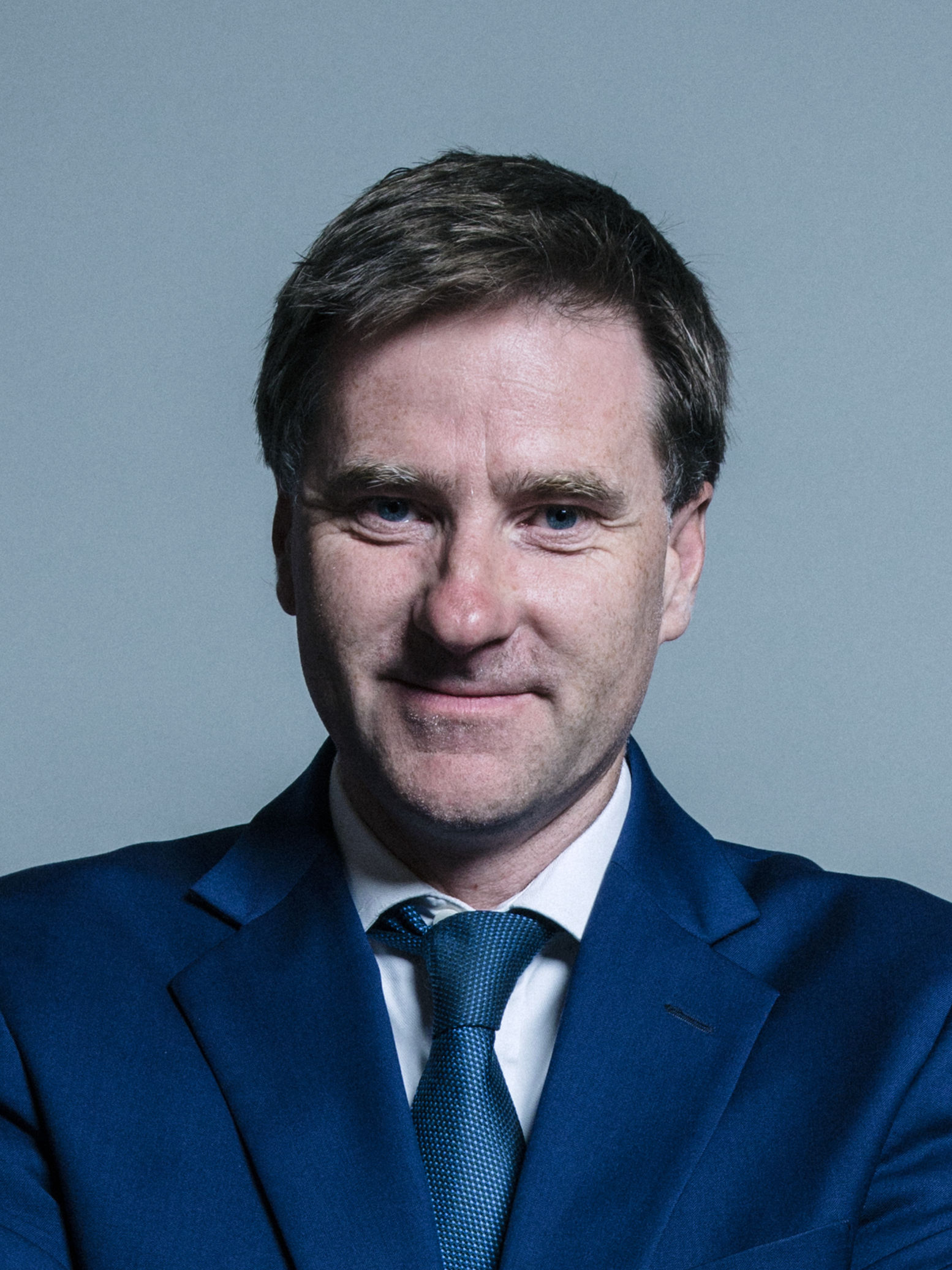
- Official portrait, 2017

Chair of the Health and Social Care Select Committee
- In office 3 November 2022 – 30 May 2024
- Preceded by: Jeremy Hunt
- Succeeded by: Layla Moran

Parliamentary Under-Secretary of State for Primary Care and Public Health
- In office 14 June 2017 – 25 March 2019
- Prime Minister: Theresa May
- Preceded by: Nicola Blackwood
- Succeeded by: Seema Kennedy

Member of Parliament for Winchester
- In office 6 May 2010 – 30 May 2024
- Preceded by: Mark Oaten
- Succeeded by: Danny Chambers

Personal details
- Born: Stephen Charles Brine; 28 January 1974 (age 52)
- Party: Conservative (Note: Whip suspended from 3 September to 29 October 2019.)
- Spouse: Susie Toulson (m. 2003)
- Children: 2
- Education: Liverpool Hope University
- Website: www.stevebrine.com

Stephen Charles Brine (born 28 January 1974) is a British politician who served as the Member of Parliament (MP) for Winchester from 2010 to 2024. A member of the Conservative Party, he worked as a BBC radio journalist and in public relations prior to his political career. Brine identifies as a one-nation conservative.

He served as Parliamentary Under-Secretary for Public Health and Primary Care at the Department of Health from June 2017 to March 2019, when Brine resigned to vote against the government's policy on Brexit. Brine had the Conservative whip removed on 3 September by Prime Minister Boris Johnson for supporting the Benn Act, an attempt to prevent a no-deal Brexit. He sat for over a month as an independent politician before being readmitted to the party on 29 October 2019.

Brine announced in June 2023 that he would be standing down at the 2024 general election. In 2024, he became a political advisor for various public relations firms.

== Early life and career ==
Stephen Charles Brine was born on 28 January 1974 to Clive Charles and Gloria Elizabeth Brine. He has a sister called Tracey. He attended Bohunt School, and Highbury College. He was a volunteer for the hospital broadcasting service Radio Lion at the Royal Surrey County Hospital. He studied history at Liverpool Hope University, where he also served a sabbatical year as president of its students' union.

After graduating, Brine worked as a radio journalist for the BBC. His first job was at BBC Southern Counties Radio in Guildford. He also did an internship in Chicago with the radio station WGN. Brine later worked as a director of the golf marketing agency Azalea Group.

== Political career ==
Brine worked in the Conservative Central Office as a researcher during William Hague's leadership, and was the campaign director for the party in Hampshire during the 2001−2005 parliament. He was selected as the party's prospective parliamentary candidate (PPC) for Winchester in November 2006. Brine was a member of the party's A-List. His ideology was based on one-nation conservatism. In November 2022, he was elected chair of the Health and Social Care Select Committee.

He was elected as MP for Winchester in the 2010 general election with a majority of 3,048 (5.4%) votes. The seat had previously been held by the Liberal Democrat MP Mark Oaten since the 1997 general election, who had stood down prior to the 2010 general election. During the 2010−2015 parliament, he was a member of the Justice Select Committee.

Brine was one of 136 Conservative MPs who voted against the Marriage (Same Sex Couples) Act 2013, which legalised same-sex marriage in England and Wales. His reason for voting against the Act was that he felt that the bill had been rushed and he alleged that it was an issue that had he had received the most opposition to from many of his constituents. In the same year, he was appointed as parliamentary private secretary (PPS) to Mike Penning, Minister of State at the Department for Work & Pensions and Minister for Disabled People. In July 2014, Brine became PPS to Penning in his new role as Minister of State for Policing within the Ministry of Justice.

He was re-elected in the 2015 and 2017 general election. In May 2015, Brine became PPS to Jeremy Hunt, Secretary of State for Health. Following the appointment of Theresa May as the prime minister in July 2016, he was appointed as assistant government whip at HM Treasury, a role he held till June 2017 when he was promoted to Parliamentary Under-Secretary for Public Health and Primary Care at the Department of Health.

Brine supported the UK remaining within the EU in the 2016 UK EU membership referendum. He voted for then Prime Minister Theresa May's Brexit withdrawal agreement in early 2019. In the indicative votes on 27 March, Brine voted for single market membership, customs union with the EU, the Norway-plus model, and against a no-deal Brexit. He had resigned from his ministerial post two days prior. Brine supported Jeremy Hunt in the 2019 Conservative Party leadership election. He voted for the legalisation of same-sex marriage in Northern Ireland.

In September 2019, he was one of 21 MPs expelled from the Conservative Party for voting for the European Union (Withdrawal) (No. 2) Act 2019 which aimed to prevent a no-deal Brexit. Brine was one of 10 MPs to be readmitted to the party on 29 October. He was re-elected in the 2019 general election, with his majority falling from 9,999 to 985.

Brine was one of 38 MPs to vote against the second national lockdown during the COVID-19 pandemic in November 2020. He called for MPs and their staff to be prioritised for the COVID-19 vaccine in January 2021 and for all COVID-19 legislative restrictions to be removed by the end of April 2021.

Following the publication of civil servant Sue Gray's report into the Partygate scandal, Brine submitted a letter of no confidence in Prime Minister Boris Johnson calling for his resignation in May 2022. He initially endorsed Jeremy Hunt in the July 2022 Conservative Party leadership election but when Hunt was eliminated from the contest he endorsed Rishi Sunak.

In November 2022, he was selected by fellow MPs to be the chair of the Health and Social Care Select Committee. After being appointed, Brine said his priorities as chair were to get "better value for our money" from the NHS and improving young people's mental health care. In June 2023, he announced that he would be standing down as an MP at the 2024 general election.

=== Lobbying ===
Outside of his parliamentary role, he was also a strategic advisor for the pharmaceuticals company Sigma, healthcare recruitment firm Remedium Partners, and assistive technology company Microlink PC. He ended his involvement with these companies at the end of 2021 following then Prime Minister Boris Johnson's suggestion that he would ban MPs from having consultancy jobs following the Owen Patterson lobbying scandal. In January 2022, Brine was criticised for breaching lobbying rules by Eric Pickles, the chair of the anti-corruption watchdog Advisory Committee on Business Appointments (ACOBA) for starting his role at Sigma before informing ACOBA of his appointment. He apologised for "a mistake" and blamed "poor admin" on his part. Pickles also criticised him for contacting the then Vaccines Minister Nadhim Zahawi. He stated, "I do not consider it was in keeping with the letter or the spirit of the government's Rules for a former minister at DHSC to contact a minister with responsibilities for health on behalf of a pharmaceutical company which pays him." Brine had attended a meeting with Sigma executives and Zahawi in February 2021.

In March 2023, it was announced that the Parliamentary Commissioner for Standards Daniel Greenberg would be starting an investigation into further lobbying allegations related to his work as a paid advisor for Remedium. This followed the release of leaked WhatsApp messages by The Daily Telegraph as part of the Lockdown Files in which he stated in early 2021 that he had been "trying for months to help the NHS through a company I am connected with – called Remedium" and that he had attempted to contact the then Secretary of State for Health and Social Care Matt Hancock and Chief Executive of NHS England Simon Stevens but had been rebuffed. Brine commented in response to the leak of the messages that he had been acting in the "national interest" in a "national crisis" and that "Ultimately, it led nowhere let alone secure any business for Remedium". In May 2023, Greenberg found that he had broken rules twice by "failing to declare" that he was a "paid strategic adviser to Remedium Partners" in his discussions with ministers. However, he did not find that Brine had engaged in paid advocacy as the services provided by Remedium were offered for free.

== Post-parliamentary career ==
In 2024, Brine became a political advisor to the public relations firms M+F Health, GK Strategy, healthcare insurance firm Lime Health, and diagnostics research company Attomarker. He also became a columnist for the online community pharmacy publication Chemist + Druggist and the chair of trustees of the Winchester Cancer Sanctuary.

== Personal life ==
Brine married Susie Toulson in 2003. She is a former speech and language therapist and works in early years. Susie is one of the daughters of the late Lord Toulson, a former Supreme Court judge. They have one daughter born in 2007 and one son born in 2010.

Parliament of the United Kingdom
Preceded by Mark Oaten	Member of Parliament for Winchester; 2010–2024	Succeeded by Danny Chambers
