= 2019 Dissolution Honours =

British government recognitions

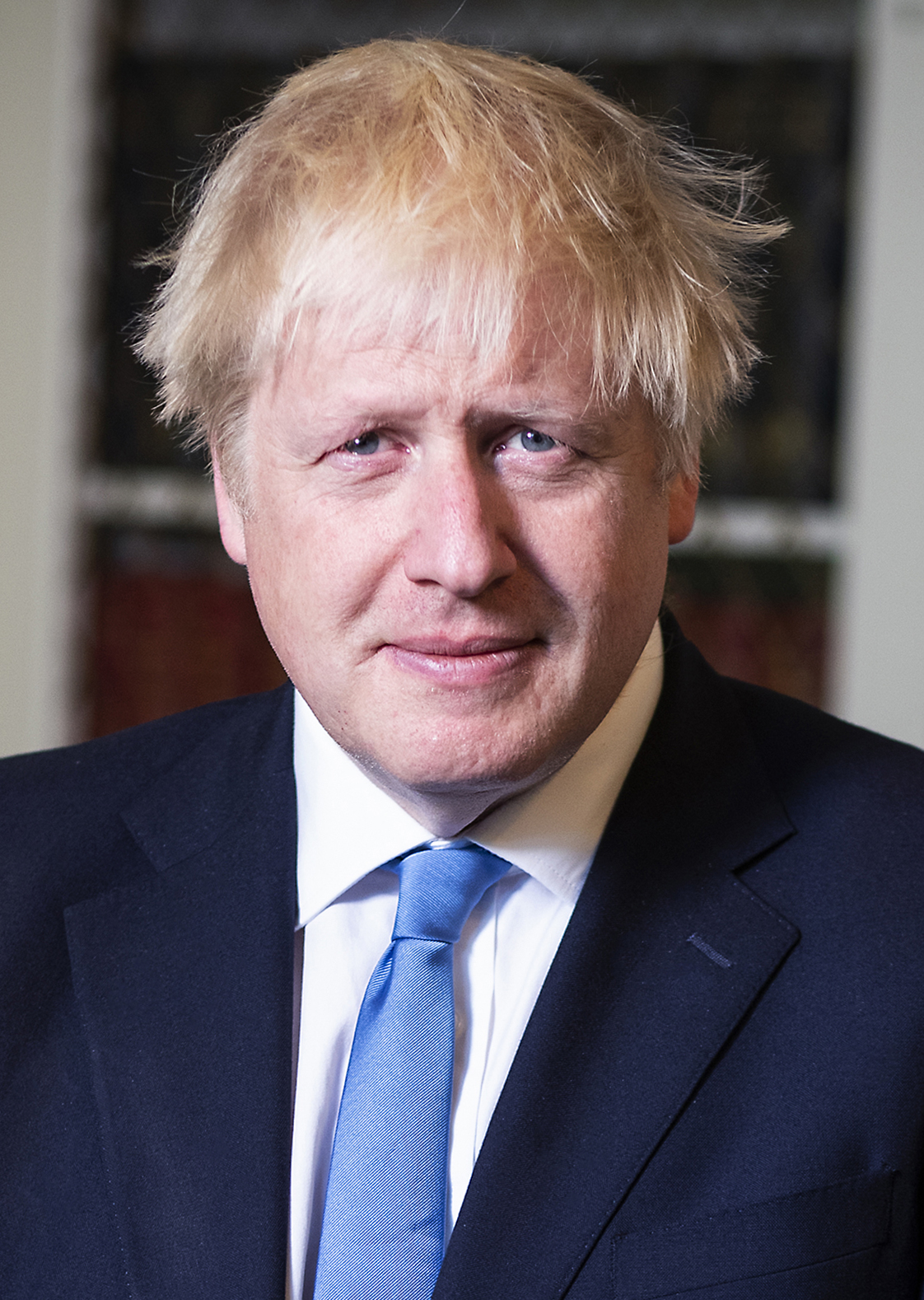
Prime Minister Boris Johnson in 2019

The 2019 Dissolution Honours List was issued on 31 July 2020 following the 2019 United Kingdom general election the previous December, in which the Conservative Party won a large majority. This list was released concurrently with the 2020 Political Honours list.

Such lists usually appear in The London Gazette after weeks, but this time the gazette version became available as late as 15 November 2022.

== Life Peerages ==
Conservative

- Sir Henry Bellingham, Kt, to be Baron Bellingham, of Congham in the County of Norfolk
- Rt. Hon. Kenneth Clarke, CH QC, to be Baron Clarke of Nottingham, of West Bridgford in the County of Nottinghamshire
- Rt. Hon. Ruth Davidson, to be Baroness Davidson of Lundin Links, of Lundin Links in the County of Fife
- Rt. Hon. Philip Hammond, to be Baron Hammond of Runnymede, of Runnymede in the County of Surrey
- Rt. Hon. Nicholas Herbert, CBE, to be Baron Herbert of South Downs, of Arundel in the County of West Sussex
- Rt. Hon. Joseph Johnson, to be Baron Johnson of Marylebone, of Marylebone in the City of Westminster
- Colonel Rt. Hon. John Mark Lancaster, TD VR, to be Baron Lancaster of Kimbolton, of Kimbolton in the County of Cambridgeshire
- Rt. Hon. Sir Patrick McLoughlin, CH, to be Baron McLoughlin, of Cannock Chase in the County of Staffordshire
- Aamer Sarfraz, to be Baron Sarfaz, of Kensington in the Royal London Borough of Kensington and Chelsea
- Rt. Hon. Edward Vaizey, to be Baron Vaizey of Didcot, of Wantage in the County of Oxfordshire

Labour

- Kathryn Clark, to be Baroness Clark of Kilwinning, of Kilwinning in the County of Ayrshire
- Brinley Davies, to be Baron Davies of Brixton, of Brixton in the London Borough of Lambeth

Democratic Unionist Party

- Rt. Hon. Nigel Dodds, OBE, to be Baron Dodds of Duncairn, of Duncairn in the City of Belfast

Non-affiliated (former Labour MPs)

- Rt. Hon. Frank Field, to be Baron Field of Birkenhead, of Birkenhead in the County of Merseyside
- Catherine Hoey, to be Baroness Hoey, of Lylehill and Rathlin in the County of Antrim
- Ian Austin, to be Baron Austin of Dudley, of Dudley in the County of West Midlands
- Rt. Hon. Gisela Stuart, to be Baroness Stuart of Edgbaston, of Edgbaston in the City of Birmingham
- John Woodcock, to be Baron Walney, of the Isle of Walney in the County of Cumbria

== Knights Bachelor ==
- Philip May – for political service
- Cllr. Raymond Puddifoot, MBE – for services to the London Borough of Hillingdon
