= Carry-over motion =

In the Parliament of the United Kingdom, a carry-over motion or carry-over bill is a form of motion. Ordinarily a bill that does not receive royal assent by the end of the parliamentary session fails; to become an Act, it must be re-introduced in the following session. A carry-over motion allows the bill to continue its progress at the start of the following session rather than having to start the legislative process again. The bill can still fail notwithstanding a carry-over if an early election is called.

Some restrictions apply:

1. Only government bills can be carried over; backbench and opposition bills cannot be subjected to such a motion.
2. Bills introduced in the House of Lords cannot be carried over. (Additionally, the Lords has no procedure of its own for carrying bills over.)
3. Bills can only be carried over once; a bill that was carried over from a previous session cannot be carried over again.
4. A slightly different procedure applies to "bills brought in upon a ways and means resolution", i.e. money bills.
