= Antoinette Sandbach =

British politician (born 1969)

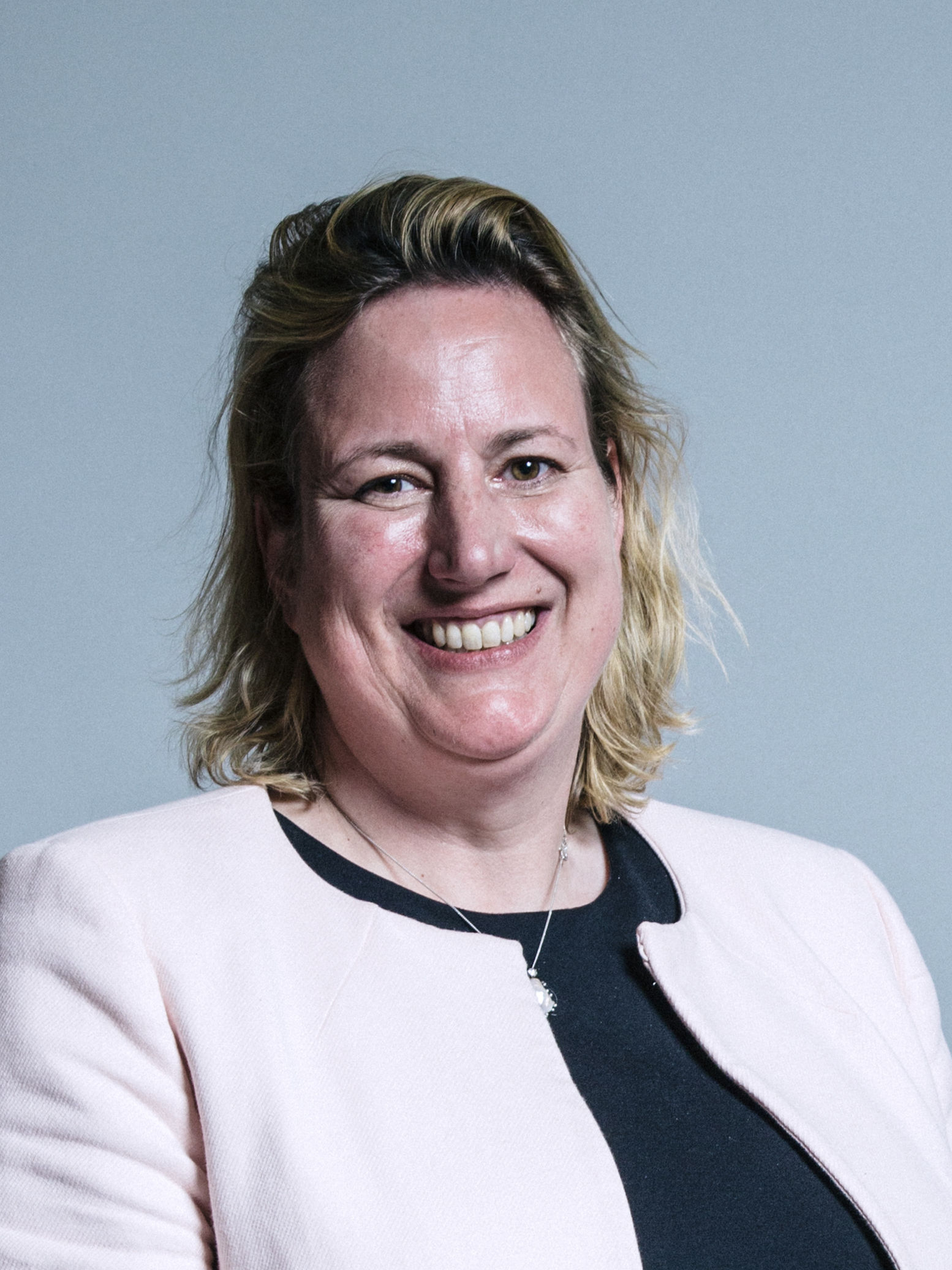
- Official portrait, 2017

Member of Parliament for Eddisbury
- In office 7 May 2015 – 6 November 2019
- Preceded by: Stephen O'Brien
- Succeeded by: Edward Timpson

Member of the Welsh Assembly for North Wales
- In office 6 May 2011 – 8 May 2015
- Preceded by: Brynle Williams
- Succeeded by: Janet Haworth

Personal details
- Born: Antoinette Geraldine Mackeson-Sandbach; 15 February 1969 (age 57) Hammersmith, London, England
- Party: Liberal Democrats (2019–present)
- Other political affiliations: Independent (2019); Conservative (until 2019)
- Spouse: Matthew Sherratt (m. 2012)
- Children: 2
- Education: University of Nottingham
- Website: Official website

Antoinette Geraldine Mackeson-Sandbach (born 15 February 1969), known as Antoinette Sandbach, is a British barrister, farm manager and politician who was elected as a North Wales region Member of the Welsh Assembly at the May 2011 election, and subsequently elected Member of Parliament for Eddisbury in Cheshire at the 2015 general election.

Elected as a Conservative, Sandbach had the Conservative whip removed on 3 September 2019 and later lost a vote of no confidence by the Eddisbury Conservative Association. Following deselection as a Conservative, Sandbach chose to become a Liberal Democrat. She lost her seat to her former party in the 2019 general election.

== Early life, education, and ancestry ==
Antoinette Sandbach was born in 1969 at Queen Charlotte's Hospital Hammersmith, West London, the eldest child of an Anglo-Welsh father, Ian Mackeson-Sandbach (1933–2012), and a Dutch mother, Annie Marie Antoinette (née van Lanschot), who married in 1967 at St. John's Cathedral in Den Bosch. She has three younger sisters.

Her paternal grandmother, Geraldine Sandbach (1909–2001), was the only child of Maj.-Gen. Arthur Sandbach CB DSO (1859–1928), a prominent landowner in North Wales, and the Hon. Ina Douglas-Pennant OBE (1867–1942), a daughter of George Douglas-Pennant, 2nd Baron Penrhyn. Arthur Sandbach's grandfather was Samuel Sandbach, a prominent merchant and slave owner in the West Indies.

In 1932, Geraldine married Capt. Lawrie Mackeson (1907–1984; brother of Sir Harry Ripley Mackeson, 1st Baronet), and adopted the surname Mackeson-Sandbach.

Geraldine's estates included Hafodunos near Abergele and Bryngwyn Hall near Llanfyllin, as well as a 4,000 acre logwood plantation in Jamaica. In 1928, her father died six months after his elder brother, leaving Geraldine with double death duties on the estate. The Mackeson-Sandbachs sold the main house at Hafodunos in 1934 and moved into a farmhouse on the estate. They sold the Jamaican planation in 1938. Capt. Mackeson-Sandbach became adept at farming and improved the family properties in north and central Wales, where he was influential in the forestry community during the timber shortage in the post-war years. Beginning in the 1980s, her paternal aunt Auriol, Marchioness of Linlithgow (the third wife of 4th Marquess of Linlithgow, oversaw the restoration of Bryngwyn Hall, which had been shuttered since 1928.

Antoinette Sandbach was educated at Haileybury and Imperial Service College and subsequently at the University of Nottingham, where she studied law. She practised as a criminal barrister in London for 13 years, latterly at 9 Bedford Row chambers. She was twice elected to the Bar Council in that time.

She then ran the family farming business, Hafodunos Farms Ltd, at Llangernyw in the Elwy valley of North Wales from where she embarked on a political career.

=== Legal action over slavery link ===
In August 2023, it was reported that Sandbach had asked for her name to be removed from research into slavery conducted by Malik Al Nasir, who had registered for a PhD at Cambridge University. Al Nasir was interested in how Samuel Sandbach's fortune was derived and in particular in his activities in British Guiana. In a TEDx talk given in 2021, Al Nasir had identified Sandbach as one of many descendants of Samuel Sandbach, and linked her to family properties in Wales. Sandbach was unhappy that she had been "singled out". She complained to Cambridge University about perceived inaccuracies in Al Nasir's work and she asserted that she had a right to be forgotten given the relative shortness of her parliamentary career. She also argued that, although she no longer lived in Wales, there was no public interest which outweighed the threat to personal safety caused by releasing a former address. At the time of the TEDx talk, Sandbach was in court to give evidence against a former police officer who had harassed and threatened to kill her because of her views on Brexit. (Having received a suspended prison sentence in 2019, he appealed).

Sandbach was reported as having threatened legal action against Cambridge University for failing to apply their GDPR policies and their policy on naming living individuals. On 1 September 2023, Sandbach appeared on Times Radio where she asserted that her complaint related to "concerns for her personal safety" and that she did not object to being linked to her family's slavery history. She specified that she would be making a complaint to the UK information commissioner. Sandbach also claimed that she "only learned about her family history three months ago".

== Political career ==
In the 2007 Welsh Assembly election, Sandbach contested the Labour-held constituency of Delyn. She lost, but achieved a swing of 3.7% from Labour to Conservative and Labour narrowly held the seat by just 511 votes. Sandbach contested the Delyn parliamentary constituency in the 2010 general election, but lost again, though achieving a larger swing of 6.7% from Labour to Conservative. Following the death of Brynle Williams in 2011, she became a Conservative Regional Assembly Member for North Wales.

During her time in the Assembly she was appointed Shadow Rural Affairs Minister. In 2014, she was appointed Shadow Minister for the Environment. Sandbach also sat on the Assembly's Environment and Sustainability Committee.

In March 2015, Sandbach was selected as the Conservative Party candidate for the Conservative-held seat of Eddisbury in Cheshire, England. She held the safe Conservative seat with a majority of nearly 13,000, and promptly resigned from the Welsh Assembly, to be succeeded by Janet Haworth.

On entering the House she was elected to the Welsh Affairs Select Committee and the Energy and Climate Change Select Committee, which she sat on until it was disbanded in October 2016. In March 2017, she was elected on to the Business, Energy and Industrial Strategy Select Committee and was subsequently re-elected to the committee after the 2017 General Election. Sandbach was appointed to the joint committee examining the failure of Carillion and was highly critical of the lack of oversight by the auditors and directors of the company.

She was also an elected executive member of the 1922 Committee of backbench Conservative MPs from 2015 to 2019.

One of her main policy interests was improving services for those who suffer the loss of a baby. Following a debate in the House of Commons in November 2015, she helped set up the All-Party Parliamentary Group on Baby Loss, of which she was appointed co-chair. The group worked with all the major child loss charities to develop the national bereavement care pathway which has since been adopted by 108 NHS trusts in England. Ms Sandbach secured a £1.5 million grant for a new counselling centre at Alder Hey Children's Hospital in Liverpool, the hospital which provided support for her after the loss of her son

Sandbach has been a strong advocate for improving representation of women in the workforce, women's rights and female representation in Parliament. In some of her first appearances in the House she raised the issue of encouraging more girls to study Science, Technology, Engineering and Maths subjects in order for them to access those highly paid, highly skilled jobs and reduce the gap between men and women in the workplace.

Sandbach supported the United Kingdom remaining within the European Union (EU) in the 2016 EU membership referendum. In the referendum, the UK voted to leave the EU (Brexit). She retained the Eddisbury seat at the 2017 general election, with a majority of 11,942.

Sandbach was one of 11 Conservative MPs to rebel against then Prime Minister Theresa May's government in voting for an amendment to the European Union (Withdrawal) Act 2018 on 13 December 2017, which guaranteed MPs a vote on the final Brexit deal agreed with the European Union. She voted for May's withdrawal agreement on all three opportunities.

Sandbach endorsed Rory Stewart during the 2019 Conservative leadership election. She was one of 21 Conservative MPs who had their whip withdrawn on 3 September after rebelling against the government by voting for opposition MPs to control the parliamentary process to try to prevent a no-deal Brexit, after which she sat as an independent. On 12 September, she declared her support for a referendum on the Brexit withdrawal agreement. Ms Sandbach was one of a number of female MPs, including Nicky Morgan MP and Anna Soubry MP who went public about the increasing threats received by female MPs featuring in the ITV documentary "Exposed" filmed in 2019.

On 15 October 2019. the members of the Eddisbury Conservative Association passed a motion of no confidence in her. She commented that the local Conservatives were "an unrepresentative handful of people" and they should not get to decide the question.

On 31 October 2019, it was announced that Sandbach would stand in her constituency as a Liberal Democrat candidate. On 12 December, standing as a Liberal Democrat, she lost her seat to the Conservative candidate, Edward Timpson. Timpson received 30,095 votes to Sandbach's 9,582.

== Personal life ==
Sandbach's daughter Sacha was born in 2002. Sandbach separated from Sacha's father in 2003 and moved back to her family estate in 2005. She lost a five-day-old son, Sam, to sudden infant death syndrome in 2009 and married Matthew Sherratt, a sculptor, in 2012.

Sandbach is believed to be the tallest woman to sit in the UK parliament, her height stated to be 6 feet 5 inches (1.96 m) in 2019.

In August 2020, Sandbach announced she had breast cancer and was to start chemotherapy. In March 2021, she announced that a biopsy had found no remaining cancer cells, but that she would require additional chemotherapy.

Senedd
| Preceded by Brynle Williams | Assembly Member for North Wales; 2011–2015 | Succeeded by Janet Haworth |
Political offices
| Preceded by Brynle Williams | Shadow Minister for Rural Affairs; 2011–2015 | Succeeded by Janet Haworth |
Parliament of the United Kingdom
| Preceded by Stephen O'Brien | Member of Parliament for Eddisbury; 2015–2019 | Succeeded by Edward Timpson |
