= Goody =

Goody, Goodies, or Goody's may refer to:

== Brands ==
- Goody (brand), a brand of hair styling products owned by ACON Investments, LLC.
- Goody's Powder, a pain reliever sold primarily in the southern United States
- Goody's (restaurant), a fast food chain in Greece and neighboring countries
- Goody's (store), a retail clothing chain in the United States

== Film and TV ==
- The Goodies, a UK comedy trio, Grahame Garden, Tim Brooke-Taylor and Bill Oddie
  - The Goodies (TV series), a British television comedy series created by The Goodies
- The Goodies (film), 1959 German film

== Music ==
=== Albums ===
- Goodies (J. J. Johnson album) recorded in 1965
- Goodies (George Benson album), recorded in 1968
- Goodies (Ciara album), a 2004 album by Ciara
- Goodies: The Videos & More, a 2005 DVD by Ciara

=== Songs ===
- "Goodies", song by girl band The Goodees 1969
- "Goodies" (song), a 2004 song by Ciara
- "Goody Goody", a 1936 song composed by Matty Malneck, with lyrics by Johnny Mercer

== Other uses ==
- Goodwife or Goody, a former courtesy title of married women
- Confectionery or candy
- Goody or goodie, a hero or protagonist in a story or film
- Goody, Kentucky, an unincorporated community
- Goody (dessert), an Irish pudding-like dish
- Goody (name)
- Sam Goody, music and entertainment retailer in the United States
- Goody (video game), a 1987 video game

== See also ==
- The History of Little Goody Two-Shoes, children's story (1765)
- Goodey, a surname
- Goudie, a surname
- Goudie (band), a glam rock band from Austin, Texas
- The Goodees, an American pop music girl group active in the late 1960s
