= List of British politicians who have changed party affiliation =

This is a list of members of the House of Commons of the United Kingdom, the House of Lords, British members of the European Parliament, members of the British devolved legislatures (such as the Scottish Parliament, Senedd, and Northern Ireland Assembly) and Police and Crime Commissioners (PCCs) who have changed their party affiliation (i.e. abandoning a previous party membership to take up a new one) or who have resigned from, been suspended from or been expelled from their previous party affiliation, making them independents. When a member of a legislature switches from one party to another, this is called crossing the floor. The list details the dates, members involved, previous and new party affiliations, and an explanation for their switch.

== Members of Parliament who have changed party affiliation ==
Date	Member	Before	After	Notes
=== MPs 1680–1832 ===
1698	John Grubham Howe	Whig	Tory	
1707	Sir Robert Harley	Whig	Tory	
1725	John Montagu, Viscount Hinchingbrooke	Whig	Tory	
1725	Sir William Pulteney	Whig	Tory	
1793	William Windham	Whig	Independent	
1795	Robert Stewart, Viscount Castlereagh	Whig	Tory	
1795	Thomas Pelham	Whig	Tory	
1810	Charles Williams-Wynn	Whig	Tory	Tried to create a third political party, failed and joined the Tories.
1822	Henry John Temple, 3rd Viscount Palmerston	Tory	Whig	
1828	Charles Williams-Wynn	Tory	Whig	Was not offered a position in Government.
1834	Charles Williams-Wynn	Whig	Tory	Offered position in Government.
=== 1832–1847 Parliaments ===
1834	Sir James Graham, 2nd Baronet	Whig	Conservative	Resigned as First Lord of the Admiralty.
1834	Lord Stanley	Whig	Conservative	Resigned as Secretary of State for War and the Colonies.
1834	Lord George Bentinck	Whig	Conservative	
1834	Bingham Baring	Whig	Conservative	
1846	William Ewart Gladstone	Conservative	Peelite	Resigned as Secretary of State for War and the Colonies.
1846	Henry Goulburn	Conservative	Peelite	Resigned as Chancellor of the Exchequer.
1846	Sir James Graham, 2nd Baronet	Conservative	Peelite	Resigned as Home Secretary.
1846	Sidney Herbert	Conservative	Peelite	Resigned as Secretary at War.
1846	John Young	Conservative	Peelite	Resigned as Parliamentary Secretary to the Treasury.
1846	Edward Cardwell	Conservative	Peelite	Resigned as Financial Secretary to the Treasury.
=== 1847–1886 Parliaments ===
1847	Sir John Young, 2nd Baronet	Conservative	Peelite	
1847	Lord Ernest Bruce	Conservative	Peelite	
1847	Henry Bingham Baring	Conservative	Peelite	
1852	Frederick Peel	Conservative	Peelite	
1852	Henry FitzRoy	Conservative	Peelite	
1852	James Stuart-Wortley	Conservative	Peelite	
1853	Lord Alfred Hervey	Conservative	Peelite	
1853	Sir John Young, 2nd Baronet	Peelite	Conservative	
1859	William Ewart Gladstone	Peelite	Liberal	
1859	Frederick Peel	Peelite	Liberal	
1868	Edward James Saunderson	Liberal	Conservative	
1879	James Yeaman	Liberal	Conservative	
=== 1886–1900 Parliaments ===
1886	Joseph Chamberlain	Liberal	Liberal Unionist	Created the Liberal Unionist Party after disagreeing with William Gladstone and splitting over Home Rule for Ireland; Was the President of the Board of Trade until his defection.
1886	Sir Henry James	Liberal	Liberal Unionist	Was the Attorney-General until his defection.
1886	Edward Heneage	Liberal	Liberal Unionist	Was the Chancellor of the Duchy of Lancaster until his defection.
1886	The Marquess of Hartington	Liberal	Liberal Unionist	Was the Secretary of State for War until his defection.
1886	Sir George Otto Trevelyan, 2nd Baronet	Liberal	Liberal Unionist	Was the Secretary for Scotland until his defection.
1886	William Shepherd Allen	Liberal	Liberal Unionist	
1886	Arthur Peel	Liberal	Liberal Unionist	
1886	John Boyd Kinnear	Liberal	Liberal Unionist	
1886	William Shepherd Allen	Liberal	Liberal Unionist	
1886	Walter Morrison	Liberal	Liberal Unionist	
1886	Arthur Pease	Liberal	Liberal Unionist	
1886	Arthur Pease	Liberal	Liberal Unionist	
1886	Henry Vivian	Liberal	Liberal Unionist	
1886	John Corbett	Liberal	Liberal Unionist	
1886	William Cornwallis-West	Liberal	Liberal Unionist	
1886	William Crossman	Liberal	Liberal Unionist	
1886	John Westlake	Liberal	Liberal Unionist	
1886	Henry Brand	Liberal	Liberal Unionist	
1886	Donald Currie	Liberal	Liberal Unionist	
1886	George Dixon	Liberal	Liberal Unionist	
1886	Sir Cuthbert Quilter, 1st Baronet	Liberal	Liberal Unionist	
1886	John William Ramsden	Liberal	Liberal Unionist	
1886	Charles Pelham Villiers	Liberal	Liberal Unionist	
1886	Sir Robert Anstruther, 5th Baronet	Liberal	Liberal Unionist	
1886	Sir George Macpherson-Grant, 3rd Baronet	Liberal	Liberal Unionist	
1886	Ernest Noel	Liberal	Liberal Unionist	
1886	Alexander Craig Sellar	Liberal	Liberal Unionist	
1886	John Wilson	Liberal	Liberal Unionist	
1886	David Davies	Liberal	Liberal Unionist	
1886	Robert Bickersteth	Liberal	Liberal Unionist	
1886	Edward Watkin	Liberal	Liberal Unionist	
1886	Viscount Lymington	Liberal	Liberal Unionist	
1886	Viscount Wolmer	Liberal	Liberal Unionist	
1886	Viscount Ebrington	Liberal	Liberal Unionist	
1886	Viscount Howick	Liberal	Liberal Unionist	
1886	Viscount Baring	Liberal	Liberal Unionist	
1886	Viscount Lambton	Liberal	Liberal Unionist	
1886	Lord Richard Grosvenor	Liberal	Liberal Unionist	
1886	Lord Edward Cavendish	Liberal	Liberal Unionist	
1886	Sir Thomas Grove, 1st Baronet	Liberal	Liberal Unionist	
1886	Sir Robert Jardine, 1st Baronet	Liberal	Liberal Unionist	
1886	Sir Savile Brinton Crossley, 2nd Baronet	Liberal	Liberal Unionist	
1886	Sir John St Aubyn, 2nd Baronet	Liberal	Liberal Unionist	
1886	Hugh Elliot	Liberal	Liberal Unionist	
1886	Arthur Elliot	Liberal	Liberal Unionist	
1886	Andrew Fairbairn	Liberal	Liberal Unionist	
1886	Sir Charles Seely, 1st Baronet	Liberal	Liberal Unionist	
1886	Sir Alexander Brown, 1st Baronet	Liberal	Liberal Unionist	
1886	Savile Crossley	Liberal	Liberal Unionist	
1886	Sir Henry Wiggin, 1st Baronet	Liberal	Liberal Unionist	
1886	John Lubbock	Liberal	Liberal Unionist	
1886	Francis Taylor	Liberal	Liberal Unionist	
1886	Richard Frederick Fotheringham Campbell	Liberal	Liberal Unionist	
1886	John Wentworth-FitzWilliam	Liberal	Liberal Unionist	
1886	Archibald Corbett	Liberal	Liberal Unionist	
1886	Jesse Collings	Liberal	Liberal Unionist	
1886	Thomas Buchanan	Liberal	Liberal Unionist	
1886	George Dixon	Liberal	Liberal Unionist	
1886	Thomas Sutherland	Liberal	Liberal Unionist	
1886	Charles James Monk	Liberal	Liberal Unionist	
1886	William Kenrick	Liberal	Liberal Unionist	
1886	Robert Jasper More	Liberal	Liberal Unionist	
1886	Cathcart Wason	Liberal	Liberal Unionist	
1886	Lewis Fry	Liberal	Liberal Unionist	
1886	John Corbett	Liberal	Liberal Unionist	
1886	Mitchell Henry	Liberal	Liberal Unionist	
1886	Richard Biddulph Martin	Liberal	Liberal Unionist	
1886	Sir John Pender	Liberal	Liberal Unionist	
1886	Henry Meysey-Thompson	Liberal	Liberal Unionist	
1886	George Pitt-Lewis	Liberal	Liberal Unionist	
1886	Alfred Barnes	Liberal	Liberal Unionist	
1886	Lewis McIver	Liberal	Liberal Unionist	
1886	Richard Chamberlain	Liberal	Liberal Unionist	
1886	George Salis-Schwabe	Liberal	Liberal Unionist	
1886	Francis William Maclean	Liberal	Liberal Unionist	
1886	Francis Bingham Mildmay	Liberal	Liberal Unionist	
1886	Hamar Alfred Bass	Liberal	Liberal Unionist	
1886	Henry Hobhouse	Liberal	Liberal Unionist	
1886	William Pirrie Sinclair	Liberal	Liberal Unionist	
1886	John Jenkins	Liberal	Liberal Unionist	
1886	Robert Finlay	Liberal	Liberal Unionist	
1886	William Bickford-Smith	Liberal	Liberal Unionist	
1886	Robert Thornhagh Gurdon	Liberal	Liberal Unionist	
1886	Charles Fraser-Mackintosh	Liberal	Liberal Unionist	
1886	Lewis Fry	Liberal	Liberal Unionist	
1886	George Hastings	Liberal	Liberal Unionist	
1886	Henry Howard	Liberal	Liberal Unionist	
1886	Joseph Powell-Williams	Liberal	Liberal Unionist	
1886	Thomas Richardson	Liberal	Liberal Unionist	
1886	Sir Julian Goldsmid, 3rd Baronet	Liberal	Liberal Unionist	
1886	Peter Rylands	Liberal	Liberal Unionist	
1886	John Bright	Liberal	Liberal Unionist	
1886	William Kenrick	Liberal	Liberal Unionist	
1886	Jesse Collings	Liberal	Liberal Unionist	
1886	James William Barclay	Liberal	Liberal Unionist	
1886	Frederick William Grafton	Liberal	Liberal Unionist	
1886	Alfred Barnes	Liberal	Liberal Unionist	
1886	Michael Biddulph	Liberal	Liberal Unionist	
1886	Nevil Story Maskelyne	Liberal	Liberal Unionist	
1886	Edmond Wodehouse	Liberal	Liberal Unionist	
1886	William Sproston Caine	Liberal	Liberal Unionist	
1886	Henry Frederick Beaumont	Liberal	Liberal Unionist	
1886	Greville Richard Vernon	Liberal	Liberal Unionist	
1888	Henry Wentworth-FitzWilliam	Liberal	Liberal Unionist	
1888	Cunninghame Graham	Liberal	Independent	
1888	Thomas Buchanan	Liberal Unionist	Liberal	
1888	Sir Thomas Grove, 1st Baronet	Liberal Unionist	Liberal	
1891	All Irish Conservative MPs	Irish Conservative	Irish Unionist	Conservatives in Ireland merged into new party.
1892	Benjamin Hingley	Liberal Unionist	Liberal	
1893	George Joachim Goschen	Liberal Unionist	Conservative	
1893	Thomas Henry Bolton	Liberal	Liberal Unionist	
1893	William Grenfell	Liberal	Conservative	
January 1893	Keir Hardie	Independent Labour	Ind. Labour Party	Independent Labour Party founded.
1898	George Doughty	Liberal	Liberal Unionist	
1899	Leonard Courtney	Liberal Unionist	Liberal	
1900	George Whiteley	Conservative	Liberal	Stood for Pudsey as Liberal in the 1900 election after standing down as Conservative MP for Stockport.
=== 1900–1906 Parliament ===
1902	Cathcart Wason	Liberal Unionist	Liberal	Resigned seat and fought by-election as an Independent Liberal.
1903	Michael Foster	Liberal Unionist	Liberal	
1903	John William Wilson	Liberal Unionist	Liberal	
31 May 1904	Winston Churchill	Conservative	Liberal	Changed party over dismay at the Conservative party becoming more "protectionist". Returned to Conservatives in the 1920s, stating "Anyone can rat, but it takes a certain amount of ingenuity to re-rat".
1904	John Eustace Jameson	Irish Parliamentary	Conservative	
1904	Jack Seely	Conservative	Ind. Conservative	
1904	Ivor Guest	Conservative	Liberal	
1904	Ernest Hatch	Conservative	Liberal	
1904	George Kemp	Liberal Unionist	Liberal	
1904	Lord Richard Cavendish	Liberal Unionist	Liberal	
1904	Edward Hain	Liberal Unionist	Liberal	
1904	Richard Bell	Labour	Liberal	
November 1904	Richard Rigg	Liberal	Conservative	Joined Conservatives because "he found himself in agreement with the Conservative government on so many key issues".
1905	John Dickson-Poynder	Conservative	Liberal	
1906	John Eldon Gorst	Conservative	Free Trader	
1906	Jack Seely	Ind. Conservative	Liberal	
=== 1906 – December 1910 Parliaments ===
1906	Carlyon Bellairs	Liberal	Liberal Unionist	
1906	Austin Taylor	Conservative	Liberal	
1906	John William Wilson	Liberal Unionist	Liberal	
1907	Leslie Renton	Liberal	Liberal Unionist	
1908	Archibald Corbett	Liberal Unionist	Liberal	Re-joined Liberal Party.
1909	Alexander Cross	Liberal Unionist	Liberal	
1909	Arthur Elliot	Liberal Unionist	Independent	Stood as an independent.
1909	Thomas Kincaid-Smith	Liberal	Independent	Stood as an independent.
1909	Enoch Edwards	Liberal	Labour	
1909	Frederick Hall	Liberal	Labour	
1909	William Johnson	Liberal	Labour	
1910	William Abraham	Liberal	Labour	
1910	William Edwin Harvey	Liberal	Labour	
1910	James Haslam	Liberal	Labour	
1910	Thomas Richards	Liberal	Labour	
1910	Albert Stanley	Liberal	Labour	
1910	John Wadsworth	Liberal	Labour	
1910	John Williams	Liberal	Labour	
1910	Harold Cox	Liberal	Free Trader	
=== December 1910–1918 Parliament ===
May 1912	35 MPs	Liberal Unionist	Conservative	Conservative and Liberal Unionist parties merged.
May 1912	John Gordon	Liberal Unionist	Irish Unionist	Irish Liberal Unionist and Unionist parties merged.
30 March 1914	William Edwin Harvey	Labour	Liberal	Resigned over the party's treatment of Barnet Kenyon, before and after the 1913 Chesterfield by-election, particularly regarding miner's representation.
1914	William Johnson	Labour	Liberal	Expelled from the Labour Party for addressing Liberal Party meetings.
1915	John Hancock	Labour	Liberal	Expelled from the Labour Party.
1915	John Wadsworth	Labour	Liberal	
1915	William Abraham	Labour	Liberal	
1917	Sir Richard Cooper, 2nd Baronet	Conservative	Independent	Those who defected in 1917 actually joined the National Party. However, before the general election of 1918 all members apart from Croft and Cooper had returned to the Conservatives or had lost their seats.
1917	Henry Page Croft	Conservative	Independent	Those who defected in 1917 actually joined the National Party. However, before the general election of 1918 all members apart from Croft and Cooper had returned to the Conservatives or had lost their seats.
1917	Richard Hamilton Rawson	Conservative	Independent	
1917	Alan Hughes Burgoyne	Conservative	Independent	
1917	Douglas George Carnegie	Conservative	Independent	
1917	Viscount Duncannon	Conservative	Independent	
1917	Rowland Hunt	Conservative	Independent	
1917	Edward Fitzroy	Conservative	Independent	
1918	Harland Bowden	Conservative	Ind. Unionist	
1918	Arthur Strauss	Conservative	Independent Labour	
1918	Charles Trevelyan	Liberal	Independent Labour	
1918	Arthur Ponsonby	Liberal	Independent	Contested as an Independent Democrat.
1918	R. L. Outhwaite	Liberal	Independent Liberal	
1918	Leo Chiozza Money	Liberal	Labour	
1918	Edward John	Liberal	Labour	
=== 1918–1922 Parliament ===
1918–1922	Many	Independent	Independent	During this Parliament it is difficult to track moves by many MPs between the pro- and anti-Coalition wings of their parties.
1918	George Nicoll Barnes	Labour	Independent Labour	Refused to resign from the Lloyd George Coalition.
1919	Jack Jones	National Socialist Party	Labour	Took the Labour whip, but remained affiliated to the National Socialist Party.
November 1919	Cecil L'Estrange Malone	Liberal	British Socialist Party	Turned towards Communism after a visit to Russia.
1920	Oswald Mosley	Conservative	Independent	Left over the Conservative Party's Irish policy, specifically the use of Black and Tans.
June/July 1920	Cecil L'Estrange Malone	British Socialist Party	Communist	
1921	All Irish Unionist MPs	Irish Unionist	UUP	Creation of Northern Ireland after partition of Ireland.
1921	Thomas Harbison	Irish Parliamentary	Nationalist	Creation of Northern Ireland after partition of Ireland.
April 1921	Richard Cooper	National	Conservative	Party dispanded.
April 1921	Henry Page Croft	National	Conservative	Party dispanded.
1922	John Hope	Liberal	Independent Liberal	Rejected as a candidate on the grounds that he had not made a single speech during his 24 years in Parliament.
1922	T. P. O'Connor	Irish Parliamentary	Irish Nationalist	Irish Parliamentary Party no longer represented in Parliament. It dissolved after the Irish Free State's establishment.
1922	James Malcolm Monteith Erskine	Anti-Waste League	Ind. Unionist	
Oct 1922	Murray Sueter	Anti-Waste League	Conservative	
=== 1922–1923 Parliament ===
1923	Gordon Ralph Hall Caine	Independent	Conservative	Took the Conservative whip.
1923	James Malcolm Monteith Erskine	Independent	Conservative	
=== 1923–1924 Parliament ===
February 1924	George M. Ll. Davies	Independent	Labour	Originally elected as an "Independent Christian Pacifist"; later took the Labour whip but did not join the party.
=== 1924–1929 Parliament ===
1924	Oswald Mosley	Independent	Labour	
January 1926	Sir Alfred Mond, Bt	Liberal	Conservative	Defected after falling out with Lloyd George.
1926	Joseph Kenworthy	Liberal	Labour	Resigned in opposition of Lloyd George's leadership.
1927	George Alfred Spencer	Labour	Independent	Expelled from the Labour party for brokering a local settlement during the General Strike.
1927	Leslie Haden-Guest	Labour	Independent	Resigned in protest of Labour's opposition of sending troops to Shanghai.
1927	Sir Robert Newman, Bt	Conservative	Independent	Whip withdrawn after a dispute between Newman and his local Conservative association, leading to his deselection as a Conservative parliamentary candidate, as well as differences with the party leadership surrounding his support for free-trade policies.
1928	Sir Basil Peto, Bt	Conservative	Independent	Whip withdrawn in April 1928 due to policy disagreements with Stanley Baldwin's Conservative government.
1928	Sir Basil Peto, Bt	Independent	Conservative	Whip restored in November 1928 after an overwhelming vote of confidence in Peto by his local party executive.
1929	Thomas Robinson	Liberal	Independent	
=== 1929–1931 Parliament ===
1931	Oswald Mosley	Labour	New Party	Created the New Party.
1931	Lady Cynthia Mosley	Labour	New Party	Joined the New Party.
1931	Oliver Baldwin	Labour	New Party	Joined the New Party but left after one day and sat as an independent.
1931	Oliver Baldwin	New Party	Independent	Joined the New Party but left after one day and sat as an independent.
1931	Robert Forgan	Labour	New Party	Joined the New Party.
1931	W. E. D. Allen	UUP	New Party	Joined the New Party.
1931	Cecil Dudgeon	Liberal	New Party	Joined the New Party.
February 1931	John Strachey	Labour	New Party	Joined the New Party.
June 1931	John Strachey	New Party	Independent	Did not agree with the party's drift towards fascism.
24 August 1931	Ramsay MacDonald	Labour	National Labour	Formed the National Government.
24 August 1931	Malcolm MacDonald	Labour	National Labour	Joined the National Government.
25 August 1931	Philip Snowden	Labour	National Labour	Joined the National Government.
25 August 1931	J. H. Thomas	Labour	National Labour	Joined the National Government.
1931	William Jowitt	Labour	National Labour	Followed MacDonald on 28 August.
1931	George Gillett	Labour	National Labour	Followed MacDonald on 31 August.
1931	Ernest Bennett	Labour	National Labour	Followed MacDonald on 1 September.
1931	George Knight	Labour	National Labour	Followed MacDonald on 2 September.
1931	James Lovat-Fraser	Labour	National Labour	Followed MacDonald on 2 September.
1931	Craigie Aitchison	Labour	National Labour	Followed MacDonald on 3 September.
1931	Samuel Rosbotham	Labour	National Labour	Followed MacDonald on 5 September.
1931	Archibald Church	Labour	National Labour	Followed MacDonald on 8 September.
1931	Richard Denman	Labour	National Labour	Followed MacDonald on 10 September.
1931	Sydney Frank Markham	Labour	National Labour	Followed MacDonald on 16 September.
1931	Derwent Hall Caine	Labour	National Labour	Followed MacDonald on 23 September.
=== 1931–1935 Parliament ===
February 1933	Harry Nathan	Liberal	Independent Liberals	Opposed the policy of the National Government.
November 1933	Robert Bernays	Liberal	Independent Liberal	Remained on the government benches when the Liberal Party went into opposition.
November 1933	Joseph Leckie	Liberal	National Liberal	Remained on the government benches when the Liberal Party went into opposition.
November 1933	William McKeag	Liberal	National Liberal	Remained on the government benches when the Liberal Party went into opposition.
November 1933	Joseph Maclay	Liberal	Independent Liberal	Remained on the government benches when the Liberal Party went into opposition.
August 1934	Harry Nathan	Independent Liberals	Labour	
=== 1935–1945 Parliament ===
July 1935	George Morrison	Liberal	National Liberal	
1935	Katharine Stewart-Murray, Duchess of Atholl	Conservative	Independent	Resigned whip over the India Bill and the "national-socialist tendency" of the government's domestic policy.
1935	Katharine Stewart-Murray, Duchess of Atholl	Independent	Conservative	
1937	Katharine Stewart-Murray, Duchess of Atholl	Conservative	Independent	Resigned whip over Anglo-Italian Agreement.
1937	Katharine Stewart-Murray, Duchess of Atholl	Independent	Conservative	
1938	Katharine Stewart-Murray, Duchess of Atholl	Conservative	Independent	Resigned a third time, due to opposing Neville Chamberlain's policy of appeasement of Adolf Hitler before being deselected by her local party.
September 1936	Robert Bernays	Independent Liberal	National Liberal	
1938	Herbert Holdsworth	Liberal	National Liberal	
November 1939	Aneurin Bevan	Labour	Independent	Expelled from the Labour Party for seven months for supporting a "popular front".
November 1939	Sir Stafford Cripps	Labour	Independent	Expelled from the Labour Party for seven months for supporting a "popular front".
November 1939	George Strauss	Labour	Independent	Expelled from the Labour Party for seven months for supporting a "popular front".
November 1939	Clement Davies	National Liberal	Independent	Resigned whips of both the Liberal Nationals and the National Government in opposition to Chamberlain.
1939	George Buchanan	Ind. Labour Party	Labour	Rejoined the Labour Party.
March 1940	Denis Pritt	Labour	Independent	Expelled from the Labour Party over his defence of the Soviet invasion of Finland.
1942	Murdoch Macdonald	National Liberal	Independent	
1942	Edgar Granville	National Liberal	Independent	
1942	Clement Davies	Independent	Liberal	Returned to the Liberal Party after a decade.
February 1942	Stephen King-Hall	National Labour	Independent	Opposed the party's considerations in wartime.
May 1942	Alec Cunningham-Reid	Conservative	Independent	Whip withdrawn after a dispute with the national Conservative leadership.
July 1942	Sir Richard Acland	Liberal	Common Wealth	Formed the Common Wealth Party after a merger of the 1941 Committee and the Forward March movement.
July 1942	Vernon Bartlett	Independent Progressive	Common Wealth	Fought the 1945 general election as an independent.
May 1943	Kenneth Lindsay	National Labour	Independent	
November 1944	John Eric Loverseed	Common Wealth	Independent	
February 1945	Sir Stafford Cripps	Independent	Labour	Rejoined the Labour Party.
April 1945	Edgar Granville	Independent	Liberal	
May 1945	John Eric Loverseed	Independent	Labour	
=== 1945–1950 Parliament ===
1945	John MacLeod	Independent Liberal	National Liberal	
22 April 1946	Ernest Millington	Common Wealth	Labour	
21 October 1946	Tom Horabin	Liberal	Independent	Declared support for the Labour government.
26 March 1947	John McGovern	Ind. Labour Party	Labour	
23 July 1947	Rev Campbell Stephen	Ind. Labour Party	Independent	Granted the Labour whip on 21 October 1947.
21 October 1947	Rev Campbell Stephen	Independent	Labour	Granted the Labour whip on 21 October 1947.
29 October 1947	James Carmichael	Ind. Labour Party	Independent	Granted the Labour whip on 3 November 1947.
3 November 1947	James Carmichael	Independent	Labour	Granted the Labour whip on 3 November 1947.
4 November 1947	Evelyn Walkden	Labour	Independent	Following censure by the House for his conduct.
18 November 1947	Tom Horabin	Independent	Labour	
22 March 1948	John Mackie	Independent	Conservative	
28 April 1948	John Platts-Mills	Labour	Independent	Expelled from party for sending supportive telegram to Pietro Nenni, Italian socialist allied with the Communists.
16 May 1948	Alfred Edwards	Labour	Conservative	Expelled from party for opposition to nationalisation of steel.
3 October 1948	Eric Gandar Dower	Conservative	Independent	Dispute with local association.
26 October 1948	Ivor Thomas	Labour	Conservative	Resigned due to opposition to nationalisation of steel.
28 October 1948	Gwilym Lloyd George	Liberal	Independent	Whip removed; Lloyd-George had been sitting on the Conservative front bench since 1945 but had continued to receive the Liberal whip "as a matter of courtesy".
18 May 1949	Leslie Solley	Labour	Independent	Expelled from party for persistently opposing government policies.
18 May 1949	Konni Zilliacus	Labour	Independent	Expelled from party for persistently opposing government policies.
27 July 1949	Lester Hutchinson	Labour	Independent	Expelled from party for opposition to government foreign policy.
=== 1950–1951 Parliament ===
4 May 1950	John MacLeod	Independent Liberal	National Liberal	
4 August 1950	Raymond Blackburn	Labour	Independent	Called for Winston Churchill to be Prime Minister in a coalition government.
=== 1951–1955 Parliament ===
2 June 1954	John Mellor	Conservative	Independent	Resigned whip over increase in MPs' salaries (Mellor was opposed).
14 July 1954	John Mellor	Independent	Conservative	
14 July 1954	Harry Legge-Bourke	Conservative	Independent	Opposed to policy of withdrawing British base in Suez canal zone.
18 October 1954	Harry Legge-Bourke	Independent	Conservative	
23 November 1954	S. O. Davies	Labour	Independent	Whip withdrawn after breaking the whip over German rearmament.
23 November 1954	George Craddock	Labour	Independent	Whip withdrawn after breaking the whip over German rearmament.
23 November 1954	Ernest Fernyhough	Labour	Independent	Whip withdrawn after breaking the whip over German rearmament.
23 November 1954	Emrys Hughes	Labour	Independent	Whip withdrawn after breaking the whip over German rearmament.
23 November 1954	Sydney Silverman	Labour	Independent	Whip withdrawn after breaking the whip over German rearmament.
23 November 1954	Victor Yates	Labour	Independent	Whip withdrawn after breaking the whip over German rearmament.
23 November 1954	John McGovern	Labour	Independent	Whip withdrawn after breaking the whip over German rearmament.
10 March 1955	Richard Acland	Labour	Independent	Opposed to party policy on nuclear arms and resigned his seat.
16 March 1955	Aneurin Bevan	Labour	Independent	Whip withdrawn for challenging the authority of Party leader.
April 1955	S. O. Davies	Independent	Labour	Whip restored.
April 1955	George Craddock	Independent	Labour	Whip restored.
April 1955	Ernest Fernyhough	Independent	Labour	Whip restored.
April 1955	Emrys Hughes	Independent	Labour	Whip restored.
April 1955	Sydney Silverman	Independent	Labour	Whip restored.
April 1955	Victor Yates	Independent	Labour	Whip restored.
April 1955	John McGovern	Independent	Labour	Whip restored.
28 April 1955	Aneurin Bevan	Independent	Labour	
=== 1955–1959 Parliament ===
8 November 1956	Cyril Banks	Conservative	Independent	Resigned whip over the Suez Crisis (Banks was friendly with Egypt). The whip was restored on 19 December 1958.
13 May 1957	Patrick Maitland	Conservative	Independent	Resigned whip over the Suez Crisis, wanting UK involvement in Suez to continue (whip restored 23 December 1957).
13 May 1957	John Biggs-Davison	Conservative	Independent	Resigned whip over the Suez Crisis, wanting UK involvement in Suez to continue (whip restored 11 July 1958).
13 May 1957	Anthony Fell	Conservative	Independent	Resigned whip over the Suez Crisis, wanting UK involvement in Suez to continue (whip restored 11 July 1958).
13 May 1957	Victor Montagu	Conservative	Independent	Resigned whip over the Suez Crisis, wanting UK involvement in Suez to continue (whip restored 11 July 1958).
13 May 1957	Lawrence Turner	Conservative	Independent	Resigned whip over the Suez Crisis, wanting UK involvement in Suez to continue (whip restored 11 July 1958).
13 May 1957	Paul Williams	Conservative	Independent	Resigned whip over the Suez Crisis, wanting UK involvement in Suez to continue (whip restored 11 July 1958).
13 May 1957	Angus Maude	Conservative	Independent	Resigned whip over the Suez Crisis, wanting UK involvement in Suez to continue and subsequently resigned their seat.
13 May 1957	Victor Raikes	Conservative	Independent	Resigned whip over the Suez Crisis, wanting UK involvement in Suez to continue and subsequently resigned their seat.
14 November 1957	Frank Medlicott	Conservative	Independent	Resigned whip over the Suez Crisis (Medlicott was opposed to the invasion). The whip was restored 21 November 1958.
30 January 1959	David Robertson	Conservative	Independent	Resigned whip over policy on the Scottish highlands.
=== 1959–1964 Parliament ===
16 March 1961	William Baxter	Labour	Independent	Whip withdrawn for voting against the defence estimates. The whip was restored on 29 May 1963.
16 March 1961	S. O. Davies	Labour	Independent	Whip withdrawn for voting against the defence estimates. The whip was restored on 29 May 1963.
16 March 1961	Michael Foot	Labour	Independent	Whip withdrawn for voting against the defence estimates. The whip was restored on 29 May 1963.
16 March 1961	Emrys Hughes	Labour	Independent	Whip withdrawn for voting against the defence estimates. The whip was restored on 29 May 1963.
16 March 1961	Sydney Silverman	Labour	Independent	Whip withdrawn for voting against the defence estimates. The whip was restored on 29 May 1963.
22 March 1961	Alan Brown	Labour	Independent	Opposed to party defence policy.
22 March 1961	Konni Zilliacus	Labour	Independent	Whip suspended until January 1962 for writing critical article in Communist publication.
19 October 1961	William Duthie	Conservative	Independent	Resigned whip over policy on salmon fishing industry. The whip was restored on 15 November 1963.
4 May 1962	Alan Brown	Independent	Conservative	
23 January 1964	Dr Donald Johnson	Conservative	Independent	Dispute with local party.
=== 1966–1970 Parliament ===
10 July 1966	Geoffrey Hirst	Conservative	Ind. Conservative	Failed to persuade party to vote against Prices and Incomes Bill.
8 December 1966	Reginald Paget	Labour	Independent	Resigned the whip because of opposition to United Nations sanctions on Rhodesia. The whip was restored on 15 June 1967.
10 January 1968	Julian Ridsdale	National Liberal	Conservative	Party disbanded.
10 January 1968	David Renton	National Liberal	Conservative	Party disbanded.
10 January 1968	Joan Vickers	National Liberal	Conservative	Party disbanded.
10 January 1968	John Nott	National Liberal	Conservative	Party disbanded.
18 January 1968	Desmond Donnelly	Labour	Independent	Opposed to defence cuts 'east of Suez'.
31 January 1968	Frank Allaun	Labour	Independent Labour	Whip suspended from 31 January 1968 to 29 February 1968.
31 January 1968	Norman Atkinson	Labour	Independent Labour	Whip suspended from 31 January 1968 to 29 February 1968.
31 January 1968	Albert Booth	Labour	Independent Labour	Whip suspended from 31 January 1968 to 29 February 1968.
31 January 1968	James Dickens	Labour	Independent Labour	Whip suspended from 31 January 1968 to 29 February 1968.
31 January 1968	S. O. Davies	Labour	Independent Labour	Whip suspended from 31 January 1968 to 29 February 1968.
31 January 1968	Michael Foot	Labour	Independent Labour	Whip suspended from 31 January 1968 to 29 February 1968.
31 January 1968	Will Griffiths	Labour	Independent Labour	Whip suspended from 31 January 1968 to 29 February 1968.
31 January 1968	Dr John Dunwoody	Labour	Independent Labour	Whip suspended from 31 January 1968 to 29 February 1968.
31 January 1968	Eric Heffer	Labour	Independent Labour	Whip suspended from 31 January 1968 to 29 February 1968.
31 January 1968	Willie Hamilton	Labour	Independent Labour	Whip suspended from 31 January 1968 to 29 February 1968.
31 January 1968	Emrys Hughes	Labour	Independent Labour	Whip suspended from 31 January 1968 to 29 February 1968.
31 January 1968	Peter Jackson	Labour	Independent Labour	Whip suspended from 31 January 1968 to 29 February 1968.
31 January 1968	Anne Kerr	Labour	Independent Labour	Whip suspended from 31 January 1968 to 29 February 1968.
31 January 1968	Russell Kerr	Labour	Independent Labour	Whip suspended from 31 January 1968 to 29 February 1968.
31 January 1968	Malcolm Macmillan	Labour	Independent Labour	Whip suspended from 31 January 1968 to 29 February 1968.
31 January 1968	John Mendelson	Labour	Independent Labour	Whip suspended from 31 January 1968 to 29 February 1968.
31 January 1968	Stanley Newens	Labour	Independent Labour	Whip suspended from 31 January 1968 to 29 February 1968.
31 January 1968	Christopher Norwood	Labour	Independent Labour	Whip suspended from 31 January 1968 to 29 February 1968.
31 January 1968	Stan Orme	Labour	Independent Labour	Whip suspended from 31 January 1968 to 29 February 1968.
31 January 1968	Trevor Park	Labour	Independent Labour	Whip suspended from 31 January 1968 to 29 February 1968.
31 January 1968	John Ryan	Labour	Independent Labour	Whip suspended from 31 January 1968 to 29 February 1968.
31 January 1968	Sydney Silverman	Labour	Independent Labour	Whip suspended from 31 January 1968 to 29 February 1968.
31 January 1968	Tom Swain	Labour	Independent Labour	Whip suspended from 31 January 1968 to 29 February 1968.
31 January 1968	Carol Johnson	Labour	Independent Labour	Whip suspended from 31 January 1968 to 29 February 1968.
May 1969	Desmond Donnelly	Independent	Democratic Party	Formed new party.
=== 1970–1974 Parliament ===
24 August 1970	Gerry Fitt	Republican Labour	SDLP	Formed new party.
October 1970	Bernadette Devlin	Unity	Independent	Declared that she would sit in Parliament as an independent socialist.
30 September 1971	Ian Paisley	Protestant Unionist	DUP	Protestant Unionists merged into new party.
16 February 1972	Ray Gunter	Labour	Independent Labour	Opposed to take-over of party by middle-class intellectuals.
6 October 1972	Dick Taverne	Labour	Democratic Labour	Dispute with local party. Simultaneously announced his intention to resign his seat and seek re-election.
18 December 1972	Stratton Mills	UUP	Conservative	Chose to remain an "independent unionist and Conservative" when the UUP withdrew from the Conservative whip.
29 April 1973	Stratton Mills	Conservative	Alliance	
=== 1974 Parliament ===
9 July 1974	Christopher Mayhew	Labour	Liberal	Believed Labour was too vulnerable to left takeover.
=== 1974–1979 Parliament ===
11 October 1975	John Dunlop	Vanguard	UUUP	Split with leadership over proposal for voluntary power-sharing in Northern Ireland.
24 October 1975	James Kilfedder	UUP	Ind. Unionist	Opposed to the growth of support for the full integration of Northern Ireland into the United Kingdom, remained committed to devolution.
19 November 1975	Robert Bradford	Vanguard	UUP	Opposed to power-sharing.
7 April 1976	John Stonehouse	Labour	Independent	Believed new Prime Minister James Callaghan did not have a mandate.
14 April 1976	John Stonehouse	Independent	English National	
26 July 1976	Jim Sillars	Labour	Scottish Labour	Resigned from Labour over public spending cuts.
26 July 1976	John Robertson	Labour	Scottish Labour	Resigned from Labour over public spending cuts.
8 October 1977	Reg Prentice	Labour	Conservative	Believed Labour should be defeated at the next election.
26 November 1977	William Craig	Vanguard	UUP	Party wound up.
=== 1979–1983 Parliament ===
22 November 1979	Gerry Fitt	SDLP	Independent Socialist	Dispute with party over talks process.
17 January 1980	James Kilfedder	Ind. Unionist	Ulster Progressive Unionist Party	Formed party (renamed 'Ulster Popular Unionist Party' in March 1980).
20 February 1981	Richard Crawshaw	Labour	SDP	Resigned whip prior to launch of new party, which he joined on 2 March 1981.
20 February 1981	Tom Ellis	Labour	SDP	Resigned whip prior to launch of new party, which he joined on 2 March 1981.
2 March 1981	Tom Bradley	Labour	SDP	Formed new party.
2 March 1981	John Cartwright	Labour	SDP	Formed new party.
2 March 1981	John Horam	Labour	SDP	Formed new party.
2 March 1981	Robert Maclennan	Labour	SDP	Formed new party.
2 March 1981	John Roper	Labour	SDP	Formed new party.
2 March 1981	David Owen	Labour	SDP	Formed new party.
2 March 1981	Bill Rodgers	Labour	SDP	Formed new party.
2 March 1981	Neville Sandelson	Labour	SDP	Formed new party.
2 March 1981	Mike Thomas	Labour	SDP	Formed new party.
2 March 1981	Ian Wrigglesworth	Labour	SDP	Formed new party.
16 March 1981	Christopher Brocklebank-Fowler	Conservative	SDP	
19 March 1981	Edward Lyons	Labour	SDP	
4 July 1981	James Wellbeloved	Labour	SDP	
7 September 1981	Michael O'Halloran	Labour	SDP	
1 October 1981	Dr Dickson Mabon	Labour	SDP	
5 October 1981	Bob Mitchell	Labour	SDP	
6 October 1981	David Ginsburg	Labour	SDP	
7 October 1981	James Dunn	Labour	SDP	
7 October 1981	Tom McNally	Labour	SDP	
29 October 1981	Eric Ogden	Labour	SDP	
16 November 1981	John Grant	Labour	SDP	
30 November 1981	George Cunningham	Labour	Independent Labour	
2 December 1981	Ronald Brown	Labour	SDP	Defected to the SDP.
11 December 1981	Bruce Douglas-Mann	Labour	Independent Labour	Subsequently, resigned his seat and restood unsuccessfully for the Social Democratic Party.
11 December 1981	Jeffrey Thomas	Labour	SDP	
11 December 1981	Ednyfed Hudson Davies	Labour	SDP	
22 January 1982	Bryan Magee	Labour	Independent Labour	
12 March 1982	Bryan Magee	Independent Labour	SDP	
16 June 1982	George Cunningham	Independent Labour	SDP	
2 August 1982	Robert Mellish	Labour	Independent Labour	Dispute with local party.
10 February 1983	Michael O'Halloran	SDP	Independent Labour	Not selected as a candidate for the subsequent election.
=== 1983–1987 Parliament ===
31 January 1987	John Ryman	Labour	Independent	
=== 1987–1992 Parliament ===
3 March 1988	All 17 Liberal MPs	Liberal	Liberal Democrats	Merger of the SDP and the Liberal Party as the "Social and Liberal Democrats", later Liberal Democrats.
3 March 1988	Robert Maclennan	SDP	Liberal Democrats	Merger of the SDP and the Liberal Party as the "Social and Liberal Democrats", later Liberal Democrats.
3 March 1988	Charles Kennedy	SDP	Liberal Democrats	Merger of the SDP and the Liberal Party as the "Social and Liberal Democrats", later Liberal Democrats.
3 March 1988	Rosie Barnes	SDP	SDP	Objected to the SDP's merger with the Liberal Party.
3 March 1988	John Cartwright	SDP	SDP	Objected to the SDP's merger with the Liberal Party.
3 March 1988	David Owen	SDP	SDP	Objected to the SDP's merger with the Liberal Party.
19 May 1988	Ron Brown	Labour	Independent	Whip suspended over misconduct.
19 August 1988	Ron Brown	Independent	Labour	Whip restored.
14 March 1990	Dick Douglas	Labour	Independent	Opposed to party acquiescence in administering the Poll Tax.
24 May 1990	Rosie Barnes	SDP	Independent	Continuing SDP dissolved, sat as independent Social Democrats.
24 May 1990	John Cartwright	SDP	Independent	Continuing SDP dissolved, sat as independent Social Democrats.
24 May 1990	David Owen	SDP	Independent	Continuing SDP dissolved, sat as independent Social Democrats.
4 October 1990	Dick Douglas	Independent	SNP	
25 September 1991	Dave Nellist	Labour	Independent	Whip suspended over links to the Militant tendency.
25 September 1991	Terry Fields	Labour	Independent	Whip suspended over links to the Militant tendency.
13 March 1992	John Browne	Conservative	Ind. Conservative	Whip removed for intention to stand against official candidate after he had been deselected.
=== 1992–1997 Parliament ===
23 July 1993	Rupert Allason	Conservative	Ind. Conservative	Whip suspended until 1 July 1994 after failing to back Conservative government in confidence motion.
29 November 1994	Nicholas Budgen	Conservative	Ind. Conservative	Whip suspended until 24 April 1995 after failing to back Conservative government in confidence motion.
29 November 1994	Michael Carttiss	Conservative	Ind. Conservative	Whip suspended until 24 April 1995 after failing to back Conservative government in confidence motion.
29 November 1994	Christopher Gill	Conservative	Ind. Conservative	Whip suspended until 24 April 1995 after failing to back Conservative government in confidence motion.
29 November 1994	Teresa Gorman	Conservative	Ind. Conservative	Whip suspended until 24 April 1995 after failing to back Conservative government in confidence motion.
29 November 1994	Antony Marlow	Conservative	Ind. Conservative	Whip suspended until 24 April 1995 after failing to back Conservative government in confidence motion.
29 November 1994	Richard Shepherd	Conservative	Ind. Conservative	Whip suspended until 24 April 1995 after failing to back Conservative government in confidence motion.
29 November 1994	Teddy Taylor	Conservative	Ind. Conservative	Whip suspended until 24 April 1995 after failing to back Conservative government in confidence motion.
29 November 1994	John Wilkinson	Conservative	Ind. Conservative	Whip suspended until 24 April 1995 after failing to back Conservative government in confidence motion.
29 November 1994	Richard Body	Conservative	Ind. Conservative	Whip suspended until 24 April 1995 after failing to back Conservative government in confidence motion.
7 October 1995	Alan Howarth	Conservative	Labour	
29 December 1995	Emma Nicholson	Conservative	Liberal Democrats	Resigned saying "The Conservative Party has changed so much, while my principles have not changed at all. I would argue that it is not so much a case of my leaving the party, but the party leaving me."
24 February 1996	Peter Thurnham	Conservative	Independent	Resigned over dismay at the Scott Report and the Nolan Report.
13 October 1996	Peter Thurnham	Independent	Liberal Democrats	
8 March 1997	George Gardiner	Conservative	Referendum	Resigned after being deselected by local Conservative association.
=== 1997–2001 Parliament ===
21 November 1997	Peter Temple-Morris	Conservative	Independent	Whip removed due to questioned commitment to the Party.
21 June 1998	Peter Temple-Morris	Independent	Labour	
9 September 1998	Tommy Graham	Labour	Independent	Expelled from Party over misconduct.
26 March 1999	Dennis Canavan	Labour	Independent	Expelled from Party after decision to stand for Scottish Parliament against official candidate.
18 December 1999	Shaun Woodward	Conservative	Labour	Direction of party under William Hague.
6 March 2000	Ken Livingstone	Labour	Independent	Expelled from Party after decision to stand for Mayor of London against official candidate.
11 April 2001	Charles Wardle	Conservative	Independent	Whip removed after rumours of support for Independent candidate in forthcoming general election.
=== 2001–2005 Parliament ===
10 December 2001	Paul Marsden	Labour	Liberal Democrats	Left Labour over the war in Afghanistan.
2 October 2002	Andrew Hunter	Conservative	Ind. Conservative	Resigned whip in order to ally with the Democratic Unionist Party in Northern Ireland.
23 June 2003	David Burnside	UUP	Ind. Unionist	Resigned whip over opposition to the Belfast Agreement. Accepted the whip back on 9 January 2004.
23 June 2003	Martin Smyth	UUP	Ind. Unionist	Resigned whip over opposition to the Belfast Agreement. Accepted the whip back on 9 January 2004.
23 June 2003	Jeffrey Donaldson	UUP	Ind. Unionist	Resigned whip over opposition to the Belfast Agreement.
23 October 2003	George Galloway	Labour	Independent	Expelled from Party after being found guilty of "bringing the party into disrepute".
9 January 2004	Jeffrey Donaldson	Ind. Unionist	DUP	Joined DUP.
25 January 2004	George Galloway	Independent	Respect	
25 January 2004	Ann Winterton	Conservative	Independent	Whip suspended over misconduct for telling a joke which alluded to the recent death of 23 illegal immigrant Chinese cockle-pickers in Morecambe Bay.
31 March 2004	Ann Winterton	Independent	Conservative	Whip restored for apologising.
10 December 2004	Andrew Hunter	Ind. Conservative	DUP	
15 January 2005	Robert Jackson	Conservative	Labour	Disagreement with party over higher education funding.
3 February 2005	Jonathan Sayeed	Conservative	Independent	Whip suspended until 7 March 2005 over misconduct.
7 March 2005	Jonathan Sayeed	Independent	Conservative	.
18 March 2005	Jonathan Sayeed	Conservative	Independent	Whip withdrawn over misconduct.
25 March 2005	Howard Flight	Conservative	Independent	Whip withdrawn over controversial policy remarks.
6 April 2005	Paul Marsden	Liberal Democrats	Independent Labour	Declared support for Labour Party to win the impending general election.
25 April 2005	Brian Sedgemore	Labour	Liberal Democrats	Unhappy with the direction Labour were heading. Although this was one week before the election, Parliament had been dissolved on 11 April and Sedgemore was no longer a sitting MP.
=== 2005–2010 Parliament ===
20 October 2006	Clare Short	Labour	Independent	Resigned whip. Declared support for a hung parliament at the next election.
26 June 2007	Quentin Davies	Conservative	Labour	Criticised the direction of the Conservative Party under leadership of David Cameron.
16 September 2007	Robert Wareing	Labour	Independent	Resigned whip after failing in a bid for reselection.
25 September 2007	Andrew Pelling	Conservative	Independent	Whip suspended pending the conclusion of an investigation into the accusations he assaulted his wife, a case which was then dropped by the CPS.
29 January 2008	Derek Conway	Conservative	Independent	Whip suspended pending the conclusion of an investigation into the accusations he misused his Parliamentary Allowances.
12 March 2008	Bob Spink	Conservative	Independent	Resigned from the Conservatives after disagreements with the party.
22 April 2008	Bob Spink	Independent	UKIP	Joined UK Independence Party (UKIP).
November 2008	Bob Spink	UKIP	Independent	Re-designated Independent stating he had never been a full member.
9 January 2010	Iris Robinson	DUP	Independent	Expelled from the DUP.
8 February 2010	David Chaytor	Labour	Independent	Whip suspended over the United Kingdom Parliamentary expenses scandal after criminal charges of false accounting were brought.
8 February 2010	Jim Devine	Labour	Independent	Whip suspended over the United Kingdom Parliamentary expenses scandal after criminal charges of false accounting were brought.
8 February 2010	Elliot Morley	Labour	Independent	Whip suspended over the United Kingdom Parliamentary expenses scandal after criminal charges of false accounting were brought.
25 March 2010	Sylvia, Lady Hermon	UUP	Independent	Resigned from party due to opposition to the electoral pact between the Ulster Unionists and the Conservative Party.
=== 2010–2015 Parliament ===
19 May 2010	Eric Illsley	Labour	Independent	Whip suspended over the United Kingdom Parliamentary expenses scandal after criminal charges of false accounting were brought.
14 October 2010	Denis MacShane	Labour	Independent	Whip suspended over the United Kingdom Parliamentary expenses scandal.
23 February 2012	Eric Joyce	Labour	Independent	Whip suspended after drunkenly assaulting fellow politicians, including Stuart Andrew and Phil Wilson, on the parliamentary estate.
5 July 2012	Denis MacShane	Independent	Labour	Retakes the whip after police decide not prosecute him over the United Kingdom Parliamentary expenses scandal.
2 November 2012	Denis MacShane	Labour	Independent	Whip suspended after being found to have submitted false invoices for expenses during the United Kingdom Parliamentary expenses scandal.
4 November 2012	Nadine Dorries	Conservative	Independent	Whip removed after taking part in I'm a Celebrity...Get Me Out of Here!.
4 February 2013	Chris Huhne	Liberal Democrats	Independent	Suspended from the party after pleading guilty to perverting the course of justice.
8 May 2013	Nadine Dorries	Independent	Conservative	Whip returned.
31 May 2013	Patrick Mercer	Conservative	Independent	Resigned the Conservative Party whip after an ongoing enquiry regarding allegations relating to lobbying.
4 June 2013	Mike Hancock	Liberal Democrats	Independent	Resigned from the Liberal Democrats after allegations of sexual offences were made against him.
19 July 2013	David Ward	Liberal Democrats	Independent	Whip withdrawn over anti Israel remarks.
10 September 2013	Nigel Evans	Conservative	Independent	Resigned from the Conservatives after allegations of sexual offences were made against him.
19 September 2013	David Ward	Independent	Liberal Democrats	Received whip back.
10 April 2014	Nigel Evans	Independent	Conservative	Found not guilty on all charges, so returned to the Conservative benches.
28 August 2014	Douglas Carswell	Conservative	UKIP	Defected and resigned as MP, triggering by-election which he won.
27 September 2014	Mark Reckless	Conservative	UKIP	Defected and resigned as MP, triggering by-election which he won.
22 February 2015	Jack Straw	Labour	Independent	Whip withdrawn after being secretly filmed apparently offering his services to a private company for cash.
23 February 2015	Sir Malcolm Rifkind	Conservative	Independent	Whip withdrawn after being secretly filmed apparently offering his services to a private company for cash.
=== 2015–2017 Parliament ===
29 September 2015	Michelle Thomson	SNP	Independent	Resigned whip over allegations of mortgage fraud.
24 November 2015	Natalie McGarry	SNP	Independent	Resigned whip over allegations of funds going missing from the accounts of Women for Independence.
28 December 2015	Simon Danczuk	Labour	Independent	Suspended from the Labour Party following allegations of sending sexually explicit text messages to a 17-year-old girl.
27 April 2016	Naz Shah	Labour	Independent	Suspended from the Labour Party following allegations of making anti-semitic remarks.
5 July 2016	Naz Shah	Independent	Labour	Suspension overturned and reinstated to party after apologizing for remarks made.
25 March 2017	Douglas Carswell	UKIP	Independent	Left UKIP after internal disagreements and became an independent MP
=== 2017–2019 Parliament ===
10 July 2017	Anne Marie Morris	Conservative	Independent	Suspended pending investigation over racist remarks alleged.
25 October 2017	Jared O'Mara	Labour	Independent	Suspended pending investigation over sexist and homophobic comments.
2 November 2017	Kelvin Hopkins	Labour	Independent	Suspended pending investigation due to sexual assault allegations.
3 November 2017	Charlie Elphicke	Conservative	Independent	Suspended pending investigation due to sexual assault allegations.
23 November 2017	Ivan Lewis	Labour	Independent	Suspended pending investigation due to sexual assault allegations.
12 December 2017	Anne Marie Morris	Independent	Conservative	Re-admitted into the party.
8 January 2018	Barry McElduff	Sinn Féin	Independent	Suspended over a joke seen as mocking IRA victims.
30 April 2018	John Woodcock	Labour	Independent	Suspended pending investigation due to sexual assault allegations.
3 July 2018	Jared O'Mara	Independent	Labour	Re-admitted into the party.
12 July 2018	Jared O'Mara	Labour	Independent	Resigned from the Labour Party.
14 July 2018	Andrew Griffiths	Conservative	Independent	Suspended following sexting controversy.
24 July 2018	Ian Paisley Jr	DUP	Independent	Suspended from party after failing to declare visits to Sri Lanka.
30 August 2018	Frank Field	Labour	Independent	Resigned from the Labour Party in protest over anti-semitism and bullying within Labour.
21 November 2018	Ian Paisley Jr	Independent	DUP	Suspension lifted and whip restored.
6 December 2018	Stephen Lloyd	Liberal Democrats	Independent	Resigned from the Liberal Democrat whip over their call for a second EU referendum.
12 December 2018	Charlie Elphicke	Independent	Conservative	Whip restored to support May's Government in a vote of no confidence.
12 December 2018	Andrew Griffiths	Independent	Conservative	Whip restored to support May's Government in a vote of no confidence.
19 December 2018	Fiona Onasanya	Labour	Independent	Suspended, and later expelled, from the party after being convicted of perverting the course of justice.
18 February 2019	Luciana Berger	Labour Co-op	Change UK	Formed new group.
18 February 2019	Ann Coffey	Labour	Change UK	Formed new group.
18 February 2019	Mike Gapes	Labour Co-op	Change UK	Formed new group.
18 February 2019	Chris Leslie	Labour Co-op	Change UK	Formed new group.
18 February 2019	Gavin Shuker	Labour Co-op	Change UK	Formed new group.
18 February 2019	Angela Smith	Labour	Change UK	Formed new group.
18 February 2019	Chuka Umunna	Labour	Change UK	Formed new group.
19 February 2019	Joan Ryan	Labour	Change UK	Joined new group.
20 February 2019	Heidi Allen	Conservative	Change UK	Joined new group.
20 February 2019	Anna Soubry	Conservative	Change UK	Joined new group.
20 February 2019	Sarah Wollaston	Conservative	Change UK	Joined new group.
22 February 2019	Ian Austin	Labour	Independent	Resigned from the Labour Party in protest over alleged anti-semitism and bullying within Labour.
27 February 2019	Chris Williamson	Labour	Independent	Suspended from the Labour Party as he claimed that the party was too apologetic over anti-semitism.
1 April 2019	Nick Boles	Conservative	Independent	Resigned the Conservative Party whip over Brexit, taking the label "Independent Progressive Conservative".
4 June 2019	Heidi Allen	Change UK	Independent	Resigned from Change UK.
4 June 2019	Luciana Berger	Change UK	Independent	Resigned from Change UK.
4 June 2019	Gavin Shuker	Change UK	Independent	Resigned from Change UK.
4 June 2019	Angela Smith	Change UK	Independent	Resigned from Change UK.
4 June 2019	Chuka Umunna	Change UK	Independent	Resigned from Change UK.
4 June 2019	Sarah Wollaston	Change UK	Independent	Resigned from Change UK.
13 June 2019	Chuka Umunna	Independent	Liberal Democrats	Joined the Liberal Democrats.
26 June 2019	Chris Williamson	Independent	Labour	Reinstated by party.
28 June 2019	Chris Williamson	Labour	Independent	Suspended again.
10 July 2019	Heidi Allen	Independent	The Independents	Formed new group.
10 July 2019	Luciana Berger	Independent	The Independents	Formed new group.
10 July 2019	Gavin Shuker	Independent	The Independents	Formed new group.
10 July 2019	Angela Smith	Independent	The Independents	Formed new group.
10 July 2019	John Woodcock	Independent	The Independents	Formed new group.
22 July 2019	Charlie Elphicke	Conservative	Independent	Suspended once again after being charged with sexual assault.
14 August 2019	Sarah Wollaston	Independent	Liberal Democrats	Joined the Liberal Democrats.
3 September 2019	Phillip Lee	Conservative	Liberal Democrats	Physically crossed the floor during a statement by prime minister Boris Johnson to join the Liberal Democrats.
3 September 2019	Guto Bebb	Conservative	Independent	Suspended from the party over defying whip during vote against no-deal Brexit.
3 September 2019	Richard Benyon	Conservative	Independent	Suspended from the party over defying whip during vote against no-deal Brexit.
3 September 2019	Steve Brine	Conservative	Independent	Suspended from the party over defying whip during vote against no-deal Brexit.
3 September 2019	Alistair Burt	Conservative	Independent	Suspended from the party over defying whip during vote against no-deal Brexit.
3 September 2019	Greg Clark	Conservative	Independent	Suspended from the party over defying whip during vote against no-deal Brexit.
3 September 2019	Kenneth Clarke	Conservative	Independent	Suspended from the party over defying whip during vote against no-deal Brexit.
3 September 2019	David Gauke	Conservative	Independent	Suspended from the party over defying whip during vote against no-deal Brexit.
3 September 2019	Justine Greening	Conservative	Independent	Suspended from the party over defying whip during vote against no-deal Brexit.
3 September 2019	Dominic Grieve	Conservative	Independent	Suspended from the party over defying whip during vote against no-deal Brexit.
3 September 2019	Sam Gyimah	Conservative	Independent	Suspended from the party over defying whip during vote against no-deal Brexit.
3 September 2019	Philip Hammond	Conservative	Independent	Suspended from the party over defying whip during vote against no-deal Brexit.
3 September 2019	Stephen Hammond	Conservative	Independent	Suspended from the party over defying whip during vote against no-deal Brexit.
3 September 2019	Richard Harrington	Conservative	Independent	Suspended from the party over defying whip during vote against no-deal Brexit.
3 September 2019	Margot James	Conservative	Independent	Suspended from the party over defying whip during vote against no-deal Brexit.
3 September 2019	Sir Oliver Letwin	Conservative	Independent	Suspended from the party over defying whip during vote against no-deal Brexit.
3 September 2019	Anne Milton	Conservative	Independent	Suspended from the party over defying whip during vote against no-deal Brexit.
3 September 2019	Caroline Nokes	Conservative	Independent	Suspended from the party over defying whip during vote against no-deal Brexit.
3 September 2019	Antoinette Sandbach	Conservative	Independent	Suspended from the party over defying whip during vote against no-deal Brexit.
3 September 2019	Sir Nicholas Soames	Conservative	Independent	Suspended from the party over defying whip during vote against no-deal Brexit.
3 September 2019	Rory Stewart	Conservative	Independent	Suspended from the party over defying whip during vote against no-deal Brexit.
3 September 2019	Ed Vaizey	Conservative	Independent	Suspended from the party over defying whip during vote against no-deal Brexit.
5 September 2019	Luciana Berger	The Independents	Liberal Democrats	
7 September 2019	Amber Rudd	Conservative	Independent	Resigned from the Cabinet and surrendered the Conservative whip.
7 September 2019	Angela Smith	The Independents	Liberal Democrats	Joined the Liberal Democrats.
14 September 2019	Sam Gyimah	Independent	Liberal Democrats	Joined the Liberal Democrats.
22 September 2019	Mike Hill	Labour	Independent	Suspended from the party over allegations of sexual assault.
7 October 2019	Stephen Hepburn	Labour	Independent	Suspended from the party over allegations of sexual assault.
7 October 2019	Heidi Allen	The Independents	Liberal Democrats	Joined the Liberal Democrats.
16 October 2019	Louise Ellman	Labour	Independent	Resigned from Labour in protest over Jeremy Corbyn.
21 October 2019	Mike Hill	Independent	Labour	Reinstated after allegations of sexual harassment were dropped.
29 October 2019	Alistair Burt	Independent	Conservative	Whip restored.
29 October 2019	Caroline Nokes	Independent	Conservative	Whip restored.
29 October 2019	Greg Clark	Independent	Conservative	Whip restored.
29 October 2019	Sir Nicholas Soames	Independent	Conservative	Whip restored.
29 October 2019	Ed Vaizey	Independent	Conservative	Whip restored.
29 October 2019	Margot James	Independent	Conservative	Whip restored.
29 October 2019	Richard Benyon	Independent	Conservative	Whip restored.
29 October 2019	Steve Brine	Independent	Conservative	Whip restored.
29 October 2019	Stephen Hammond	Independent	Conservative	Whip restored.
29 October 2019	Richard Harrington	Independent	Conservative	Whip restored.
29 October 2019	Stephen Lloyd	Independent	Liberal Democrats	Rejoined the Liberal Democrats.
31 October 2019	Antoinette Sandbach	Independent	Liberal Democrats	Joined the Liberal Democrats.
=== 2019–2024 Parliament ===
13 December 2019	Neale Hanvey	SNP	Independent	Whip suspended from party over anti-semitic social media posts during election campaign.
23 May 2020	Jonathan Edwards	Plaid Cymru	Independent	Whip suspended after being arrested on suspicion of assault.
2 June 2020	Neale Hanvey	Independent	SNP	Re-admitted to the party after a 6-month suspension.
15 July 2020	Julian Lewis	Conservative	Independent	Whip suspended after "working with Labour and other opposition MPs for his own advantage".
28 September 2020	Claudia Webbe	Labour	Independent	Whip suspended, and later expelled from party, over allegations of harassment.
1 October 2020	Margaret Ferrier	SNP	Independent	Whip suspended from party after breaking COVID-19 travel restrictions.
29 October 2020	Jeremy Corbyn	Labour	Independent	Whip suspended from party for comments made after the release of a report that found the Labour Party under his leadership allowed anti-semitism and harassment of Jewish members. Reinstated to the party on 17 November 2020 but whip not restored by Sir Keir Starmer.
30 December 2020	Julian Lewis	Independent	Conservative	
27 March 2021	Kenny MacAskill	SNP	Alba	Resigned from the SNP to join the newly established Alba Party.
28 March 2021	Neale Hanvey	SNP	Alba	
25 May 2021	Rob Roberts	Conservative	Independent	
18 June 2021	Imran Ahmad Khan	Conservative	Independent	Whip withdrawn after being charged on suspicion of a sexual offence of groping a 15-year-old boy
12 January 2022	Anne Marie Morris	Conservative	Independent	Whip withdrawn after rebelling against the government on an opposition day motion to cut VAT on energy bills.
19 January 2022	Christian Wakeford	Conservative	Labour	Resigned from the Conservative Party and joined the Labour Party after expressing no-confidence in Boris Johnson, as result of his actions following revelations over drinking and partying in Downing Street during the UK's lockdowns.
11 February 2022	Neil Coyle	Labour	Independent	Whip suspended, following allegations of making racist comments to a journalist.
2 April 2022	David Warburton	Conservative	Independent	Whip suspended following allegations of sexual assault and possession of cocaine.
29 April 2022	Neil Parish	Conservative	Independent	Whip suspended following allegations of watching pornography whilst in the Commons.
12 May 2022	Anne Marie Morris	Independent	Conservative	
26 June 2022	Patrick Grady	SNP	Independent	Resigned from the SNP following allegations of sexual assault, after apologising for sexual advances.
1 July 2022	Christopher Pincher	Conservative	Independent	Whip suspended following an investigation of him drunkenly groping two men.
19 July 2022	Tobias Ellwood	Conservative	Independent	Whip suspended for missing a confidence vote on Boris Johnson's government.
7 September 2022	Nick Brown	Labour	Independent	Whip suspended, following a complaint that had been made against him.
27 September 2022	Rupa Huq	Labour	Independent	Whip suspended, after being accused of making a racist comment about Chancellor Kwasi Kwarteng at the Labour conference.
7 October 2022	Conor Burns	Conservative	Independent	Whip suspended after being sacked over an allegation of serious misconduct.
13 October 2022	Christina Rees	Labour	Independent	Whip suspended, after allegations of bullying her constituency staff.
14 October 2022	Tobias Ellwood	Independent	Conservative	
21 October 2022	Chris Matheson	Labour	Independent	Whip suspended, after allegations of sexual misconduct.
1 November 2022	Matt Hancock	Conservative	Independent	Whip suspended after taking part in I'm a Celebrity...Get Me Out of Here!.
3 December 2022	Conor Burns	Independent	Conservative	
7 December 2022	Julian Knight	Conservative	Independent	Whip suspended after a complaint about him was made to the Metropolitan Police.
7 December 2022	Conor McGinn	Labour	Independent	Whip suspended and was suspended from the Labour Party pending the investigation of a complaint.
29 December 2022	Patrick Grady	Independent	SNP	
11 January 2023	Andrew Bridgen	Conservative	Independent	Whip suspended after spreading misinformation about COVID-19 vaccination.
3 March 2023	Rupa Huq	Independent	Labour	
5 April 2023	Scott Benton	Conservative	Independent	Whip suspended after admitting to lobbying ministers following a sting by The Times.
23 April 2023	Diane Abbott	Labour	Independent	Whip suspended after remarks made in The Observer.
10 May 2023	Andrew Bridgen	Independent	Reclaim	Joined the Reclaim Party.
24 May 2023	Neil Coyle	Independent	Labour	Whip restored.
1 June 2023	Geraint Davies	Labour	Independent	Whip suspended following complaints of "unacceptable behaviour".
9 June 2023	Bambos Charalambous	Labour	Independent	Whip suspended after a complaint was made against him.
5 July 2023	Angus MacNeil	SNP	Independent	Whip suspended for a week following a row with the party's chief whip.
12 October 2023	Lisa Cameron	SNP	Conservative	Defected to the Conservative Party amid a selection contest citing 'toxic and bullying' treatment from colleagues.
18 October 2023	Peter Bone	Conservative	Independent	Whip suspended after an investigation found that he had bullied staff and was sexually inappropriate towards a former member of staff.
26 October 2023	Crispin Blunt	Conservative	Independent	Whip suspended after being arrested on suspicion of rape and possession of drugs.
30 October 2023	Andy McDonald	Labour	Independent	Whip suspended for making “deeply offensive” remarks made at a speech during a pro-Palestine rally.
4 November 2023	Bob Stewart	Conservative	Independent	Surrendered the whip after being found guilty of racially abusing an activist.
20 December 2023	Andrew Bridgen	Reclaim	Independent	Left the Reclaim Party.
5 January 2024	Chris Skidmore	Conservative	Independent	Left the Conservative Party and resigned as an MP, triggering a by-election, over the governmental decision to allow more oil and gas fracking licences.
28 January 2024	Kate Osamor	Labour	Independent	Whip suspended following comments made that the events in Gaza should be remembered on Holocaust Memorial Day.
1 February 2024	Christina Rees	Independent	Labour	Whip restored, following an apology.
24 February 2024	Lee Anderson	Conservative	Independent	Whip suspended for making Islamaphobic comments about Sadiq Khan, and refusing to apologise for them.
11 March 2024	Lee Anderson	Independent	Reform	Joined Reform UK following suspension from Conservative Party.
13 March 2024	Andy McDonald	Independent	Labour	Labour Whip restored following investigation over use of controversial phrase.
29 March 2024	Jeffrey Donaldson	DUP	Independent	Party membership suspended following charges of historic sex offences.
9 April 2024	William Wragg	Conservative	Independent	Resigned Tory Whip following the leaking of fellow MP's personal numbers following the sharing of explicit images through a dating app.
12 April 2024	Bambos Charalambous	Independent	Labour	Whip restored following results of investigation.
17 April 2024	Mark Menzies	Conservative	Independent	Whip removed pending investigation of allegations of misuse of campaign funds.
27 April 2024	Dan Poulter	Conservative	Labour	Defected to Labour, describing the Conservatives as "a nationalist party of the right" which "no longer prioritises the NHS".
8 May 2024	Natalie Elphicke	Conservative	Labour	Defected to Labour, describing Sunak's government as "tired and chaotic".
8 May 2024	Kate Osamor	Independent	Labour	Labour Whip restored following results of investigation.
24 May 2024	Matt Hancock	Independent	Conservative	Conservative Whip restored shortly after election called.
24 May 2024	Bob Stewart	Independent	Conservative	Conservative Whip restored shortly after election called.
27 May 2024	Lucy Allan	Conservative	Independent	Tory Whip removed after publicly stating the endorsement of another party's candidate.
28 May 2024	Diane Abbott	Independent	Labour	Labour Whip restored shortly after election called.
=== 2024–present Parliament ===
23 July 2024	Apsana Begum	Labour	Independent	Whip suspended from party after rebelling against the government on an amendment to scrap the two-child benefit cap. Sultana subsequently resigned from the party in July 2025.
23 July 2024	Richard Burgon	Labour	Independent	Whip suspended from party after rebelling against the government on an amendment to scrap the two-child benefit cap. Sultana subsequently resigned from the party in July 2025.
23 July 2024	Ian Byrne	Labour	Independent	Whip suspended from party after rebelling against the government on an amendment to scrap the two-child benefit cap. Sultana subsequently resigned from the party in July 2025.
23 July 2024	Imran Hussain	Labour	Independent	Whip suspended from party after rebelling against the government on an amendment to scrap the two-child benefit cap. Sultana subsequently resigned from the party in July 2025.
23 July 2024	Rebecca Long-Bailey	Labour	Independent	Whip suspended from party after rebelling against the government on an amendment to scrap the two-child benefit cap. Sultana subsequently resigned from the party in July 2025.
23 July 2024	John McDonnell	Labour	Independent	Whip suspended from party after rebelling against the government on an amendment to scrap the two-child benefit cap. Sultana subsequently resigned from the party in July 2025.
23 July 2024	Zarah Sultana	Labour	Independent	Whip suspended from party after rebelling against the government on an amendment to scrap the two-child benefit cap. Sultana subsequently resigned from the party in July 2025.
28 September 2024	Rosie Duffield	Labour	Independent	Resigned the Labour Whip following criticism of Keir Starmer, citing "cruel and unnecessary" policies, the treatment of Diane Abbott, and the "sleaze" allegations against Starmer and other Labour ministers.
27 October 2024	Mike Amesbury	Labour	Independent	Whip suspended from party after being caught on CCTV punching a man.
5 February 2025	Richard Burgon	Independent	Labour	Whip restored to four of the seven MPs who rebelled against the government in July.
5 February 2025	Ian Byrne	Independent	Labour	Whip restored to four of the seven MPs who rebelled against the government in July.
5 February 2025	Imran Hussain	Independent	Labour	Whip restored to four of the seven MPs who rebelled against the government in July.
5 February 2025	Rebecca Long-Bailey	Independent	Labour	Whip restored to four of the seven MPs who rebelled against the government in July.
8 February 2025	Andrew Gwynne	Labour	Independent	Whip suspended from party over membership of WhatsApp group containing offensive and abusive messages that insulted constituents, fellow MPs and councillors.
10 February 2025	Oliver Ryan	Labour	Independent	Whip suspended from party over membership of WhatsApp group containing offensive and abusive messages that insulted constituents, fellow MPs and councillors.
7 March 2025	Rupert Lowe	Reform	Independent	Whip suspended from party after accusations of misogynistic behaviour and threatening physical violence against the party chairman.
5 April 2025	Dan Norris	Labour	Independent	Suspended from the Labour Party following allegations of rape, child sex offences, child abduction and misconduct in public office.
13 May 2025	Patrick Spencer	Conservative	Independent	Suspended from the Conservative Party after being charged with two counts of sexual assault.
5 July 2025	James McMurdock	Reform	Independent	Resigned Reform UK whip ahead of pending allegations of business impropriety.
16 July 2025	Neil Duncan-Jordan	Labour	Independent	Whip suspended from party after rebelling against the government on its welfare reform bill.
16 July 2025	Brian Leishman	Labour	Independent	Whip suspended from party after rebelling against the government on its welfare reform bill.
16 July 2025	Chris Hinchliff	Labour	Independent	Whip suspended from party after rebelling against the government on its welfare reform bill.
16 July 2025	Rachael Maskell	Labour	Independent	Whip suspended from party after rebelling against the government on its welfare reform bill.
17 July 2025	Diane Abbott	Labour	Independent	Whip suspended from party after BBC interview where she stated she did not regret previous comments that had caused a temporary suspension.
1 September 2025	Oliver Ryan	Independent	Labour	Whip restored.
15 September 2025	Danny Kruger	Conservative	Reform	Resigned from the Conservative Party and joined Reform UK.
26 September 2025	John McDonnell	Independent	Labour	Whip restored.
26 September 2025	Apsana Begum	Independent	Labour	Whip restored.
7 November 2025	Neil Duncan-Jordan	Independent	Labour	Whip restored.
7 November 2025	Brian Leishman	Independent	Labour	Whip restored.
7 November 2025	Chris Hinchliff	Independent	Labour	Whip restored.
7 November 2025	Rachael Maskell	Independent	Labour	Whip restored.
18 November 2025	Zarah Sultana	Independent	Your Party	Officially joined Your Party, the political party that she founded with Jeremy Corbyn on 3 July 2025.
3 December 2025	Markus Campbell-Savours	Labour	Independent	Whip suspended for voting against the family farm tax.
15 January 2026	Robert Jenrick	Conservative	Reform	Expelled from the Conservative Party because of "clear, irrefutable evidence" that he intended to join Reform UK, which he later did the same day.
18 January 2026	Andrew Rosindell	Conservative	Reform	Resigned from the Conservative Party and joined Reform UK.
26 January 2026	Suella Braverman	Conservative	Reform	Resigned from the Conservative Party and joined Reform UK.
5 March 2026	Joani Reid	Labour	Independent	Voluntarily suspended party whip after her husband was arrested on suspicion of spying for China.
6 March 2026	Markus Campbell-Savours	Independent	Labour	Whip restored
22 March 2026	Rupert Lowe	Independent	Restore	Party founded by Rupert Lowe registered, and he became its first MP on the same day.
31 March 2026	Karl Turner	Labour	Independent	Whip suspended after a series of interventions criticising the Prime Minister.
10 June 2026	Jeremy Corbyn	Independent	Your Party	After sitting as an independent MP since his 2024 election, officially joined Your Party, the political party that he founded with Zarah Sultana on 3 July 2025.
18 June 2026	Cameron Thomas	Liberal Democrats	Independent	Whip suspended pending the outcome of a police investigation.
17 July 2026	Patrick Spencer	Independent	Conservative	Whip restored after he was found not guilty of sexual assault.
30 July 2026	Diane Abbott	Independent	Labour	Whip restored.
30 July 2026	Joani Reid	Independent	Labour	Whip restored.
17 August 2026	Bayo Alaba	Labour	Independent	Whip suspended pending a government investigation into COVID business loan fraud.
20 October 2026	Perran Moon	Labour	Independent	Whip suspended amidst allegations of attempting to not repay his Covid-19 pandemic loan.
21 October 2026	Karl Turner	Independent	Labour	Whip restored
2 November 2026	Carla Lockhart	DUP	Ind. Unionist	Left DUP when the party leadership did not withdraw from the Northern Ireland Executive due to Michelle O'Neill, the First Minister, attending Drumcree parade protests.

== Members of Parliament who were suspended from their parliamentary party ==
These MPs were suspended by their Parliamentary Parties but continued to receive the Whip.

Date	Member	Party	Notes
22 March 2010	Patricia Hewitt	Labour	Suspended over the allegations from the 2010 Cash for Influence Scandal.
22 March 2010	Geoff Hoon	Labour	Suspended over the allegations from the 2010 Cash for Influence Scandal.
22 March 2010	Stephen Byers	Labour	Suspended over the allegations from the 2010 Cash for Influence Scandal.
22 March 2010	Margaret Moran	Labour	Suspended over the allegations from the 2010 Cash for Influence Scandal.
5 November 2010	Phil Woolas	Labour	Suspended after being found to have breached the Representation of the People Act 1983; his 2010 general election victory was declared void and he was barred from holding public office for 3 years.

== Members of the House of Lords who have changed party affiliation ==
The House of Lords is not a popularly elected body.

Date	Member	Before	After	Notes
=== 1700–present ===
1703	John Campbell, 2nd Duke of Argyll	Tory	Whig	Critic of the Tories.
1710	Richard Savage, 4th Earl Rivers	Whig	Tory	
1711	John Ashburnham, 1st Earl of Ashburnham	Tory	Whig	
1783	Augustus Keppel, 1st Viscount Keppel	Whig	Independent	Resigned as a protest against the Peace of Paris.
1793	William Fitzwilliam, 4th Earl Fitzwilliam	Whig	Independent	Resigned over disagreements with the party over involvement in the French Revolutionary Wars.
1793	William Cavendish-Bentinck, 3rd Duke of Portland	Whig	Independent	
1794	William Cavendish-Bentinck, 3rd Duke of Portland	Independent	Tory	
1794	Frederick Howard, 5th Earl of Carlisle	Whig	Tory	
1801	Thomas Pelham, 2nd Earl of Chichester	Whig	Tory	
1802	Edward Law, 1st Baron Ellenborough	Whig	Tory	
1812	George James Cholmondeley, 4th Earl of Cholmondeley	Whig	Tory	
1830	Ulick de Burgh, 1st Marquess of Clanricarde	Tory	Whig	
1834	Francis Conyngham, 2nd Marquess Conyngham	Tory	Whig	
1834	Charles Gordon-Lennox, 5th Duke of Richmond	Whig	Conservative	Resigned as Postmaster General of the United Kingdom.
1834	Frederick Robinson, 1st Earl of Ripon	Whig	Conservative	Resigned as Lord Privy Seal.
1846	George Hamilton-Gordon, 4th Earl of Aberdeen	Conservative	Peelite	Resigned as Foreign Secretary.
1846	Henry Pelham-Clinton, 5th Duke of Newcastle	Conservative	Peelite	Resigned as Chief Secretary for Ireland.
1846	Edward Eliot, 3rd Earl of St Germans	Conservative	Peelite	Resigned as Postmaster General of the United Kingdom.
1853	Charles Canning, 1st Earl Canning	Conservative	Peelite	Resigned as Commissioner of Woods and Forests.
1855	Charles Somers-Cocks, 3rd Earl Somers	Conservative	Whig	
1884	Lawrence Dundas, 1st Marquess of Zetland	Liberal	Conservative	
1886	Edward Stanley, 15th Earl of Derby	Liberal	Liberal Unionist	
1886	Charles Pelham, 4th Earl of Yarborough	Liberal	Liberal Unionist	
1886	Spencer Cavendish, 8th Duke of Devonshire	Liberal	Liberal Unionist	
1886	Francis Russell, 9th Duke of Bedford	Liberal	Liberal Unionist	
1886	Chichester Parkinson-Fortescue, 1st Baron Carlingford	Liberal	Liberal Unionist	
1886	Richard de Aquila Grosvenor, 1st Baron Stalbridge	Liberal	Liberal Unionist	
1886	Thomas Baring, 1st Earl of Northbrook	Liberal	Liberal Unionist	
1886	Edward Hyde Villiers, 5th Earl of Clarendon	Liberal	Liberal Unionist	
1886	Hugh Grosvenor, 1st Duke of Westminster	Liberal	Liberal Unionist	
1886	Francis Russell, 9th Duke of Bedford	Liberal	Liberal Unionist	
1886	Roundell Palmer, 1st Earl of Selborne	Liberal	Liberal Unionist	
1886	Albert Parker, 3rd Earl of Morley	Liberal	Liberal Unionist	
1886	Richard Dawson, 1st Earl of Dartrey	Liberal	Liberal Unionist	
1886	Thomas Spring Rice, 2nd Baron Monteagle of Brandon	Liberal	Liberal Unionist	
1886	George Campbell, 8th Duke of Argyll	Liberal	Independent	Resigned over disagreements on Irish Home Rule.
1891	All Irish Conservative peers	Irish Conservative	Irish Unionist	Conservatives in Ireland merged into new party.
1895	Henry Petty-Fitzmaurice, 5th Marquess of Lansdowne	Liberal	Liberal Unionist	
1904	Spencer Cavendish, 8th Duke of Devonshire	Liberal Unionist	Conservative	
1904	Ivor Guest, 1st Baron Wimborne	Conservative	Liberal	
1905	Henry Petty-Fitzmaurice, 5th Marquess of Lansdowne	Liberal Unionist	Conservative	
1912	William Palmer, 2nd Earl of Selborne	Liberal Unionist	Conservative	Conservative and Liberal Unionist parties merged.
1920	John Wodehouse, 2nd Earl of Kimberley	Liberal	Labour	
1924	Maurice Towneley-O'Hagan, 3rd Baron O'Hagan	Liberal	Conservative	
1923	Richard Haldane, 1st Viscount Haldane	Liberal	Labour	
1924	Charles Cripps, 1st Baron Parmoor	Conservative	Labour	To serve as Lord President of the Council in the First MacDonald ministry.
1945	Frederick James Marquis, 1st Earl of Woolton	Independent	Conservative	
1947	Charles Kerr, 1st Baron Teviot	National Liberal	Conservative	
1948	Oswald Phipps, 4th Marquess of Normanby	Conservative	Labour	
1950	Oswald Phipps, 4th Marquess of Normanby	Labour	Independent	
1959	David Rees Rees-Williams, 1st Baron Ogmore	Labour	Liberal	
1975	Alan Mais, Baron Mais	Labour	Liberal	
1979	Alfred Robens, Baron Robens of Woldingham	Labour	Conservative	Unhappy with how left wing the Labour Party was becoming.
1979	Alun Jones, Baron Chalfont	Labour	Independent	
1979	Richard Marsh, Baron Marsh	Labour	Independent	
1981	George Brown, Baron George-Brown	Labour	SDP	
1981	Elaine Burton, Baroness Burton of Coventry	Labour	SDP	
1981	Hugh Cudlipp, Baron Cudlipp	Labour	SDP	
1981	John Diamond, Baron Diamond	Labour	SDP	
1981	Jack Donaldson, Baron Donaldson of Kingsbridge	Labour	SDP	
1981	John Harris, Baron Harris of Greenwich	Labour	SDP	
1981	Derek Page, Baron Whaddon	Labour	SDP	
1981	Walter Perry, Baron Perry of Walton	Labour	SDP	
1981	Stephen Taylor, Baron Taylor	Labour	SDP	
1981	Thomas Taylor, Baron Taylor of Gryfe	Labour	SDP	
1981	Henry Walston, Baron Walston	Labour	SDP	
1981	Henry Wilson, Baron Wilson of Langside	Labour	SDP	
1981	Ian Winterbottom, Baron Winterbottom	Labour	SDP	
1982	Andrew Cavendish, 11th Duke of Devonshire	Conservative	SDP	
1982	John Edward Poynder Grigg, 2nd Baron Altrincham	Conservative	SDP	
1982	Wayland Hilton Young, 2nd Baron Kennet	Labour	SDP	
1982	Martin Attlee, 2nd Earl Attlee	Labour	SDP	
1982	Herbert Bowden, Baron Aylestone	Labour	SDP	
1982	Robert Hall, Baron Roberthall	Independent	SDP	
1982	Alan Sainsbury, Baron Sainsbury	Labour	SDP	
1982	Hartley Shawcross, Baron Shawcross	Labour	SDP	
1982	Phyllis Stedman, Baroness Stedman	Labour	SDP	
1982	George Thomson, Baron Thomson of Monifieth	Labour	SDP	
1982	Henry Wilson, Baron Wilson of Langside	Labour	SDP	
1986	Bob Mellish, Baron Mellish	Labour	SDP	
1988	Phyllis Stedman, Baroness Stedman	SDP	SDP	Opposed the SDP's merger with the Liberals.
1988	Robert Skidelsky, Baron Skidelsky	SDP	SDP	Opposed the SDP's merger with the Liberals.
1988	John Diamond, Baron Diamond	SDP	SDP	Opposed the SDP's merger with the Liberals.
1988	Elaine Burton, Baroness Burton of Coventry	SDP	Independent	SDP merged with Liberals.
1990	Phyllis Stedman, Baroness Stedman	SDP	Independent	Continuing SDP dissolved.
1990	John Diamond, Baron Diamond	SDP	Independent	Continuing SDP dissolved.
1990	Robert Skidelsky, Baron Skidelsky	SDP	Independent	Continuing SDP dissolved.
1992	Robert Skidelsky, Baron Skidelsky	Independent	Conservative	Joined Conservatives.
1995	John Diamond, Baron Diamond	Independent	Labour	
1997	David Alton, Baron Alton of Liverpool	Liberal Democrats	Independent	Was unhappy with the pro-choice stance of certain colleagues.
1997	John Attlee, 3rd Earl Attlee	Independent	Conservative	
1997	Vere Harmsworth, 3rd Viscount Rothermere	Conservative	Labour	Over the party's policies.
1998	David Hacking, 3rd Baron Hacking	Conservative	Labour	Over the party's European policies.
1998	Hugh Thomas, Baron Thomas of Swynnerton	Conservative	Liberal Democrats	Over the party's policies.
1998	Cherry Drummond, 16th Baroness Strange	Conservative	Independent	Over reduction in the number of hereditary peers.
1999	Timothy Beaumont, Baron Beaumont of Whitley	Liberal Democrats	Green	Objected to the party's support of free trade.
2000	Barbara Young, Baroness Young of Old Scone	Labour	Independent	After taking up an appointment as Chief Executive of Environment Agency.
2000	Jeffrey Archer, Baron Archer of Weston-super-Mare	Conservative	Independent	Expelled after being jailed for perjury and perverting the course of justice.
2001	Robert Skidelsky, Baron Skidelsky	Conservative	Independent	
2002	David Stoddart, Baron Stoddart of Swindon	Labour	Independent	Expelled for backing a Socialist Alliance candidate.
2004	Edward Haughey, Baron Ballyedmond	UUP	Conservative	
2004	Malcolm Pearson, Baron Pearson of Rannoch	Conservative	Independent	Expelled for backing UKIP.
2004	Leopold Verney, 21st Baron Willoughby de Broke	Conservative	Independent	Expelled for backing UKIP.
2004	David Robert Stevens, Baron Stevens of Ludgate	Conservative	Independent	Expelled for backing UKIP.
2004	Caroline Cox, Baroness Cox	Conservative	Independent	Expelled for backing UKIP.
2005	Christopher Haskins, Baron Haskins	Labour	Independent	Expelled for donating £2,500 to Liberal Democrats.
2005	Mike Watson, Baron Watson of Invergowrie	Labour	Independent	Expelled after being convicted of arson.
2007	Conrad Black, Baron Black of Crossharbour	Conservative	Independent	Expelled after being convicted of fraud.
2007	David Trimble, Baron Trimble	UUP	Conservative	Joined the Conservatives "to have a greater impact on politics in the United Kingdom".
2007	Malcolm Pearson, Baron Pearson of Rannoch	Independent	UKIP	Joined UKIP.
2007	Leopold Verney, 21st Baron Willoughby de Broke	Independent	UKIP	Joined UKIP.
2008	Shreela Flather, Baroness Flather	Conservative	Independent	Resigned.
2009	Nazir Ahmed, Baron Ahmed	Labour	Independent	Expelled after being convicted of dangerous driving.
2009	Thomas Taylor, Baron Taylor of Blackburn	Labour	Independent	Suspended over Cash for Influence.
2009	Peter Truscott, Baron Truscott	Labour	Independent	Suspended over Cash for Influence.
2009	Stanley Kalms, Baron Kalms	Conservative	Independent	Expelled for backing UKIP.
2010	Paul White, Baron Hanningfield	Conservative	Independent	Expelled due to Parliamentary expenses scandal.
2010	John Taylor, Baron Taylor of Warwick	Conservative	Independent	Resigned due to Parliamentary expenses scandal.
2010	Pola Uddin, Baroness Uddin	Labour	Independent	Expelled due to Parliamentary expenses scandal.
2010	Swraj Paul, Baron Paul	Labour	Independent	Expelled due to Parliamentary expenses scandal.
2010	Amir Bhatia, Baron Bhatia	Labour	Independent	Expelled due to Parliamentary expenses scandal.
2011	Anthony Jacobs, Baron Jacobs	Liberal Democrats	Independent	Due to opposition to party policies on taxation.
2011	Lucius Cary, 15th Viscount Falkland	Liberal Democrats	Independent	Due to opposition to direction of the party.
2012	Jenny Tonge, Baroness Tonge	Liberal Democrats	Independent	Quit the party rather than apologise due to strong criticisms of Israel.
2012	Nazir Ahmed, Baron Ahmed	Labour	Independent	Suspended for comments made about America.
2012	Nazir Ahmed, Baron Ahmed	Independent	Labour	Suspension lifted after investigation clears Ahmed.
2012	Ken Maginnis, Baron Maginnis of Drumglass	UUP	Independent	Resigned from the party over his anti-gay remarks.
2012	Mike Watson, Baron Watson of Invergowrie	Independent	Labour	Re-admitted to the Labour Party.
2012	David Robert Stevens, Baron Stevens of Ludgate	Independent	UKIP	Joined UKIP.
2013	Nazir Ahmed, Baron Ahmed	Labour	Independent	Suspended for alleged antisemitism.
2013	Brian Mackenzie, Baron Mackenzie of Framwellgate	Labour	Independent	Suspended after being found to have offered to lobby for a firm in return for cash.
2013	Jack Cunningham, Baron Cunningham of Felling	Labour	Independent	Suspended after being found to have offered to lobby for a firm in return for cash.
2013	John Laird, Baron Laird	UUP	Independent	Suspended after being found to have offered to lobby for a firm in return for cash.
2014	Chris Rennard, Baron Rennard	Liberal Democrats	Independent	Suspended for refusing to apologise over sexual assault claims.
2014	Matthew Oakeshott, Baron Oakeshott of Seagrove Bay	Liberal Democrats	Independent	Due to opposition to direction of the party.
2014	Chris Rennard, Baron Rennard	Independent	Liberal Democrats	Re admitted to the Liberal Democrats.
2015	Paul Strasburger, Baron Strasburger	Liberal Democrats	Independent	Resigned over donor allegations.
2015	Qurban Hussain, Baron Hussain	Liberal Democrats	Independent	Resigned after illegally bringing a child into the UK from Pakistan.
2015	Barbara Young, Baroness Young of Old Scone	Independent	Labour	Rejoined the party.
2015	Alan Sugar, Baron Sugar	Labour	Independent	Resigned from the party over its direction.
2015	John Sewel, Baron Sewel	Labour	Independent	Suspended from party following reports of an orgy featuring prostitutes and cocaine.
2015	Ros Altmann, Baroness Altmann	Labour	Conservative	Expelled after it was discovered she had been a Labour member at the time she was already a Conservative minister.
2015	Andrew Adonis, Baron Adonis	Labour	Independent	Relinquished the Labour whip while heading a commission on major infrastructure projects.
2015	Norman Warner, Baron Warner	Labour	Independent	Resigned in protest at the direction the party was heading under Jeremy Corbyn.
2015	Anthony Grabiner, Baron Grabiner	Labour	Independent	Resigned in protest at the direction the party was heading under Jeremy Corbyn.
2016	Emma Nicholson, Baroness Nicholson of Winterbourne	Liberal Democrats	Conservative	Disagreed with the party's view on the European Union and grammar schools.
2016	Zahida Manzoor, Baroness Manzoor	Liberal Democrats	Conservative	Disagreed with the party's view on the European Union and grammar schools.
2016	Jim O'Neill, Baron O'Neill of Gatley	Conservative	Independent	Resigned over concerns that May was not committed to the 'Northern Powerhouse'.
2016	Parry Mitchell, Baron Mitchell	Labour	Independent	Resigned in protest at the direction the party was heading under Jeremy Corbyn.
2017	Alex Carlile, Baron Carlile of Berriew	Liberal Democrats	Independent	Disagreed with the party's direction.
2018	Anthony Lester, Baron Lester of Herne Hill	Liberal Democrats	Independent	Suspended over allegations of sexual harassment.
2018	Leopold Verney, 21st Baron Willoughby de Broke	UKIP	Independent	Quit the party.
2018	David Robert Stevens, Baron Stevens of Ludgate	UKIP	Independent	Quit the party over Gerard Batten's support and hiring of Tommy Robinson.
2019	David Steel, Baron Steel of Aikwood	Liberal Democrats	Independent	Suspended after he stated that he was aware Cyril Smith had been a child abuser.
2019	David Steel, Baron Steel of Aikwood	Independent	Liberal Democrats	Re-admitted to the party.
2019	Michael Heseltine, Baron Heseltine	Conservative	Independent	Suspended over his support for the Lib Dems during the 2019 EU election.
2019	Andrew Cooper, Baron Cooper of Windrush	Conservative	Independent	Suspended over his support for the Lib Dems during the 2019 EU election.
2019	Michael Cashman, Baron Cashman	Labour	Independent	Resigned over his support for the Lib Dems during the 2019 EU election.
2019	Lewis Moonie, Baron Moonie	Labour	Independent	Suspended from the party over allegations of transphobia.
2019	Chris Holmes, Baron Holmes of Richmond	Conservative	Independent	Suspended due to allegations of sexual assault.
2019	David Triesman, Baron Triesman	Labour	Independent	Resigned over antisemitism within the Labour Party under Jeremy Corbyn.
2019	Leslie Turnberg, Baron Turnberg	Labour	Independent	Resigned over antisemitism within the Labour Party under Jeremy Corbyn.
2019	Ara Darzi, Baron Darzi of Denham	Labour	Independent	Resigned over antisemitism within the Labour Party under Jeremy Corbyn.
2019	Andrew Stone, Baron Stone of Blackheath	Labour	Independent	Suspended from the party over allegations of sexual assault and transphobia.
2019	Malcolm Pearson, Baron Pearson of Rannoch	UKIP	Independent	Quit the party over party infighting.
2020	David Lea, Baron Lea of Crondall	Labour	Independent	Suspended from the party over allegations of stalking women.
2020	David Steel, Baron Steel of Aikwood	Liberal Democrats	Independent	Resigned after a report found he did not act on allegations of child abuse by Cyril Smith.
2020	Parry Mitchell, Baron Mitchell	Independent	Labour	Rejoined because of Keir Starmer's handling of antisemitism within the party.
2020	David Triesman, Baron Triesman	Independent	Labour	Rejoined because of Keir Starmer's handling of antisemitism within the party.
2020	Leslie Turnberg, Baron Turnberg	Independent	Labour	Rejoined because of Keir Starmer's handling of antisemitism within the party.
2020	Chris Holmes, Baron Holmes of Richmond	Independent	Conservative	Re-admitted after being found not guilty of sexual assault.
2020	Meghnad Desai, Baron Desai	Labour	Independent	Resigned over antisemitism within the Labour Party.
2021	Margaret Ritchie, Baroness Ritchie of Downpatrick	Independent	Labour	Joined Labour.
2022	Michelle Mone, Baroness Mone	Conservative	Independent	Whip removed over PPE contracts controversy.
2022	Charles Chetwynd-Talbot, 22nd Earl of Shrewsbury	Conservative	Independent	Whip removed after being found to have lobbied for pay for companies during the COVID-19 pandemic against parliamentary rules.
2022	Mary Goudie, Baroness Goudie	Labour	Independent	Whip removed following committee report finding her to have been guilty of agreeing to provide parliamentary advice in return for payment.
2023	Mary Goudie, Baroness Goudie	Independent	Labour	Readmitted after six month expulsion.
2024	Sayeeda Warsi, Baroness Warsi	Conservative	Independent	Resigned Whip due to Islamophobia
2025	Malcolm Offord, Baron Offord	Conservative	Reform	Joined Reform before resigning from the Lords.

== Members of the European Parliament who have changed party affiliation ==
Date	Member	Before	After	Notes
=== 1979–1984 Parliament ===
January 1984	Michael Gallagher	Labour	SDP	Joined centrist breakaway party.
=== 1994–1999 Parliament ===
June 1997	Ken Coates	Labour	Scottish Socialist	Expelled from the Labour Party after criticising centralisation of power in the leadership.
June 1997	Hugh Kerr	Labour	Scottish Socialist	Expelled from the Labour Party after criticising centralisation of power in the leadership.
January 1998	James Moorhouse	Conservative	Liberal Democrats	Joined the Lib Dems after being de-selected.
March 1999	Brendan Donnelly	Conservative	Pro-Euro Conservative	Created new party.
March 1999	John Stevens	Conservative	Pro-Euro Conservative	Created new party.
May 1999	Christine Oddy	Labour	Independent	Expelled from the Labour Party after row over re-selection.
=== 1999–2004 Parliament ===
February 2000	Michael Holmes	UKIP	Independent	Quit the party after power struggle with UKIP's National Executive Committee.
July 2000	Bill Newton Dunn	Conservative	Liberal Democrats	Joined the Lib Dems.
August 2002	Richard Balfe	Labour	Conservative	Expelled from the Labour Party after disobeying party orders.
=== 2004–2009 Parliament ===
July 2004	Ashley Mote	UKIP	Independent	Expelled from UKIP after being jailed for fraud.
January 2005	Robert Kilroy-Silk	UKIP	Veritas	Created new party, and later became independent.
March 2007	Tom Wise	UKIP	Independent	Expelled from UKIP, pending fraud trial.
March 2007	Jim Allister	DUP	TUV	Created new right-wing breakaway party.
November 2007	Sajjad Karim	Liberal Democrats	Conservative	Joined the Conservatives.
June 2008	Den Dover	Conservative	Independent	Expelled from the Conservatives for violating European Parliament expenses rules.
=== 2009–2014 Parliament ===
September 2009	Edward McMillan-Scott	Conservative	Independent	Expelled from the Conservatives.
January 2010	Nikki Sinclaire	UKIP	Independent	Expelled from UKIP for "extreme views".
March 2010	Edward McMillan-Scott	Independent	Liberal Democrats	Joined the Lib Dems.
May 2011	David Campbell Bannerman	UKIP	Conservative	Re-joined the Conservatives.
March 2012	Roger Helmer	Conservative	UKIP	Joined UKIP.
October 2012	Andrew Brons	BNP	Independent	Quit the party.
February 2013	Marta Andreasen	UKIP	Conservative	Joined the Conservatives.
September 2013	Mike Nattrass	UKIP	Independent	Deselected by UKIP for the 2014 European election. He subsequently resigned from the party calling Farage's leadership "totalitarian".
September 2013	Godfrey Bloom	UKIP	Independent	Whip withdrawn due to inappropriate comments.
=== 2014–2019 Parliament ===
January 2015	Amjad Bashir	UKIP	Conservative	Joined the Conservatives.
March 2015	Janice Atkinson	UKIP	Independent	Suspended and then later expelled from UKIP due to allegations of impropriety.
October 2016	Steven Woolfe	UKIP	Independent	Quit the party.
November 2016	Diane James	UKIP	Independent	Quit the party.
October 2017	Richard Ashworth	Conservative	Independent	Suspended from party and whip withdrawn.
October 2017	Julie Girling	Conservative	Independent	Suspended from party and whip withdrawn.
January 2018	Jonathan Arnott	UKIP	Independent	Quit the party, stating leader Henry Bolton "not the right person for the job".
May 2018	James Carver	UKIP	Independent	Quit the party over leader Gerard Batten's support for Tommy Robinson.
September 2018	William Legge, 10th Earl of Dartmouth	UKIP	Independent	Quit the party, labelling it "homophobic and anti-Islamic".
October 2018	Bill Etheridge	UKIP	Libertarian	Defected to the Libertarian Party.
November 2018	Louise Bours	UKIP	Independent	Quit the party.
November 2018	Patrick O'Flynn	UKIP	SDP	Joined the extant SDP.
December 2018	Nigel Farage	UKIP	Independent	Quit the party.
December 2018	Nathan Gill	UKIP	Independent	Quit the party.
December 2018	David Coburn	UKIP	Independent	Quit the party.
December 2018	Paul Nuttall	UKIP	Independent	Quit the party.
December 2018	Tim Aker	UKIP	Thurrock Ind.	Quit the party.
December 2018	Julia Reid	UKIP	Independent	Quit the party.
December 2018	Jonathan Bullock	UKIP	Independent	Quit the party.
November 2018	Diane James	Independent	Brexit Party	Joined the Brexit Party.
November 2018	David Coburn	Independent	Brexit Party	Joined the Brexit Party.
November 2018	Nigel Farage	Independent	Brexit Party	Joined the Brexit Party.
November 2018	Nathan Gill	Independent	Brexit Party	Joined the Brexit Party.
November 2018	Julia Reid	Independent	Brexit Party	Joined the Brexit Party.
November 2018	Tim Aker	Thurrock Ind.	Brexit Party	Joined the Brexit Party.
November 2018	Jonathan Bullock	Independent	Brexit Party	Joined the Brexit Party.
November 2018	Bill Etheridge	Libertarian	Brexit Party	Joined the Brexit Party.
November 2018	Paul Nuttall	Independent	Brexit Party	Joined the Brexit Party.
April 2019	Jill Seymour	UKIP	Brexit Party	Joined the Brexit Party.
April 2019	Jane Collins	UKIP	Brexit Party	Joined the Brexit Party.
April 2019	Margot Parker	UKIP	Brexit Party	Joined the Brexit Party.
April 2019	Jonathan Arnott	Independent	Brexit Party	Joined the Brexit Party.
April 2019	Julie Girling	Independent	Change UK	Joined new group.
April 2019	Richard Ashworth	Independent	Change UK	Joined new group.
April 2019	Ray Finch	UKIP	Brexit Party	Joined the Brexit Party.
May 2019	Julie Girling	Change UK	Independent	Voiced support for the Liberal Democrats in the 2019 European elections.
=== 2019–2024 Parliament ===
September 2019	Andrew England Kerr	Brexit Party	Independent	Whip withdrawn for "irreconcilable differences regarding a likely conflict of interest".
November 2019	Louis Stedman-Bryce	Brexit Party	Independent	Resigned from the party.
December 2019	Lucy Harris	Brexit Party	Conservative	Joined the Conservative Party.
December 2019	Lance Forman	Brexit Party	Conservative	Joined the Conservative Party.
December 2019	John Longworth	Brexit Party	Conservative	Joined the Conservative Party.
December 2019	Annunziata Rees-Mogg	Brexit Party	Conservative	Joined the Conservative Party.

== London Assembly Members who have changed party affiliation ==
Date	Member	Before	After	Notes
=== 2004–2008 Assembly ===
September 2005	Damian Hockney	UKIP	One London	First joined Veritas, then created new party One London.
September 2005	Peter Hulme-Cross	UKIP	One London	First joined Veritas, then created new party One London.
=== 2008–2012 Assembly ===
August 2010	Richard Barnbrook	BNP	Independent	Expelled from the BNP.
=== 2016–2021 Assembly ===
December 2018	Peter Whittle	UKIP	Independent	Quit the party.
January 2020	David Kurten	UKIP	Independent	Quit the party in order to run as an Independent in the 2020 London mayoral election.
September 2020	David Kurten	Independent	Heritage	Formed own party.
=== 2024–2028 Assembly ===
January 2025	Unmesh Desai	Labour	Independent	Suspended from party.
17 March 2025	Unmesh Desai	Independent	Labour	Whip restored
4 October 2025	Keith Prince	Conservative	Reform	Defected to Reform UK
20 October 2026	Andrew Boff	Conservative	Independent	Resigned from the Conservative Party

== Members of the Senedd who have changed party affiliation ==
Date	Member	Before	After	Notes
=== 1999–2003 Assembly ===
2000	Rod Richards	Conservative	Ind. Conservative	Whip withdrawn after abstaining on a budget vote.
=== 2003–2007 Assembly ===
2005	Peter Law	Labour	Independent	Left party in protest at the use of all-woman shortlists.
=== 2007–2011 Assembly ===
2009	Mohammad Asghar	Plaid Cymru	Conservative	Explained that he was a "Unionist" and against Welsh independence.
2010	Mick Bates	Liberal Democrats	Independent	Suspended after it was discovered that he would be prosecuted for assault.
=== 2016–2021 Assembly/Senedd ===
2016	Nathan Gill	UKIP	Independent	Left UKIP group to sit as an independent.
2016	Dafydd Elis-Thomas	Plaid Cymru	Independent	Left Plaid Cymru party to support the Labour minority government.
2017	Neil McEvoy	Plaid Cymru	Independent	Suspended from party group.
2017	Mark Reckless	UKIP	Conservative	Left UKIP group to sit as an independent within the Conservative Group.
2017	Carl Sargeant	Labour	Independent	Sargeant was suspended from Welsh Labour following allegations about his personal conduct.
2018	Mandy Jones	UKIP	Independent	Left UKIP group to sit as an independent after criticising Neil Hamilton.
2018	Caroline Jones	UKIP	Independent	Left UKIP group to sit as an independent, stating the party had moved "to a more far-right position".
2018	Jenny Rathbone	Labour	Independent	Suspended over remarks about Jewish people.
2019	Jenny Rathbone	Independent	Labour	Re-admitted.
2019	Michelle Brown	UKIP	Independent	Left UKIP group to sit as an independent.
2019	Mark Reckless	Conservative	Independent	Left Conservative Group on 'good terms' to sit as an independent.
2019	Caroline Jones	Independent	Brexit Party	Joined the Brexit Party.
2019	Mandy Jones	Independent	Brexit Party	Joined the Brexit Party.
2019	Mark Reckless	Independent	Brexit Party	Joined the Brexit Party.
2019	David Rowlands	UKIP	Brexit Party	Joined the Brexit Party.
2019	Gareth Bennett	UKIP	Independent	Quit the party.
2020	Nick Ramsay	Conservative	Independent	Arrested on 1 January 2020 and suspended from the Conservative group the following day.
2020	Neil McEvoy	Independent	Welsh National Party	Formed the Welsh National Party.
2020	Gareth Bennett	Independent	Abolish	Joined the Abolish the Welsh Assembly Party.
2020	Nick Ramsay	Independent	Conservative	Re-admitted.
2020	Caroline Jones	Brexit Party	Independent	Left the Brexit Party due to their anti-devolution stance.
2020	Caroline Jones	Independent	Independent	Formed a new group: Independent Alliance for Reform.
2020	Mandy Jones	Brexit Party	Independent	Formed a new group: Independent Alliance for Reform.
2020	David Rowlands	Brexit Party	Independent	Formed a new group: Independent Alliance for Reform.
2020	Mark Reckless	Brexit Party	Abolish	Joined the Abolish the Welsh Assembly Party.
2021	Alun Davies	Labour	Independent	Suspended after allegedly being involved in alcohol drinking on the Senedd estate, that could have broken COVID restrictions.
2021	Alun Davies	Independent	Labour	Re-admitted.
2021	Nick Ramsay	Conservative	Independent	Left the Conservative Group after being unhappy with the party's direction, and wanting to stand as an Independent in the Senedd election, after being deselected by the local group.
=== 2021–2026 Senedd ===
2022	Rhys ab Owen	Plaid Cymru	Independent	Suspended on 8 November 2022 pending an investigation by the Senedd's standards watchdog over an alleged breach of the code of conduct.
2025	Russell George	Conservative	Independent	Suspended on 14 April 2025 after being charged with betting offences by the Gambling Commission.
2025	Laura Anne Jones	Conservative	Reform	Said that she could "no longer justify decisions the party had made".
2026	James Evans	Conservative	Independent	Expelled from party
2026	James Evans	Independent	Reform	Joined Reform UK
=== 2026–2031 Senedd ===
2026	Sarah Cooper-Lesadd	Reform	Plaid Cymru	Quit Reform UK after Resignation of Dan Thomas claiming Reform has "no interest in Wales".

== Members of the Scottish Parliament who have changed party affiliation ==
Date	Member	Before	After	Notes
=== 1999–2003 Parliament ===
2002	Dorothy-Grace Elder	SNP	Independent	Resigned over disagreement over how the party was run.
2003	Margo MacDonald	SNP	Independent	Ranked low on the party list for re-election so stood as an independent and was expelled from party; re-elected as an independent.
=== 2003–2007 Parliament ===
2004	Campbell Martin	SNP	Independent	Expelled from party and stood as an independent.
2005	Mike Watson, Baron Watson of Invergowrie	Labour	Independent	Expelled from the Party after causing a fire and resigned.
2005	Brian Monteith	Conservative	Independent	Had whip withdrawn over misconduct.
2006	Rosemary Byrne	Scottish Socialist	Solidarity	Created new party, Solidarity.
2006	Tommy Sheridan	Scottish Socialist	Solidarity	Created new party, Solidarity.
=== 2007–2011 Parliament ===
March 2011	Hugh O'Donnell	Liberal Democrats	Independent	Quit party over its direction.
=== 2011–2016 Parliament ===
April 2012	Bill Walker	SNP	Independent	Expelled from the SNP for allegedly not declaring the allegations cited in his uncontested divorce proceedings during the MSP vetting process.
October 2012	John Finnie	SNP	Independent	Resigned over the party's decision to support NATO membership for an independent Scotland.
October 2012	Jean Urquhart	SNP	Independent	Resigned over the party's decision to support NATO membership for an independent Scotland.
September 2014	John Wilson	SNP	Independent	Resigned over the party's decision to support NATO membership for an independent Scotland.
October 2014	John Finnie	Independent	Green	Joined the Scottish Green Party, but continued to sit as an Independent MSP.
December 2014	John Wilson	Independent	Green	Joined the Scottish Green Party, but continued to sit as an independent MSP.
September 2015	Jean Urquhart	Independent	RISE	Joined the RISE, but continued to sit as an independent MSP.
=== 2016–2021 Parliament ===
12 May 2016	Ken Macintosh	Labour	Presiding Officer	Elected Presiding Officer and consequently had to renounce his party affiliation.
15 November 2017	Alex Rowley	Labour	Independent	Suspended by Labour due to allegations about his conduct.
16 November 2017	Mark McDonald	SNP	Independent	Suspended by SNP due to allegations about his conduct. Left the SNP on 6 March 2018.
19 December 2017	Alex Rowley	Independent	Labour	Reinstated by Labour.
February 2020	Derek Mackay	SNP	Independent	Suspended by SNP for sending inappropriate messages to a 16-year-old boy.
24 November 2020	Michelle Ballantyne	Conservative	Independent	Left the Conservative Party due to disagreements over policy relating to the COVID-19 pandemic.
18 December 2020	Andy Wightman	Green	Independent	Resigned over policy differences.
12 January 2021	Michelle Ballantyne	Independent	Reform	Became Scots chief of what is now Reform UK after the name change from Brexit Party.
=== 2021–2026 Parliament ===
13 May 2021	Alison Johnstone	Green	Presiding Officer	Elected Presiding Officer.
27 September 2023	Fergus Ewing	SNP	Independent	Suspended for a week over rebellions against the government.
28 October 2023	Ash Regan	SNP	Alba	Defected to the Alba Party.
17 August 2024	John Mason	SNP	Independent	Whip suspended for Gaza comment.
3 April 2025	Jamie Greene	Conservative	Independent	Left the Scottish Conservative Party in protest of Russell Findlay's leadership, claiming the party had adopted a "Reform-esque agenda" and "Trump-esque narrative".
4 April 2025	Jamie Greene	Independent	Liberal Democrats	Joined the Scottish Liberal Democrats.
20 August 2025	Colin Smyth	Labour	Independent	Suspended from the Party after being charged with possessing indecent images.
22 August 2025	Jeremy Balfour	Conservative	Independent	Resigned from Conservatives, saying the party had "fallen into the trap of reactionary politics".
27 August 2025	Graham Simpson	Conservative	Reform	Joined Reform UK.
27 September 2025	Foysol Choudhury	Labour	Independent	Suspended from the Party.
10 October 2025	Ash Regan	Alba	Independent	Resigned from the Alba Party
10 February 2026	Pam Duncan-Glancy	Labour	Independent	Suspended from the Party
=== 2026–2031 Parliament ===
19 October 2026	Amanda Bland	Reform	Independent	Left Party

== Members of the Northern Ireland Assembly who have changed party affiliation ==
Date	Member	Before	After	Notes
=== 1998–2003 Assembly ===
21 September 1998	Fraser Agnew	Ind. Unionist	United Unionist Coalition	Fraser Agnew established a new political party to access facilities provided to Assembly parties.
21 September 1998	Boyd Douglas	Ind. Unionist	United Unionist Coalition	Boyd Douglas established a new political party to access facilities provided to Assembly parties.
21 September 1998	Denis Watson	Ind. Unionist	United Unionist Coalition	Denis Watson established a new political party to access facilities provided to Assembly parties.
4 January 1999	Cedric Wilson	UK Unionist	Ind. Unionist	Cedric Wilson left the UKUP in response to proposals from Robert McCartney to resign their Assembly seats in opposition to Sinn Féin participating in the Executive.
4 January 1999	Norman Boyd	UK Unionist	Ind. Unionist	Norman Boyd left the UKUP in response to proposals from Robert McCartney to resign their Assembly seats in opposition to Sinn Féin participating in the Executive.
4 January 1999	Patrick Roche	UK Unionist	Ind. Unionist	Patrick Roche left the UKUP in response to proposals from Robert McCartney to resign their Assembly seats in opposition to Sinn Féin participating in the Executive.
4 January 1999	Roger Hutchinson	UK Unionist	Ind. Unionist	Roger Hutchinson left the UKUP in response to proposals from Robert McCartney to resign their Assembly seats in opposition to Sinn Féin participating in the Executive.
24 March 1999	Cedric Wilson	Ind. Unionist	NI Unionist	Cedric Wilson established the NIUP having recently left the UKUP.
24 March 1999	Norman Boyd	Ind. Unionist	NI Unionist	Norman Boyd established the NIUP having recently left the UKUP.
24 March 1999	Patrick Roche	Ind. Unionist	NI Unionist	Patrick Roche established the NIUP having recently left the UKUP.
24 March 1999	Roger Hutchinson	Ind. Unionist	NI Unionist	Roger Hutchinson established the NIUP having recently left the UKUP.
1 December 1999	Roger Hutchinson	NI Unionist	Ind. Unionist	Roger Hutchinson expelled from the NIUP for sitting on Assembly committees against party policy.
5 July 2000	Denis Watson	United Unionist Coalition	DUP	Denis Watson joined the DUP.
2 November 2001	Pauline Armitage	UUP	Ind. Unionist	Pauline Armitage suspended from the UUP for voting against the party whip.
9 November 2001	Peter Weir	UUP	Ind. Unionist	Peter Weir expelled from the UUP for refusing to support the re-nomination of David Trimble as First Minister.
1 April 2002	Roger Hutchinson	Ind. Unionist	DUP	Roger Hutchinson joined the DUP.
30 April 2002	Peter Weir	Ind. Unionist	DUP	Peter Weir joined the DUP.
11 November 2002	Gardiner Kane	DUP	Ind. Unionist	Gardiner Kane resigned from the DUP.
1 April 2003	Annie Courtney	SDLP	Ind. Nationalist	Annie Courtney resigned from the SDLP after not being re-selected by the party as a candidate for the 2003 Assembly election.
12 June 2003	Pauline Armitage	Ind. Unionist	UK Unionist	Pauline Armitage resigned her membership of UUP and joined the UKUP.
18 October 2003	Roger Hutchinson	DUP	Ind. Unionist	Roger Hutchinson resigned from the DUP to contest the 2003 Assembly election as an independent unionist.
=== 2003–2007 Assembly ===
18 December 2003	Jeffrey Donaldson	UUP	Ind. Unionist	Jeffrey Donaldson resigned from the UUP.
18 December 2003	Norah Beare	UUP	Ind. Unionist	Norah Beare resigned from the UUP.
18 December 2003	Arlene Foster	UUP	Ind. Unionist	Arlene Foster resigned from the UUP.
5 January 2004	Jeffrey Donaldson	Ind. Unionist	DUP	Jeffrey Donaldson joined the DUP.
5 January 2004	Norah Beare	Ind. Unionist	DUP	Norah Beare joined the DUP.
5 January 2004	Arlene Foster	Ind. Unionist	DUP	Arlene Foster joined the DUP.
4 July 2005	Paul Berry	DUP	Ind. Unionist	Paul Berry was suspended by the DUP following an internal disciplinary panel meeting and media coverage of his private life. He resigned from the party outright following legal challenges on 10 February 2006.
23 November 2005	Francie Molloy	Sinn Féin	Ind. Nationalist	Francie Molloy was suspended by Sinn Féin on 23 November 2005 following disagreements about reforms of local government. Molloy was subsequently readmitted to the party.
10 April 2006	Eileen Bell	Alliance	Speaker	Eileen Bell was appointed Speaker of the Assembly on 10 April 2006 for the first session on 15 May.
15 January 2007	Geraldine Dougan	Sinn Féin	Ind. Nationalist	Geraldine Dougan resigned from Sinn Féin.
2 February 2007	Davy Hyland	Sinn Féin	Ind. Nationalist	Davy Hyland resigned from Sinn Féin.
=== 2007–2011 Assembly ===
8 May 2007	William Hay	DUP	Speaker	William Hay elected Speaker of the Assembly at its first sitting.
29 November 2007	Gerry McHugh	Sinn Féin	Ind. Nationalist	Gerry McHugh resigned from Sinn Féin to become an independent nationalist. on 30 November 2009 he announced that he had joined Fianna Fáil. On 3 December 2009, it was reported that even though he was now a member of Fianna Fáil, he would remain an independent member of the Assembly.
31 March 2010	Alan McFarland	UUP	Ind. Unionist	Alan McFarland resigned from the UUP to become an independent unionist.
3 June 2010	Dawn Purvis	PUP	Ind. Unionist	Dawn Purvis resigned from the PUP to become an independent unionist.
3 January 2011	David McClarty	UUP	Ind. Unionist	David McClarty resigned from the UUP after being deselected for the 2011 election.
=== 2011–2016 Assembly ===
12 May 2011	William Hay	DUP	Speaker	William Hay elected Speaker of the Assembly at its first sitting.
27 January 2012	David McNarry	UUP	Ind. Unionist	David McNarry suspended from the UUP for nine months after an investigation by the party.
4 October 2012	David McNarry	Ind. Unionist	UKIP	David McNarry joined UKIP becoming the party's first Northern Ireland MLA.
14 February 2013	John McCallister	UUP	Ind. Unionist	John McCallister resigned from the UUP after it formed an electoral pact with the DUP.
15 February 2013	Basil McCrea	UUP	Ind. Unionist	Basil McCrea resigned from the UUP after it formed an electoral pact with the DUP.
6 June 2013	John McCallister	Ind. Unionist	NI21	John McCallister along with McCrea established a new political party.
6 June 2013	Basil McCrea	Ind. Unionist	NI21	Basil McCrea along with McCallister established a new political party.
3 July 2014	John McCallister	NI21	Ind. Unionist	John McCallister resigns from NI21 over differences with the party leadership regarding an investigation into sexual wrongdoing by party leader, Basil McCrea.
12 January 2015	Mitchel McLaughlin	Sinn Féin	Speaker	Mitchel McLaughlin elected Speaker of the Assembly following the retirement of William Hay.
=== 2016–2017 Assembly ===
12 May 2016	Robin Newton	DUP	Speaker	Robin Newton elected Speaker of the Assembly at its first sitting.
18 December 2016	Jonathan Bell	DUP	Ind. Unionist	Jonathan Bell suspended from the DUP.
=== 2017–2022 Assembly ===
9 May 2018	Jim Wells	DUP	Ind. Unionist	DUP whip withdrawn from Jim Wells following criticisms of the party leadership.
11 January 2020	Alex Maskey	Sinn Féin	Speaker	Alex Maskey elected Speaker of the Assembly at its first sitting.
2 March 2020	Trevor Lunn	Alliance	Independent	Trevor Lunn resigned from Alliance due to "internal difficulties".
1 July 2021	Alex Easton	DUP	Ind. Unionist	Alex Easton resigned from the DUP following changes in the party leadership.
=== 2022–present Assembly ===
3 February 2024	Edwin Poots	DUP	Speaker	Edwin Poots elected Speaker of the Assembly at its first sitting.
3 February 2024	Justin McNulty	SDLP	Ind. Nationalist	Whip suspended after leaving Assembly session early to manage Laois GAA at a gaelic match.
20 August 2024	Justin McNulty	Ind. Nationalist	SDLP	Whip restored.
31 May 2026	Doug Beattie	UUP	Ind. Unionist	Resigned from the Ulster Unionist party

== Police and crime commissioners (PCCs) who have changed party affiliation ==
Date	Member	County	Before	After	Notes
=== 2012–2016 Commissioners ===
2014	Olly Martins	Bedfordshire	Labour	Independent	Suspended from the Labour Party and investigated by the Independent Police Complaints Commission after he disclosed confidential information about the death of a man in police custody.
=== 2016–2021 Commissioners ===
April 2019	Jane Kennedy	Merseyside	Labour	Independent	Resigned from the Labour Party alleging anti-semitism.
=== 2024–Present Commissioners ===
August 2025	Rupert Matthews	Leicestershire	Conservative	Reform	Defected from the Conservatives to Reform UK saying the "dark heart of wokeness" needed to be cut out of the criminal justice system.
November 2025	Sarah Taylor	Norfolk	Labour	Independent	Resigned from the Labour party
January 2026	Alison Hernandez	Devon	Conservative	Independent	Resigned from the Conservative party
January 2026	Marc Jones	Lincolnshire	Conservative	Independent	Resigned from the Conservative party

== See also ==
- List of Conservative Party defections to Reform UK

== Bibliography ==
- David Butler and Gareth Butler, Twentieth Century British Political Facts (Palgrave Macmillan, 2005)
