= Weisi Lin =

Researcher

Weisi Lin is a President's Chair Professor in Computer Science, at the College of Computing and Data Science (CCDS) of Nanyang Technological University (NTU), Singapore. He was named Fellow of the Institute of Electrical and Electronics Engineers (IEEE) in 2016 "for contributions to perceptual modeling and processing of visual signals." He is also a Fellow of the Institution of Engineering and Technology. He has been a Highly Cited Researcher since 2019 (awarded by Clarivate Analytics), and a Distinguished Lecturer for both IEEE Circuits and Systems Society (2016–2017) and Asia-Pacific Signal and Information Processing Association (APSIPA, 2012–2013). He has been elected for the COE Research Award 2023, NTU.
