= Goodey =

Goodey is a surname. Notable people with the surname include:

- Alfred E. Goodey (1878–1945), British collector of paintings, prints, and photographs
- Erica Baneth-Goodey (1928– ), Australian sculptor, born in Hungary, later in US
- Fritha Goodey (1972–2004), British stage, radio, and film actress

== See also ==
- Goody (disambiguation)
- Goudie
