= Rebecca Cheung =

Scottish electronics engineer

Rebecca Cheung is a Scottish electronics engineer whose research interests include nanoelectronics, micro-electromechanical systems, and biomimetics based on materials including silicon carbide and graphene. She is a professor in the University of Edinburgh School of Engineering, affiliated with its program in electronics and electrical engineering and its research institite in integrated micro and nano systems.

== Education and career ==
Cheung is the daughter of an engineer. She was educated at the University of Glasgow where, after receiving first class honours in electronics and electrical engineering, she completed a Ph.D. in 1990.

After postdoctoral research on semiconductor technology and mesoscopic physics at the University of Glasgow, ETH Zurich in Switzerland, Delft University of Technology in the Netherlands, and University of Canterbury in New Zealand, she returned to Scotland to take a position at the University of Edinburgh in 2000. Initially a lecturer, she was later promoted to reader, and then in 2007 given a personal chair as a professor. At Edinburgh, she has headed the Institute for Integrated Micro and Nano Systems in the Scottish Microelectronics Centre.

== Recognition ==
Cheung was elected as a Fellow of the Royal Society of Edinburgh (FRSE) in 2012. She is also a Fellow of the Institution of Engineering and Technology. She was the 2024 recipient of the Women in Nanofabrication Award at the 3-Beams Conference for Nanofabrication. The Women's Engineering Society named her as one of the winners of their Top 50 Women in Engineering 2026 Awards.
