= Goudy =

Goudy is a surname. Notable people with the surname include:

- Frank B. Goudy (1882–1944), associate justice of the Colorado Supreme Court
- Frederic Goudy (1865–1947), American type designer
  - Goudy Old Style, a typeface created by Frederic Goudy
  - Goudy Sans, a typeface created by Frederic Goudy
- Todd Goudy, Canadian provincial politician
- William C. Goudy (1824–1893), American politician
- Yann Goudy (born 1975), French racing driver

== See also ==
- Goudey, an American defunct chewing gum and baseball card company
- Goudie, a surname
