= Hip Records =

Record label formed around 1967 in America

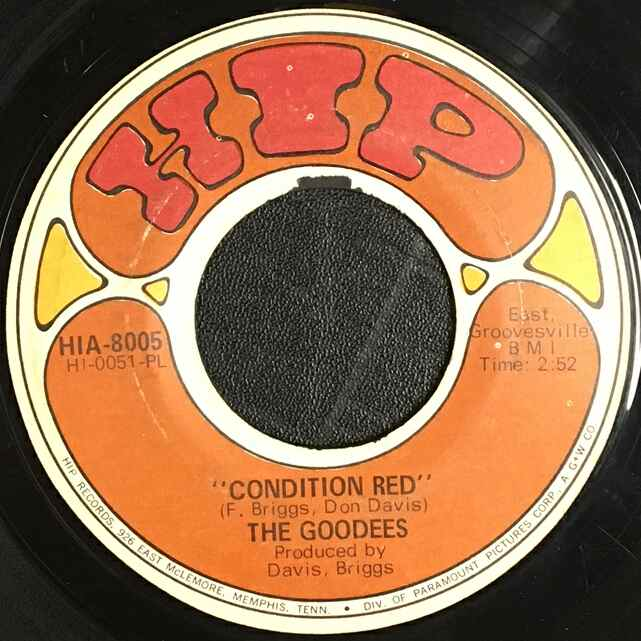
Hip 45 rpm label, by The Goodees singing "Condition Red"

Hip Records was a daughter label of Stax Records. It was formed around 1967 for the purpose of recording and releasing material by Memphis and regional rock bands and groups. The Stax label had always recorded a small amount of non-soul material, and a few white rock bands like The Barracudas, The Cobras and the Memphis Nomads had releases on the Stax label itself. But after 1967, Stax began to set up new labels for different genres, Enterprise for jazz and Hip for rock and roll. Jim Stewart imported singer Sharon Tandy from England to launch the label. Initially a singles label, Hip began to release albums after Stax's acquisition by Gulf & Western/Paramount in 1968. Albums were released by Paris Pilot, The Goodees, The Southwest F.O.B. and The Knowbody Else (Black Oak Arkansas). In 1969, Don Nix was named head of the Enterprise label, and Hip was discontinued. Stax began placing most of its rock, country and jazz on Enterprise going forward.

== See also ==
- List of record labels
