= Goudie =

Goudie is a surname. Notable people with the surname include:

- Alexander Goudie, Scottish painter
- Andrew Goudie, geographer
- Big Boy Goudie
- Chuck Goudie (born 1956), American television journalist
- Elizabeth Goudie
- Gordon Goudie
- James B. Goudie Jr.
- John Goudie (1857–1921), Scottish international footballer
- Johnny Goudie (born 1968), Cuban-American singer, songwriter, musician, record producer and actor
- Joseph Goudie (born 1939), Canadian
- Kathy Goudie
- Lachlan Goudie (born 1976), Scottish artist and television broadcaster.
- Mark Goudie (born 1991), Scottish electrical engineer
- Mary Goudie, Baroness Goudie
- Rex Goudie, Canadian singer, songwriter and runner-up of Canadian Idol 3
- Sandra Goudie

== Other ==
- Goudie (band)

== See also ==
- Goudy (disambiguation)
