= Mark Goudie =

Scottish electrical engineer

Mark Goudie MEng, CEng, FIET, FIES
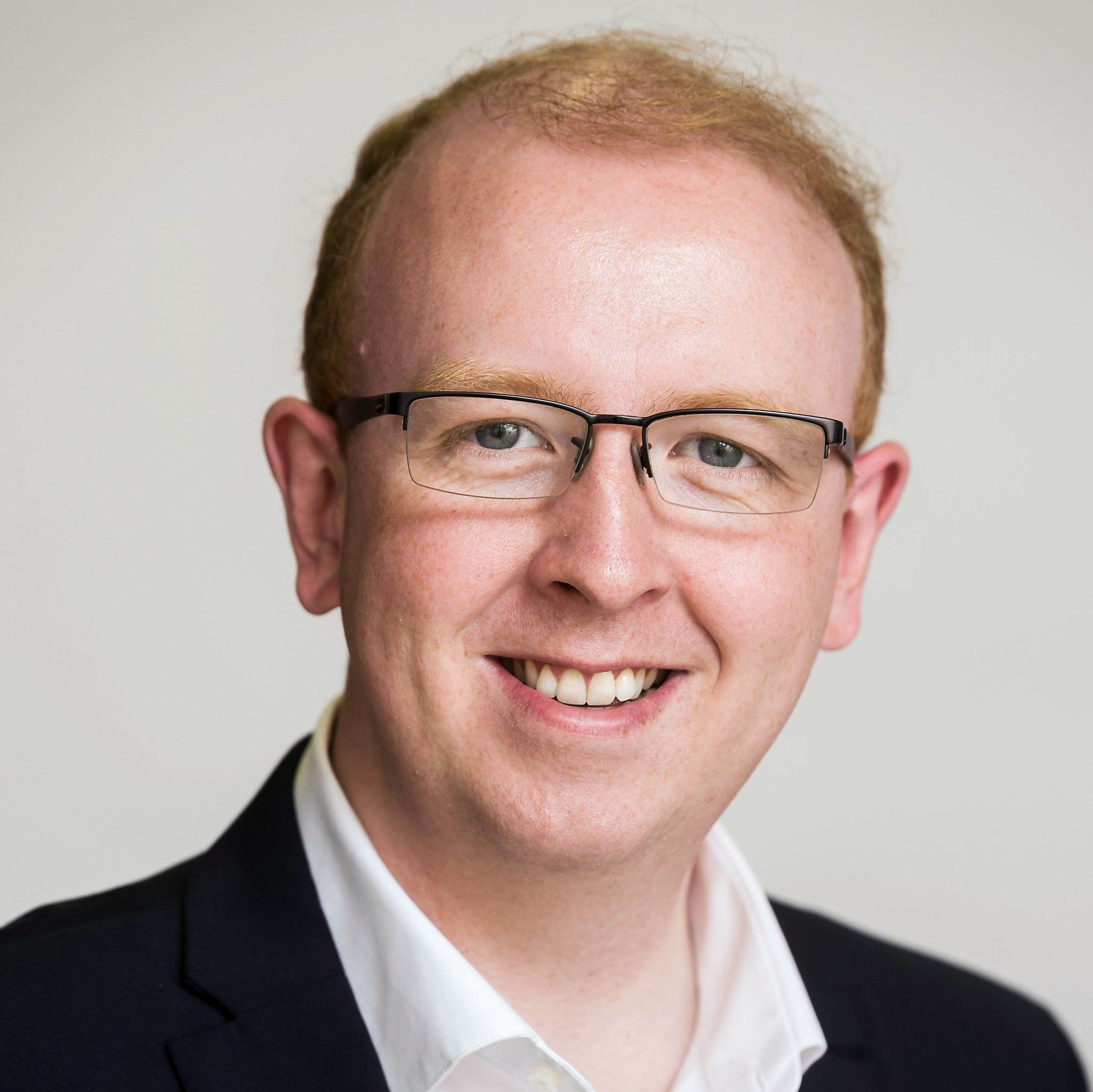
- Born: 1991 (age 34–35); Glasgow, United Kingdom
- Education: University of Strathclyde
- Board member of: Glasgow Science Centre
- Engineering career
- Discipline: Electrical engineering
- Institutions: Institution of Engineering and Technology; Glasgow Science Centre
- Projects: Wind Energy Reservoir Storage (WERS)
- Awards: Fellow of the Institution of Engineering and Technology (2020); Chartered engineer (2020)

Mark Goudie (born 1991) is a Scottish electrical engineer based in Glasgow. He worked as an engineer for Atkins and currently works as the Distribution System Operation Manager for SP Energy Networks, part of ScottishPower. He was elected as one of the youngest ever Fellows of the Institution of Engineering and Technology.

== Early life and education ==
Mark grew up in East Kilbride and studied an MEng in Electrical & Mechanical Engineering at the University of Strathclyde. During his time at university he was a sponsored student with Atkins through the IET Power Academy programme and completed a number of summer placements across the UK.

== Career ==
Mark joined the Atkins graduate scheme in 2015. In 2015, Mark was also recognised for designing the Wind Energy Reservoir Storage (WERS) system that would seek to repurpose aging oil & gas infrastructure. In 2020, he became a Chartered Engineer and Fellow with the Institution of Engineering and Technology. He subsequently became the Distribution System Operation Manager for SP Energy Networks.

== Awards ==
- 2015: Telegraph UK STEM Awards - Energy Category Winner 2015
- 2017: IET Paul Fletcher Award
- 2018: Finalist – Scottish Renewables Young Professionals Green Energy Awards
- 2019: Young Legend - Energy Sector
- 2020: Elected one of the youngest Fellows of the Institution of Engineering and Technology
