= Goody (name) =

Goody is both a surname and an honorific, short for goodwife, analogous to modern-day “Mrs,” as well as a nickname. Notable people with the name include:

Surname:

- Gordon Goody (1930–2016), British criminal, involved in the Great Train Robbery
- Jack Goody (1919–2015), British social anthropologist
- Jade Goody (1981–2009), British reality television star
- Joan E. Goody (1935–2009), American architect
- Laila Goody (born 1971), Norwegian actress
- Lancelot John Goody (1908–1992), Roman Catholic bishop then archbishop of Perth
- Nick Goody (born 1991), American baseball player
- Richard M. Goody (1921–2023), British-American atmospheric physicist and professor of planetary physics
- Roger S. Goody (born 1944), English biochemist

Honorific:

- Goody Cole or Eunice Cole, only woman convicted of witchcraft in New Hampshire
- Goody Osborne or Sarah Osborne, woman accused of witchcraft in the Salem witch trials of 1692
- Goody Two-Shoes or Margery Meanwell, the heroine of the 1765 first children's novel ever written in English and now used a descriptor for an excessively virtuous person or do-gooder

Nickname:

- Goody Petronelli (1923–2012), American boxing trainer and co-manager
- Goody Rosen (1912–1994), Canadian Major League Baseball All Star outfielder
