= The Goodees =

American pop music girl group

The Goodees (Kay Evans, Sandra Jackson and Judy Williams) were an American pop music girl group who enjoyed brief popularity in the late 1960s. Formed in Memphis, Tennessee, the group is best known for the minor hit "Condition Red", a teen melodrama that bore a striking resemblance to the Shangri-Las hit "Leader of the Pack".

The three girls became friends while attending Memphis' Messick High School. Interested in music, they started singing at school assemblies and local events. Their “break” came in 1967 when they won a local talent contest. The winning prize included an audition with Stax Records. Stax signed the trio to its newly formed HIP subsidiary.

Goodee Sandra Jackson more recently worked at SoulsVille USA, an on-line museum that chronicles the history of Memphis rhythm and blues.

The band's song, "Condition Red", was their only hit, peaking at #46 on the Billboard charts. "Condition Red" can be found on girl-group compilations such as Rhino's One Kiss Can Lead to Another and the first volume of the Where the Girls Are CD series. Their song "Jilted" can be found on volume six of the Where the Girls Are series.

== Discography ==
In December 2010, Ace Records UK issued a CD compilation, Condition Red! The Complete Goodees. The album contains the entire Candy Coated Goodees LP, four non-LP singles and B-sides, and seven never-before released tracks.

Compilation Track listing

1. Condition Red
2. Sad Song For Harry
3. A Little Bit Of You
4. Double Shot
5. Worst that Could Happen
6. Girl Crazy
7. Jilted
8. Didn't Know Love Was So Good
9. My Boyfriend's Back
10. Promises
11. He's A Rebel
12. For A Little While (non-LP single)
13. Would You, Could You (non-LP b-side)
14. Love Is Here (non-LP biside)
15. Goodies (non-LP b-side)
16. Angry Eyes (previously unreleased)
17. Love Me Love (previously unreleased)
18. Show Me How (previously unreleased)
19. Last Of The Good Guys (previously unreleased)
20. Didn't Know Love Was So Good (Alternate Version, previously unreleased)
21. Have You Ever Hurt The One You Love (previously unreleased)
22. Love Pill (previously unreleased)
