= Phyllis Stedman, Baroness Stedman =

British politician (b. 1916, d. 1996)

Phyllis Stedman, Baroness Stedman, OBE (née Adams; 14 July 1916 – 8 June 1996) was a British politician who briefly served as a minister.

Born in Peterborough, Stedman attended Peterborough County Grammar School, then worked as a librarian in her home town, and served in the National Fire Service in Derbyshire during World War II. After marrying Harry Stedman in 1941, she helped run his family horticultural business.

In 1946, Stedman was elected to the Soke of Peterborough County Council, representing the Labour Party, serving on it and its successors until 1976. She was the Prospective Parliamentary Candidate for Hampstead before the 1951 general election, but withdrew due to illness. She was appointed an Officer of the Order of the British Empire (OBE) in the 1965 New Year Honours. At the 1966 general election, Stedman was the election agent for Michael Ward. When it became apparent that the result was very close, Stedman requested repeated recounts. After the seventh recount - a record which stands to this day - Ward was defeated by the incumbent, Harmar Nicholls, by three votes.

In 1972, Stedman was appointed to the Peterborough New Town Development Corporation. On 25 June 1974, she was created a life peer as Baroness Stedman, of Longthorpe in the City of Peterborough, to bolster the Labour Party in the House of Lords, and was appointed as a whip. In January 1979, she was appointed Parliamentary Under-Secretary of State for Sport and Water Resources. When the Labour Party lost the 1979 general election, she was moved to become their spokesperson on the environment.

Stedman defected to the Social Democratic Party (SDP) on its formation in 1981. She became the party's chief whip in the Lords in 1986. Most of the SDP peers opposed the party's merger with the Liberal Party in 1988. She led them into the continuing Social Democratic Party and served as its leader in the Lords. When that party dissolved in 1990, she became non-affiliated.

Party political offices
Preceded by The Lord Diamond	Leader of the Social Democratic Party in the House of Lords; 1988–1990	Succeeded by Position abolished
