= Mary Goudie, Baroness Goudie =

British politician, life peer

The Right Honourable The Baroness Goudie
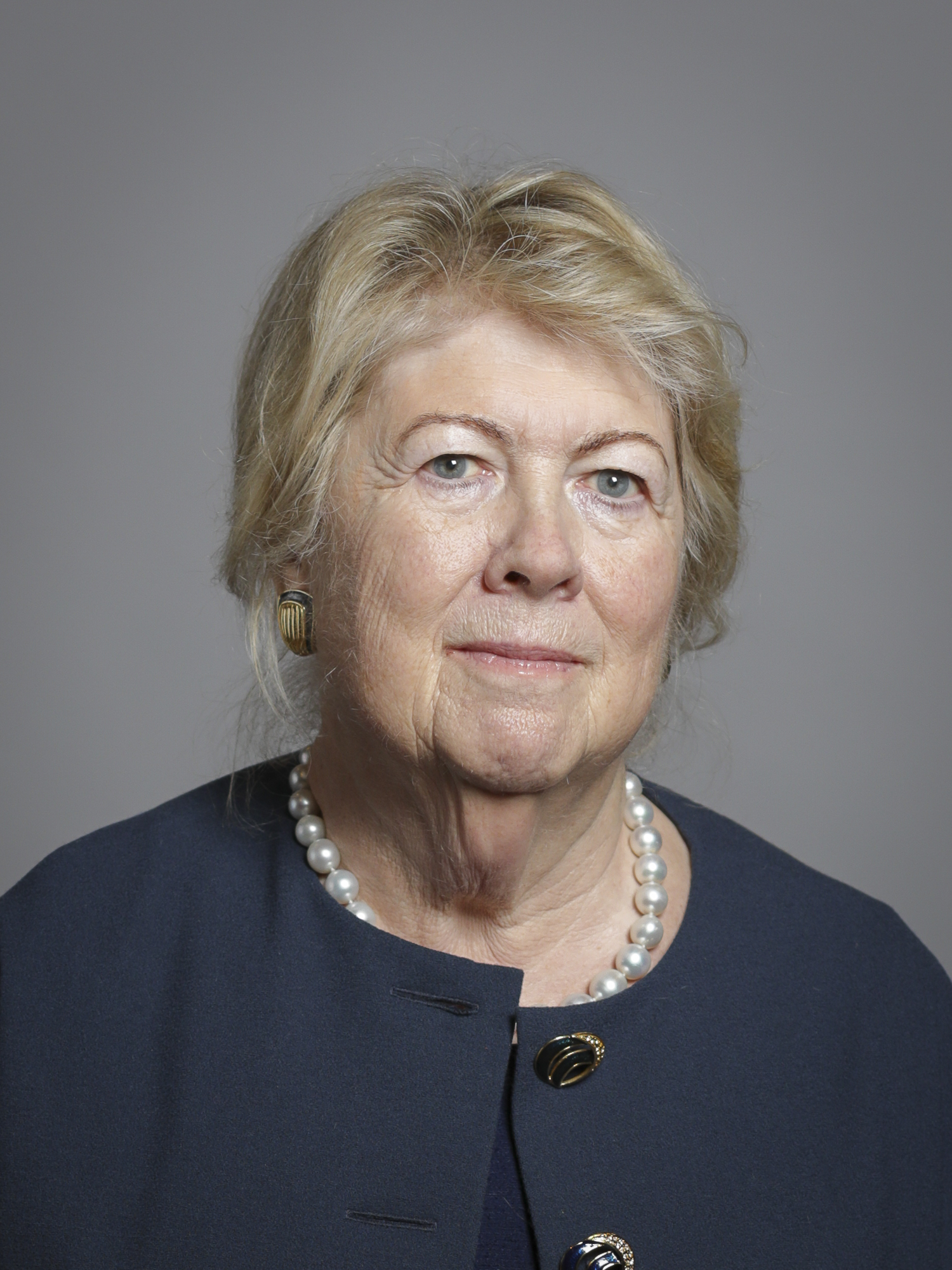

Member of the House of Lords
- Lord Temporal
- Life peerage 21 July 1998

Personal details
- Born: Mary Teresa Brick; 2 September 1946 (age 80)
- Party: Labour
- Other political affiliations: Non-affiliated (during 2022–23 suspension)
- Spouse: James Goudie
- Children: 2 sons

Mary Teresa Goudie, Baroness Goudie (née Brick; born 2 September 1946) is a British politician and life peer, currently sitting for the Labour Party. In 1998, she was made a life peer as Baroness Goudie, of Roundwood in the London Borough of Brent. She is on the board of Vital Voices and is involved in promoting gender equity with both the G8 and G20.

== Early life ==
Mary Teresa Brick was born to Martin and Hannah Brick, Irish emigrants to London. She grew up in London and was educated at Our Lady of the Visitation, Greenford, and Our Lady of St Anselm School, Hayes.

== Career ==
In 1971, Goudie became the youngest woman elected to the Brent London Borough Council. During her time on the borough council she worked to advance the Campaign for a Housing Aid Centre and a Law Centre and she helped found a housing association for the borough. She later became a freelance public affairs consultant.

Goudie was campaign manager to Lord Hattersley who became Deputy Leader of the Labour Party. In 1998, Goudie was appointed a life peer in the House of Lords. She was the European director of public affairs for the World Wide Fund for Nature from 1990 to 1995.

== House of Lords ==
Goudie is a senior member of the House of Lords. She has been a member of the British Irish Inter-Parliamentary Committee and was Vice Chair of the Tax Law Rewrite Committee. She also serves on the All-Party Identity Fraud Committee and since 2010 she has been a member of the Committee of Selection. She is also co-chair of number of All Party Groups. Previously, she was a member of the Communications Committee, the Procedures Committee and the European Committee on Law and the Constitution. She works in the House of Lords to promote the issues of women and children. In the last Parliament she was active in pushing through one of the government's major reform: The Equality Bill. She is vice-chair of the All-Party Parliamentary Equality Group.

== Global activism ==
Goudie is Chair of the Women Leaders’ Council to Fight Human Trafficking at UN Gift. She has championed the ratification of the United Nations' Treaty on Human Trafficking, as well as the Treaty of the Council of Europe on Human Trafficking. Additionally, she is involved with the G8 and G20 to promote the role of women and children in the global economy.

Goudie is a member of the Board of Directors of Vital Voices Global Partnership. In this role she has been involved in training community and business leaders and parliamentarians on social and political issues around the world. She is also a member of La Pietra Coalition, an organisation dedicated to creating "equality in law; equality in business; equality in learning; equality in jobs" by 2020. In 2011, the Coalition promoted its goal of "empowering women is smart economics" to the G20 and have the member states put it on their agenda.

In recognition of her work, Goudie was awarded the 2010 Global Power Award by the Center for Women Policy Studies and in 2011, she received The Womensphere Global Leadership Award.

Goudie is Chair of the Women Leaders' Council to Fight Human Trafficking at the United Nations. In December 2010, attended and presented at the United Nations Global Initiative to Fight Human Trafficking — UN GIFT Conference organized by the End Human Trafficking Now initiative, dedicated to enforcing the UN protocol.

In October 2011, Goudie was a speaker for the Fortune Most Powerful Women's Conference where she addressed "Shaking up the Boardroom: Will Quotas Work". In 2011, Goudie gave presentations at the WomenSphere Pan European Summit in Oxford, UK; and the WomenSphere Global Summit in New York City. She is also involved in The Protection Project at Johns Hopkins University's School of Advanced International Studies. She contributed to the conference on 'Incorporating Human Trafficking in Academic Institutions: The European Experience' that took place at the University of Amsterdam on 25–26 November 2011. In March 2012, she was appointed by Vital Voices Global Partnership and Bank of America as an ambassador for The Global Ambassadors Program. The initiative focuses on investing in emerging women leaders, with an aim of strengthening communities and improving economic growth.

In March 2012, she was appointed to the Global Advisory Board of WEConnect International, a corporate led non-profit, which facilitates inclusive and sustainable economic growth by empowering and connecting women business owners globally. In April 2012 she was appointed a trustee of the El-Hibri Charitable Foundation, whose aims are to foster interfaith dialogue and to find common ground and solutions to global challenges affecting mankind.

In October 2012, Goudie was awarded the TIAW – The International Alliance for Women – World of Difference 100 Award in recognition of her outstanding contribution in making a difference to the economic empowerment of women. TIA W 2012 Awards, tiaw.org; accessed 2 September 2015. In September 2012, Goudie was a speaker at the SAIS.

In Spring 2013, she was elected onto the Board of Directors of EuropEFE, the European Mission of the Education for Employment Foundation based in Spain. In January 2013, she participated in The Emerging Markets Symposium on Gender Inequality. In July 2013, she spoke at The Women in Public Service Project, Institute 2013: Peacebuilding and Development, at Bryn Mawr College.

Goudie is an advisor to the Georgetown Institute for Women, Peace and Security, which examines and highlights the roles and experiences of women in peace and security worldwide through cutting-edge research, timely global convenings, and strategic partnerships.

She is a founding member of the 30% Club and serves on the steering committee, an organisation promoting the inclusion of more women on UK corporate boards.

Goudie is a blogger for The Huffington Post. In July 2013, she wrote "Slavery is a $32bn industry so why aren't we following the money trail?" for The Guardian.

In 2011, Goudie contributed to the book What Next for Labour? Ideas for a New Generation. Her chapter, titled "Can We End Poverty Globally? Asking the Hard Questions", outlines how women are central to aid reform, considering where to invest aid, selecting the right partners and defining programmatic goals.

== Parliamentary rules controversies ==
=== Expenses 2009 ===
On 25 October 2009 Scotland on Sunday suggested that while the Goudies lived in London, she listed her main residence as a flat in Glasgow when claiming House of Lords expenses. This had resulted in her claiming £230,000 of subsistence allowances intended as payments for those outside the capital, who need help to meet the cost of accommodation in London.

After an investigation ending in December 2010, the Clerk of the Parliaments said that he had doubts about the designation of the Glasgow flat as a main residence, when Goudie had a residence in Belgravia. However, no further action was to be taken; she had apologised in writing and repaid £5,130.50 relating to a period when she was sick and unable to travel. In total, Goudie had claimed about £168,000 in overnight expenses and £82,000 for travel to and from the Glasgow property over a nine-year period. Goudie sold the Glasgow flat in 2010.

=== Code of conduct 2022 ===
On 16 December 2022 the House of Lords Conduct Committee recommended that she be suspended from the House of Lords for six months after it was found that she breached the Code of Conduct by agreeing to provide parliamentary advice in return for payment and also for breaching the rules on the use of the House's facilities. Goudie was removed from the Labour Party whip becoming non-affiliated. Her suspension from the Lords began on 11 January 2023. Goudie returned to both Parliament and the Labour whip in July 2023.

== Personal life ==
Goudie is married to James, a barrister with whom she has two sons. They live in a home in London and a holiday home in Cape Cod, Massachusetts. Goudie is a Roman Catholic.
