= Fellow of the Institution of Engineering and Technology =

Fellow of the Institution of Engineering and Technology (FIET)
- Location: London
- Country: United Kingdom
- Website: theiet.org/membership/types/fiet/

Fellow of the UK Institution of Engineering and Technology (FIET) is the highest grade of Institution of Engineering and Technology membership, awarded to those who have sustained high levels of achievement, for several years.

Fellows must fulfil at least two of the nine following criteria:

- Leadership
- Responsibility
- Insight and Experience
- Creativity
- Innovation
- Enterprise
- Service
- Reputation
- Influence and Contribution

Applicants must document on their application that their careers and achievements fulfill the above-mentioned criteria. Applications must be supported by a minimum of two other existing fellows. Also, Fellows of other international learned society as well as chartered engineer status are preferred prior to the application for fellow grade in IET. Applicants include senior engineers, researchers, and technology leaders from industry and accomplished professors from universities.

Prior to the name change of IET, Fellows had the post-nominal letters of FIEE. Existing fellows of IEE automatically became FIET when the engineering institution changed its name in 2006.

== Fellowship ==
Fellows are entitled to use the post-nominal letters FIET. As of 2016 examples of fellows include Muffy Calder, Wendy Hall, Andy Hopper, Lajos Hanzo, and Martin Sweeting. See the Category:Fellows of the Institution of Engineering and Technology for more examples.

== Youngest Fellows ==
The average age of a Fellow of the IET is typically over 45 years old, however a small number of engineers have managed to achieve Fellowship at a significantly younger age.

List of Youngest Ever Fellows of the IET
Name	Age at Election	Date Elected	Notes
Matthew Cole	31 years old	October 2017	
Anirban Sengupta	32 years old	Feb 2019	
Mark Goudie	29 years old	January 2021	
Junade Ali	27 years old	June 2023	
Prasanth Kamma	31 years old	February 2025	
Mrinal Ahlawat	30 years old	July 2025	
