= Change UK election results =

UK political party election results

The Independent Group for Change logo.

This article lists the election results of Change UK in UK parliamentary elections and in elections to the European Parliament.

== 2019 European elections ==
Change UK stood in the 2019 European Parliament elections in every regional constituency except Northern Ireland as a member of the EPP but failed to win a single seat. Candidates included high-profile public figures and celebrities like Robin Bextor, the father of singer Sophie Ellis-Bextor, incumbent Conservative MEP Richard Ashworth, writer Rachel Johnson (sister of then Conservative MPs Jo and Boris Johnson); former BBC journalist Gavin Esler; former Conservative MPs Stephen Dorrell and Neil Carmichael; former Labour MEP Carole Tongue; former Labour MPs Roger Casale and Jon Owen Jones; former Liberal Democrat MEP Diana Wallis; and the former deputy Prime Minister of Poland, Jacek Rostowski.

2019 European Parliament election in the United Kingdom: Great Britain
Year	Leader	Number of votes	Share of votes	Seats	Change	Position
2019	Heidi Allen	571,846	3.3%	0 / 73	New	N/A

=== By constituency ===
Constituency	Votes	%	Position
East Midlands	41,117	3.47	7th
East of England	58,274	3.65	6th
London	117,635	5.25	6th
North East England	24,968	4.00	7th
North West England	47,237	2.72	7th
South East England	105,832	4.17	6th
South West England	46,612	2.80	7th
West Midlands	45,673	3.39	7th
Yorkshire and the Humber	30,162	2.30	8th
Scotland	30,004	1.9	7th
Wales	24,332	2.9	8th

== 2019 general election ==
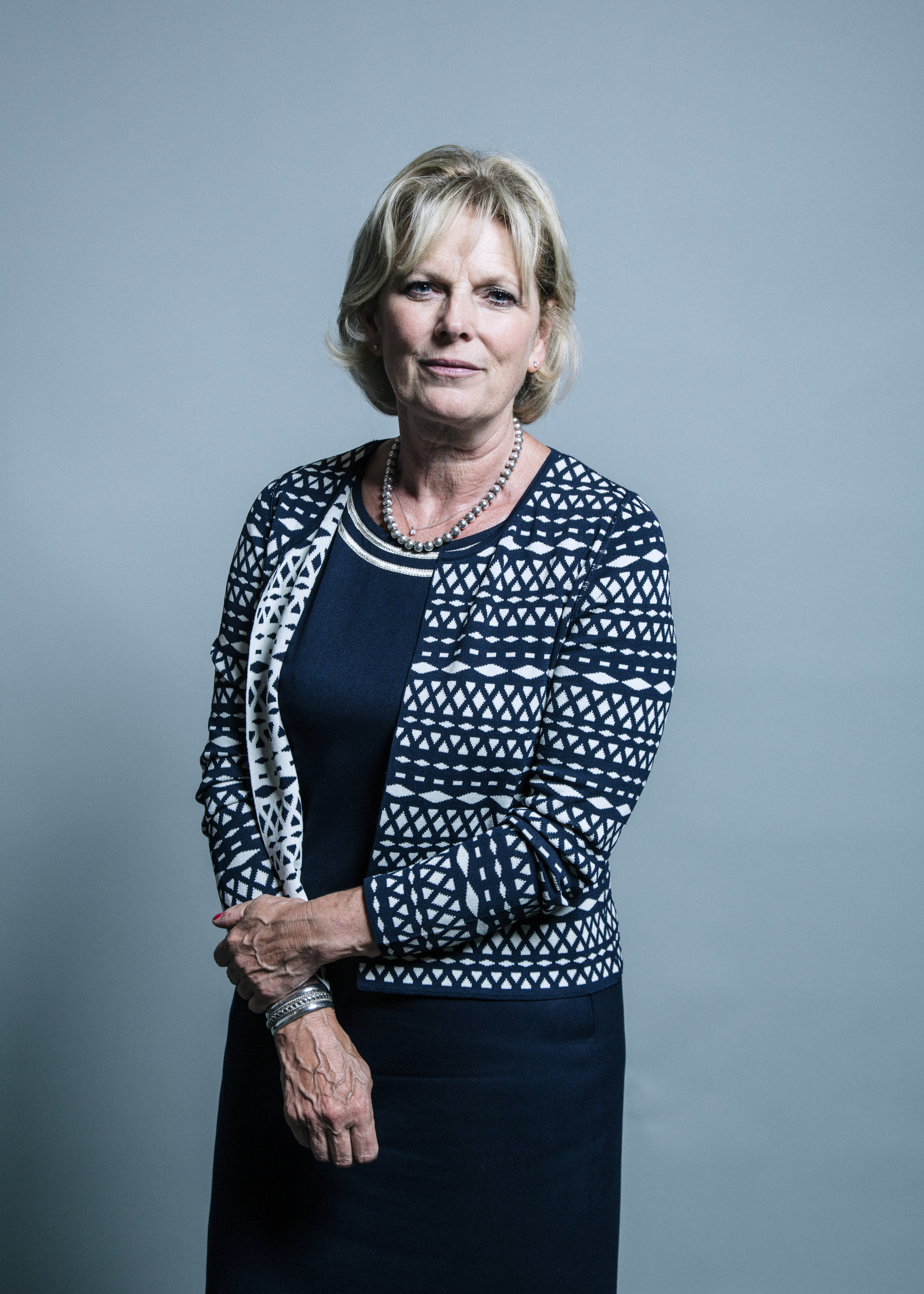
Anna Soubry led the party into the 2019 general election.

Change UK was part of the Unite to Remain electoral pact in the snap 2019 general election. The party only stood in three constituencies, and all three candidates were incumbent Members of Parliament: Anna Soubry, Mike Gapes and Chris Leslie.

The only constituencies with Change UK candidates were Broxtowe, Ilford South and Nottingham East. Ann Coffey and Joan Ryan did not stand for re-election. The Liberal Democrats announced that they would not stand against Anna Soubry in Broxtowe. Only Leslie lost his deposit.

In the election on 12 December 2019, all three of the party's candidates lost their seats: Soubry and Gapes came third in their seats, while Leslie was fourth. Soubry had the highest vote share at 8.5%. Of its six former members, Heidi Allen did not stand in the election, Gavin Shuker stood as an independent candidate and the other four stood for the Liberal Democrats. All lost their seats, with Luciana Berger performing best, coming second with 31.9%, standing in a different constituency, Finchley and Golders Green in North London.

Constituency	County	Winning party in 2017	Winning party in 2019	Candidate	Elected MP	Votes	%	Position
Broxtowe	Nottinghamshire	Conservative	Conservative	Anna Soubry	Darren Henry	4,668	8.5	3rd
Ilford South	Greater London	Labour	Labour	Mike Gapes	Sam Tarry	3,891	7.3	3rd
Nottingham East	Nottinghamshire	Labour	Labour	Chris Leslie	Nadia Whittome	1,447	3.6	4th
