= Unite to Remain =

2019 UK general election campaign

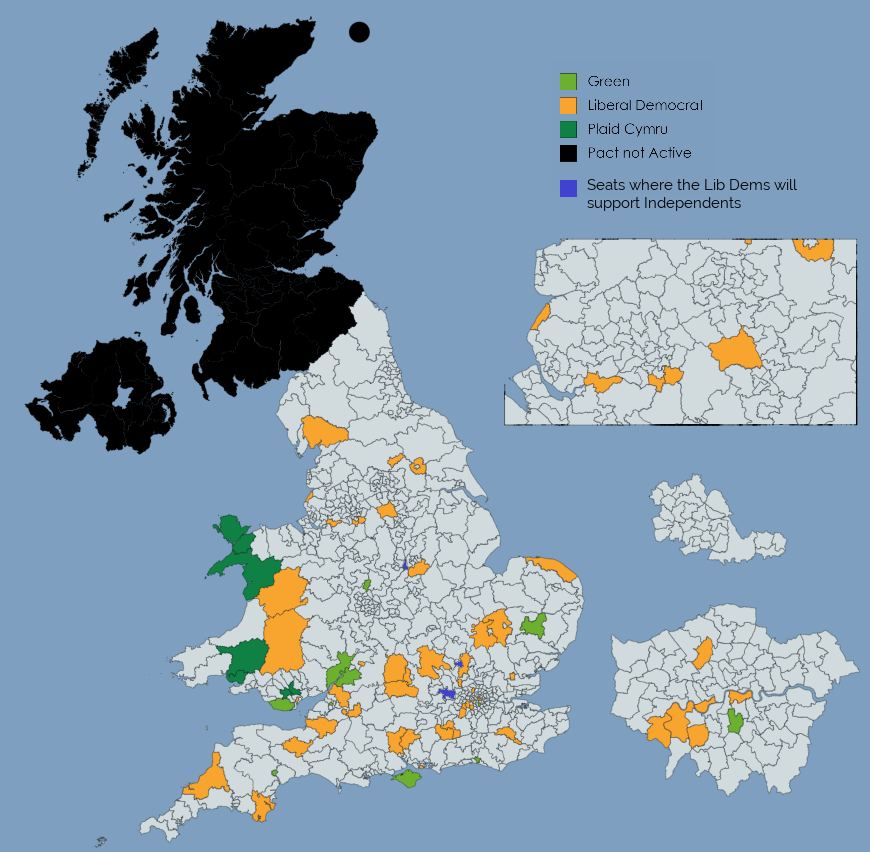
Constituencies covered by the pact, colour-coded by standing party

Unite to Remain (Welsh: Uno i Aros) was a campaign and electoral pact during the 2019 general election. It involved three parties that supported remaining in the European Union: the Liberal Democrats, the Green Party of England and Wales, and, in Wales, Plaid Cymru. Its stated goal was to avoid vote splitting and maximise the number of MPs elected who would oppose Brexit.

In 49 constituencies in England and 11 in Wales, the pact led to only one of these parties standing a candidate. Of the 60 constituencies, 43 had Liberal Democrat candidates only, 10 had Green Party candidates only, and 7 had Plaid Cymru candidates only. The seats covered by the pact included some defended by a Unite to Remain party, as well as target seats held by the Conservative or Labour parties.

Nine Unite to Remain candidates were elected (5 Liberal Democrats, 3 Plaid Cymru, 1 Green), which represented one gain and one loss compared to the 2017 general election results.

== Details ==
Though there was no formal pact, the August 2019 Brecon and Radnorshire by-election saw the Greens and Plaid Cymru stand aside for the Liberal Democrat candidate Jane Dodds, who defeated the Conservative candidate by a small margin. This arrangement was mooted as being the basis for a wider-ranging "Remain Alliance".

The Unite to Remain group which brokered the pact was formed by the outgoing MP for South Cambridgeshire, Heidi Allen and former Liberal Democrat Treasurer Peter Dunphy in July 2019. The alliance approached the Labour party at an early stage, but were rebuffed. The Labour peer Jim Knight was one of the directors of Unite to Remain. The group was registered as a "non-party campaigner" with the Electoral Commission in November 2019.

Seats were selected based on a targeted pooling of resources and only with the consent of local parties. All the parties also support electoral reform. Liberal Democrat activists in constituencies where their party stood aside were encouraged to either campaign for the Unite to Remain candidate there, or to campaign in a nearby seat.

On 13 November 2019, Unite to Remain and the Renew Party announced that Renew would not contest any of the 60 Unite to Remain target seats.

== List of constituencies ==
Incumbents marked in italics did not stand for re-election in that constituency.

Darker rows indicate constituencies where the Unite to Remain party won the previous election (the 2017 general election or the 2019 Brecon and Radnorshire by-election). The pact also covers three seats where, during the 2017–2019 Parliament, incumbent MPs defected from other parties to the Liberal Democrats.

Constituency	Country	Unite to Remain party	Unite to Remain candidate	Incumbent party	Incumbent	Refs	Result
Arfon	Wales	Plaid Cymru	Hywel Williams	Plaid Cymru	Hywel Williams		Elected
Bath	England	Liberal Democrats	Wera Hobhouse	Liberal Democrats	Wera Hobhouse		Elected
Bermondsey and Old Southwark	England	Liberal Democrats	Humaira Ali	Labour	Neil Coyle		Not elected
Brecon and Radnorshire	Wales	Liberal Democrats	Jane Dodds	Liberal Democrats	Jane Dodds		Elected
Brighton Pavilion	England	Green	Caroline Lucas	Green	Caroline Lucas		Elected
Bristol West	England	Green	Carla Denyer	Labour	Thangam Debbonaire		Not elected
Buckingham	England	Liberal Democrats	Stephen Dorrell	Speaker	John Bercow		Not elected
Bury St Edmunds	England	Green	Helen Geake	Conservative	Jo Churchill		Not elected
Caerphilly	Wales	Plaid Cymru	Lindsay Whittle	Labour	Wayne David		Not elected
Cannock Chase	England	Green	Paul Woodhead	Conservative	Amanda Milling		Not elected
Cardiff Central	Wales	Liberal Democrats	Bablin Molik	Labour	Jo Stevens		Not elected
Carmarthen East and Dinefwr	Wales	Plaid Cymru	Jonathan Edwards	Plaid Cymru	Jonathan Edwards		Elected
Cheadle	England	Liberal Democrats	Tom Morrison	Conservative	Mary Robinson		Not elected
Chelmsford	England	Liberal Democrats	Marie Goldman	Conservative	Vicky Ford		Not elected
Chelsea and Fulham	England	Liberal Democrats	Nicola Horlick	Conservative	Greg Hands		Not elected
Cheltenham	England	Liberal Democrats	Max Wilkinson	Conservative	Alex Chalk		Not elected
Chippenham	England	Liberal Democrats	Helen Belcher	Conservative	Michelle Donelan		Not elected
Dulwich and West Norwood	England	Green	Jonathan Bartley	Labour	Helen Hayes		Not elected
Dwyfor Meirionnydd	Wales	Plaid Cymru	Liz Saville Roberts	Plaid Cymru	Liz Saville-Roberts		Elected
Esher and Walton	England	Liberal Democrats	Monica Harding	Conservative	Dominic Raab		Not elected
Exeter	England	Green	Joe Levy	Labour	Ben Bradshaw		Not elected
Finchley and Golders Green	England	Liberal Democrats	Luciana Berger	Conservative	Mike Freer		Not elected
Forest of Dean	England	Green	Chris McFarling	Conservative	Mark Harper		Not elected
Guildford	England	Liberal Democrats	Zöe Franklin	Independent won as Conservative	Anne Milton		Not elected
Harrogate and Knaresborough	England	Liberal Democrats	Judith Rogerson	Conservative	Andrew Jones		Not elected
Hazel Grove	England	Liberal Democrats	Lisa Smart	Conservative	William Wragg		Not elected
Hitchin and Harpenden	England	Liberal Democrats	Sam Collins	Conservative	Bim Afolami		Not elected
Isle of Wight	England	Green	Vix Lowthion	Conservative	Bob Seely		Not elected
Llanelli	Wales	Plaid Cymru	Mari Arthur	Labour	Nia Griffith		Not elected
Montgomeryshire	Wales	Liberal Democrats	Kishan Devani	Conservative	Glyn Davies		Not elected
North Cornwall	England	Liberal Democrats	Danny Chambers	Conservative	Scott Mann		Not elected
North Norfolk	England	Liberal Democrats	Karen Ward	Liberal Democrats	Norman Lamb		Elected
Oxford West and Abingdon	England	Liberal Democrats	Layla Moran	Liberal Democrats	Layla Moran		Elected
Penistone and Stocksbridge	England	Liberal Democrats	Hannah Kitching	Liberal Democrats won as Labour	Angela Smith		Not elected
Pontypridd	Wales	Plaid Cymru	Fflur Elin	Labour	Owen Smith		Not elected
Portsmouth South	England	Liberal Democrats	Gerald Vernon-Jackson	Labour	Stephen Morgan		Not elected
Richmond Park	England	Liberal Democrats	Sarah Olney	Conservative	Zac Goldsmith		Elected
Romsey and Southampton North	England	Liberal Democrats	Craig Fletcher	Conservative	Caroline Nokes		Not elected
Rushcliffe	England	Liberal Democrats	Jason Billin	Independent won as Conservative	Kenneth Clarke		Not elected
Stroud	England	Green	Molly Scott Cato	Labour	David Drew		Not elected
South Cambridgeshire	England	Liberal Democrats	Ian Sollom	Liberal Democrats won as Conservative	Heidi Allen		Not elected
South East Cambridgeshire	England	Liberal Democrats	Pippa Heylings	Conservative	Lucy Frazer		Not elected
South West Surrey	England	Liberal Democrats	Paul Follows	Conservative	Jeremy Hunt		Not elected
Southport	England	Liberal Democrats	John Wright	Conservative	Damien Moore		Not elected
Taunton Deane	England	Liberal Democrats	Gideon Amos	Conservative	Rebecca Pow		Not elected
Thornbury and Yate	England	Liberal Democrats	Claire Young	Conservative	Luke Hall		Not elected
Totnes	England	Liberal Democrats	Sarah Wollaston	Liberal Democrats won as Conservative	Sarah Wollaston		Not elected
Tunbridge Wells	England	Liberal Democrats	Ben Chapelard	Conservative	Greg Clark		Not elected
Twickenham	England	Liberal Democrats	Munira Wilson	Liberal Democrats	Vince Cable		Elected
Wantage	England	Liberal Democrats	Richard Benwell	Conservative	Ed Vaizey		Not elected
Warrington South	England	Liberal Democrats	Ryan Bate	Labour	Faisal Rashid		Not elected
Westmorland and Lonsdale	England	Liberal Democrats	Tim Farron	Liberal Democrats	Tim Farron		Elected
Watford	England	Liberal Democrats	Ian Stotesbury	Conservative	Richard Harrington		Not elected
Wells	England	Liberal Democrats	Tessa Munt	Conservative	James Heappey		Not elected
Wimbledon	England	Liberal Democrats	Paul Kohler	Conservative	Stephen Hammond		Not elected
Winchester	England	Liberal Democrats	Paula Ferguson	Conservative	Steve Brine		Not elected
Witney	England	Liberal Democrats	Charlotte Hoagland	Conservative	Robert Courts		Not elected
Vale of Glamorgan	Wales	Green	Anthony Slaughter	Conservative	Alun Cairns		Not elected
York Outer	England	Liberal Democrats	Keith Aspden	Conservative	Julian Sturdy		Not elected
Ynys Môn	Wales	Plaid Cymru	Aled ap Dafydd	Labour	Albert Owen		Not elected

== Pre-election analysis ==
Psephologist John Curtice stated that the pact could be critical in "half a dozen" seats that could have otherwise been won by the Conservatives.

An analysis published in the Financial Times attempted to evaluate the potential impact of the pact. This analysis applied uniform regional swing based on polling (as of early November) to the 2017 result to estimate the parties' standings in the seats before the pact, then assumed that voters for parties standing aside would transfer their support as per the pact. The analysis found that in 18 seats the Unite to Remain party would not need the pact in order to win, in 39 the pact would be insufficient to secure victory, and in two (Brecon and Radnorshire and Winchester) the pact would make the critical difference between winning and losing for the Unite to Remain party.

== Other pro-Remain arrangements ==
In addition to the Unite to Remain pact, the Liberal Democrats did not stand candidates against the following anti-Brexit or "soft Brexit" supporting incumbents:

- Dominic Grieve (independent), Beaconsfield
- Gavin Shuker (independent), Luton South
- Anna Soubry (The Independent Group for Change), Broxtowe

All failed to be elected.

In Canterbury, the original Liberal Democrat candidate (Tim Walker) stood down in aid of the Labour incumbent Rosie Duffield, but the Lib Dems stood a replacement candidate. Duffield retained her seat.

In Northern Ireland, Sinn Féin, the SDLP and the Green Party in Northern Ireland all stood aside in certain constituencies to increase the chances of anti-Brexit candidates.

== See also ==
- 2019 United Kingdom general election#Electoral pacts and unilateral decisions
- Liberal Democrat–Green Party alliance
