= One Nation Conservatives (caucus) =

British caucus of the Conservative Party

- Chairman: Damian Green
- Founded: 30 March 2019; 7 years ago
- Ideology: One-nation conservatism
- Political position: Centre-right
- National affiliation: Conservative Party
- Colours: Blue
- House of Commons (Conservative seats): 8 / 121 (Identified members after 2024 election)

Website
- onenationconservatives.co.uk (now defunct)

The One Nation Conservatives is a UK parliamentary caucus of Conservative Party Members of Parliament who identify as one-nation conservatives.

== History ==
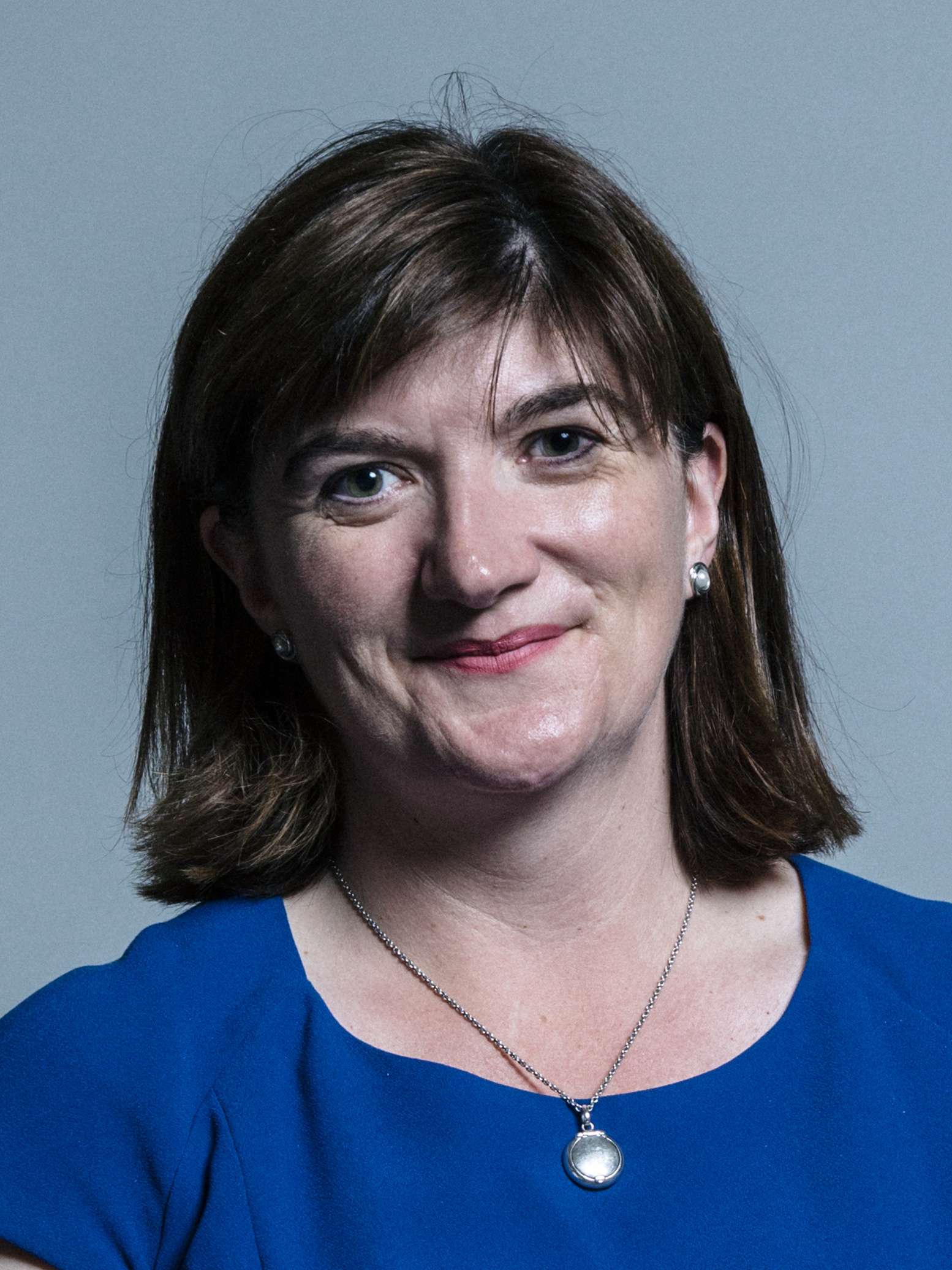
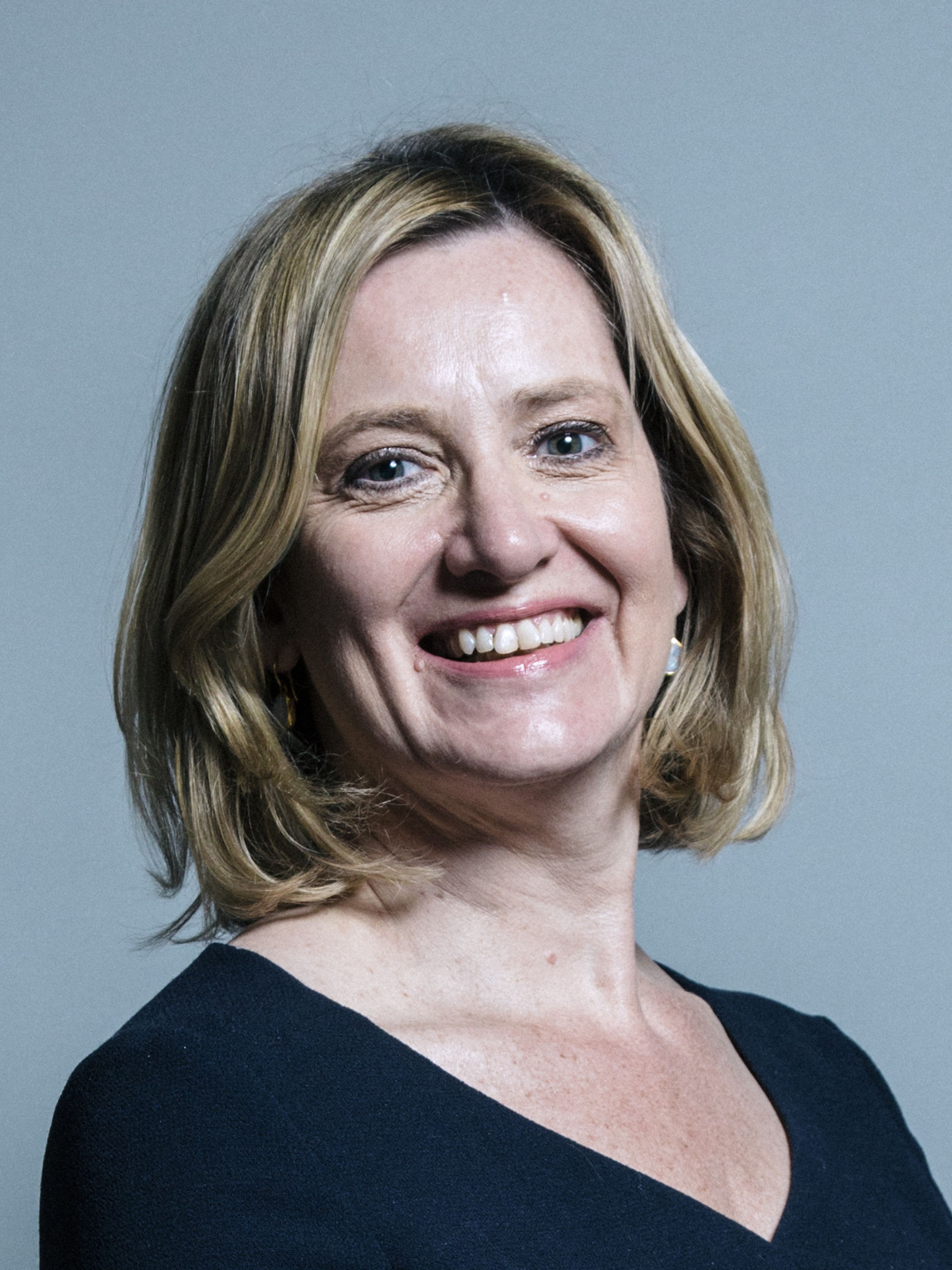
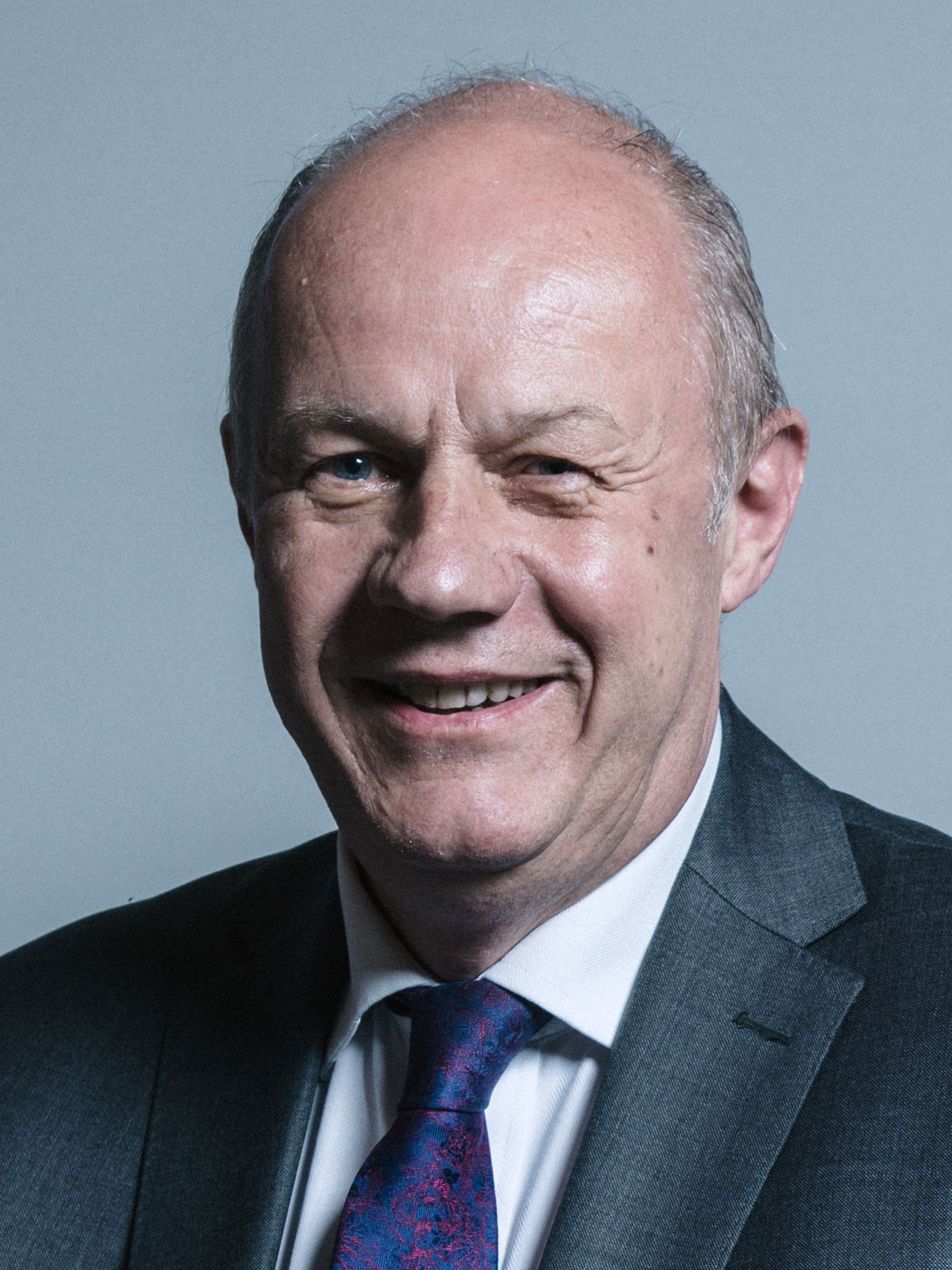
Caucus Chairs: Morgan and Rudd (March – July 2019),
Damian Green (since July 2019).

In March 2019, the caucus was formed by a group of between 40 and 50 Conservative MPs. Nicky Morgan and Amber Rudd were announced as co-chairs of the caucus, and Damian Green and Nicholas Soames as board members. The One Nation group was reportedly set up in order to unite MPs around a candidate in the upcoming leadership election who would oppose withdrawing from the European Union without a deal.

On 4 June 2019, the caucus hosted the first leadership election hustings, held across two nights. Both events featured 4 different candidates; the first was chaired by Katy Balls (deputy political editor of The Spectator) and the second by Matt Forde.

Following Boris Johnson's election as party leader and appointment as Prime Minister, both co-chairs were given positions in his government. Morgan became the new Culture Secretary and Rudd carried on in her role as Work and Pensions Secretary. As a result, they both resigned the chairmanship and were succeeded by Damian Green.

On 3 September 2019, 21 Conservative MPs had the party whip withdrawn after voting in support of an emergency motion to enable the passage of the European Union (Withdrawal) (No. 2) Act 2019, also known as the "Benn Act". The One Nation caucus released a statement soon after, demanding that the whip be restored.

In October, a delegation of caucus members met the Prime Minister Boris Johnson in 10 Downing Street to discuss the party's position on a no-deal Brexit at the next general election. Following the meeting, Green announced that Johnson had 'looked him in the eye' and assured them that the next Conservative manifesto would not include a no-deal pledge. It was reported that a number of Cabinet ministers and backbench MPs would be willing to resign in the event that such a manifesto commitment were made.

Since 2023, the group's size and influence has been in decline.

== Declaration of Values ==
In May 2019, the caucus published a "Declaration of Values", covering a range of domestic, economic and foreign policy issues.

The United Kingdom: we believe in the United Kingdom as the embodiment of our shared values and as a force for good in defending our values in the world: we are patriotic Conservatives who reject narrow nationalism.

Active global leadership: we believe the UK must be a leader on the world stage through our aid, trade and security commitments to tackle global challenges as a global citizen, through a strong defence and soft power commitment.

Life Chances: we believe that everyone in our country – whoever and wherever they are from – has an equal right to a fair chance in life, and that bold reforms to welfare & vocational skills are central to tackling social injustice and creating an opportunity society.

Social Responsibility: we believe in a strong society, and a social contract between all of us as fellow citizens, supported in our tax and welfare system.

Public Services: we believe in our public services, properly funded by a growing economy, as fundamental to the wellbeing of our nation, in a mixed economy of public, private and third sector providers.

Localism: we believe in the importance of place and Conservatives supporting the local, civic and voluntary over the bureaucratic, statist and compulsory.

Environmental Stewardship: we believe that we all have a responsibility to act as stewards of our local and global environment, for the next generation, and as a duty to show global leadership on climate change and biodiversity.

Markets and values: we believe in free enterprise, business and the market economy with a framework of good regulation to enhance competition, support innovation, break monopolies, empower citizens and reflect our shared values.

Law and Human rights: we believe in universal human rights and the rule of law and are proud of our country and Party's record in promoting them through an independent judiciary, effective enforcement, community policing & policies to prevent crime & social breakdown.

Democratic renewal: we believe that civilised, open respectful political debate in our Party, Parliament & free press, and a vibrant arts & cultural sector, is fundamental to strengthening the health of our society and democracy.

== Membership ==
It was estimated that the caucus consisted of approximately 110 Conservative MPs in February 2020. Although a full list has not been made public, individual MPs have been identified by the press. They include:

A current member of the House of Commons
A current member of the House of Lords

MP	Constituency	Notes
Bim Afolami	Hitchin and Harpenden	
Guto Bebb	Aberconwy	Independent MP (3 September – 6 November 2019)
The Lord Benyon	Newbury	Independent MP (3 September – 29 October 2019)
Steve Brine	Winchester	Independent MP (3 September – 29 October 2019)
James Brokenshire	Old Bexley and Sidcup	Secretary of State for Northern Ireland (July 2016 – January 2018); Communities Secretary (April 2018 – July 2019); Minister of State for Security
Anthony Browne	South Cambridgeshire	
Robert Buckland	South Swindon	Justice Secretary (July 2019 – September 2021)
Alistair Burt	North East Bedfordshire	Independent MP (3 September – 29 October 2019)
Andy Carter	Warrington South	
Greg Clark	Tunbridge Wells	Business Secretary (July 2016 – July 2019); Independent MP (3 September – 29 October 2019)
The Lord Clarke of Nottingham	Rushcliffe	Paymaster General (September 1985 – July 1987); Chancellor of the Duchy of Lancaster (July 1987 – July 1988); Secretary of State for Health (July 1988 – November 1990); Secretary of State for Education and Science (November 1990 – April 1992); Home Secretary (April 1992 – May 1993); Chancellor of the Exchequer (May 1993 – May 1997); Secretary of State for Justice and Lord High Chancellor of Great Britain (May 2010 – September 2012); Minister without portfolio (September 2012 – July 2014); Father of the House of Commons (February 2017 – November 2019); Independent MP (3 September – 6 November 2019)
Alberto Costa	South Leicestershire	
Stephen Crabb	Preseli Pembrokeshire	Secretary of State for Wales (July 2014 – March 2016); Secretary of State for Work and Pensions (March – July 2016)
Tobias Ellwood	Bournemouth East	
Laura Farris	Newbury	
Vicky Ford	Chelmsford	Minister for Children (February 2020 – Present)
George Freeman	Mid Norfolk	-
Mark Garnier	Wyre Forest	
David Gauke	South West Hertfordshire	Chief Secretary to the Treasury (July 2016 – June 2017); Secretary of State for Work and Pensions (June 2017 – January 2018); Justice Secretary (January 2018 – July 2019); Independent MP (3 September – 6 November 2019)
Damian Green	Ashford	Secretary of State for Work and Pensions (July 2016 – June 2017); First Secretary of State and Minister for the Cabinet Office (June – December 2017); One Nation Conservative Caucus Chair (since July 2019)
Justine Greening	Putney	Secretary of State for Transport (October 2011 – September 2012); Secretary of State for International Development (September 2012 – July 2016); Secretary of State for Education and Minister for Women and Equalities (July 2016 – January 2018); Independent MP (3 September – 6 November 2019)
Dominic Grieve	Beaconsfield	Attorney General for England and Wales (May 2010 – July 2014); Independent MP (3 September – 6 November 2019)
Sam Gyimah	East Surrey	Independent MP (3 September – 14 September 2019); Liberal Democrat MP (14 September – 6 November 2019)
Robert Halfon	Harlow	Minister without portfolio (May 2015 – July 2016)
The Lord Hammond of Runnymede	Runnymede and Weybridge	Secretary of State for Transport (May 2010 – October 2011); Secretary of State for Defence (October 2011 – July 2014); Secretary of State for Foreign and Commonwealth Affairs (July 2014 – July 2016); Chancellor of the Exchequer (July 2016 – July 2019); Independent MP (3 September – 6 November 2019)
Stephen Hammond	Wimbledon	Independent MP (3 September – 29 October 2019)
Matt Hancock	West Suffolk	Minister for the Cabinet Office and Paymaster General (May 2015 – July 2016); Secretary of State for Digital, Culture, Media and Sport (January – July 2018); Secretary of State for Health and Social Care (since July 2018)
The Lord Harrington of Watford	Watford	Independent MP (3 September – 29 October 2019)
Simon Hoare	North Dorset	
Margot James	Stourbridge	Independent MP (3 September – 29 October 2019)
Gillian Keegan	Chichester	
Sir Oliver Letwin	West Dorset	Minister of State for Government Policy (May 2010 – May 2015); Chancellor of the Duchy of Lancaster (July 2014 – July 2016); Independent MP (3 September – 6 November 2019)
Jerome Mayhew	Broadland	
Anne Milton	Guildford	Independent MP (3 September – 6 November 2019)
The Baroness Morgan of Cotes	Loughborough	Minister for Women (April 2014 – July 2016); Secretary of State for Education (July 2014 – July 2016); One Nation Conservative Caucus Co-Chair (March – July 2019); Culture Secretary (July 2019 – February 2020)
David Mundell	Dumfriesshire, Clydesdale and Tweeddale	Scottish Secretary (May 2015 – July 2019)
Sir Bob Neill	Bromley and Chislehurst	
Caroline Nokes	Romsey and Southampton North	Minister of State for Immigration (January 2018 – July 2019); Independent MP (3 September – 29 October 2019)
Guy Opperman	Hexham	
Claire Perry	Devizes	Energy Minister (June 2017 – July 2019)
Victoria Prentis	Banbury	
Amber Rudd	Hastings and Rye	Secretary of State for Energy and Climate Change (May 2015 – July 2016); Home Secretary (July 2016 – April 2018); One Nation Conservative Caucus Co-Chair (March – July 2019); Work and Pensions Secretary (November 2018 – September 2019); Minister for Women and Equalities (January – April 2018, July – September 2019); Independent MP (7 September – 6 November 2019)
Chloe Smith	Norwich North	
Antoinette Sandbach	Eddisbury	Independent MP (3 September – 31 October 2019); Liberal Democrat MP (31 October – 6 November 2019)
Sir Nicholas Soames	Mid Sussex	Independent MP (3 September – 29 October 2019)
Rory Stewart	Penrith and The Border	International Development Secretary (May – July 2019); Independent MP (3 September – 6 November 2019)
Tom Tugendhat	Tonbridge	
The Lord Vaizey of Didcot	Wantage	Independent MP (3 September – 29 October 2019)

=== Leadership ===
Term start	Term end	Chair(s)
30 March 2019	24 July 2019	Nicky Morgan
30 March 2019	24 July 2019	Amber Rudd
24 July 2019	present	Damian Green MP

== See also ==
- Tory Reform Group
- European Research Group
