= Navendu Mishra =

British politician (born 1989)

Navendu Mishra MP
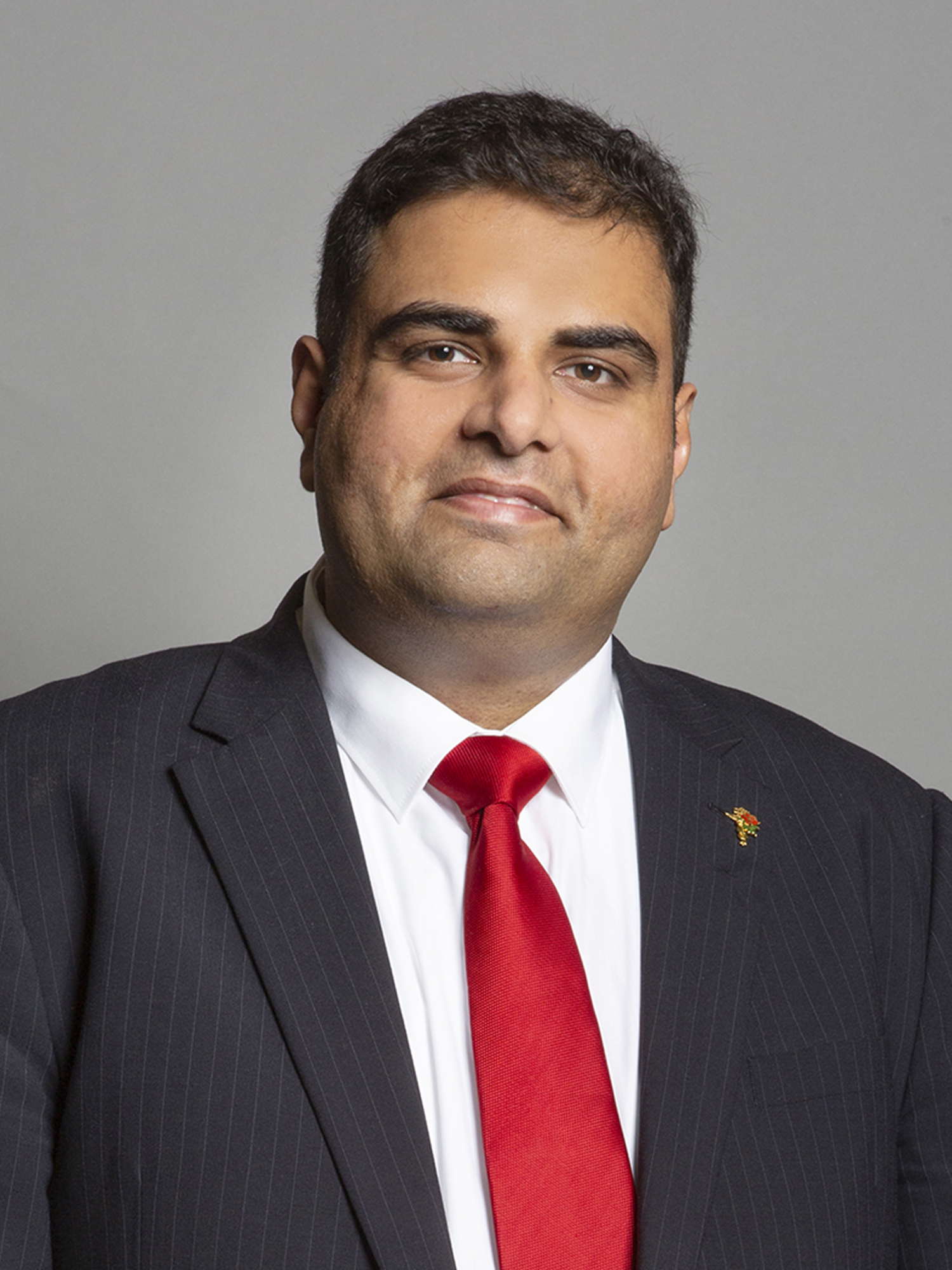
- Official portrait, 2019

Member of Parliament for Stockport
- Incumbent
- Assumed office 12 December 2019
- Preceded by: Ann Coffey
- Majority: 15,270

Personal details
- Born: Navendu Prabhat Mishra; 22 August 1989 (age 37)
- Party: Labour
- Education: Clifton College
- Alma mater: University of Hull; Keele University
- Occupation: Politician
- Website: www.navendumishra.co.uk

Navendu Prabhat Mishra (born 22 August 1989) is a British Labour Party politician who has served as the Member of Parliament (MP) for Stockport since 2019.

Navendu currently serves as the chair for the All-Party Parliamentary Group (APPG) on Cancer.

== Early life and career ==
Navendu Mishra was born on 22 August 1989 to Indian parents, with his mother from Gorakhpur and his father from Kanpur, both in Uttar Pradesh. He was privately educated at Clifton College in Bristol, before studying at the University of Hull and Keele University.

Before entering politics, Mishra worked for the John Lewis Partnership and UNISON where he was a shop floor trade unionist in Stockport, eventually becoming an organiser for Unison and helping to organise care workers in precarious employment.

== Political career ==
Mishra was one of the founders of Stockport Momentum and supported Jeremy Corbyn in the 2015 Labour leadership election and 2016 Labour leadership election.

He served as a member of the National Executive Committee of the Labour Party from September 2018 until December 2019. As he was one of the nine representatives for Constituency Labour Parties, Mishra was ineligible to remain a member of the NEC upon his election as a Member of Parliament.

== Parliamentary career ==
At the snap 2017 general election, Mishra stood in Hazel Grove, coming third with 20.5% of the vote behind the incumbent Conservative candidate William Wragg and the Liberal Democrat candidate.

Mishra was selected as Labour's candidate for Stockport at the 2019 general election after the incumbent, Ann Coffey, left the Labour Party in protest over Jeremy Corbyn's leadership and joined Change UK. At the general election, Mishru was elected to Parliament as MP for Stockport with 52% of the vote and a majority of 10,039.

Mishra has been a member of the Socialist Campaign Group and endorsed Rebecca Long-Bailey in the 2020 Labour leadership election. In May 2024, PoliticsHome reported that he had left the Campaign Group.

On 15 October 2020, Mishra resigned as Parliamentary Private Secretary (PPS) to Angela Rayner to vote against the proposed Covert Human Intelligence Sources (Criminal Conduct) Bill, rebelling against the Labour whip to abstain.

During the 2021 Batley and Spen by-election, Mishra accused his own party of having a "hierarchy of racism", with "some groups seen as fair game for attacks based on religion/race/heritage".

At the 2024 general election, Mishra was re-elected to Parliament as MP for Stockport with a decreased vote share of 49.9% and an increased majority of 15,270.

In November 2024, it was reported that Mishra tabled a series of parliamentary questions on Indian interests while failing to declare donations and travel worth thousands of pounds from India industrial lobbyist FICCI, and the Indian High Commission to the UK.

== Personal life ==
Mishra lives in Brinnington, and is a member of Offerton cricket club. Mishra is also a member of the Civil Service Club, a Social Club based in London.

Parliament of the United Kingdom
Preceded by Ann Coffey	Member of Parliament for Stockport; 2019–present	Incumbent
