= Anthony Favell =

British politician (born 1939)

Member of Parliament for Stockport
- In office 9 June 1983 – 16 March 1992
- Preceded by: Constituency created
- Succeeded by: Ann Coffey

Personal details
- Born: 29 May 1939 (age 87)
- Party: Conservative
- Website: High Peak Conservatives

Anthony Rowland "Tony" Favell MBE (born 29 Мay 1939), is a former British Conservative Member of Parliament.

== Parliamentary career ==
Favell first stood for Parliament in 1979 for Bolsover, but was beaten by Labour's Dennis Skinner. He later became MP for Stockport from 1983 until 1992, when he was defeated by Ann Coffey of Labour.

In 1990, Favell resigned as John Major's Parliamentary private secretary in a disagreement over whether the UK should enter the European Exchange Rate Mechanism.

== Later life ==
After losing his Parliamentary seat Tony Favell, a solicitor, who was the founder of the Sheffield firm Favell Smith & Lawson, returned to the law as a consultant with Gorvins Solicitors in Stockport and became Chair of Tameside Hospital in Ashton-under-Lyne. Later he became a Tribunal Judge. In 2007 Favell was elected to High Peak Borough Council for the Hope Valley ward. He did not stand for re-election in 2015. Whilst a councillor he was appointed to Peak District National Park Authority. He was elected the Authority's Chair and became Chair of National Parks UK. Favell was awarded an MBE in 2013.

Civic offices
Preceded by Ron Priestley	Councillor for Hope Valley Ward on High Peak Borough Council; 2007–2015.	Succeeded by Sarah Helliwell
Parliament of the United Kingdom
New constituency	Member of Parliament for Stockport; 1983–1992	Succeeded by Ann Coffey
