= European Parliament constituencies in the United Kingdom =

Former European Parliament constituencies

This is a table of the former European Parliament constituencies in the United Kingdom, listing the number of Members of the European Parliament each elected at each European Parliamentary election. The United Kingdom left the European Union on 31 January 2020. As a result, these constituencies no longer exist.

Great Britain was divided into single-member first-past-the-post constituencies from the 1979 election until the 1999 election, when it was divided into eleven multi-member D'Hondt party list constituencies. Northern Ireland was a single constituency using Single Transferable Vote from 1979 to 2020.

With the exception of Gibraltar's inclusion in South West England, the constituencies otherwise corresponded with the NUTS 1 regions of the United Kingdom, though the naming differed slightly to distinguish them from other European constituencies.

Map of European Parliament constituencies in the United Kingdom (2004–2020)

Election	Constituencies												Total seats
(1973)	(MEPs nominated by Parliament)												36
	English MEPs elected from single-member First Past the Post constituencies									Welsh FPTP constituencies	Scottish FPTP constituencies	Northern Ireland	
1979	66									4	8	3	81
1984	66									4	8	3	81
1989	66									4	8	3	81
1994	71									5	8	3	87
	London	South West England	South East England	East of England	West Midlands	East Midlands	North West England	North East England	Yorkshire and the Humber	Wales	Scotland	Northern Ireland	
1999	10	7	11	8	8	6	10	4	7	5	8	3	87
2004	9	7 (Note: From 2004, South West England included Gibraltar, the only British overseas territory that was part of the European Union prior to the UK's withdrawal.)	10	7	7	6	9	3	6	4	7	3	78
2009	8	6	10	7	6 (Note: In November 2011, provisions of the Treaty of Lisbon came into effect, granting the UK a 73rd MEP. The UK assigned this seat to the West Midlands, the constituency with the most constituents per MEP, giving it a 7th MEP again (Conservative Anthea McIntyre, based on the 2009 election results).)	5	8	3	6	4	6	3	72
2014	8	6	10	7	7	5	8	3	6	4	6	3	73
2019	8	6	10	7	7	5	8	3	6	4	6	3	73

== See also ==
- European Parliament constituencies in the Republic of Ireland
