= List of MPs who stood down at the 2019 United Kingdom general election =

MPs standing down at the 2019 UK general election

This is a list of members of Parliament (MPs) who held seats at the end of the 57th Parliament of the United Kingdom who announced they would not stand for reelection in the 2019 general election.

Former Labour MP John Mann (Bassetlaw) and Speaker of the House of Commons John Bercow (Buckingham) are not included in this list as they resigned on 28 October and 4 November 2019, respectively, meaning that their seats were vacant at dissolution.

== List of MPs ==
A total of 74 members announced their decision not to stand for re-election:

MP	Seat	First elected	Party	Date announced
Heidi Allen	South Cambridgeshire	2015 (as Conservative)	Liberal Democrats	29 October 2019
Ian Austin	Dudley North	2005 (as Labour)	Independent	7 November 2019
Adrian Bailey	West Bromwich West	2000 by-election	Labour	30 October 2019
Kevin Barron	Rother Valley	1983	Labour	3 July 2019
Guto Bebb	Aberconwy	2010 (as Conservative)	Independent	14 July 2019
Henry Bellingham	North West Norfolk	1983	Conservative	4 November 2019
Richard Benyon	Newbury	2005	Conservative	9 September 2019
Roberta Blackman-Woods	City of Durham	2005	Labour	15 July 2019
Nick Boles	Grantham and Stamford	2010 (as Conservative)	Independent	15 April 2019
Alistair Burt	North East Bedfordshire	1983 (Bury North)	Conservative	3 September 2019
Vince Cable	Twickenham	1997	Liberal Democrats	22 July 2019
Ronnie Campbell	Blyth Valley	1987	Labour	24 June 2019
Kenneth Clarke	Rushcliffe	1970 (as Conservative)	Independent	27 June 2019
Ann Clwyd	Cynon Valley	1984 by-election	Labour	28 September 2019
Ann Coffey	Stockport	1992 (as Labour)	Change UK	30 October 2019
Jim Cunningham	Coventry South	1992 (Coventry South East)	Labour	9 September 2019
Glyn Davies	Montgomeryshire	2010	Conservative	13 May 2019
Gloria De Piero	Ashfield	2010	Labour	19 July 2019
Alan Duncan	Rutland and Melton	1992	Conservative	30 October 2019
Louise Ellman	Liverpool Riverside	1997 (as Labour and Co-operative)	Independent	29 October 2019
Charlie Elphicke	Dover	2010 (as Conservative)	Independent	8 November 2019
Michael Fallon	Sevenoaks	1983 (Darlington)	Conservative	4 September 2019
Paul Farrelly	Newcastle-under-Lyme	2001	Labour	7 September 2019
Mark Field	Cities of London and Westminster	2001	Conservative	17 October 2019
Jim Fitzpatrick	Poplar and Limehouse	1997	Labour	24 June 2019
Bill Grant	Ayr, Carrick and Cumnock	2017	Conservative	10 September 2019
Justine Greening	Putney	2005 (as Conservative)	Independent	3 September 2019
Andrew Griffiths	Burton	2010	Conservative	12 November 2019
Philip Hammond	Runnymede and Weybridge	1997 (as Conservative)	Independent	5 November 2019
Richard Harrington	Watford	2010	Conservative	29 August 2019
Peter Heaton-Jones	North Devon	2015	Conservative	30 October 2019
Stephen Hepburn	Jarrow	1997 (as Labour)	Independent	14 November 2019 (Note: De facto announced by publishing of statements of nominated persons in Jarrow not including Hepburn and no publicly voiced intention to stand elsewhere. No later releases had Hepburn as a candidate.)
Nick Herbert	Arundel and South Downs	2005	Conservative	5 November 2019
Sylvia Hermon	North Down	2001 (as Ulster Unionist)	Independent	6 November 2019
Kate Hoey	Vauxhall	1989 by-election	Labour	8 July 2019
George Hollingbery	Meon Valley	2010	Conservative	7 November 2019
Kelvin Hopkins	Luton North	1997 (as Labour)	Independent	31 October 2019
Nick Hurd	Ruislip, Northwood and Pinner	2005 (Ruislip-Northwood)	Conservative	5 September 2019
Margot James	Stourbridge	2010	Conservative	3 November 2019
Jo Johnson	Orpington	2010	Conservative	5 September 2019
Helen Jones	Warrington North	1997	Labour	30 October 2019
Seema Kennedy	South Ribble	2015	Conservative	25 October 2019
Norman Lamb	North Norfolk	2001	Liberal Democrats	27 August 2019
Mark Lancaster	Milton Keynes North	2005 (North East Milton Keynes)	Conservative	2 November 2019
Jeremy Lefroy	Stafford	2010	Conservative	14 June 2019
Oliver Letwin	West Dorset	1997 (as Conservative)	Independent	21 August 2019
David Lidington	Aylesbury	1992	Conservative	30 October 2019
Ian Lucas	Wrexham	2001	Labour	11 October 2019
Patrick McLoughlin	Derbyshire Dales	1986 by-election	Conservative	30 October 2019
Nicky Morgan	Loughborough	2010	Conservative	30 October 2019
Sarah Newton	Truro and Falmouth	2010	Conservative	28 October 2019
Jared O'Mara	Sheffield Hallam	2017 (as Labour)	Independent	30 October 2019
Albert Owen	Ynys Môn	2001	Labour	14 August 2019
Teresa Pearce	Erith and Thamesmead	2010	Labour	8 July 2019
Claire Perry	Devizes	2010	Conservative	6 September 2019
Stephen Pound	Ealing North	1997	Labour	8 July 2019
Mark Prisk	Hertford and Stortford	2001	Conservative	9 September 2019
Geoffrey Robinson	Coventry North West	1976 by-election	Labour	8 July 2019
Amber Rudd	Hastings and Rye	2010 (as Conservative)	Independent	30 October 2019
Joan Ryan	Enfield North	1997 (as Labour)	Change UK	16 September 2019
David Simpson	Upper Bann	2005	DUP	6 November 2019
Keith Simpson	Broadland	1997 (Mid Norfolk)	Conservative	3 September 2019
Owen Smith	Pontypridd	2010	Labour	29 October 2019
Nicholas Soames	Mid Sussex	1983 (Crawley)	Conservative	3 September 2019
Caroline Spelman	Meriden	1997	Conservative	5 September 2019
Rory Stewart	Penrith and The Border	2010 (as Conservative)	Independent	4 October 2019
Hugo Swire	East Devon	2001	Conservative	12 September 2019
Ross Thomson	Aberdeen South	2017	Conservative	3 November 2019
David Tredinnick	Bosworth	1987	Conservative	15 February 2019
Stephen Twigg	Liverpool West Derby	1997 (Enfield Southgate)	Labour	8 July 2019
Ed Vaizey	Wantage	2005	Conservative	6 November 2019
Keith Vaz	Leicester East	1987	Labour	10 November 2019
Tom Watson	West Bromwich East	2001	Labour	6 November 2019
John Woodcock	Barrow and Furness	2010 (as Labour)	Independent	4 November 2019
