= Gavin Shuker =

British Independent politician

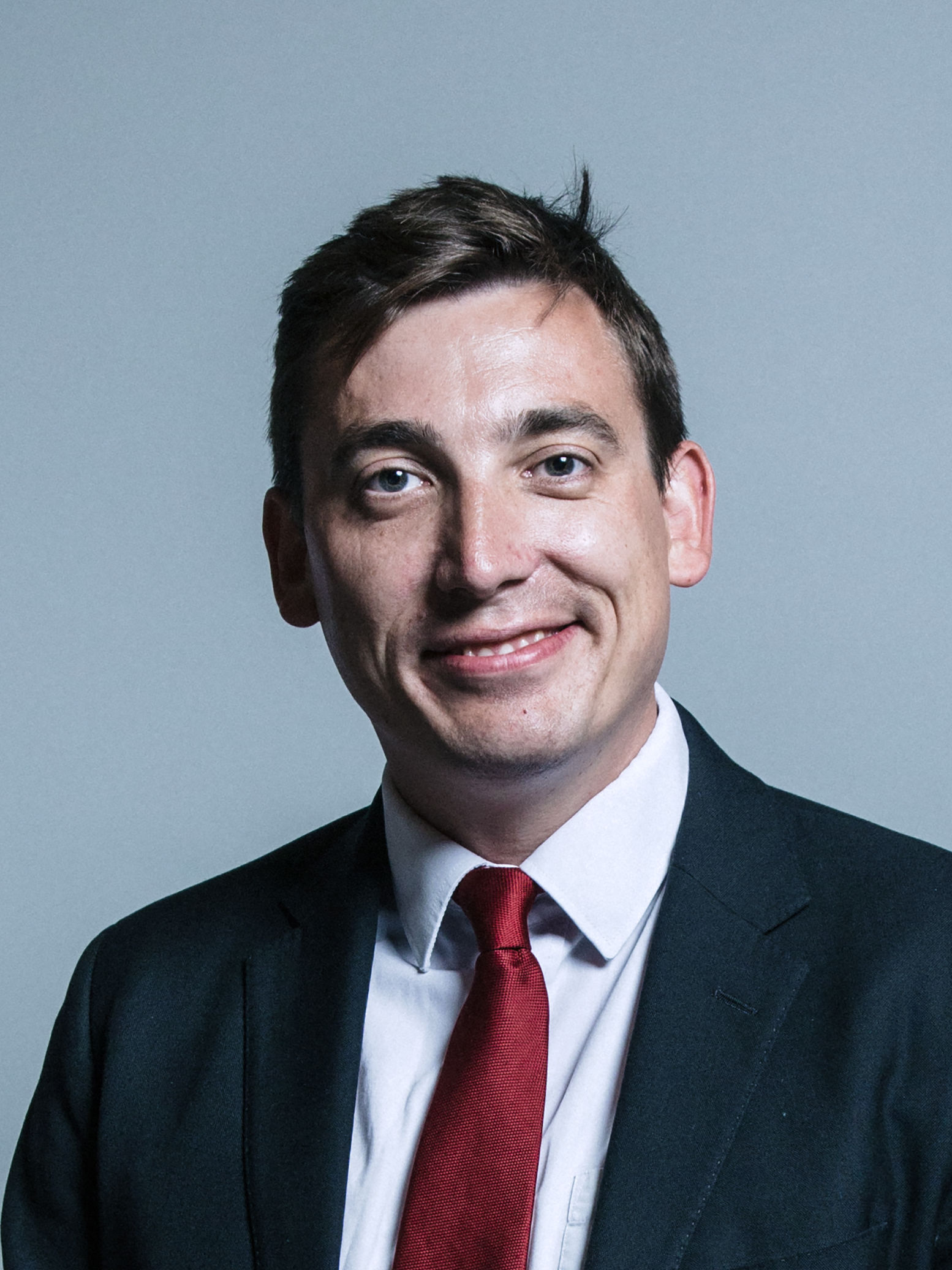
- Official portrait, 2017

Convener of Change UK
- In office 25 February 2019 – 4 June 2019
- Leader: Heidi Allen (Acting)
- Preceded by: Office established
- Succeeded by: Office abolished

Member of Parliament for Luton South
- In office 6 May 2010 – 6 November 2019
- Preceded by: Margaret Moran
- Succeeded by: Rachel Hopkins

Personal details
- Born: 10 October 1981 (age 44) Luton, England
- Party: Parliamentary affiliation: The Independents (2019); Party membership: Independent (2019–present)
- Other political affiliations: Change UK (Feb–Jun 2019); Labour and Co-operative (Until Feb 2019)
- Spouse: Lucie Shuker (Divorced 2016)
- Children: 1 daughter
- Education: Girton College, Cambridge
- Website: Official website

Gavin Shuker (born 10 October 1981) is a British former politician who served as the Member of Parliament (MP) for Luton South from 2010 to 2019. Shuker was a Labour and Co-operative Party MP before defecting to form Change UK. He then left Change UK to become an Independent politician and was defeated at the 2019 election, coming third with 9.3% of the vote.

Shuker successfully defended the seat as the Labour candidate in 2010, after his predecessor Margaret Moran stood down following controversy over her expenses. Shuker was appointed as a Shadow International Development Minister by Ed Miliband in 2013. He left the Opposition Frontbench in September 2015, with the election of Jeremy Corbyn as Party Leader, citing "political differences" with him. In 2018, he lost a motion of no confidence by his constituency party. Shuker resigned from Labour on 18 February 2019 with six other MPs, and they formed Change UK. In June 2019, he left Change UK to sit as an independent MP. He stood as an independent in the 2019 general election but lost his seat.

== Education and early life ==
A Lutonian, Shuker was educated at two state schools: Icknield Primary and Icknield High School. He was head boy at the latter. He then attended Luton Sixth Form College before going on to acquire a degree in Social and Political Sciences at Girton College, Cambridge.

Shuker became leader and pastor of the City Life Church in Luton until he stood for parliament.

== Political career ==
In May 2010 he was elected in Luton South, with a majority of 2,329 votes (5.5%) over the Conservative candidate Nigel Huddleston, and with the journalist and broadcaster Esther Rantzen a distant fourth. In October 2010, he was appointed PPS to the Shadow Secretary of State for Justice, Sadiq Khan, and was also appointed to the transport select committee. In March 2011 he was promoted again to become Shadow Minister at the Department for Environment, Food and Rural Affairs with responsibility for water and waste.

He was a member of Christians on the Left and a Vice-Chair of Christians in Parliament.

Contrary to a newspaper piece written about Shuker, he was not opposed to the introduction of same-sex marriage. He wrote he had "misgivings about how legally robust safeguards [which were put in place to prevent religious groups from being forced to carry out ceremonies] were in legislation", but he did not block the legislation and indeed voted for its implementation in later divisions.

In the October 2013 reshuffle, he was shifted to the Shadow International Development team as a Shadow Minister of State. His brief covered policy on Asia, Latin America and the Middle East, in addition to responsibility for policy on climate change, inequality, violence against women and girls and the post-2015 SDG agenda. As part of his Shadow Ministerial role, Shuker visited Palestine, Pakistan, El Salvador and the United Nations at Geneva and New York.

Alongside his frontbench activities, Shuker has served as Chair of the All-Party Parliamentary Group on Prostitution and the Global Sex Trade, Vice-Chair of the Polar Regions All-Party Parliamentary Group, Vice-Chair of the Christians in Parliament APPG and Vice-Chair of the Thameslink Route APPG. He was a member of other APPGs, including the group on Kashmir, East-West Rail and Human Trafficking and Modern Day Slavery.

In March 2014 under Shuker's chairmanship, the APPG on Prostitution and the Global Sex Trade published a new report on the legal state of prostitution in England and Wales. The result of a year-long consultation it was the first major cross-party report on the issue since the mid-1990s. The report called for a wholesale review of the existing legal settlement on prostitution, advocating consideration of a move towards the so-called 'Nordic model'. In the foreword to the APPG's report, Shuker wrote: "In short, we recommend a shift in the burden of criminality from those who are the most marginalised and vulnerable – to those that create the demand in the first place."

In March 2012, Shuker was one of three MPs who signed a letter sent to the Advertising Standards Authority asking it to reverse its decision to stop the Christian group "Healing on the Streets of Bath" from making explicit claims that prayer can heal. The letter called for the ASA to provide indisputable scientific evidence that such healing did not work.

Shuker has been a critic of right-wing nationalist groups such as Britain First, the English Defence League (EDL) and Liberty GB, condemning what he calls their repeated "targeting" of Luton. He has drawn attention to the high costs of policing demonstrations by the EDL, and has spoken at rallies opposing the EDL's presence in Luton.

Following the May 2015 general election, Shuker announced his intention to support Liz Kendall's campaign to be Labour leader.

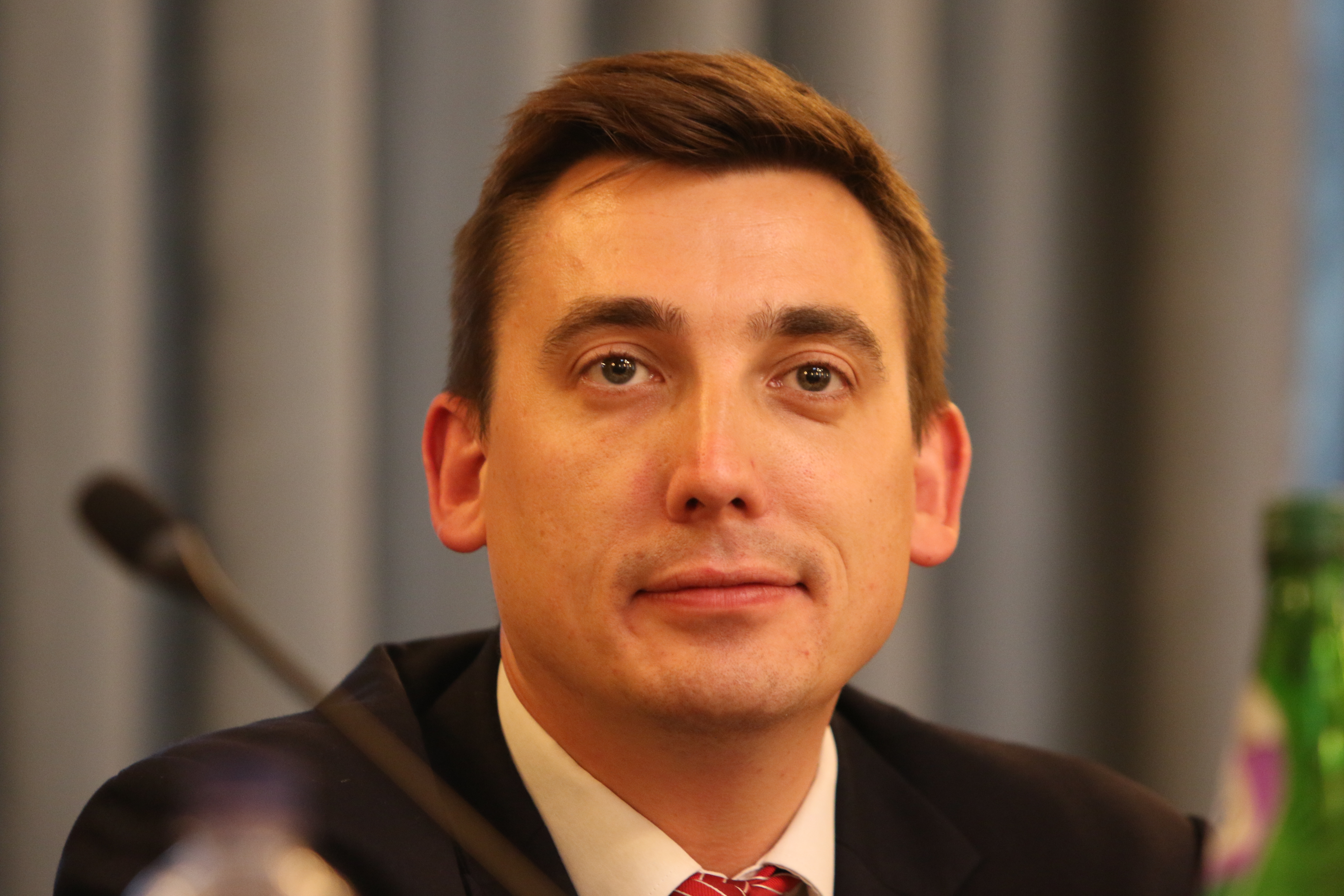
Shuker speaking at a summit on freedom of religion held at the Foreign & Commonwealth Office in London on October 19, 2016.

On 6 September 2018, a meeting of the Luton South Constituency Labour Party passed a vote of no confidence in Shuker. Luton South CLP passed their motion with 33 votes in favour of the motion with five abstentions and only three voting to support the MP. Following the vote, Shuker stated on Twitter: "At a local Labour Party meeting last night a motion of no confidence in me was passed. It's not part of any formal procedure, so it changes nothing about my role as Labour MP for Luton South".

=== The Independent Group and The Independents ===
On 18 February 2019, Shuker and six other MPs – Chuka Umunna, Chris Leslie, Angela Smith, Mike Gapes, Luciana Berger, and Ann Coffey – quit Labour in protest at Jeremy Corbyn's leadership to form the Independent Group of MPs. The Independent Group cited disagreements over the handling of Brexit and anti-Semitism within the Labour Party as key reasons for leaving.

In June 2019, he left Change UK (The Independent Group) to sit as an independent MP. In July 2019, Shuker was a founding member of a grouping of MPs called The Independents. He stood as an independent candidate in the 2019 United Kingdom general election, but lost his seat, polling 9.3% of the vote and coming third.

=== Political interests ===
His political interests include child poverty, student funding, transport policy, international development and debt reduction.

== Later career ==
In 2020 he became a director and chief executive officer of Cardeo Ltd, a UK based financial technology startup company. In June 2021 the company announced it had closed a £2.1m funding round to take its robo-advisor credit card app to market.

== Personal life ==
He was married to Lucie, whom he met at the University of Cambridge but announced in 2016 that they had divorced. They have a daughter, born 16 June 2013.

Parliament of the United Kingdom
Preceded by Margaret Moran	Member of Parliament for Luton South; 2010–2019	Succeeded by Rachel Hopkins
