= Anna Soubry =

British politician, barrister and journalist (born 1956)

The Right Honourable Anna Soubry PC
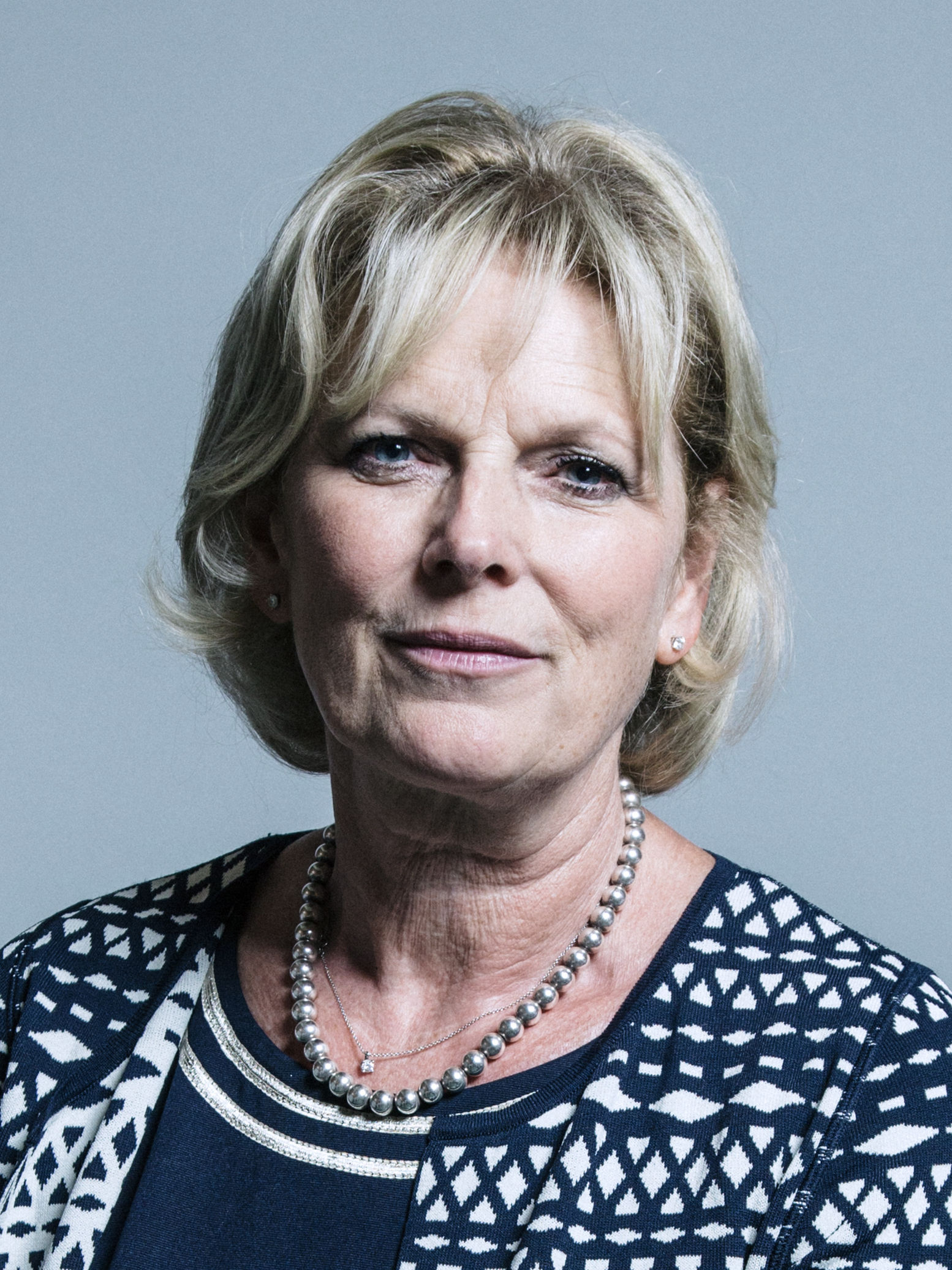
- Official portrait, 2017

Leader of the Independent Group for Change
- In office 4 June 2019 – 19 December 2019
- Preceded by: Heidi Allen (acting)
- Succeeded by: Office abolished (Note: On 19 December 2019 Soubry announced the dissolution of the party, which had lost all of its seats in the election that took place on 12 December.)

Minister of State for Small Business, Industry and Enterprise
- In office 11 May 2015 – 15 July 2016
- Prime Minister: David Cameron
- Preceded by: Matt Hancock; Jo Swinson
- Succeeded by: Margot James

Minister of State for Defence Personnel, Welfare and Veterans (Note: Parliamentary Under-Secretary of State (2013–14))
- In office 7 October 2013 – 11 May 2015
- Prime Minister: David Cameron
- Preceded by: Mark Francois
- Succeeded by: Mark Lancaster

Parliamentary Under-Secretary of State for Public Health
- In office 4 September 2012 – 7 October 2013
- Prime Minister: David Cameron
- Preceded by: Anne Milton
- Succeeded by: Jane Ellison

Member of Parliament for Broxtowe
- In office 6 May 2010 – 6 November 2019
- Preceded by: Nick Palmer
- Succeeded by: Darren Henry

Personal details
- Born: Anna Mary Soubry; 7 December 1956 (age 69) Lincoln, England
- Party: Independent (1981–1988; since 2019)
- Other political affiliations: Change UK (2019); Conservative (1975–1981; 1988–2019)
- Spouse(s): John Gordon (m. 1987, divorced) Richard Holloway (m. 1994, divorced)
- Domestic partner: Neil Davidson
- Children: 2 daughters
- Education: University of Birmingham (LLB); Inns of Court School of Law (BPTC)
- Other offices: March–June 2019: Change UK Spokesperson for Brexit and Justice

Anna Mary Soubry (/ˈsuːbri/; born 7 December 1956) is a British barrister, journalist and former politician who was Member of Parliament (MP) for Broxtowe from 2010 to 2019. Known for her support of pro-European policies, she was originally elected as a Conservative but left the party to join Change UK in 2019.

Born in Lincoln, Soubry was raised in Nottinghamshire and read law at the University of Birmingham. She was the sole Conservative Party member of the National Union of Students' executive committee while at university but left the Conservatives after graduating and endorsed the Social Democratic Party, although she did not join the new party. After working as a journalist and presenter in regional and network television, she was called to the bar in 1995 and began to practise as a criminal barrister.

Soubry unsuccessfully contested Gedling as a Conservative at the 2005 general election but, after being added to the Conservative A-List, was elected to represent Broxtowe at the subsequent general election in 2010. She was Parliamentary Under-Secretary of State for Public Health from 2012 to 2013 and Minister for Defence Personnel, Welfare and Veterans from 2013 to 2015. She was appointed Minister of State for Small Business, Industry and Enterprise following the 2015 general election, also attending meetings of the Cabinet, but she returned to the backbenches after Theresa May became Prime Minister in July 2016.

Having been a strong supporter of the United Kingdom remaining in the European Union during the 2016 referendum campaign, Soubry was a vocal critic of Brexit and the Conservative Party's facilitation of the policy. She resigned from the Conservatives in February 2019, citing her party's shift to the right and support of Brexit. She and others joined The Independent Group, later Change UK, and she was appointed its leader in June 2019. She lost her seat to Darren Henry of the Conservative Party in the 2019 general election, and Change UK disbanded shortly afterwards. Since 2022, Soubry has endorsed and supported the Labour Party.

== Early life ==
Her parents married in Worksop in 1955. Soubry was born at Lincoln County Hospital in Lincoln, Lincolnshire, where her mother Frances Soubry (née Coward) worked. Her father was David Soubry, a Nottinghamshire garage owner. Her mother was chairman of the local Retford Conservatives, and her father had also been part of the group. Her father played rugby for Retford.

She was brought up at St Oswald's House in Dunham-on-Trent and Hardwick Village from late 1964, near Clumber Park in Nottinghamshire. From 1982 her parents moved to Tuxford. Her mother worked with the Jubilee Sailing Trust, in the late 1980s.

Soubry attended the Dunham primary school, and the private Lorne House School, followed by Henry Hartland Grammar School from 1968 to 1970, in which year it became the Hartland Comprehensive; she remained at the school until 1975, in which year she joined the Conservative Party. She was involved in student politics in the 1970s, becoming the only Conservative member of the National Union of Students' executive committee. She graduated with a degree in law from the University of Birmingham in 1979.

Soubry left the Conservatives in 1981, alongside seven other former student leaders, who said at a press conference that the party remained "class based" and that the Social Democratic Party (SDP) was now the natural home of young people who "wish to see a prosperously united country". It was reported at the time that Soubry had joined the SDP, along with the others in the group, but in 2018 she denied having done so.

== Early career ==
Soubry was a journalist from 1981 until 1995. She reported on and presented several regional and networked TV programmes, including Central Television's Central Weekend, Grampian Television's North Tonight in the North of Scotland and the East Midlands regional news programme, Central News East. She also presented, reported and featured on Granada Television's This Morning in the late 1980s, and returned to Liverpool's Albert Dock in October 2013 for the This Morning 25th-anniversary party. Soubry was called to the Bar in 1995, and is a member of the Criminal Bar Association.

She was the Conservative Party candidate for the Gedling constituency in Nottinghamshire at the 2005 general election. During the campaign she said she was "ashamed" of living in Nottingham because it had a bad reputation for crime. She stated she was not ashamed of the people of Nottingham, but was ashamed of what had happened to the city.

Soubry was chosen as an "A-List candidate", and in 2006 was selected as Conservative candidate for the nearby Broxtowe constituency. During a debate in front of sixth formers in 2006, she said an honest debate was needed to stop people taking Class A drugs, and that she supported the legalisation of cannabis.

== Parliamentary career ==
Soubry was elected to Parliament at the 2010 general election. She was considered "one of the most formidable communicators of the new intake" by Nicholas Watt of The Guardian, but not a Thatcherite. In June 2010, Soubry was elected as a Conservative member of the Justice Select Committee.

Soubry sponsored a private member's bill in June 2010 to provide anonymity to a person who has been arrested but not charged. The second reading took place in February 2011. Soubry withdrew the bill after its second reading, when Justice Minister Crispin Blunt promised the Attorney General would examine the area of concern.

Soubry was a strong supporter of same-sex marriage in 2013 and voted in favour of it at every opportunity.

In February 2016, Soubry spoke in favour of fracking.

In November 2016, Soubry joined the Scottish Affairs Committee. At the 2017 general election Soubry retained her seat with a reduced majority on a record turnout of 75%, despite receiving the highest percentage share and number of votes for a Conservative Party candidate in Broxtowe since the 1992 election. In the 2019 general election, standing for the Independent Group for Change, Soubry polled 4,668 votes (8%) and finished 3rd thereby losing her seat to the Conservative Party candidate, Darren Henry, who polled 26,602 votes.

=== Constituency issues ===
==== Tram system ====
In June 2010, Soubry met the transport minister Norman Baker and called for the £400,000,000 extension to the Nottingham Express Transit tram system to be scrapped, saying the money would be better spent on the A453 road. David Thornhill of the Campaign for Better Transport expressed astonishment at her opinion, and said the tram was definitely better value for money. Soubry said she was pro-tram, but that the tram route through her constituency was "fundamentally flawed". The extension nevertheless was constructed as planned.

In July 2013, Soubry criticised Nottingham City Council leader Jon Collins over his refusal to meet her and others to discuss compensation for shops and businesses in the constituency which faced closure due to the tram works. Collins subsequently agreed to meet her, and the outcome was a review into the compensation packages available for affected businesses.

==== Royal Mail privatisation ====
In October 2010, Soubry wrote in her monthly column in the Beeston Express that on returning to Parliament she met a "somewhat shell-shocked Parliamentary Assistant bearing a pile of some 300 cards from constituents urging me to oppose the proposed sell-off of the Royal Mail."

She expressed dismay at the time and cost of replying to each constituent when she had already discussed the issue with the Communication Workers' Union (CWU). Twelve days later, Soubry announced in the House of Commons that of the 700 postal workers in her constituency, to her knowledge, none had written to her opposing privatisation of Royal Mail and only two had come to London.

After complaints from the CWU, Soubry agreed she was wrong, but said that some of the letters had been misfiled and others had arrived late or were sent to the wrong MP, and that the CWU had been inefficient. She claimed she genuinely believed she was telling the truth, that the bill protected Royal Mail, its workers and the universal postal service, and said that was the only reason she supported it.

==== Support for Citizens' Advice Bureau ====
In November 2010, Soubry appeared on the East Midlands version of The Politics Show to discuss her efforts to help the Citizens' Advice Bureau. The programme reviewed the current state of Nottinghamshire's CAB which was facing a 30% increase in enquiries plus cuts in its budget from local councils and the Ministry of Justice. Soubry said she had asked the leader of Nottingham County Council and Kenneth Clarke to reconsider. Soubry later organised a meeting between the CAB, Midlands Women's Aid and charities minister Nick Hurd to make him aware of the effects of the proposed cuts in funding to these organisations.

==== HS2 (High Speed Rail) ====
In January 2013, Soubry welcomed the announcement of the proposed High Speed 2 East Midlands Hub station at Toton Sidings in the constituency, stating that it was "a very good news day for Broxtowe". She has held a number of public meetings on the issue.

Soubry voiced criticism in August 2013 over plans to not hold a public consultation meeting in the constituency, calling on HS2 Ltd to hold an event in Toton where the proposed East Midlands Hub is to be built.

=== National issues ===
==== Support for NHS reforms ====
In an interview on the Daily Politics show in February 2012, Soubry as public health minister defended the NHS reforms.

In March 2012, a group of 240 doctors wrote to The Independent describing the reforms as an "embarrassment to democracy" which had no support from professional healthcare organisations. They pledged to stand as candidates against MPs who backed them and Soubry was mentioned as a likely target. In response Soubry stated there had been no complaints from her local GP consortium and claimed that many local GPs could not wait for the Bill to be passed.

==== Smoking ====
In a Westminster Hall debate, Soubry emphasised the role advertising plays in encouraging young people to smoke. She herself took up smoking as a teenager because of the attractive packaging and she compared addiction to nicotine to heroin dependence; though she had no direct experience of the latter. According to The Daily Telegraph, her comments raised questions about why the Coalition dropped plans for plain packaging shortly after David Cameron employed Lynton Crosby, who has worked for tobacco companies, as an election strategist.

=== Ministerial career ===
Following her appointment as Parliamentary Under-Secretary of State for Public Health in September 2012, Soubry gave an interview with The Times in which she stated her support for assisted suicide for terminally ill people. Both the Department of Health and the Ministry of Justice denied there were plans for reform, though her Liberal Democrat colleague Norman Lamb welcomed discussion and said he expected a private members' bill to be introduced by Lord Falconer in 2013. Assisting suicide currently carries a maximum 14-year prison sentence.

On 14 September 2012, speaking at an NHS Leadership Academy conference, Soubry stated that the Coalition had "screwed up" in the way it dealt with the medical profession over the NHS reforms. Soubry later said that she fully supported the reforms but believed the benefits to patients could have been better explained and this would have won more support from health professionals.

As Public Health Minister, Soubry criticised retailers who forced customers to pass "rows of unhealthy foods" on their way to the checkout and said that a new code of practice would urge retailers to stop this and also reduce deals on unhealthy food.

In August 2013, as Public Health Minister, Soubry supported plans for a change in the law to allow HIV home-testing kits.

Soubry was appointed Parliamentary Under-Secretary of State for Defence in David Cameron's October 2013 reshuffle, becoming the first elected female politician to be a Minister in the MoD. In the July 2014 reshuffle, Soubry was appointed Minister of State for Defence Personnel, Welfare and Veterans.

Following the 2015 general election, Soubry became Minister of State for Small Business, Industry and Enterprise at the Department for Business, Innovation and Skills until 15 July 2016. Her partner, Neil Davidson, is a director at Morrisons leading her opponents to note a potential conflict of interest when she introduced new Sunday trading laws. During an interview with ITV's Paul Brand, Soubry revealed that Theresa May offered her a position as Minister of State for Justice in the formation of her first ministry in 2016 - though Soubry rejected this offer, preferring to return to the backbenches.

Soubry was appointed to the Privy Council in May 2015.

=== European Union ===
==== EU withdrawal referendum ====
Soubry was a strong supporter of Britain remaining in the European Union, and backed the "Remain" campaign during the 2016 EU membership referendum, the holding of which she supported.

In September 2016, Soubry criticised members of Vote Leave when it became clear that the pledge "at the heart ... of their message" of £350,000,000 a week of extra funding for the NHS was being dropped from post-Brexit plans. Following a leaked Treasury report which claimed that the estimated annual cost to the UK Treasury of a "hard Brexit" would be between £38bn and £66bn per year after 15 years, Soubry referenced the loss of money for schools and hospitals and stated that Parliament should be involved in the principles guiding Brexit negotiations.

==== Following the referendum ====
Following the referendum, in which Broxtowe had a 54.6% vote to leave, Soubry criticised former Mayor of London Boris Johnson, who led the "Leave" campaign, accusing him of backing Britain's exit from the EU because he wanted to be Prime Minister: "My anger with Boris is that I don't honestly believe that he believed what he was saying to people". Appearing as a guest on BBC One's Question Time in June 2016, Soubry warned that some people who voted to leave the EU had disregarded tolerance, and describing it as "[not] our country's finest hour". She urged the UK to put "hope over hatred" following the result.

In February 2017, Soubry voted to invoke Article 50 of the Treaty on European Union, triggering the process of withdrawal from the EU, saying: "I said I will honour the result of the referendum, so I voted to trigger article 50. So, I accept we are leaving the European Union, even though the result was close. My argument now is how do we get the best deal, and I want parliament, finally, to be involved in getting the best deal for our country." In parliamentary debate over the European Union (Notification of Withdrawal) Bill, Soubry said: "I did not vote with my conscience, and if I am truthful about it, I am not sure that I voted in the best interests of my constituents. ... However, I was true to the promise that I had made to my constituents. I had promised them that if they voted leave, they would get leave, and that is what drove me through the Lobbies last week with a heavy heart and against my conscience."

Addressing a Brexit protest outside Parliament in June 2016 she described how her 84-year-old mother, and her daughters, had "wept" on the morning that the result was announced. In an emotional and impromptu speech she told the gathering "We made a terrible, terrible mistake on Friday" and urged those wanting to stay in the European Union to continue fighting for that cause.

In December 2017, Soubry was one of 11 Conservative rebels who voted in favour of Parliament being guaranteed a vote on the final Brexit deal, despite the government's reluctance, with enough Conservatives rebelling that the measure was forced through.

In January 2018, Soubry said the government should not let the 35 MPs she described as "hard Brexiteers" dictate the terms of Brexit. On 15 April 2018, Soubry attended the launch event of the People's Vote, a campaign group calling for a public vote on the final Brexit deal between the UK and the European Union. Later that year, Soubry declared that there should be a national government to solve the issue of Brexit and went on to argue that members of the European Research Group should be expelled from the Conservative Party. In December 2018, she declared that she would resign the Conservative whip and vote to have no confidence in her government if 'no deal' became the policy of the government.

In December 2018, Soubry was harassed by a group of protesters in Westminster she described as "far-right". They referred to her as "on the side of Adolf Hitler" and called her a traitor for her anti-Brexit stance. This was met with condemnation from MPs of all sides of the political spectrum, and by the Speaker of the House of Commons, John Bercow. In February 2019, James Goddard, one of the activists who accosted Soubry, was charged with harassment in connection with the incident in December 2018 and a separate incident outside Parliament in January 2019.

In early 2019, Soubry co-founded the group Right to Vote.

=== The Independent Group ===
Soubry resigned from the Conservative Party on 20 February 2019, along with Heidi Allen and Sarah Wollaston, and joined The Independent Group, later Change UK. Soubry stated that "the right wing, the hard-line anti-EU awkward squad" had hijacked the Conservative Party from top to toe.

On 4 June 2019, Change UK announced Soubry as their leader after six of the 11 MPs left to sit as independents and Heidi Allen resigned as leader. Soubry commented that she was "deeply disappointed" at the split.

Following the new party's failure to win at the December 2019 general election, in which it polled a total of 10,006 votes, Soubry announced that the Independent Group for Change would be disbanded. All three of the party's MPs who sought re-election were defeated with Soubry coming "a distant third in Broxtowe". Soubry stated that while there was "a need for massive change in British politics," without representation in parliament "a longer-term realignment will have to take place in a different way".

== Post-parliamentary career ==
In October 2021, Soubry rejoined her old chambers KCH Garden Square and returned to the Criminal Bar.

At the 2024 general election, Soubry publicly supported the Labour Party candidate Juliet Campbell at the Broxtowe constituency. She also gave public support to Keir Starmer and his leadership of the Labour Party, although not a member of the party herself.

== Personal life ==
Soubry has been married twice, and is a mother of two daughters by her marriage to John Gordon. She has been reported to be in a relationship with Neil Davidson, a non-executive director of Morrisons supermarket.

== Notes ==
Parliament of the United Kingdom
Preceded by Nick Palmer	Member of Parliament for Broxtowe; 2010–2019	Succeeded by Darren Henry
Political offices
Preceded by Matt Hancock as Minister of State for Business and Enterprise	Minister of State for Small Business, Industry and Enterprise; 2015–2016	Succeeded by Margot James as Minister for Small Business, Consumers and Corporate Responsibility
