= Ann Coffey =

British politician (born 1946)

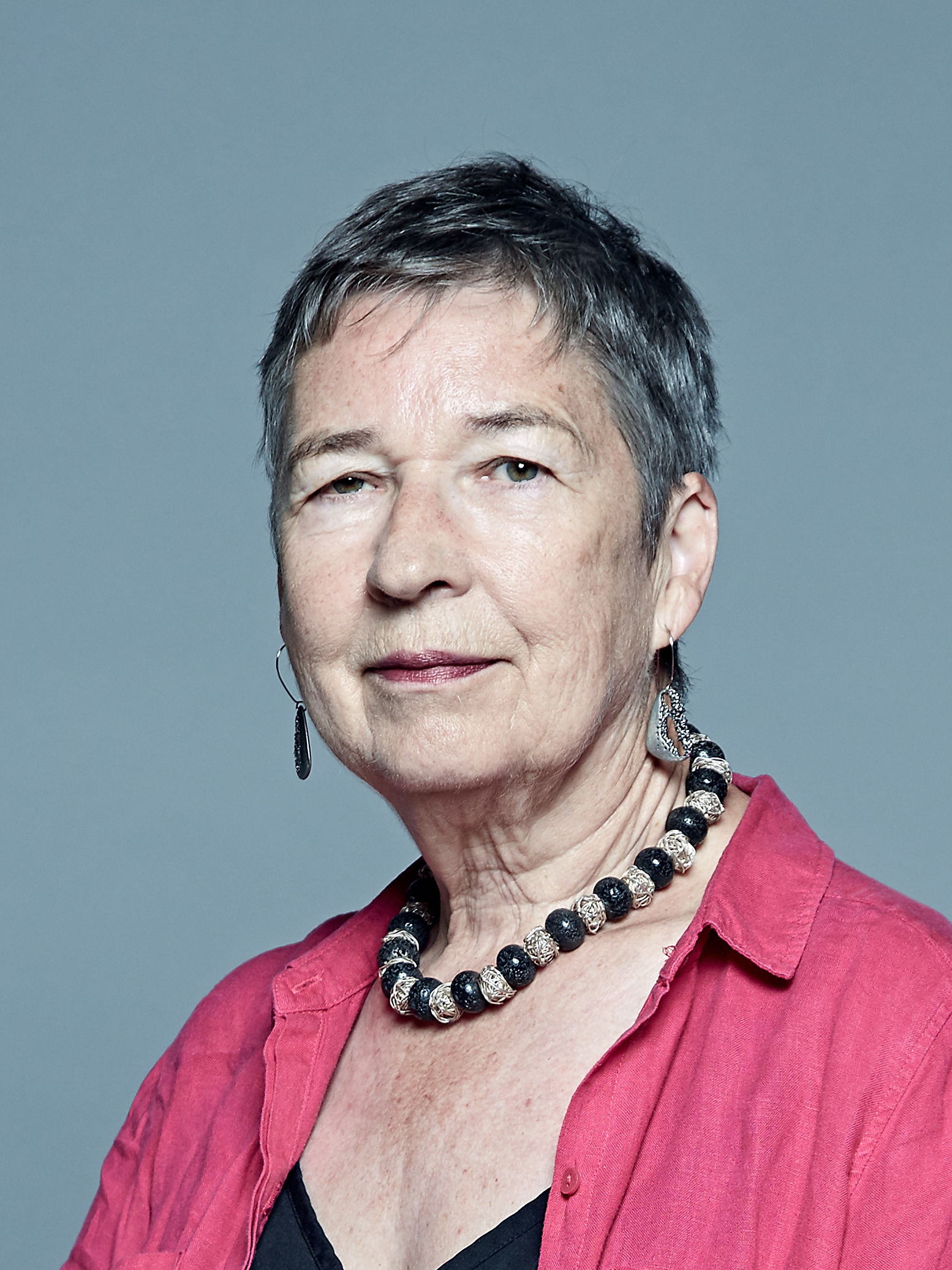
- Official portrait, 2018

Parliamentary Private Secretary to the Chancellor of the Exchequer
- In office 28 June 2007 – 11 May 2010
- Prime Minister: Gordon Brown
- Chancellor: Alistair Darling
- Preceded by: Ann Keen
- Succeeded by: Greg Hands

Parliamentary Private Secretary to the Prime Minister
- In office 2 May 1997 – 28 July 1998 Serving with Bruce Grocott
- Prime Minister: Tony Blair
- Preceded by: John Ward
- Succeeded by: Bruce Grocott

Member of Parliament for Stockport
- In office 9 April 1992 – 6 November 2019
- Preceded by: Anthony Favell
- Succeeded by: Navendu Mishra

Personal details
- Born: Margaret Ann Brown; 31 August 1946 (age 79) Inverness, Scotland
- Party: Independent (since 2019)
- Other political affiliations: Change UK (2019); Labour (before 2019)
- Spouses: Thomas Coffey (m. 1973; div. 1989) Peter Saraga (m. 1998; his death 2023)
- Children: 1
- Education: Borough Polytechnic Institute (BSc); Walsall College (PGCE); University of Manchester (MSc)
- Occupation: Politician
- Other offices: March–June 2019: Change UK Spokesperson for Children and Education

Margaret Ann Coffey (née Brown; born 31 August 1946) is a British former politician who was Member of Parliament (MP) for Stockport from 1992 to 2019. A former member of the Labour Party, she defected to form Change UK.

Coffey resigned from the Labour Party in 2019 in protest at the leadership of Jeremy Corbyn and, with six others, formed Change UK.

== Early life and education ==
Born as Margaret Ann Brown to a Royal Air Force officer, in Inverness, she attended Nairn Academy, Bodmin County Grammar School (which closed in 1973), Bushey Grammar School and the Borough Polytechnic Institute in London, where she was awarded a Bachelor of Science degree in Sociology in 1969, and was elected vice president of the students' union.

Coffey attended Walsall College of Education where she was awarded a Postgraduate Certificate in Education (PGCE) in 1971 and qualified as a teacher, and the University of Manchester where she completed her Master of Science in psychiatric social work at the School of Medicine.

== Career ==
Coffey began her career as a trainee social worker with Walsall Social Services in 1971. In 1972, she became a social worker at Birmingham City Council, moving to Gwynedd County Council in 1973 and the Metropolitan Borough of Wolverhampton in 1974. From there, she went to the Metropolitan Borough of Stockport in 1975, before moving once more in 1982 to Cheshire County Council. In 1988, she became the fostering team leader for the Metropolitan Borough of Oldham until her election to parliament.

=== Labour Party ===
Coffey was elected as a councillor to Stockport Metropolitan Borough Council in 1984 and was its Labour group leader 1988–92, stepping down from the council in 1992. She contested the parliamentary seat of Cheadle at the 1987 General Election, and finished in third place, some 25,000 votes behind the sitting Conservative MP Stephen Day. She was selected to contest the Conservative-held marginal Stockport constituency at the 1992 General Election; she defeated the sitting Conservative MP Tony Favell by 1,422 votes and has remained the MP for the seat since then. She made her maiden speech on 12 May 1992.

In her first term in Parliament, Coffey served initially as a member of the trade and industry select committee, until she was promoted by Tony Blair to become an Opposition whip in 1995, and Opposition health spokeswoman in 1996.

When Labour won the 1997 General Election, Coffey was appointed as Parliamentary Private Secretary (PPS) to the Prime Minister Tony Blair. In 1998, she became PPS to the Secretary of State for Work and Pensions Alistair Darling and was his assistant from 2002 to 2006 in his capacity as the Secretary of State for Transport and thereafter as Secretary of State for Trade and Industry.

Following the resignation of Tony Blair as Prime Minister on 27 June 2007, Coffey became Parliamentary Private Secretary to the Chancellor of the Exchequer, Alistair Darling.

During the expenses scandal of 2009, it was revealed that Coffey claimed £1,000 per month for the interest on the mortgage of her London home and £160 per month for a cleaner. In addition to her salary of £60,000 in 2007 she claimed £150,000 for staff salaries and office costs plus reimbursable expenses.

Coffey was the chair of the All Party Parliamentary Group for Runaway and Missing Children and Adults. In October 2014, Coffey published a report, Real Voices – Child sexual exploitation in Greater Manchester, commissioned by the Greater Manchester Police and Crime Commissioner in the wake of the Rochdale child sexual abuse scandal, which included interviews with children and made 43 recommendations.

After the report, Coffey launched a successful campaign to banish all references to "child prostitution" from UK legislation. She tabled a series of amendments to the Serious Crime Bill in 2015 to remove all references to child prostitution. She received support from all parties and eventually the government agreed to her proposal and tabled an amendment to substitute all references to child prostitution with child sexual exploitation.

In 2015, Coffey was criticised over voting for airstrikes against Syria.

In 2017, Coffey wrote a follow-up report, Real Voices – Are they being heard?, which looked at improvements made by the police and other agencies in tackling child sexual exploitation since 2014. The report noted that training and awareness amongst the police and the public had led to significant increases in reporting offences, identification of victims and offenders and intelligence tip-offs.

As chair of the APPG, Coffey has chaired a number parliamentary inquiries including one in June 2012 on the risks faced by children missing from home and care, and another in May 2016 looking into the safeguarding of absent children.

Coffey went on to conduct a high-profile campaign against the criminal exploitation of children. She maintained that the grooming process for criminal exploitation was very similar to that used for sexual exploitation of children.

The APPG published a report in July 2017 on children who go missing and are exploited by gangs to sell drugs. Coffey particularly focused on the use of vulnerable children and young people in County Lines drugs operations, whereby children are groomed by criminals and forced to transport and supply drugs from one area to another.

In January 2018, Coffey conducted an independent survey of all 45 police forces asking if there had been an increase in violence connected to County Lines. Coffey campaigned for the children used and trapped in County Lines to be seen as victims, not criminals and for early interventions by agencies to prevent them becoming embedded in gangs. She also called for more use of the human trafficking and slavery laws, which carry heavy penalties against gangs who use children as drug mules.

Together with Margaret Hodge, she submitted a letter to the Parliamentary Labour Party chairman requesting a vote on a motion of no confidence in the party leader Jeremy Corbyn on 25 June 2016, two days after Britain voted to leave the European Union.

In November 2018, Coffey called for an inquiry into the use of juries in rape cases. She also penned opinion pieces in which she suggested juries may be scrapped and replaced in such cases, due to the existence of "rape myths" amongst jurors.

=== Change UK ===
On 18 February 2019, Coffey left the Labour Party in protest at Jeremy Corbyn's policies on Brexit and what she described as Labour's failure to deal with antisemitism, and joined The Independent Group, before leaving parliament in the 2019 general election, having announced her departure on Twitter.

== Personal life ==
She married Thomas Coffey in 1973 in Pontefract and they have a daughter. They divorced in 1989 and she has since remarried to Peter Saraga, vice-chair of the University of Sussex's University Council and a former managing director at Philips Research Labs UK. Coffey resides in Heaton Moor, Stockport.

Parliament of the United Kingdom
Preceded by Anthony Favell	Member of Parliament for Stockport; 1992–2019	Succeeded by Nav Mishra
