= Change UK =

British centrist political party in 2019

Independent Group for Change
- Leader: Anna Soubry (4 June – 19 December 2019); Heidi Allen (acting) (29 March – 4 June 2019)
- Founded: 18 February 2019; 7 years ago
- Registered: 15 April 2019; 7 years ago
- Dissolved: 19 December 2019; 6 years ago
- Split from: Labour Party; Conservative Party
- Headquarters: 521 Terminal House; 52 Grosvenor Gardens; London; SW1W 0AU
- Ideology: Centrism Pro-Europeanism
- Political position: Centre
- European affiliation: European People's Party
- European Parliament group: European People's Party Group
- Colours: Black White
- Slogan: Politics is broken. Let's change it.
- Seats prior to 2019 general election: 5 / 650

Change UK, founded as The Independent Group (TIG) and later The Independent Group for Change, was a centrist, pro–European Union political party in the United Kingdom, which existed for ten months during 2019. Established in February and formally recognised as a party in May, it was dissolved in December after all its MPs lost their seats at that year's general election. Its principal aim was a second withdrawal referendum on European Union membership, in which it would campaign to remain in the EU. On economic issues it expressed a commitment to the social market economy.

The party originated when seven MPs resigned from the Labour Party to sit as The Independent Group. They were dissatisfied by Labour's leftward political direction under Jeremy Corbyn's leadership, its approach to Brexit and its handling of allegations of antisemitism within the party. They were soon joined by four more MPs, including three from the governing Conservative Party who disliked their party's approach to Brexit and its move rightward. The group registered as a political party under the name Change UK – The Independent Group and appointed former Conservative MP Heidi Allen as their leader before May's European Parliament election.

Following the party's failure to secure any seats in that election, six of its eleven MPs, including Allen, left the party and Anna Soubry took over as leader. Four of the six formed The Independents grouping and two defected to the Liberal Democrats. Later, three of The Independents also joined the Liberal Democrats. In June the party adopted the name The Independent Group for Change following a legal dispute with petition website Change.org. Three of the party's MPs stood for re-election in December's general election. None were re-elected, each losing to a candidate from their former parties. On 19 December, Soubry announced the party's dissolution.

== History ==
=== Formation ===
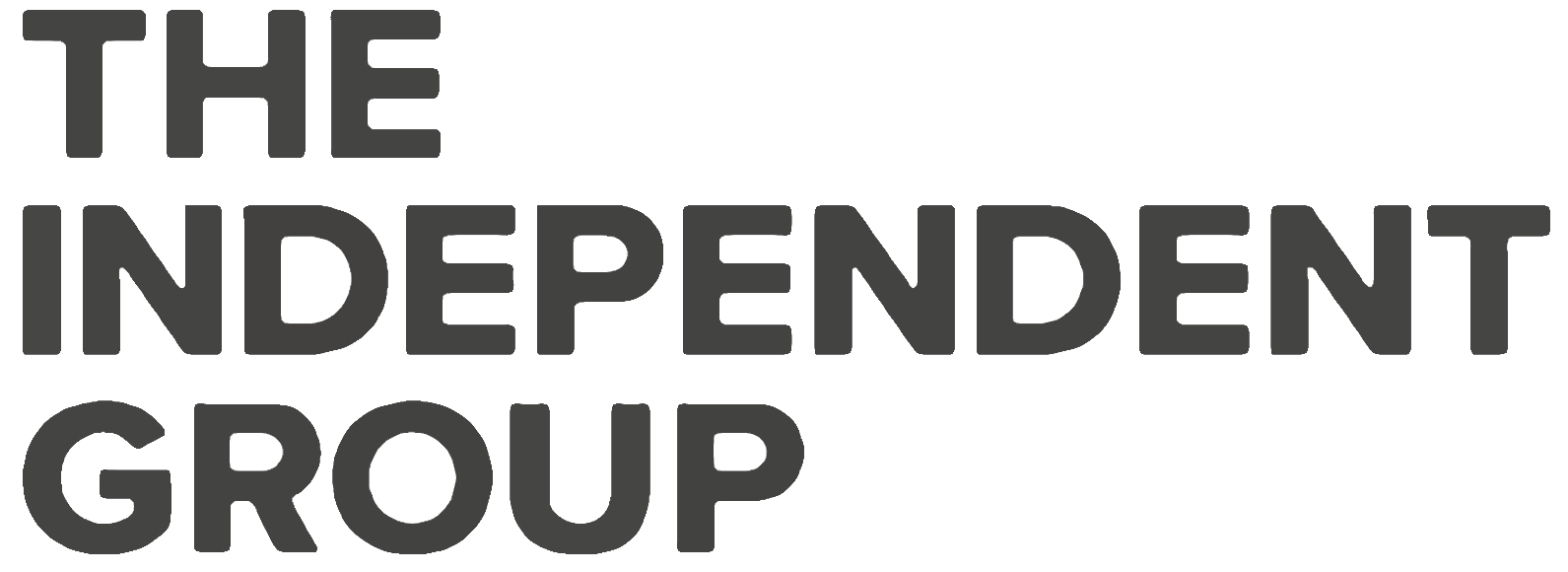
Logo of The Independent Group, February–April 2019

The group was founded by MPs Luciana Berger, Ann Coffey, Mike Gapes, Chris Leslie, Gavin Shuker, Angela Smith and Chuka Umunna, after they announced their resignations from the opposition Labour Party on 18 February 2019. Rather than forming a party, they referred to themselves as The Independent Group (TIG). Leslie, Shuker and Smith had previously lost no-confidence motions brought by their Constituency Labour Parties. Berger had had two brought against her, both withdrawn. Ian Murray planned to resign alongside the others but pulled out shortly before the launch.

The media compared TIG to the Gang of Four who split from Labour to found the Social Democratic Party (today the centrist Liberal Democrats) in 1981. Four of the seven founding members (Berger, Gapes, Shuker and Leslie) had been Labour and Co-operative Party MPs; they left both parties. Announcing the resignations, Berger described Labour as having become "institutionally antisemitic", while Leslie said Labour had been "hijacked by the machine politics of the hard left" and Gapes said he was "furious that the Labour leadership is complicit in facilitating Brexit".

On the day TIG launched, Smith appeared on the BBC's Politics Live programme, where she said, in a discussion about racism, that: "The recent history of the party I've just left suggested it's not just about being black or a funny tin... you know, a different... from the BAME community". The offending phrase was partially uttered, but it was widely reported to be "funny tinge". Smith apologised shortly afterwards, saying, "I'm very upset that I misspoke so badly." Commentators noted an irony, given the fact that the group had been formed in response to perceived racism.

The following day, Joan Ryan, who had the previous September lost a vote of no-confidence brought by her constituency party, announced her departure from Labour, becoming the first MP to join after TIG's formation. The day after that, three MPs left the governing Conservative Party to join. Sarah Wollaston, Heidi Allen and Anna Soubry cited the handling of Brexit by the Prime Minister (including "red lines" which alienated most Remainers); the party's reliance on the European Research Group (which supported a no-deal Brexit) and the Democratic Unionist Party (DUP) in passing Brexit-related legislation; what they saw as the takeover of the party by "right wing, ... hard-line anti-EU" MPs and its lack of concern for the "most vulnerable in society", as reasons for their departure.

Umunna rejected the notion of any merger with the Lib Dems. Soubry called on one-nation Conservatives and "like-minded Lib Dems" to join TIG. A few former Conservative and Labour parliamentarians publicly switched allegiance, while some Labour local councillors in England left the party for TIG.

=== Registration as a political party ===
Logos of Change UK – The Independent Group

Logo of Change UK – The Independent Group, April 2019

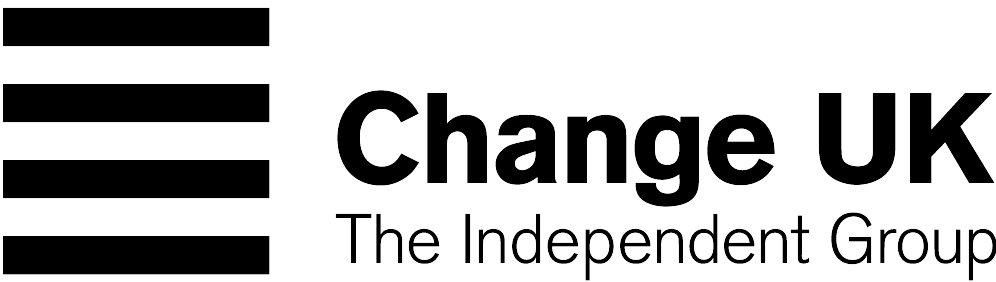
Logo of Change UK – The Independent Group, April–July 2019

In March, the group announced that it had applied to the Electoral Commission to register as a political party under the name "Change UK – The Independent Group", in order to be able to stand candidates if the UK participated in May's European elections. Heidi Allen was appointed interim leader, pending an inaugural party conference planned for September.

The registration was confirmed by the Electoral Commission in April. The party's proposed emblem, however, was rejected by the Commission, both for inclusion of the TIG acronym, which they considered insufficiently well-known, and for use of a hashtag.

In April, the centrist Renew Party, which had formed in 2017 but not won any seats, announced it would be supporting Change UK – The Independent Group in the European elections. Change UK welcomed the move and said it would accept applications from Renew-approved candidates to stand for Change UK.

=== European Parliament election ===
MEPs Julie Girling and Richard Ashworth joined Change UK in April. Both had been elected as Conservatives, but were suspended from the party after supporting a motion in the European Parliament saying sufficient progress had not been made in Brexit negotiations to allow trade talks to start.

In May, Girling decided not to stand and encouraged Remain supporters in the South West to vote for the Lib Dems, saying they were "clearly the lead Remain party" in the region. Both Girling and Change UK later said that she had never been a member or one of their MEPs.

Change UK announced on 23 April that it would stand a full slate of candidates in Great Britain for the European elections, including Ashworth, writer Rachel Johnson (sister of Conservative MPs Jo and Boris Johnson), former BBC journalist Gavin Esler, former Conservative MPs Stephen Dorrell and Neil Carmichael, former Labour MEP Carole Tongue, former Labour MPs Roger Casale and Jon Owen Jones, former Liberal Democrat MEP Diana Wallis, and Jacek Rostowski, the former deputy Prime Minister of Poland.

Within a day, controversial tweets, some allegedly racist, by two Change UK candidates – including the top one for the Scottish constituency – were discovered, leading those candidates to withdraw. The Muslim Council of Great Britain and anti-racism charity Tell MAMA condemned the selection of a third candidate, Nora Mulready, who they said had conflated Islam with terrorism and legitimised the far right; this was dismissed by Mulready and Change UK as a "smear campaign". Prominent LGBT journalists condemned the selection of Rostowski for his anti-gay marriage stance, although he was believed to have recanted homophobic remarks made in 2011 and 2013 about same-sex relationships.

In mid-May, David MacDonald, who had earlier replaced Joseph Russo as Change UK's lead candidate in Scotland following the controversy over the latter's tweets, defected from the party and encouraged supporters to vote for the Scottish Liberal Democrats. In an interview with The Times, the lead candidate in South West England, Rachel Johnson, described the party as a "sinking ship", criticised the leadership structure and said that Change UK was a "terrible" name.

A week later, interim leader Heidi Allen suggested that the party might not exist at the next general election and hinted at the formation of an alliance with the Liberal Democrats. On 22 May, she said that she and Wollaston had wanted to advise Remain supporters to vote tactically for the Liberal Democrats in the European elections outside of London and South East England, but were overruled by other members. Allen said she threatened to resign as leader over the issue of whether to endorse the Liberal Democrats in some regions. She denied her party was in disarray.

Between the European Parliament polling day and the count, with the Liberal Democrats expected to have done much better in the vote than Change UK, Umunna said that he thought a pact between Change UK and the Liberal Democrats at the next election "would be sensible". Allen then said she would go "one step further" and implied she wanted a merger with the Liberal Democrats. However, Soubry criticised Allen's tactical voting comments and the idea of any imminent alliance with the Liberal Democrats, describing talk of an alliance as being "a long way down the line".

Change UK won no seats in the European elections, garnering 3.3% of the vote overall. Their highest vote was 5.3% in London. They were closest to winning a seat in the South East England constituency where they got 4.2%, 3.1% away from a seat. An internal party report was supposedly critical of some MPs for supposedly talking down the party's prospects.

=== Resignations ===
After a June meeting of the party's MPs, described as "amicable" by the Financial Times but "fraught" by the New Statesman, six of the party's MPs – Berger, Shuker, Smith, Umunna, Wollaston and interim party leader Allen – announced their resignation from the party. The other five MPs remained in the party, with Brexit and Justice spokeswoman Anna Soubry becoming leader.

In an article shortly before the announcement of the resignations, Stephen Bush of the New Statesman described three viewpoints in the party: one group favouring merger with the Liberal Democrats, including Allen and Umunna; another ideologically unsympathetic towards the Liberal Democrats, including Gapes, Leslie, Ryan and Soubry; and a third who supported reverting to being a loose collection of independents which could attract Labour and Conservative defectors who would find it difficult to switch to a rival party. Shuker was later described as in the last group. The Financial Times described a longstanding split between Umunna and Leslie, both of whom had vied to be the leading force within the party, with Allen chosen as interim leader to defuse tensions.

In an interview that evening, Soubry said that those leaving wanted Change UK to become a "movement" that did not field candidates. The New Statesman commented that most of the MPs with links to donors had left, and the party was not financially secure.

Rumours continued that some, but not all, of those who left the party would eventually join the Liberal Democrats, with the New Statesman suggesting that Umunna, Wollaston and Allen were best placed to be able to win re-election as Liberal Democrats. Umunna joined the Liberal Democrats in June. The following month, Berger, Shuker, Smith and Allen along with John Woodcock formed a non-party group called The Independents. By the time of the election, Berger, Smith and Allen had left this grouping to join the Lib Dems.

=== Naming dispute with Change.org and name change ===
Logo of The Independent Group for Change, July 2019 until dissolution

At the time of the party's registration, the petitions website Change.org announced that it would challenge the branding as having "hijacked" its identity. Shortly after announcing themselves as Change UK, Soubry accidentally called the party "Change.org" in Parliament. Threats of litigation resulted in the party applying to the Electoral Commission to change its name to The Independent Group for Change, a request granted the next month.

=== 2019 general election and deregistration ===
Before the general election in December, the party announced it would only contest Broxtowe, Ilford South and Nottingham East, where Soubry, Gapes and Leslie, respectively, sought re-election. Coffey and Ryan did not stand for re-election. The Liberal Democrats announced that they would not stand against Soubry in Broxtowe.

All three candidates lost their seats: Soubry and Gapes came third in their races, while Leslie was fourth. Soubry had the highest vote share at 8.5%. Of its six former members, Allen did not stand in the election, Shuker stood as an independent candidate and the other four stood for the Liberal Democrats. All of those lost their seats as well, with Berger performing best, coming second with 31.9%, standing in a different constituency, Finchley and Golders Green.

Soubry announced a week after the election that the management council had agreed to deregister with the Electoral Commission and begin the process of closing down the Independent Group for Change. The party tweeted: "It was right to shine a spotlight on Britain's broken politics. But having taken stock and with no voice now in parliament, we begin the process of winding up our party. Thanks to all who stood with us." The party was formally deregistered by the Electoral Commission on 23 July 2020.

== Reactions ==
=== Labour Party ===
At the time TIG was formed, Labour leader Jeremy Corbyn responded that he was "disappointed" by the actions of the MPs leaving Labour. Labour Shadow Chancellor John McDonnell said that TIG MPs had a "responsibility" to resign and fight by-elections, as they had been elected as Labour MPs and should seek the approval of the electorate for their new platform. Other Labour Party figures stressed reflection, with deputy leader Tom Watson imploring his party to change in order to stave off further defections. Jon Lansman, the founder of Momentum, said he had "personal sympathy" for Berger because of the "hate and abuse" she had suffered. However, the six other former Labour MPs were, in his opinion, malcontents opposed to Corbyn's leadership.

Labour MP Ruth George, who had been asked to respond to a Facebook comment suggesting the group's financial backers were "Israelis", replied that "Support from the State of Israel, which supports both Conservative and Labour Friends of Israel of which Luciana was chair is possible and I would not condemn those who suggest it, especially when the group's financial backers are not being revealed". After Jewish groups said that she was indulging an antisemitic conspiracy theory, she apologised and withdrew her comment.

A week after TIG was formed, Labour announced that it would back moves for a second EU referendum in the coming weeks, a move interpreted as partially a response to the threat of further defections.

In March, MPs passed a motion put forward by Labour to remove Gapes, as well as non-TIG independent Ian Austin, from their seats on the Foreign Affairs Select Committee they held as part of the Labour Party's allocation. They were replaced by Labour MPs Conor McGinn and Catherine West. Gapes called the move "a sad day for the independence of Select Committees", while Labour said that it was right that the party filled its allocation of seats on the committees.

=== Conservative Party ===
After Soubry, Wollaston and Allen joined TIG, Prime Minister and Conservative leader Theresa May stated that she was "saddened" by their departure. Her predecessor, David Cameron, said he respected their decision but disagreed with it, as the party needs "strong voices at every level of the party calling for the modern, compassionate Conservatism that saw the Conservative Party return to office."

=== Liberal Democrats ===
Before the initial TIG breakaway, Liberal Democrats leader Vince Cable said that his party would "work with them in some form" but not be "subsumed" by them. Afterwards, he "offered a hand of friendship to the new Independent Group", seeing "the way forward as a collaborative arrangement, a confederation of groups who have a lot in common". On 20 February Cable also suggested that the Liberal Democrats might not put up candidates against members of the Independent Group at future elections. Former Liberal Democrat leader Tim Farron said in a radio interview that it was "entirely possible" that the two groups could merge to form a new centrist political party. Cable sought support from TIG for his proposed parliamentary motion for a second Brexit referendum.

In March 2019, it was reported by Business Insider that the Lib Dems and TIG discussed forming an electoral alliance where joint candidates would stand under the same "umbrella". Cable proposed standing joint candidates with the Greens and Change UK on a common policy of seeking a second referendum on Brexit at the European Parliament elections, but those parties rejected it. In April, an unverified internal Change UK memo leaked describing their plans to target Liberal Democrat donors and members in an attempt to supplant the larger party. It specified "No mergers, pacts or alliances." A week later, Cable said that while Change UK had thrown away opportunities in the European elections by not pooling their strength, they and the Lib Dems had agreed a "non-aggression pact" to discourage "friendly fire". After the Liberal Democrats came second in the European elections while Change UK won no seats, the Lib Dems suggested they would welcome Change UK MPs joining their party (as Umunna, Wollaston, Berger, Smith and Allen subsequently did).

== Structure and aims ==
The party was launched as a group of independent MPs with a convenor (initially Gavin Shuker) and spokesperson (initially Chuka Umunna). It was established without a formal policy platform. In March 2019, this structure was changed as the group applied for registration as a political party with Heidi Allen as its leader (on an interim basis until an annual conference could be held). The party's registration was confirmed in April. In June, Allen left the party and Anna Soubry replaced her as leader. By July, the party employed one member of staff on a full-time basis, down from 11 employed during the European elections.

Chris Leslie described Change UK as offering a home to those on the centre-left or in the "liberal" or "one nation" tradition. It was expressly pro-European, supporting calls for a further referendum on the UK's EU membership, and was considered to be centrist. Change UK's slogan was "Politics is broken. Let's change it", and it said it would pursue evidence-led policies, rather than those led by ideology, with the group being tolerant of differing opinions.

Specific stated values included a "diverse, mixed social market economy", freedom of the press, environmentalism, devolution, subsidiarity and opposition to Brexit. All of its MPs supported a second referendum on the EU. Although the party never published a manifesto, it listed eleven "values", including that the government must do "whatever it takes" to protect national security, as Britain is "a great country of which people are rightly proud." Shuker said "[we] back well-regulated business but in return we expect them to provide decent, secure and well-paid jobs" and Leslie stressed the group was pro-NATO.

On 14 March 2019, Wollaston's amendment calling for a second EU referendum was called by the Speaker of the House of Commons, the first TIG amendment to be called and the first time Parliament had the opportunity to directly vote on a second referendum. However, after both the People's Vote and Best for Britain campaigns advised supporters not to vote for the amendment, and the Labour Party whipped its MPs to abstain, the amendment fell 85–334.

== Funding ==
Change UK was supported in its aims by The Independent Group (TIG) Ltd (previously named Gemini A Ltd), a non-trading company started by Shuker and registered in England and Wales. Berger stated that the seven founders funded the launch themselves.

The group claimed thousands of donors gave small amounts within days of its launch. Five days afterwards, David Garrard, previously a major donor to the Labour Party, was reported to have given TIG £1.5 million. A "significant" donation to the group was later made by crossbencher Lord Myners, City Minister under Labour Prime Minister Gordon Brown. Change UK was not entitled to the parliamentary financial assistance for opposition parties (Short Money) as this is not available to political parties established in the middle of a parliamentary term.

A report by the party's auditors, published as part of the group's accounts filed with Companies House in May 2020, found that bank statements and records of donors had been "inappropriately destroyed" by staff members during the party's winding down and could not be satisfactorily reconstructed. Nothing had come to their attention to suggest there were any "material errors in the financial statements", but they were "unable to determine" whether any adjustments to financial statements "might have been found to be necessary had the scope of our work not been limited". In response, Soubry's partner, Neil Davidson, the party's treasurer, said that the party had "absolutely nothing to hide".

== Leadership ==
When TIG was formed, Gavin Shuker was named as its convenor and Chuka Umunna as spokesperson. The group took a collective approach to leadership, with Umunna saying that "all the members of our group have... a responsibility to provide leadership". Registration as a party required having a formal leader. Allen was appointed interim leader when the party was officially formed on 29 March, with the intention of electing a permanent leader at a party conference in September. When Allen left the party in June, Soubry took over as leader.

List of leaders
Name	Term	
Leader of Change UK Acting
Heidi Allen	29 March 2019	4 June 2019
Leader of The Independent Group for Change
Anna Soubry	4 June 2019	19 December 2019

== Members of elected bodies ==
The party was formed by eleven breakaway MPs – eight from Labour and three from the Conservatives – in 2019. Six of Change UK's eleven MPs left the party after it won no seats in the 2019 European Parliament election in May. Five of the six who quit Change UK went on to join the Liberal Democrats. None of the original eleven members of Change UK were elected in the 2019 general election in December. After failing to win any seats in the general election, the party, by then known as the Independent Group for Change, announced that it would disband.

=== Members of Parliament ===
==== MPs who remained in the party until dissolution ====
Name	Constituency	Former party	First elected	Joined
Ann Coffey	Stockport	Labour	9 April 1992	18 February 2019
Mike Gapes	Ilford South	Labour Co-op	9 April 1992	18 February 2019
Chris Leslie	Nottingham East	Labour Co-op	1 May 1997	18 February 2019
Joan Ryan	Enfield North	Labour	1 May 1997	19 February 2019
Anna Soubry	Broxtowe	Conservative	6 May 2010	20 February 2019
Key: Founding member

==== MPs who left the party ====
Name	Constituency	Former party	First elected	Joined	Left	Party at 2019 election
Heidi Allen	South Cambridgeshire	Conservative	7 May 2015	20 February 2019	4 June 2019	Liberal Democrats
Luciana Berger	Liverpool Wavertree	Labour Co-op	6 May 2010	18 February 2019	4 June 2019	Liberal Democrats
Gavin Shuker	Luton South	Labour Co-op	6 May 2010	18 February 2019	4 June 2019	Independent
Angela Smith	Penistone and Stocksbridge	Labour	5 May 2005	18 February 2019	4 June 2019	Liberal Democrats
Chuka Umunna	Streatham	Labour	6 May 2010	18 February 2019	4 June 2019	Liberal Democrats
Sarah Wollaston	Totnes	Conservative	6 May 2010	20 February 2019	4 June 2019	Liberal Democrats
Key: Founding member

=== Frontbench team ===
Heidi Allen announced a frontbench team after her appointment as interim leader in March 2019.

Name	Portfolio
Heidi Allen	Interim Leader
Heidi Allen	Spokesperson for Welfare, Pensions, Social Care and Business
Gavin Shuker	Group Convener
Chuka Umunna	Group Spokesperson
Chuka Umunna	Spokesperson for the Cabinet Office
Joan Ryan	Business Manager
Joan Ryan	Spokesperson for International Development
Sarah Wollaston	New MPs Manager
Luciana Berger	Spokesperson for Home Affairs, Health, Digital and Culture
Ann Coffey	Spokesperson for Children and Education
Mike Gapes	Spokesperson for Foreign Affairs and Defence
Chris Leslie	Spokesperson for Economics and Trade
Angela Smith	Spokesperson for Transport, Local Government, Housing, Energy and Environment
Anna Soubry	Spokesperson for Brexit and Justice

=== Representation in other levels of government ===
In February 2019, Labour councillors in over ten councils also left the party to align with TIG. Two former Labour councillors in Brighton and Hove left the party to form their own independent group on 25 February, aligning with the Parliamentary group. There were further resignations from Labour by councillors in Barnet, Bexley, Derby, Salford, Stafford, and Southwark and by Conservative councillors in South Bucks and Calderdale. A New Statesman report that month was unable to determine which of these councillors supported TIG/Change UK, but said that many gave the same reasons as the MPs: alleged antisemitism in Labour, Corbyn's leadership and Brexit.

Richard Ashworth, an MEP elected as a Conservative in 2014, a European People's Party-affiliated independent since 2018, joined Change UK in April. In the European election the following month, Ashworth was the first list candidate for Change UK in South East England but was not reelected, with the list gaining 4.2% of the votes.

== Electoral history ==
Election	Leader	Votes			Seats				Position
Election	Leader	#	%	In contested seats	#	±	In contested seats		Position
Election	Leader	#	%	%	#	±	#	±	Position
2019 European Parliament election	Heidi Allen	571,846	3.4	3.4	0 / 73	0 (Note: New party)	0 / 73	0	7th
2019 general election	Anna Soubry	10,006	0.03	6.3	0 / 650	▼5 (Note: Compared to at dissolution)	0 / 3	▼3	19th

== See also ==
- List of elected British politicians who have changed party affiliation
- List of Labour Party breakaway parties (UK)
