= Heidi Allen =

British politician (born 1975)

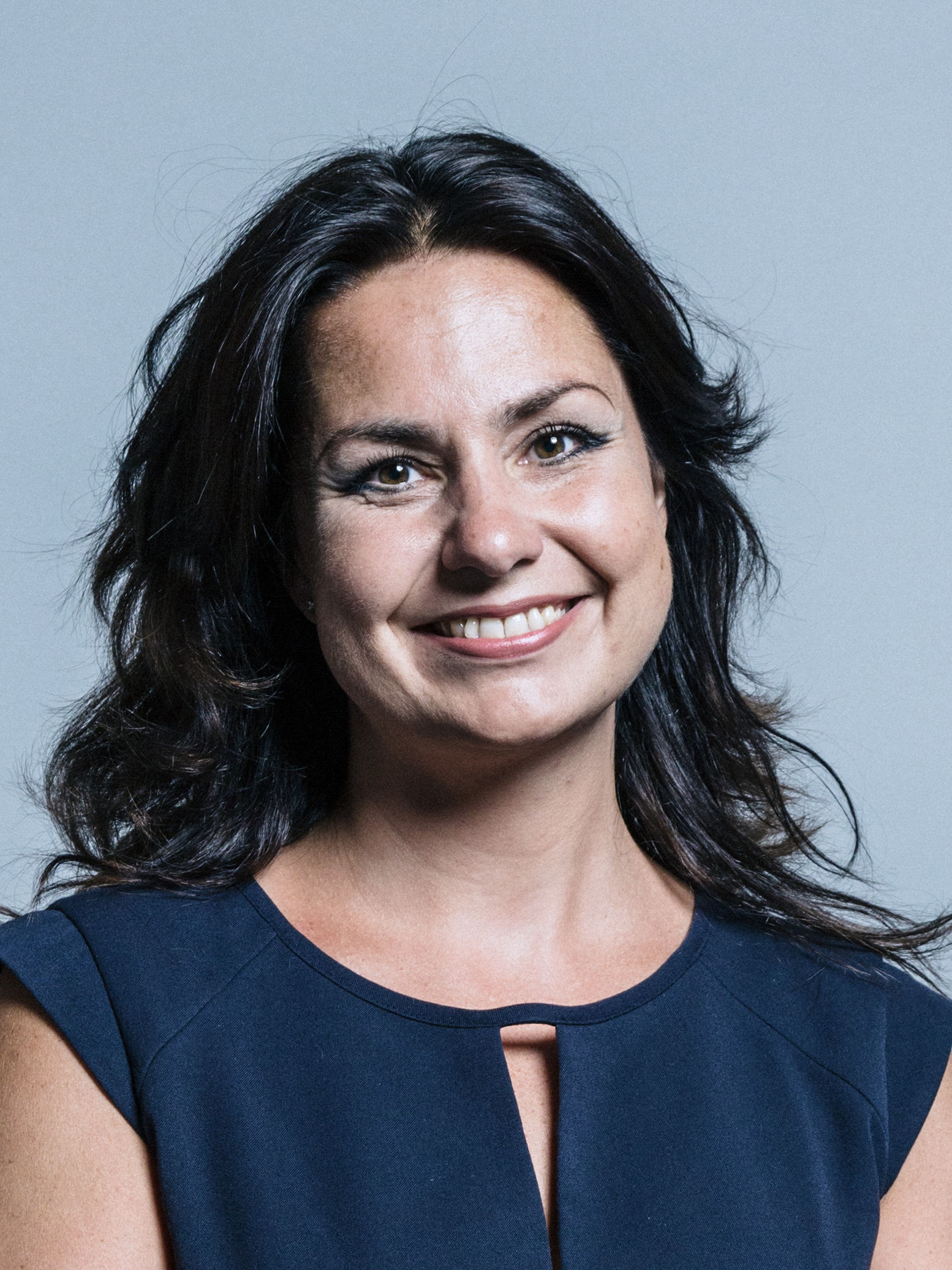
- Official portrait, 2017

Leader of Change UK (Note: The Independent Group (March–April 2019))
- Acting; 29 March 2019 – 4 June 2019
- Convener: Gavin Shuker
- Preceded by: Office established (Note: Gavin Shuker served as convener until Allen was appointed as party leader.)
- Succeeded by: Anna Soubry

Member of Parliament for South Cambridgeshire
- In office 7 May 2015 – 6 November 2019
- Preceded by: Andrew Lansley
- Succeeded by: Anthony Browne

Personal details
- Born: Heidi Suzanne Bancroft; 18 January 1975 (age 51) Notton, West Yorkshire, England
- Party: Liberal Democrats (since 2019)
- Other political affiliations: Parliamentary affiliation: The Independents (2019); Party membership: Conservative (until 2019); Change UK (2019); Independent (2019)
- Spouse: Phil Allen
- Education: University College London (BSc)
- Other offices: March–June 2019: Change UK Spokesperson for Welfare, Pensions, Social Care and Business

Heidi Suzanne Allen (née Bancroft; born 18 January 1975) is a British businesswoman and former politician who served as the Member of Parliament (MP) for South Cambridgeshire from 2015 to 2019. Initially elected as a Conservative, she resigned from the party in February 2019, joining and later serving as acting leader of Change UK. She resigned from Change UK in June of the same year, and joined the Liberal Democrats in October 2019. She announced on 29 October of that year that she would not stand for re-election at the next general election.

== Early life and career ==
Allen was born in 1975 in Notton, a small rural village near Wakefield in West Yorkshire. Her mother is German; her father worked for the colour division of ICI.

She attended Wakefield Girls' High School, where gained nine GCSEs in August 1991, and Maths, Physics, and Chemistry A-levels in August 1993. She played alto saxophone in the school swing band.

She received a BSc degree in astrophysics from University College London (1993–1996).

Allen worked in corporate positions, including with ExxonMobil and the Royal Mail. In 2008, she joined the family classic-motorcycle paints business, RS Bike Paints Limited, established by her parents in 1978 and now run by her husband Phil Allen.

Allen has said she was inspired to become active in politics after watching the scenes of the Tottenham riots; she first became a councillor in St Albans. Allen served as a councillor for 18 months before making a bid to become an MP.

== Parliamentary career ==
In February 2014, Allen ran in an open selection process for the South East Cambridgeshire parliamentary constituency Conservative Party candidacy. She was beaten by Lucy Frazer, but there was initially a controversy about a possible miscount of votes on Frazer's selection. Frazer was reaffirmed as the candidate in January 2014, and in October 2014 Allen was selected as prospective parliamentary candidate (PPC) for South Cambridgeshire.

The seat was held by the Conservative Andrew Lansley, then a cabinet minister, who had decided to stand down at the 2015 general election. Allen won the seat in the general election, increasing the Conservative majority and taking 51.1% of the votes cast.

In July 2015, Allen was elected to the Work and Pensions Select Committee. Allen made her maiden speech before the House of Commons on 20 October 2015, when she detailed criticism of proposed cuts to tax credits, saying, "because today I can sit on my hands no longer". She wanted to criticise the proposed tax credit cuts and to intervene before it was "too late" to stop the changes to tax credits, even though she did not wish to support the motion put forward by Labour because she disagreed with the party's overall stance, whilst also not being in favour of the Government's motion over tax credit cuts. Isabel Hardman of The Spectator described her speech as "truly brave" and "well argued". Despite her speech, she voted in favour of tax credit cuts, in line with the Conservative whip.

Allen supported continued membership of the European Union in the 2016 referendum.

On 5 December 2016, Allen announced her intention to put her name forward for the Conservative nomination for the election of Mayor of Cambridgeshire and Peterborough in May 2017. Allen proposed to combine the role with her current position as MP for South Cambridgeshire. In January 2017, she failed to win the Conservative Party nomination for the role.

In June 2017, Allen was re-elected as Member of Parliament for South Cambridgeshire in the snap general election. Over that summer it was mooted that Jacob Rees-Mogg would be a candidate for the leadership of the Conservative Party, and Allen announced that if he became leader she would leave the party.

In December 2017, Allen was tearful during a House of Commons debate on Universal Credit after hearing fellow MP, Frank Field, describe how he had talked a man out of suicide. The Department for Work and Pensions later stated that "the two examples that [Field] gave were not claimants on Universal Credit." In the same month Allen voted along with fellow Conservative Dominic Grieve and nine other Tory MPs against the government, and in favour of guaranteeing Parliament a "meaningful vote" on any Brexit deal Theresa May might agree with Brussels.

In June 2018, during a debate on changing the abortion laws in Northern Ireland following a referendum in the Republic of Ireland which would amend the Constitution of Ireland to allow terminations, Allen said that she had an abortion for health reasons when she was younger. She stated: "I was ill when I made the incredibly hard decision to have a termination: I was having seizures every day, I wasn't even able to control my own body, let alone care for a new life... I am a modern, progressive woman in this country and I am proud that this country is my home... How can it be that Northern Ireland will soon be the only part of Great Britain and Ireland where terminations are to all intents and purposes outlawed?"

In September 2018, Allen spoke in favour of a second referendum on the UK leaving the European Union. Allen said she feared the danger to jobs and businesses in her constituency and the whole nation from leaving the EU without a deal. Allen blamed the party's Eurosceptic right-wing for the possibility of a no-deal Brexit, and called them "fiscally and economically irresponsible". Allen stated that a second referendum should include the option of staying in the EU under current terms. In early 2019, she co-founded the group Right to Vote.

In August 2019, a pro-Brexit former Royal Marine was jailed for 24 weeks after threatening Allen online, including posting aerial images of her home on social media.

=== The Independent Group, Change UK and the Independents ===
On 20 February 2019, Allen, along with Anna Soubry and Sarah Wollaston, resigned from the Conservative Party to join The Independent Group, later Change UK. On 29 March 2019, it was announced Change UK had applied to become a political party and Allen would be appointed interim leader.

In May 2019, Allen threatened to resign as leader during an internal party row about whether Change UK should back the Liberal Democrats in some regions at the European elections. Allen denied her party was in disarray. In June 2019, she left Change UK to sit as an independent MP. In July 2019, Allen founded a looser grouping of MPs called The Independents.

=== Liberal Democrats ===
On 7 October 2019, it was announced that Allen had joined the Liberal Democrats and would initially stand for the party in her South Cambridgeshire constituency at the next election.

On 29 October, she announced that she would not stand in the next election regardless of the outcome of the vote to call for an election in December 2019. She said that Brexit had "broken our politics" and only a new referendum could solve the deadlock. She added that she was "exhausted by the invasion into my privacy and the nastiness and intimidation that has become commonplace".

=== Political beliefs ===
During an ITV interview in March 2019, she stated how much she admired Nick Clegg. She mused that Clegg would be her first choice to go into her fantasy cabinet as Deputy PM if she ever became prime minister; she later stated that she is too emotional ever to fill that role. In July 2019, she campaigned for the Liberal Democrat candidate in the Brecon and Radnorshire parliamentary by-election held on 1 August.

== Post-parliamentary career ==
In August 2021, Allen became chair of CHS Group housing association. She said, "When I decided to stand down from being the MP for South Cambridgeshire, I knew it would be important for me to continue contributing to my local community. I believe passionately that those of us fortunate enough to be in a position to help, must do what we can to support people on lower incomes and the more vulnerable members of our society."

== Personal life ==
Allen currently lives in Elsworth, Cambridgeshire with her husband Phil.

== Notes ==
Parliament of the United Kingdom
Preceded by Andrew Lansley	Member of Parliament for South Cambridgeshire; 2015–2019	Succeeded by Anthony Browne
