= List of MPs elected in the 2017 United Kingdom general election =

2017–2019 Parliament of the United Kingdom
| ← | 2015–2017 Parliament | 2019–2024 Parliament | → |
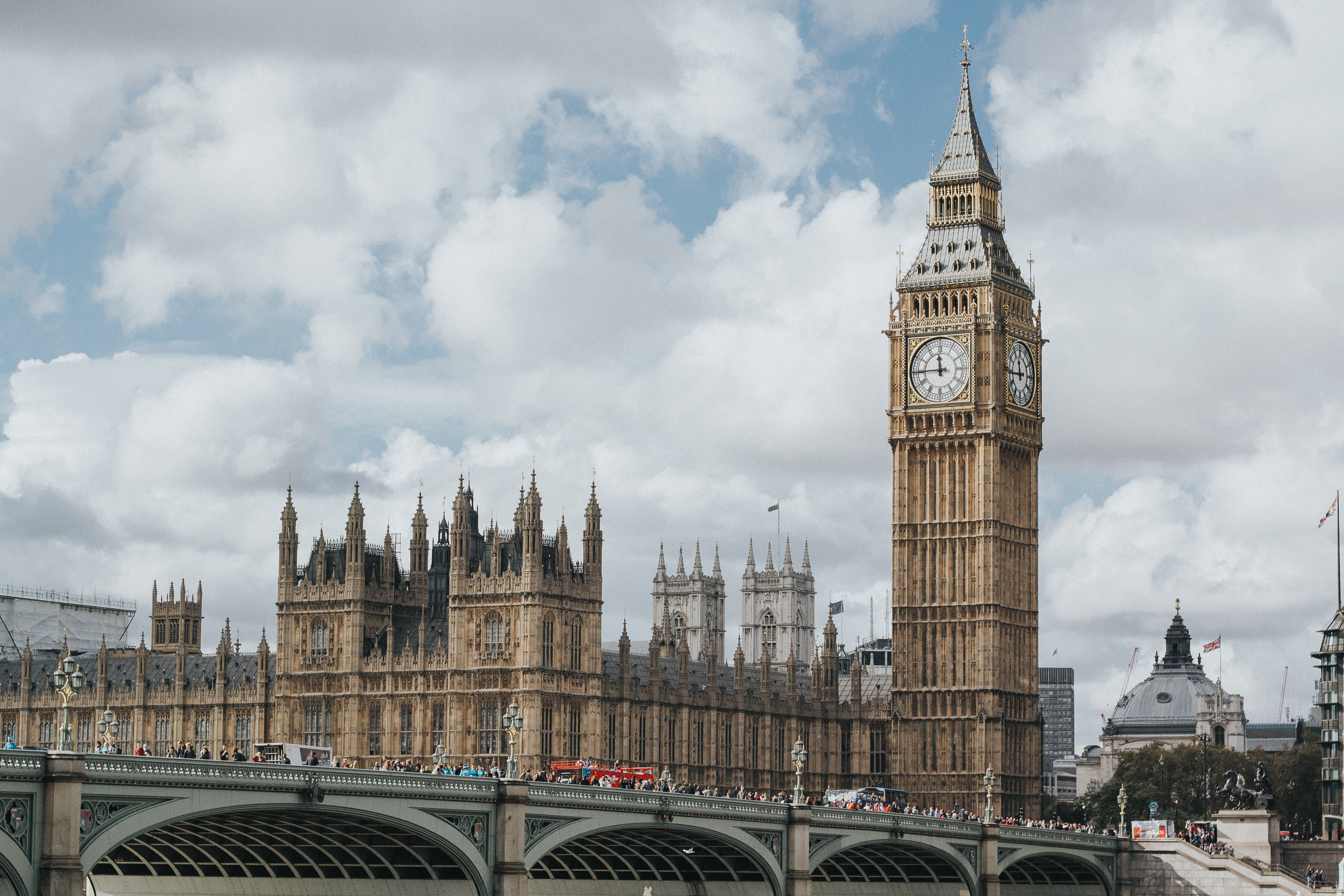
- Palace of Westminster in 2017

Overview
- Legislative body: Parliament of the United Kingdom
- Meeting place: Palace of Westminster
- Term: 21 June 2017 – 6 November 2019
- Election: 2017 United Kingdom general election
- Government: Second May ministry (until 24 July 2019); First Johnson ministry (from 24 July 2019)

House of Commons
- Members: 650
- Speaker: John Bercow until 4 November 2019; Sir Lindsay Hoyle from 4 November 2019
- Leader: Andrea Leadsom until 22 May 2019; Mel Stride from 23 May 2019; Jacob Rees-Mogg from 24 July 2019
- Prime Minister: Theresa May (Conservative Party) until 24 July 2019; Boris Johnson (Conservative Party) from 24 July 2019
- Leader of the Opposition: Jeremy Corbyn (Labour Party)
- Third-party leader: Ian Blackford (Scottish National Party)

House of Lords
- Members: 776
- Lord Speaker: The Lord Fowler
- Leader: The Baroness Evans of Bowes Park
- Leader of the Opposition: The Baroness Smith of Basildon

Crown-in-Parliament Queen Elizabeth II

Sessions
- 1st: 21 June 2017 – 8 October 2019 (Note: Presumed prorogued 9–24 September 2019; expunged and recorded as adjourned following its ruling unlawful)
- 2nd: 14 October – 6 November 2019

In the United Kingdom's 2017 general election, 650 Members of Parliament (MPs) were elected to the House of Commons – one for each parliamentary constituency. A record number of women (208) were elected as MPs.

Parliament consists of the House of Lords and the elected House of Commons. The State Opening of Parliament at the Palace of Westminster by Queen Elizabeth II was on 21 June 2017. The subsequent parliamentary session was the longest since the formation of the United Kingdom in 1707, and the longest to sit at Westminster since the Long Parliament in the 17th century. The second and last parliamentary session however was the shortest since October 1948, lasting less than a month, from 14 October 2019 until Parliament dissolved at 00:01 on 6 November 2019. Notable newcomers to enter the House of Commons in this General Election included future Secretary of State for Scotland Alister Jack and future Scottish Conservative leader Douglas Ross. For the opposition, newcomers included Shadow Chancellor of the Exchequer Anneliese Dodds and future Shadow Secretary of State for Women and Equalities Marsha de Cordova.

The Parliament was marked by extraordinary political turmoil as Governments led by Theresa May and Boris Johnson were unable to win a series of important votes on the issue of Brexit. This left both Parliament and the Government in a prolonged state of deadlock and unable to move forward on the issue. Consequently, there was an unusually high number of defections and suspensions, including the suspension of 21 Conservative MPs in September 2019; 10 of those suspended MPs re-joined the Conservative Party in October 2019. The Parliament was dissolved after MPs passed the Early Parliamentary General Election Act 2019, which bypassed the Fixed-term Parliaments Act 2011 to bring the next election forward to December 2019 from its original scheduled May 2022 date.

== House of Commons composition ==
Below are graphical representations of the House of Commons showing party strengths directly after the 2017 general election, at important intermediate points, and immediately prior to dissolution. This is not an actual seating plan of the House, which has only five rows of benches on each side, with the government party to the right of the Speaker of the House of Commons and opposition parties to the left, but with room for only around two-thirds of MPs to sit at any one time.

2017–19 UK House of Commons

As at dissolution (see image description page for date)

18 February 2019 (following the initial Labour defections to the Independent Group)

19 December 2018

26 June 2017

The number of MPs in each party
| Affiliation | Members | | |
| Affiliation | At 2017 election | At dissolution | Change |
|---|---|---|---|
| The Speaker | 1 | 1 | Steady |
Registered parliamentary parties
| Conservative – Gov | 317 | 298 | ▼19 |
| Labour – Opp | 262 | 242 | ▼20 |
| SNP | 35 | 35 | Steady |
| Liberal Democrats | 12 | 20 | ▲8 |
| DUP – C&S | 10 | 10 | Steady |
| Sinn Féin | 7 | 7 | Steady |
| Change UK | —N/a | 5 | ▲5 |
| Plaid Cymru | 4 | 4 | Steady |
| Green | 1 | 1 | Steady |
Others
| Independent | 1 | 21 | ▲20 |
| The Independents | —N/a | 2 | ▲2 |
| BSJP | —N/a | 1 | ▲1 |
| Suspended | —N/a | 1 | ▲1 |
| Vacant | —N/a | 2 | ▲2 |
| Total | 650 | | Steady |
| Voting total | 639 | 637 | ▼2 |
| Safe majority | 320 | 319 | ▼1 |
| Gov short by | 4 | 22 | ▲18 |
| Gov + C&S total | 326 | 307 | ▼19 |
| Gov + C&S majority | 13 | -23 | ▼36 |

Notes

- For full details of changes during this Parliament, see Defections and suspensions and By-elections.
- Labour, as the largest party not in government, took the role of Official Opposition (OO). The Co-operative Party was represented in the House of Commons by Labour MPs sitting with the Labour and Co-operative designation.
- "Members elected" refers to the composition resulting from the election on 8 June 2017, but note that the confidence and supply arrangement (C&S) was only reached on 26 June.
- The "voting total" is the effective size of the House excluding vacancies, suspensions, and certain members (ten at dissolution): the Speaker, two (usually three) Deputy Speakers (one Labour and one Conservative) who had only a tie-breaking vote constrained by conventions, and seven abstentionist members (Sinn Féin). This left relevant party voting totals as follows: Con 297, Lab 241, SF 0, Speaker 0.
- The "safe majority" (the number of seats needed to have a majority of one or two), "Gov short by" (the margin by which the governing Conservatives are short of that majority), and "Gov + C&S total" are based on the voting totals. The government entered into a confidence and supply agreement to secure a small majority, which shrank due to defections, finally disappearing on 3 September 2019. Hence, the "Gov + C&S majority", calculated as the sum of voting Conservative and Democratic Unionist Party members, less the sum of all other voting members, was negative at dissolution.

== List of MPs elected in the general election ==
The following table is a list of MPs elected, ordered by constituency. Names of incumbents are listed where they stood for re-election; for details of other defeated candidates and the incumbent who stood down in those cases see individual constituency articles.

| Constituency | Party of incumbent before election | Member returned (2017) | Party | Notes | Job before elected as MP |
|---|---|---|---|---|---|
| Aberavon | Labour | Stephen Kinnock | Labour | Seat held | Managing director of the Global Leadership and Technology Exchange for Xynteo & Spouse of the Prime Minister of Denmark |
| Aberconwy | Conservative | Guto Bebb | Conservative | Seat held | Business Development Director of Innovas Wales |
| Aberdeen North | Scottish National | Kirsty Blackman | Scottish National | Seat held | Teacher |
| Aberdeen South | Scottish National | Ross Thomson | Conservative | Seat gain, defeated incumbent Callum McCaig | Member of the Scottish Parliament for North East Scotland & Store trainer for Debenhams |
| Airdrie and Shotts | Scottish National | Neil Gray | Scottish National | Seat held | Radio Producer for BBC Radio Orkney |
| Aldershot | Conservative | Leo Docherty | Conservative | Seat held, incumbent Sir Gerald Howarth stood down | Director of the Conservative Middle East Council & Army Officer |
| Aldridge-Brownhills | Conservative | Wendy Morton | Conservative | Seat held | Businesswoman |
| Altrincham and Sale West | Conservative | Graham Brady | Conservative | Seat held | Director of Public Affairs for Waterfront Partnership |
| Alyn and Deeside | Labour | Mark Tami | Labour | Seat held | Trade Unionist |
| Amber Valley | Conservative | Nigel Mills | Conservative | Seat held | Chartered Accountant |
| Angus | Scottish National | Kirstene Hair | Conservative | Seat gain, defeated incumbent Mike Weir | Events Manager for DC Thomson |
| Arfon | Plaid Cymru | Hywel Williams | Plaid Cymru | Seat held | Social Worker |
| Argyll and Bute | Scottish National | Brendan O'Hara | Scottish National | Seat held | TV Producer for STV |
| Arundel and South Downs | Conservative | Nick Herbert | Conservative | Seat held | Director of Reform |
| Ashfield | Labour | Gloria De Piero | Labour | Seat held | Political Editor of GMTV |
| Ashford | Conservative | Damian Green | Conservative | Seat held | Journalist |
| Ashton-under-Lyne | Labour | Angela Rayner | Labour | Seat held | Trade Unionist |
| Aylesbury | Conservative | David Lidington | Conservative | Seat held | Special Adviser to Douglas Hurd |
| Ayr, Carrick and Cumnock | Scottish National | Bill Grant | Conservative | Seat gain, defeated incumbent Corri Wilson | Fireman |
| Banbury | Conservative | Victoria Prentis | Conservative | Seat held | Civil Servant in the Government Legal Department |
| Banff and Buchan | Scottish National | David Duguid | Conservative | Seat gain, defeated incumbent Eilidh Whiteford | Engineer |
| Barking | Labour | Margaret Hodge | Labour | Seat held | Consultant at PricewaterhouseCoopers |
| Barnsley Central | Labour | Dan Jarvis | Labour | Seat held | Army Officer |
| Barnsley East | Labour | Stephanie Peacock | Labour | Seat held, incumbent Michael Dugher stood down | Trade Unionist |
| Barrow and Furness | Labour Co-operative | John Woodcock | Labour Co-operative | Seat held | Special Advisor to Gordon Brown |
| Basildon and Billericay | Conservative | John Baron | Conservative | Seat held | Hedge Fund Manager & Army Officer |
| Basingstoke | Conservative | Maria Miller | Conservative | Seat held | Director of the Rowland Group |
| Bassetlaw | Labour | John Mann | Labour | Seat held | Trade unionist |
| Bath | Conservative | Wera Hobhouse | Liberal Democrats | Seat gain, defeated incumbent Ben Howlett | Teacher |
| Batley and Spen | Labour Co-operative | Tracy Brabin | Labour Co-operative | Seat held | Actress |
| Battersea | Conservative | Marsha de Cordova | Labour | Seat gain, defeated incumbent Jane Ellison | Charity Worker |
| Beaconsfield | Conservative | Dominic Grieve | Conservative | Seat held | Barrister |
| Beckenham | Conservative | Bob Stewart | Conservative | Seat held | Army Officer |
| Bedford | Conservative | Mohammad Yasin | Labour | Seat gain, defeated incumbent Conservative Richard Fuller | Taxi driver & Bedford Borough Councillor |
| Belfast East | DUP | Gavin Robinson | DUP | Seat held | Barrister |
| Belfast North | DUP | Nigel Dodds | DUP | Seat held | Barrister |
| Belfast South | SDLP | Emma Little-Pengelly | DUP | Seat gain, defeated incumbent Alasdair McDonnell | Special Advisor to Peter Robinson |
| Belfast West | Sinn Féin | Paul Maskey | Sinn Féin | Seat held | Tourism Manager |
| Bermondsey and Old Southwark | Labour | Neil Coyle | Labour | Seat held | Director of Policy and Campaigns at Disability Rights UK |
| Berwick-upon-Tweed | Conservative | Anne-Marie Trevelyan | Conservative | Seat held | Chartered Accountant |
| Berwickshire, Roxburgh and Selkirk | Scottish National | John Lamont | Conservative | Seat gain, defeated incumbent Calum Kerr | Member of the Scottish Parliament for Ettrick, Roxburgh and Berwickshire & Solicitor |
| Bethnal Green and Bow | Labour | Rushanara Ali | Labour | Seat held | Director of the Young Foundation |
| Beverley and Holderness | Conservative | Graham Stuart | Conservative | Seat held | Solicitor |
| Bexhill and Battle | Conservative | Huw Merriman | Conservative | Seat held | Barrister |
| Bexleyheath and Crayford | Conservative | David Evennett | Conservative | Seat held | Insurance Broker |
| Birkenhead | Labour | Frank Field | Labour | Seat held | Director of the Child Poverty Action Group |
| Birmingham, Edgbaston | Labour Co-operative | Preet Gill | Labour Co-operative | Seat held, incumbent Gisela Stuart stood down | Social Worker |
| Birmingham, Erdington | Labour | Jack Dromey | Labour | Seat held | Trade Unionist & Treasurer of the Labour Party |
| Birmingham, Hall Green | Labour | Roger Godsiff | Labour | Seat held | Trade Unionist |
| Birmingham, Hodge Hill | Labour | Liam Byrne | Labour | Seat held | Investment Banker |
| Birmingham, Ladywood | Labour | Shabana Mahmood | Labour | Seat held | Solicitor |
| Birmingham, Northfield | Labour | Richard Burden | Labour | Seat held | Trade Unionist |
| Birmingham, Perry Barr | Labour | Khalid Mahmood | Labour | Seat held | Engineer |
| Birmingham, Selly Oak | Labour | Steve McCabe | Labour | Seat held | Care worker |
| Birmingham, Yardley | Labour | Jess Phillips | Labour | Seat held | Business Development Manager for Women's Aid Federation of England |
| Bishop Auckland | Labour | Helen Goodman | Labour | Seat held | Chief executive of the National Association of Toy and Leisure Libraries |
| Blackburn | Labour | Kate Hollern | Labour | Seat held | Contracts Manager at Blackburn College |
| Blackley and Broughton | Labour | Graham Stringer | Labour | Seat held | Analytical Chemist |
| Blackpool North and Cleveleys | Conservative | Paul Maynard | Conservative | Seat held | Special Advisor to Liam Fox |
| Blackpool South | Labour | Gordon Marsden | Labour | Seat held | Lecturer at the Open University |
| Blaenau Gwent | Labour | Nick Smith | Labour | Seat held | Director of Policy and Partnerships at the Royal College of Speech and Language Therapists |
| Blaydon | Labour | Liz Twist | Labour | Seat held, incumbent David Anderson stood down | Trade Unionist |
| Blyth Valley | Labour | Ronnie Campbell | Labour | Seat held | Miner |
| Bognor Regis and Littlehampton | Conservative | Nick Gibb | Conservative | Seat held | Chartered Accountant |
| Bolsover | Labour | Dennis Skinner | Labour | Seat held | Miner |
| Bolton North East | Labour | Sir David Crausby | Labour | Seat held | Trade Unionist |
| Bolton South East | Labour | Yasmin Qureshi | Labour | Seat held | Barrister |
| Bolton West | Conservative | Chris Green | Conservative | Seat held | Engineer |
| Bootle | Labour | Peter Dowd | Labour | Seat held | Social worker and Councillor |
| Boston and Skegness | Conservative | Matt Warman | Conservative | Seat held | Journalist for The Daily Telegraph |
| Bosworth | Conservative | David Tredinnick | Conservative | Seat held | Manager at Malden Mitcham Properties |
| Bournemouth East | Conservative | Tobias Ellwood | Conservative | Seat held | Army Officer |
| Bournemouth West | Conservative | Conor Burns | Conservative | Seat held | |
| Bracknell | Conservative | Phillip Lee | Conservative | Seat held | |
| Bradford East | Labour | Imran Hussain | Labour | Seat held | |
| Bradford South | Labour | Judith Cummins | Labour | Seat held | |
| Bradford West | Labour | Naz Shah | Labour | Seat held | |
| Braintree | Conservative | James Cleverly | Conservative | Seat held | |
| Brecon and Radnorshire | Conservative | Christopher Davies | Conservative | Seat held | |
| Brent Central | Labour | Dawn Butler | Labour | Seat held | |
| Brent North | Labour | Barry Gardiner | Labour | Seat held | |
| Brentford and Isleworth | Labour | Ruth Cadbury | Labour | Seat held | |
| Brentwood and Ongar | Conservative | Alex Burghart | Conservative | Seat held, incumbent Sir Eric Pickles stood down | |
| Bridgend | Labour | Madeleine Moon | Labour | Seat held | |
| Bridgwater and West Somerset | Conservative | Ian Liddell-Grainger | Conservative | Seat held | |
| Brigg and Goole | Conservative | Andrew Percy | Conservative | Seat held | |
| Brighton Kemptown | Conservative | Lloyd Russell-Moyle | Labour Co-operative | Seat gain, defeated incumbent Simon Kirby | |
| Brighton Pavilion | Green | Caroline Lucas | Green | Seat held | |
| Bristol East | Labour | Kerry McCarthy | Labour | Seat held | |
| Bristol North West | Conservative | Darren Jones | Labour | Seat gain, defeated incumbent Charlotte Leslie | |
| Bristol South | Labour | Karin Smyth | Labour | Seat held | |
| Bristol West | Labour | Thangam Debbonaire | Labour | Seat held | |
| Broadland | Conservative | Keith Simpson | Conservative | Seat held | |
| Bromley and Chislehurst | Conservative | Bob Neill | Conservative | Seat held | |
| Bromsgrove | Conservative | Sajid Javid | Conservative | Seat held | |
| Broxbourne | Conservative | Charles Walker | Conservative | Seat held | |
| Broxtowe | Conservative | Anna Soubry | Conservative | Seat held | |
| Buckingham | The Speaker | John Bercow | Speaker | Seat held | |
| Burnley | Labour | Julie Cooper | Labour | Seat held | |
| Burton | Conservative | Andrew Griffiths | Conservative | Seat held | |
| Bury North | Conservative | James Frith | Labour | Seat gain, defeated incumbent David Nuttall | |
| Bury South | Labour | Ivan Lewis | Labour | Seat held, suspended by Labour November 2017 | |
| Bury St Edmunds | Conservative | Jo Churchill | Conservative | Seat held | |
| Caerphilly | Labour | Wayne David | Labour | Seat held | |
| Caithness, Sutherland and Easter Ross | Scottish National | Jamie Stone | Liberal Democrats | Seat gain, defeated incumbent Paul Monaghan | |
| Calder Valley | Conservative | Craig Whittaker | Conservative | Seat held | |
| Camberwell and Peckham | Labour | Harriet Harman | Labour | Seat held | |
| Camborne and Redruth | Conservative | George Eustice | Conservative | Seat held | |
| Cambridge | Labour | Daniel Zeichner | Labour | Seat held | |
| Cannock Chase | Conservative | Amanda Milling | Conservative | Seat held | |
| Canterbury | Conservative | Rosie Duffield | Labour | Seat gain, defeated incumbent Julian Brazier | |
| Cardiff Central | Labour | Jo Stevens | Labour | Seat held | |
| Cardiff North | Conservative | Anna McMorrin | Labour | Seat gain, defeated incumbent Craig Williams | |
| Cardiff South and Penarth | Labour Co-operative | Stephen Doughty | Labour Co-operative | Seat held | |
| Cardiff West | Labour | Kevin Brennan | Labour | Seat held | |
| Carlisle | Conservative | John Stevenson | Conservative | Seat held | |
| Carmarthen East and Dinefwr | Plaid Cymru | Jonathan Edwards | Plaid Cymru | Seat held | |
| Carmarthen West and South Pembrokeshire | Conservative | Simon Hart | Conservative | Seat held | |
| Carshalton and Wallington | Liberal Democrats | Tom Brake | Liberal Democrats | Seat held | |
| Castle Point | Conservative | Rebecca Harris | Conservative | Seat held | |
| Central Ayrshire | Scottish National | Philippa Whitford | Scottish National | Seat held | |
| Central Devon | Conservative | Mel Stride | Conservative | Seat held | |
| Central Suffolk and North Ipswich | Conservative | Daniel Poulter | Conservative | Seat held | |
| Ceredigion | Liberal Democrats | Ben Lake | Plaid Cymru | Seat gain, defeated incumbent Mark Williams | |
| Charnwood | Conservative | Edward Argar | Conservative | Seat held | |
| Chatham and Aylesford | Conservative | Tracey Crouch | Conservative | Seat held | |
| Cheadle | Conservative | Mary Robinson | Conservative | Seat held | |
| Chelmsford | Conservative | Vicky Ford | Conservative | Seat held, incumbent Sir Simon Burns stood down | |
| Chelsea and Fulham | Conservative | Greg Hands | Conservative | Seat held | |
| Cheltenham | Conservative | Alex Chalk | Conservative | Seat held | |
| Chesham and Amersham | Conservative | Cheryl Gillan | Conservative | Seat held | |
| Chesterfield | Labour | Toby Perkins | Labour | Seat held | |
| Chichester | Conservative | Gillian Keegan | Conservative | Seat held, incumbent Andrew Tyrie stood down | |
| Chingford and Woodford Green | Conservative | Iain Duncan Smith | Conservative | Seat held | |
| Chippenham | Conservative | Michelle Donelan | Conservative | Seat held | |
| Chipping Barnet | Conservative | Theresa Villiers | Conservative | Seat held | |
| Chorley | Labour | Lindsay Hoyle | Labour | Seat held | |
| Christchurch | Conservative | Christopher Chope | Conservative | Seat held | |
| Cities of London and Westminster | Conservative | Mark Field | Conservative | Seat held | |
| City of Chester | Labour | Chris Matheson | Labour | Seat held | |
| Clacton | Independent (Note: The incumbents for these seats were originally members of political parties before either being suspended or resigning from their respective parties and subsequently sitting as independents for the remainder of the Parliament.) | Giles Watling | Conservative | Seat gain, incumbent Douglas Carswell (originally a UKIP MP) stood down | |
| Cleethorpes | Conservative | Martin Vickers | Conservative | Seat held | |
| Clwyd South | Labour | Susan Elan Jones | Labour | Seat held | |
| Clwyd West | Conservative | David Jones | Conservative | Seat held | |
| Coatbridge, Chryston and Bellshill | Scottish National | Hugh Gaffney | Labour | Seat gain, defeated incumbent Phil Boswell | |
| Colchester | Conservative | Will Quince | Conservative | Seat held | |
| Colne Valley | Conservative | Thelma Walker | Labour | Seat gain, defeated incumbent Jason McCartney | |
| Congleton | Conservative | Fiona Bruce | Conservative | Seat held | |
| Copeland | Conservative | Trudy Harrison | Conservative | Seat held | |
| Corby | Conservative | Tom Pursglove | Conservative | Seat held | |
| The Cotswolds | Conservative | Geoffrey Clifton-Brown | Conservative | Seat held | |
| Coventry North East | Labour | Colleen Fletcher | Labour | Seat held | |
| Coventry North West | Labour | Geoffrey Robinson | Labour | Seat held | |
| Coventry South | Labour | Jim Cunningham | Labour | Seat held | |
| Crawley | Conservative | Henry Smith | Conservative | Seat held | |
| Crewe and Nantwich | Conservative | Laura Smith | Labour | Seat gain, defeated incumbent Edward Timpson | |
| Croydon Central | Conservative | Sarah Jones | Labour | Seat gain, defeated incumbent Gavin Barwell | |
| Croydon North | Labour Co-operative | Steve Reed | Labour Co-operative | Seat held | |
| Croydon South | Conservative | Chris Philp | Conservative | Seat held | |
| Cumbernauld, Kilsyth and Kirkintilloch East | Scottish National | Stuart McDonald | Scottish National | Seat held | |
| Cynon Valley | Labour | Ann Clwyd | Labour | Seat held | |
| Dagenham and Rainham | Labour | Jon Cruddas | Labour | Seat held | |
| Darlington | Labour | Jenny Chapman | Labour | Seat held | |
| Dartford | Conservative | Gareth Johnson | Conservative | Seat held | |
| Daventry | Conservative | Chris Heaton-Harris | Conservative | Seat held | |
| Delyn | Labour | David Hanson | Labour | Seat held | |
| Denton and Reddish | Labour | Andrew Gwynne | Labour | Seat held | |
| Derby North | Conservative | Chris Williamson | Labour | Seat gain, defeated incumbent Amanda Solloway | |
| Derby South | Labour | Margaret Beckett | Labour | Seat held | |
| Derbyshire Dales | Conservative | Patrick McLoughlin | Conservative | Seat held | |
| Devizes | Conservative | Claire Perry | Conservative | Seat held | |
| Dewsbury | Labour | Paula Sherriff | Labour | Seat held | |
| Don Valley | Labour | Caroline Flint | Labour | Seat held | |
| Doncaster Central | Labour | Rosie Winterton | Labour | Seat held | |
| Doncaster North | Labour | Ed Miliband | Labour | Seat held | |
| Dover | Conservative | Charlie Elphicke | Conservative | Seat held | |
| Dudley North | Labour | Ian Austin | Labour | Seat held | |
| Dudley South | Conservative | Mike Wood | Conservative | Seat held | |
| Dulwich and West Norwood | Labour | Helen Hayes | Labour | Seat held | |
| Dumfries and Galloway | Scottish National | Alister Jack | Conservative | Seat gain, defeated incumbent Richard Arkless | |
| Dumfriesshire, Clydesdale and Tweeddale | Conservative | David Mundell | Conservative | Seat held | |
| Dundee East | Scottish National | Stewart Hosie | Scottish National | Seat held | |
| Dundee West | Scottish National | Chris Law | Scottish National | Seat held | |
| Dunfermline and West Fife | Scottish National | Douglas Chapman | Scottish National | Seat held | |
| City of Durham | Labour | Roberta Blackman-Woods | Labour | Seat held | |
| Dwyfor Meirionnydd | Plaid Cymru | Liz Saville-Roberts | Plaid Cymru | Seat held | |
| Ealing Central and Acton | Labour | Rupa Huq | Labour | Seat held | |
| Ealing North | Labour | Stephen Pound | Labour | Seat held | |
| Ealing Southall | Labour | Virendra Sharma | Labour | Seat held | |
| Easington | Labour | Grahame Morris | Labour | Seat held | |
| East Antrim | DUP | Sammy Wilson | DUP | Seat held | |
| East Devon | Conservative | Hugo Swire | Conservative | Seat held | |
| East Dunbartonshire | Scottish National | Jo Swinson | Liberal Democrats | Seat gain, defeated incumbent John Nicolson | |
| East Ham | Labour | Stephen Timms | Labour | Seat held | |
| East Hampshire | Conservative | Damian Hinds | Conservative | Seat held | |
| East Kilbride, Strathaven and Lesmahagow | Scottish National | Lisa Cameron | Scottish National | Seat held | |
| East Londonderry | DUP | Gregory Campbell | DUP | Seat held | |
| East Lothian | Scottish National | Martin Whitfield | Labour | Seat gain, defeated incumbent George Kerevan | |
| East Renfrewshire | Scottish National | Paul Masterton | Conservative | Seat gain, defeated incumbent Kirsten Oswald | |
| East Surrey | Conservative | Sam Gyimah | Conservative | Seat held | |
| East Worthing and Shoreham | Conservative | Tim Loughton | Conservative | Seat held | |
| East Yorkshire | Conservative | Greg Knight | Conservative | Seat held | |
| Eastbourne | Conservative | Stephen Lloyd | Liberal Democrats | Seat gain, defeated incumbent Caroline Ansell | |
| Eastleigh | Conservative | Mims Davies | Conservative | Seat held | |
| Eddisbury | Conservative | Antoinette Sandbach | Conservative | Seat held | |
| Edinburgh East | Scottish National | Tommy Sheppard | Scottish National | Seat held | |
| Edinburgh North and Leith | Scottish National | Deidre Brock | Scottish National | Seat held | |
| Edinburgh South | Labour | Ian Murray | Labour | Seat held | |
| Edinburgh South West | Scottish National | Joanna Cherry | Scottish National | Seat held | |
| Edinburgh West | Independent | Christine Jardine | Liberal Democrats | Seat gain, incumbent Michelle Thomson (originally a Scottish National MP) stood down | |
| Edmonton | Labour Co-operative | Kate Osamor | Labour Co-operative | Seat held | |
| Ellesmere Port and Neston | Labour | Justin Madders | Labour | Seat held | |
| Elmet and Rothwell | Conservative | Alec Shelbrooke | Conservative | Seat held | |
| Eltham | Labour | Clive Efford | Labour | Seat held | |
| Enfield North | Labour | Joan Ryan | Labour | Seat held | |
| Enfield Southgate | Conservative | Bambos Charalambous | Labour | Seat gain, defeated incumbent David Burrowes | |
| Epping Forest | Conservative | Eleanor Laing | Conservative | Seat held | |
| Epsom and Ewell | Conservative | Chris Grayling | Conservative | Seat held | |
| Erewash | Conservative | Maggie Throup | Conservative | Seat held | |
| Erith and Thamesmead | Labour | Teresa Pearce | Labour | Seat held | |
| Esher and Walton | Conservative | Dominic Raab | Conservative | Seat held | |
| Exeter | Labour | Ben Bradshaw | Labour | Seat held | |
| Falkirk | Scottish National | John McNally | Scottish National | Seat held | |
| Fareham | Conservative | Suella Braverman | Conservative | Seat held | |
| Faversham and Mid Kent | Conservative | Helen Whately | Conservative | Seat held | |
| Feltham and Heston | Labour Co-operative | Seema Malhotra | Labour Co-operative | Seat held | |
| Fermanagh and South Tyrone | UUP | Michelle Gildernew | Sinn Féin | Seat gain, defeated incumbent Tom Elliott | |
| Filton and Bradley Stoke | Conservative | Jack Lopresti | Conservative | Seat held | |
| Finchley and Golders Green | Conservative | Mike Freer | Conservative | Seat held | |
| Folkestone and Hythe | Conservative | Damian Collins | Conservative | Seat held | |
| Forest of Dean | Conservative | Mark Harper | Conservative | Seat held | |
| Foyle | SDLP | Elisha McCallion | Sinn Féin | Seat gain, defeated incumbent Mark Durkan | |
| Fylde | Conservative | Mark Menzies | Conservative | Seat held | |
| Gainsborough | Conservative | Edward Leigh | Conservative | Seat held | |
| Garston and Halewood | Labour | Maria Eagle | Labour | Seat held | |
| Gateshead | Labour | Ian Mearns | Labour | Seat held | |
| Gedling | Labour | Vernon Coaker | Labour | Seat held | |
| Gillingham and Rainham | Conservative | Rehman Chishti | Conservative | Seat held | |
| Glasgow Central | Scottish National | Alison Thewliss | Scottish National | Seat held | |
| Glasgow East | Independent | David Linden | Scottish National | Seat held, incumbent Natalie McGarry (originally an SNP MP) stood down | |
| Glasgow North | Scottish National | Patrick Grady | Scottish National | Seat held | |
| Glasgow North East | Scottish National | Paul Sweeney | Labour Co-operative | Seat gain, defeated incumbent Anne McLaughlin | Account manager at Scottish Enterprise, Production engineer at BAE Systems |
| Glasgow North West | Scottish National | Carol Monaghan | Scottish National | Seat held | |
| Glasgow South | Scottish National | Stewart McDonald | Scottish National | Seat held | |
| Glasgow South West | Scottish National | Chris Stephens | Scottish National | Seat held | |
| Glenrothes | Scottish National | Peter Grant | Scottish National | Seat held | |
| Gloucester | Conservative | Richard Graham | Conservative | Seat held | |
| Gordon | Scottish National | Colin Clark | Conservative | Seat gain, defeated incumbent Alex Salmond | |
| Gosport | Conservative | Caroline Dinenage | Conservative | Seat held | |
| Gower | Conservative | Tonia Antoniazzi | Labour | Seat gain, defeated incumbent Byron Davies | |
| Grantham and Stamford | Conservative | Nicholas Boles | Conservative | Seat held | |
| Gravesham | Conservative | Adam Holloway | Conservative | Seat held | |
| Great Grimsby | Labour | Melanie Onn | Labour | Seat held | |
| Great Yarmouth | Conservative | Brandon Lewis | Conservative | Seat held | |
| Greenwich and Woolwich | Labour | Matthew Pennycook | Labour | Seat held | |
| Guildford | Conservative | Anne Milton | Conservative | Seat held | |
| Hackney North and Stoke Newington | Labour | Diane Abbott | Labour | Seat held | |
| Hackney South and Shoreditch | Labour Co-operative | Meg Hillier | Labour Co-operative | Seat held | |
| Halesowen and Rowley Regis | Conservative | James Morris | Conservative | Seat held | |
| Halifax | Labour | Holly Lynch | Labour | Seat held | |
| Haltemprice and Howden | Conservative | David Davis | Conservative | Seat held | |
| Halton | Labour | Derek Twigg | Labour | Seat held | |
| Hammersmith | Labour | Andy Slaughter | Labour | Seat held | |
| Hampstead and Kilburn | Labour | Tulip Siddiq | Labour | Seat held | |
| Harborough | Conservative | Neil O'Brien | Conservative | Seat held, incumbent Sir Edward Garnier stood down | |
| Harlow | Conservative | Robert Halfon | Conservative | Seat held | |
| Harrogate and Knaresborough | Conservative | Andrew Jones | Conservative | Seat held | |
| Harrow East | Conservative | Bob Blackman | Conservative | Seat held | |
| Harrow West | Labour Co-operative | Gareth Thomas | Labour Co-operative | Seat held | |
| Hartlepool | Labour | Mike Hill | Labour | Seat held, incumbent Iain Wright stood down | |
| Harwich and North Essex | Conservative | Bernard Jenkin | Conservative | Seat held | |
| Hastings and Rye | Conservative | Amber Rudd | Conservative | Seat held | |
| Havant | Conservative | Alan Mak | Conservative | Seat held | |
| Hayes and Harlington | Labour | John McDonnell | Labour | Seat held | |
| Hazel Grove | Conservative | William Wragg | Conservative | Seat held | |
| Hemel Hempstead | Conservative | Mike Penning | Conservative | Seat held | |
| Hemsworth | Labour | Jon Trickett | Labour | Seat held | |
| Hendon | Conservative | Matthew Offord | Conservative | Seat held | |
| Henley | Conservative | John Howell | Conservative | Seat held | |
| Hereford and South Herefordshire | Conservative | Jesse Norman | Conservative | Seat held | |
| Hertford and Stortford | Conservative | Mark Prisk | Conservative | Seat held | |
| Hertsmere | Conservative | Oliver Dowden | Conservative | Seat held | |
| Hexham | Conservative | Guy Opperman | Conservative | Seat held | |
| Heywood and Middleton | Labour | Liz McInnes | Labour | Seat held | |
| High Peak | Conservative | Ruth George | Labour | Seat gain, defeated incumbent Andrew Bingham | |
| Hitchin and Harpenden | Conservative | Bim Afolami | Conservative | Seat held, incumbent Peter Lilley stood down | |
| Holborn and St Pancras | Labour | Keir Starmer | Labour | Seat held | |
| Hornchurch and Upminster | Conservative | Julia Lopez | Conservative | Seat held, incumbent Angela Watkinson stood down | |
| Hornsey and Wood Green | Labour | Catherine West | Labour | Seat held | |
| Horsham | Conservative | Jeremy Quin | Conservative | Seat held | |
| Houghton and Sunderland South | Labour | Bridget Phillipson | Labour | Seat held | |
| Hove | Labour | Peter Kyle | Labour | Seat held | |
| Huddersfield | Labour Co-operative | Barry Sheerman | Labour Co-operative | Seat held | |
| Huntingdon | Conservative | Jonathan Djanogly | Conservative | Seat held | |
| Hyndburn | Labour | Graham Jones | Labour | Seat held | |
| Ilford North | Labour | Wes Streeting | Labour | Seat held | |
| Ilford South | Labour Co-operative | Mike Gapes | Labour Co-operative | Seat held | |
| Inverclyde | Scottish National | Ronnie Cowan | Scottish National | Seat held | |
| Inverness, Nairn, Badenoch and Strathspey | Scottish National | Drew Hendry | Scottish National | Seat held | |
| Ipswich | Conservative | Sandy Martin | Labour | Seat gain, defeated incumbent Ben Gummer | |
| Isle of Wight | Conservative | Bob Seely | Conservative | Seat held, incumbent Andrew Turner stood down | |
| Islington North | Labour | Jeremy Corbyn | Labour | Seat held | |
| Islington South and Finsbury | Labour | Emily Thornberry | Labour | Seat held | |
| Islwyn | Labour Co-operative | Chris Evans | Labour Co-operative | Seat held | |
| Jarrow | Labour | Stephen Hepburn | Labour | Seat held | |
| Keighley | Conservative | John Grogan | Labour | Seat gain, defeated incumbent Kris Hopkins | |
| Kenilworth and Southam | Conservative | Jeremy Wright | Conservative | Seat held | |
| Kensington | Conservative | Emma Dent Coad | Labour | Seat gain, defeated incumbent Victoria Borwick | |
| Kettering | Conservative | Philip Hollobone | Conservative | Seat held | |
| Kilmarnock and Loudoun | Scottish National | Alan Brown | Scottish National | Seat held | |
| Kingston and Surbiton | Conservative | Ed Davey | Liberal Democrats | Seat gain, defeated incumbent James Berry | |
| Kingston upon Hull East | Labour | Karl Turner | Labour | Seat held | |
| Kingston upon Hull North | Labour | Diana Johnson | Labour | Seat held | |
| Kingston upon Hull West and Hessle | Labour | Emma Hardy | Labour | Seat held, incumbent Alan Johnson stood down | |
| Kingswood | Conservative | Chris Skidmore | Conservative | Seat held | |
| Kirkcaldy and Cowdenbeath | Scottish National | Lesley Laird | Labour | Seat gain, defeated incumbent Roger Mullin | |
| Knowsley | Labour | George Howarth | Labour | Seat held | |
| Lagan Valley | DUP | Jeffrey Donaldson | DUP | Seat held | |
| Lanark and Hamilton East | Scottish National | Angela Crawley | Scottish National | Seat held | |
| Lancaster and Fleetwood | Labour | Cat Smith | Labour | Seat held | |
| Leeds Central | Labour | Hilary Benn | Labour | Seat held | |
| Leeds East | Labour | Richard Burgon | Labour | Seat held | |
| Leeds North East | Labour | Fabian Hamilton | Labour | Seat held | |
| Leeds North West | Liberal Democrats | Alex Sobel | Labour Co-operative | Seat gain, defeated incumbent Greg Mulholland | |
| Leeds West | Labour | Rachel Reeves | Labour | Seat held | |
| Leicester East | Labour | Keith Vaz | Labour | Seat held | |
| Leicester South | Labour Co-operative | Jon Ashworth | Labour Co-operative | Seat held | |
| Leicester West | Labour | Liz Kendall | Labour | Seat held | |
| Leigh | Labour | Jo Platt | Labour Co-operative | Seat held, incumbent Andy Burnham stood down | |
| Lewes | Conservative | Maria Caulfield | Conservative | Seat held | |
| Lewisham East | Labour | Heidi Alexander | Labour | Seat held | |
| Lewisham West and Penge | Labour | Ellie Reeves | Labour | Seat held, incumbent Jim Dowd stood down | |
| Lewisham Deptford | Labour | Vicky Foxcroft | Labour | Seat held | |
| Leyton and Wanstead | Labour | John Cryer | Labour | Seat held | |
| Lichfield | Conservative | Michael Fabricant | Conservative | Seat held | |
| Lincoln | Conservative | Karen Lee | Labour | Seat gain, defeated incumbent Karl McCartney | |
| Linlithgow and East Falkirk | Scottish National | Martyn Day | Scottish National | Seat held | |
| Liverpool Riverside | Labour Co-operative | Louise Ellman | Labour Co-operative | Seat held | |
| Liverpool Walton | Labour | Dan Carden | Labour | Seat held, incumbent Steve Rotheram stood down | |
| Liverpool Wavertree | Labour Co-operative | Luciana Berger | Labour Co-operative | Seat held | |
| Liverpool West Derby | Labour Co-operative | Stephen Twigg | Labour Co-operative | Seat held | |
| Livingston | Scottish National | Hannah Bardell | Scottish National | Seat held | |
| Llanelli | Labour | Nia Griffith | Labour | Seat held | |
| Loughborough | Conservative | Nicky Morgan | Conservative | Seat held | |
| Louth and Horncastle | Conservative | Victoria Atkins | Conservative | Seat held | |
| Ludlow | Conservative | Philip Dunne | Conservative | Seat held | |
| Luton North | Labour | Kelvin Hopkins | Labour | Seat held. Suspended from party. | |
| Luton South | Labour Co-operative | Gavin Shuker | Labour Co-operative | Seat held | |
| Macclesfield | Conservative | David Rutley | Conservative | Seat held | |
| Maidenhead | Conservative | Theresa May | Conservative | Seat held | |
| Maidstone and The Weald | Conservative | Helen Grant | Conservative | Seat held | |
| Makerfield | Labour | Yvonne Fovargue | Labour | Seat held | |
| Maldon | Conservative | John Whittingdale | Conservative | Seat held | |
| Manchester Central | Labour Co-operative | Lucy Powell | Labour Co-operative | Seat held | |
| Manchester, Gorton | Labour | Afzal Khan | Labour | Seat held, last MP Sir Gerald Kaufman died in February 2017 | |
| Manchester Withington | Labour | Jeff Smith | Labour | Seat held | |
| Mansfield | Labour | Ben Bradley | Conservative | Seat gain, defeated incumbent Sir Alan Meale | |
| Meon Valley | Conservative | George Hollingbery | Conservative | Seat held | |
| Meriden | Conservative | Caroline Spelman | Conservative | Seat held | |
| Merthyr Tydfil and Rhymney | Labour | Gerald Jones | Labour | Seat held | |
| Mid Bedfordshire | Conservative | Nadine Dorries | Conservative | Seat held | |
| Mid Derbyshire | Conservative | Pauline Latham | Conservative | Seat held | |
| Mid Dorset and North Poole | Conservative | Michael Tomlinson | Conservative | Seat held | |
| Mid Norfolk | Conservative | George Freeman | Conservative | Seat held | |
| Mid Sussex | Conservative | Nicholas Soames | Conservative | Seat held | |
| Mid Ulster | Sinn Féin | Francie Molloy | Sinn Féin | Seat held | |
| Mid Worcestershire | Conservative | Nigel Huddleston | Conservative | Seat held | |
| Middlesbrough | Labour | Andy McDonald | Labour | Seat held | |
| Middlesbrough South and East Cleveland | Labour | Simon Clarke | Conservative | Seat gain, incumbent Tom Blenkinsop stood down | |
| Midlothian | Scottish National | Danielle Rowley | Labour | Seat gain, defeated incumbent Owen Thompson | |
| Milton Keynes North | Conservative | Mark Lancaster | Conservative | Seat held | |
| Milton Keynes South | Conservative | Iain Stewart | Conservative | Seat held | |
| Mitcham and Morden | Labour | Siobhain McDonagh | Labour | Seat held | |
| Mole Valley | Conservative | Sir Paul Beresford | Conservative | Seat held | |
| Monmouth | Conservative | David Davies | Conservative | Seat held | |
| Montgomeryshire | Conservative | Glyn Davies | Conservative | Seat held | |
| Moray | Scottish National | Douglas Ross | Conservative | Seat gain, defeated incumbent Angus Robertson | |
| Morecambe and Lunesdale | Conservative | David Morris | Conservative | Seat held | |
| Morley and Outwood | Conservative | Andrea Jenkyns | Conservative | Seat held | |
| Motherwell and Wishaw | Scottish National | Marion Fellows | Scottish National | Seat held | |
| Na h-Eileanan an Iar (Western Isles) | Scottish National | Angus MacNeil | Scottish National | Seat held | |
| Neath | Labour Co-operative | Christina Rees | Labour Co-operative | Seat held | |
| New Forest East | Conservative | Julian Lewis | Conservative | Seat held | |
| New Forest West | Conservative | Desmond Swayne | Conservative | Seat held | |
| Newark | Conservative | Robert Jenrick | Conservative | Seat held | |
| Newbury | Conservative | Richard Benyon | Conservative | Seat held | |
| Newcastle upon Tyne Central | Labour | Chinyelu Onwurah | Labour | Seat held | |
| Newcastle upon Tyne East | Labour | Nick Brown | Labour | Seat held | |
| Newcastle upon Tyne North | Labour | Catherine McKinnell | Labour | Seat held | |
| Newcastle-under-Lyme | Labour | Paul Farrelly | Labour | Seat held | |
| Newport East | Labour | Jessica Morden | Labour | Seat held | |
| Newport West | Labour | Paul Flynn | Labour | Seat held | |
| Newry and Armagh | Sinn Féin | Mickey Brady | Sinn Féin | Seat held | |
| Newton Abbot | Conservative | Anne Marie Morris | Conservative | Seat held | |
| Normanton, Pontefract and Castleford | Labour | Yvette Cooper | Labour | Seat held | |
| North Antrim | DUP | Ian Paisley Jr | DUP | Seat held | |
| North Ayrshire and Arran | Scottish National | Patricia Gibson | Scottish National | Seat held | |
| North Cornwall | Conservative | Scott Mann | Conservative | Seat held | |
| North Devon | Conservative | Peter Heaton-Jones | Conservative | Seat held | |
| North Dorset | Conservative | Simon Hoare | Conservative | Seat held | |
| North Down | Independent | Lady Sylvia Hermon | Independent | Seat held | |
| North Durham | Labour | Kevan Jones | Labour | Seat held | |
| North East Bedfordshire | Conservative | Alistair Burt | Conservative | Seat held | |
| North East Cambridgeshire | Conservative | Steve Barclay | Conservative | Seat held | |
| North East Derbyshire | Labour | Lee Rowley | Conservative | Seat gain, defeated incumbent Natascha Engel | |
| North East Fife | Scottish National | Stephen Gethins | Scottish National | Seat held | |
| North East Hampshire | Conservative | Ranil Jayawardena | Conservative | Seat held | |
| North East Hertfordshire | Conservative | Oliver Heald | Conservative | Seat held | |
| North East Somerset | Conservative | Jacob Rees-Mogg | Conservative | Seat held | |
| North Herefordshire | Conservative | Bill Wiggin | Conservative | Seat held | |
| North Norfolk | Liberal Democrats | Norman Lamb | Liberal Democrats | Seat held | |
| North Shropshire | Conservative | Owen Paterson | Conservative | Seat held | |
| North Somerset | Conservative | Liam Fox | Conservative | Seat held | |
| North Swindon | Conservative | Justin Tomlinson | Conservative | Seat held | |
| North Thanet | Conservative | Roger Gale | Conservative | Seat held | |
| North Tyneside | Labour | Mary Glindon | Labour | Seat held | |
| North Warwickshire | Conservative | Craig Tracey | Conservative | Seat held | |
| North West Cambridgeshire | Conservative | Shailesh Vara | Conservative | Seat held | |
| North West Durham | Labour | Laura Pidcock | Labour | Seat held, incumbent Pat Glass stood down | |
| North West Hampshire | Conservative | Kit Malthouse | Conservative | Seat held | |
| North West Leicestershire | Conservative | Andrew Bridgen | Conservative | Seat held | |
| North West Norfolk | Conservative | Sir Henry Bellingham | Conservative | Seat held | |
| North Wiltshire | Conservative | James Gray | Conservative | Seat held | |
| Northampton North | Conservative | Michael Ellis | Conservative | Seat held | |
| Northampton South | Conservative | Andrew Lewer | Conservative | Seat held, incumbent David Mackintosh stood down | |
| Norwich North | Conservative | Chloe Smith | Conservative | Seat held | |
| Norwich South | Labour | Clive Lewis | Labour | Seat held | |
| Nottingham East | Labour Co-operative | Chris Leslie | Labour Co-operative | Seat held | |
| Nottingham North | Labour | Alex Norris | Labour Co-operative | Seat held, incumbent Graham Allen stood down | |
| Nottingham South | Labour | Lilian Greenwood | Labour | Seat held | |
| Nuneaton | Conservative | Marcus Jones | Conservative | Seat held | |
| Ochil and South Perthshire | Scottish National | Luke Graham | Conservative | Seat gain, defeated incumbent Tasmina Ahmed-Sheikh | |
| Ogmore | Labour | Chris Elmore | Labour | Seat held | |
| Old Bexley and Sidcup | Conservative | James Brokenshire | Conservative | Seat held | |
| Oldham East and Saddleworth | Labour | Debbie Abrahams | Labour | Seat held | |
| Oldham West and Royton | Labour Co-operative | Jim McMahon | Labour Co-operative | Seat held | |
| Orkney and Shetland | Liberal Democrats | Alistair Carmichael | Liberal Democrats | Seat held | |
| Orpington | Conservative | Jo Johnson | Conservative | Seat held | |
| Oxford East | Labour | Anneliese Dodds | Labour Co-operative | Seat held, incumbent Andrew Smith stood down | |
| Oxford West and Abingdon | Conservative | Layla Moran | Liberal Democrats | Seat gain, defeated incumbent Nicola Blackwood | |
| Paisley and Renfrewshire North | Scottish National | Gavin Newlands | Scottish National | Seat held | |
| Paisley and Renfrewshire South | Scottish National | Mhairi Black | Scottish National | Seat held | |
| Pendle | Conservative | Andrew Stephenson | Conservative | Seat held | |
| Penistone and Stocksbridge | Labour | Angela Christine Smith | Labour | Seat held | |
| Penrith and The Border | Conservative | Rory Stewart | Conservative | Seat held | |
| Perth and North Perthshire | Scottish National | Pete Wishart | Scottish National | Seat held | |
| Peterborough | Conservative | Fiona Onasanya | Labour | Seat gain, defeated incumbent Stewart Jackson | |
| Plymouth, Moor View | Conservative | Johnny Mercer | Conservative | Seat held | |
| Plymouth, Sutton and Devonport | Conservative | Luke Pollard | Labour Co-operative | Seat gain, defeated incumbent Oliver Colvile | |
| Pontypridd | Labour | Owen Smith | Labour | Seat held | |
| Poole | Conservative | Robert Syms | Conservative | Seat held | |
| Poplar and Limehouse | Labour | Jim Fitzpatrick | Labour | Seat held | |
| Portsmouth North | Conservative | Penny Mordaunt | Conservative | Seat held | |
| Portsmouth South | Conservative | Stephen Morgan | Labour | Seat gain, defeated incumbent Flick Drummond | |
| Preseli Pembrokeshire | Conservative | Stephen Crabb | Conservative | Seat held | |
| Preston | Labour Co-operative | Mark Hendrick | Labour Co-operative | Seat held | |
| Pudsey | Conservative | Stuart Andrew | Conservative | Seat held | |
| Putney | Conservative | Justine Greening | Conservative | Seat held | |
| Rayleigh and Wickford | Conservative | Mark Francois | Conservative | Seat held | |
| Reading East | Conservative | Matt Rodda | Labour | Seat gain, defeated incumbent Rob Wilson | |
| Reading West | Conservative | Alok Sharma | Conservative | Seat held | |
| Redcar | Labour Co-operative | Anna Turley | Labour Co-operative | Seat held | |
| Redditch | Conservative | Rachel Maclean | Conservative | Seat held, incumbent Karen Lumley stood down | |
| Reigate | Conservative | Crispin Blunt | Conservative | Seat held | |
| Rhondda | Labour | Chris Bryant | Labour | Seat held | |
| Ribble Valley | Conservative | Nigel Evans | Conservative | Seat held | |
| Richmond (Yorks) | Conservative | Rishi Sunak | Conservative | Seat held | |
| Richmond Park | Liberal Democrats | Zac Goldsmith | Conservative | Seat recovery, defeated incumbent Sarah Olney | |
| Rochdale | Independent | Tony Lloyd | Labour | Seat held, defeated incumbent Simon Danczuk (originally a Labour MP) | |
| Rochester and Strood | Conservative | Kelly Tolhurst | Conservative | Seat held | |
| Rochford and Southend East | Conservative | James Duddridge | Conservative | Seat held | |
| Romford | Conservative | Andrew Rosindell | Conservative | Seat held | |
| Romsey and Southampton North | Conservative | Caroline Nokes | Conservative | Seat held | |
| Ross, Skye and Lochaber | Scottish National | Ian Blackford | Scottish National | Seat held | |
| Rossendale and Darwen | Conservative | Jake Berry | Conservative | Seat held | |
| Rother Valley | Labour | Kevin Barron | Labour | Seat held | |
| Rotherham | Labour | Sarah Champion | Labour | Seat held | |
| Rugby | Conservative | Mark Pawsey | Conservative | Seat held | |
| Ruislip, Northwood and Pinner | Conservative | Nick Hurd | Conservative | Seat held | |
| Runnymede and Weybridge | Conservative | Philip Hammond | Conservative | Seat held | |
| Rushcliffe | Conservative | Kenneth Clarke | Conservative | Seat held | |
| Rutherglen and Hamilton West | Scottish National | Ged Killen | Labour Co-operative | Seat gain, defeated incumbent Margaret Ferrier | |
| Rutland and Melton | Conservative | Alan Duncan | Conservative | Seat held | |
| Saffron Walden | Conservative | Kemi Badenoch | Conservative | Seat held, incumbent Sir Alan Haselhurst stood down | |
| Salford and Eccles | Labour | Rebecca Long-Bailey | Labour | Seat held | |
| Salisbury | Conservative | John Glen | Conservative | Seat held | |
| Scarborough and Whitby | Conservative | Robert Goodwill | Conservative | Seat held | |
| Scunthorpe | Labour | Nic Dakin | Labour | Seat held | |
| Sedgefield | Labour | Phil Wilson | Labour | Seat held | |
| Sefton Central | Labour | Bill Esterson | Labour | Seat held | |
| Selby and Ainsty | Conservative | Nigel Adams | Conservative | Seat held | |
| Sevenoaks | Conservative | Michael Fallon | Conservative | Seat held | |
| Sheffield Central | Labour | Paul Blomfield | Labour | Seat held | |
| Sheffield South East | Labour | Clive Betts | Labour | Seat held | |
| Sheffield Brightside and Hillsborough | Labour | Gill Furniss | Labour | Seat held | |
| Sheffield Hallam | Liberal Democrats | Jared O'Mara | Labour | Seat gain, defeated incumbent Nick Clegg. | |
| Sheffield Heeley | Labour | Louise Haigh | Labour | Seat held | |
| Sherwood | Conservative | Mark Spencer | Conservative | Seat held | |
| Shipley | Conservative | Philip Davies | Conservative | Seat held | |
| Shrewsbury and Atcham | Conservative | Daniel Kawczynski | Conservative | Seat held | |
| Sittingbourne and Sheppey | Conservative | Gordon Henderson | Conservative | Seat held | |
| Skipton and Ripon | Conservative | Julian Smith | Conservative | Seat held | |
| Sleaford and North Hykeham | Conservative | Caroline Johnson | Conservative | Seat held | |
| Slough | Labour | Tan Dhesi | Labour | Seat held, incumbent Fiona Mactaggart stood down | |
| Solihull | Conservative | Julian Knight | Conservative | Seat held | |
| Somerton and Frome | Conservative | David Warburton | Conservative | Seat held | |
| South Antrim | UUP | Paul Girvan | DUP | Seat gain, defeated incumbent Danny Kinahan | |
| South Basildon and East Thurrock | Conservative | Stephen Metcalfe | Conservative | Seat held | |
| South Cambridgeshire | Conservative | Heidi Allen | Conservative | Seat held | |
| South Derbyshire | Conservative | Heather Wheeler | Conservative | Seat held | |
| South Dorset | Conservative | Richard Drax | Conservative | Seat held | |
| South Down | SDLP | Chris Hazzard | Sinn Féin | Seat gain, defeated incumbent Margaret Ritchie | |
| South East Cambridgeshire | Conservative | Lucy Frazer | Conservative | Seat held | |
| South East Cornwall | Conservative | Sheryll Murray | Conservative | Seat held | |
| South Holland and The Deepings | Conservative | John Hayes | Conservative | Seat held | |
| South Leicestershire | Conservative | Alberto Costa | Conservative | Seat held | |
| South Norfolk | Conservative | Richard Bacon | Conservative | Seat held | |
| South Northamptonshire | Conservative | Andrea Leadsom | Conservative | Seat held | |
| South Ribble | Conservative | Seema Kennedy | Conservative | Seat held | |
| South Shields | Labour | Emma Lewell-Buck | Labour | Seat held | |
| South Staffordshire | Conservative | Gavin Williamson | Conservative | Seat held | |
| South Suffolk | Conservative | James Cartlidge | Conservative | Seat held | |
| South Swindon | Conservative | Robert Buckland | Conservative | Seat held | |
| South Thanet | Conservative | Craig Mackinlay | Conservative | Seat held | |
| South West Bedfordshire | Conservative | Andrew Selous | Conservative | Seat held | |
| South West Devon | Conservative | Gary Streeter | Conservative | Seat held | |
| South West Hertfordshire | Conservative | David Gauke | Conservative | Seat held | |
| South West Norfolk | Conservative | Liz Truss | Conservative | Seat held | |
| South West Surrey | Conservative | Jeremy Hunt | Conservative | Seat held | |
| South West Wiltshire | Conservative | Andrew Murrison | Conservative | Seat held | |
| Southampton Itchen | Conservative | Royston Smith | Conservative | Seat held | |
| Southampton Test | Labour | Alan Whitehead | Labour | Seat held | |
| Southend West | Conservative | David Amess | Conservative | Seat held | |
| Southport | Liberal Democrats | Damien Moore | Conservative | Seat gain, incumbent John Pugh stood down | |
| Spelthorne | Conservative | Kwasi Kwarteng | Conservative | Seat held | |
| St Albans | Conservative | Anne Main | Conservative | Seat held | |
| St Austell and Newquay | Conservative | Steve Double | Conservative | Seat held | |
| St Helens North | Labour | Conor McGinn | Labour | Seat held | |
| St Helens South and Whiston | Labour | Marie Rimmer | Labour | Seat held | |
| St Ives | Conservative | Derek Thomas | Conservative | Seat held | |
| Stafford | Conservative | Jeremy Lefroy | Conservative | Seat held | |
| Staffordshire Moorlands | Conservative | Karen Bradley | Conservative | Seat held | |
| Stalybridge and Hyde | Labour Co-operative | Jonathan Reynolds | Labour Co-operative | Seat held | |
| Stevenage | Conservative | Stephen McPartland | Conservative | Seat held | |
| Stirling | Scottish National | Stephen Kerr | Conservative | Seat gain, defeated incumbent Steven Paterson | |
| Stockport | Labour | Ann Coffey | Labour | Seat held | |
| Stockton North | Labour | Alex Cunningham | Labour | Seat held | |
| Stockton South | Conservative | Paul Williams | Labour | Seat gain, defeated incumbent James Wharton | |
| Stoke-on-Trent Central | Labour Co-operative | Gareth Snell | Labour Co-operative | Seat held | |
| Stoke-on-Trent North | Labour | Ruth Smeeth | Labour | Seat held | |
| Stoke-on-Trent South | Labour | Jack Brereton | Conservative | Seat gain, defeated incumbent Rob Flello | |
| Stone | Conservative | Bill Cash | Conservative | Seat held | |
| Stourbridge | Conservative | Margot James | Conservative | Seat held | |
| Strangford | DUP | Jim Shannon | DUP | Seat held | |
| Stratford-on-Avon | Conservative | Nadhim Zahawi | Conservative | Seat held | |
| Streatham | Labour | Chuka Umunna | Labour | Seat held | |
| Stretford and Urmston | Labour | Kate Green | Labour | Seat held | |
| Stroud | Conservative | David Drew | Labour Co-operative | Seat gain, defeated incumbent Neil Carmichael | |
| Suffolk Coastal | Conservative | Thérèse Coffey | Conservative | Seat held | |
| Sunderland Central | Labour | Julie Elliott | Labour | Seat held | |
| Surrey Heath | Conservative | Michael Gove | Conservative | Seat held | |
| Sutton and Cheam | Conservative | Paul Scully | Conservative | Seat held | |
| Sutton Coldfield | Conservative | Andrew Mitchell | Conservative | Seat held | |
| Swansea East | Labour | Carolyn Harris | Labour | Seat held | |
| Swansea West | Labour Co-operative | Geraint Davies | Labour Co-operative | Seat held | |
| Tamworth | Conservative | Christopher Pincher | Conservative | Seat held | |
| Tatton | Conservative | Esther McVey | Conservative | Seat held, incumbent George Osborne stood down | |
| Taunton Deane | Conservative | Rebecca Pow | Conservative | Seat held | |
| Telford | Conservative | Lucy Allan | Conservative | Seat held | |
| Tewkesbury | Conservative | Laurence Robertson | Conservative | Seat held | |
| Thirsk and Malton | Conservative | Kevin Hollinrake | Conservative | Seat held | |
| Thornbury and Yate | Conservative | Luke Hall | Conservative | Seat held | |
| Thurrock | Conservative | Jackie Doyle-Price | Conservative | Seat held | |
| Tiverton and Honiton | Conservative | Neil Parish | Conservative | Seat held | |
| Tonbridge and Malling | Conservative | Tom Tugendhat | Conservative | Seat held | |
| Tooting | Labour | Rosena Allin-Khan | Labour | Seat held | |
| Torbay | Conservative | Kevin Foster | Conservative | Seat held | |
| Torfaen | Labour | Nick Thomas-Symonds | Labour | Seat held | |
| Torridge and West Devon | Conservative | Geoffrey Cox | Conservative | Seat held | |
| Totnes | Conservative | Sarah Wollaston | Conservative | Seat held | |
| Tottenham | Labour | David Lammy | Labour | Seat held | |
| Truro and Falmouth | Conservative | Sarah Newton | Conservative | Seat held | |
| Tunbridge Wells | Conservative | Greg Clark | Conservative | Seat held | |
| Twickenham | Conservative | Vince Cable | Liberal Democrats | Seat gain, defeated incumbent Tania Mathias | |
| Tynemouth | Labour | Alan Campbell | Labour | Seat held | |
| Upper Bann | DUP | David Simpson | DUP | Seat held | |
| Uxbridge and South Ruislip | Conservative | Boris Johnson | Conservative | Seat held | |
| Vale of Clwyd | Conservative | Chris Ruane | Labour | Seat gain, defeated incumbent James Davies | |
| Vale of Glamorgan | Conservative | Alun Cairns | Conservative | Seat held | |
| Vauxhall | Labour | Kate Hoey | Labour | Seat held | |
| Wakefield | Labour | Mary Creagh | Labour | Seat held | |
| Wallasey | Labour | Angela Eagle | Labour | Seat held | |
| Walsall North | Labour | Eddie Hughes | Conservative | Seat gain, defeated incumbent David Winnick | |
| Walsall South | Labour | Valerie Vaz | Labour | Seat held | |
| Walthamstow | Labour Co-operative | Stella Creasy | Labour Co-operative | Seat held | |
| Wansbeck | Labour | Ian Lavery | Labour | Seat held | |
| Wantage | Conservative | Ed Vaizey | Conservative | Seat held | |
| Warley | Labour | John Spellar | Labour | Seat held | |
| Warrington North | Labour | Helen Jones | Labour | Seat held | |
| Warrington South | Conservative | Faisal Rashid | Labour | Seat gain, defeated incumbent David Mowat | |
| Warwick and Leamington | Conservative | Matt Western | Labour | Seat gain, defeated incumbent Chris White | |
| Washington and Sunderland West | Labour | Sharon Hodgson | Labour | Seat held | |
| Watford | Conservative | Richard Harrington | Conservative | Seat held | |
| Waveney | Conservative | Peter Aldous | Conservative | Seat held | |
| Wealden | Conservative | Nus Ghani | Conservative | Seat held | |
| Weaver Vale | Conservative | Mike Amesbury | Labour | Seat gain, defeated incumbent Graham Evans | |
| Wellingborough | Conservative | Peter Bone | Conservative | Seat held | |
| Wells | Conservative | James Heappey | Conservative | Seat held | |
| Welwyn Hatfield | Conservative | Grant Shapps | Conservative | Seat held | |
| Wentworth and Dearne | Labour | John Healey | Labour | Seat held | |
| West Aberdeenshire and Kincardine | Scottish National | Andrew Bowie | Conservative | Seat gain, defeated incumbent Stuart Donaldson | |
| West Bromwich East | Labour | Tom Watson | Labour | Seat held | |
| West Bromwich West | Labour Co-operative | Adrian Bailey | Labour Co-operative | Seat held | |
| West Dorset | Conservative | Oliver Letwin | Conservative | Seat held | |
| West Dunbartonshire | Scottish National | Martin Docherty | Scottish National | Seat held | |
| West Ham | Labour | Lyn Brown | Labour | Seat held | |
| West Lancashire | Labour | Rosie Cooper | Labour | Seat held | |
| West Suffolk | Conservative | Matthew Hancock | Conservative | Seat held | |
| West Tyrone | Sinn Féin | Barry McElduff | Sinn Féin | Seat held, incumbent Pat Doherty stood down | |
| West Worcestershire | Conservative | Harriett Baldwin | Conservative | Seat held | |
| Westminster North | Labour | Karen Buck | Labour | Seat held | |
| Westmorland and Lonsdale | Liberal Democrats | Tim Farron | Liberal Democrats | Seat held | |
| Weston-super-Mare | Conservative | John Penrose | Conservative | Seat held | |
| Wigan | Labour | Lisa Nandy | Labour | Seat held | |
| Wimbledon | Conservative | Stephen Hammond | Conservative | Seat held | |
| Winchester | Conservative | Steve Brine | Conservative | Seat held | |
| Windsor | Conservative | Adam Afriyie | Conservative | Seat held | |
| Wirral South | Labour | Alison McGovern | Labour | Seat held | |
| Wirral West | Labour | Margaret Greenwood | Labour | Seat held | |
| Witham | Conservative | Priti Patel | Conservative | Seat held | |
| Witney | Conservative | Robert Courts | Conservative | Seat held | |
| Woking | Conservative | Jonathan Lord | Conservative | Seat held | |
| Wokingham | Conservative | John Redwood | Conservative | Seat held | |
| Wolverhampton North East | Labour | Emma Reynolds | Labour | Seat held | |
| Wolverhampton South East | Labour | Pat McFadden | Labour | Seat held | |
| Wolverhampton South West | Labour | Eleanor Smith | Labour | Seat held, incumbent Rob Marris stood down | |
| Worcester | Conservative | Robin Walker | Conservative | Seat held | |
| Workington | Labour | Sue Hayman | Labour | Seat held | |
| Worsley and Eccles South | Labour | Barbara Keeley | Labour | Seat held | |
| Worthing West | Conservative | Peter Bottomley | Conservative | Seat held | |
| The Wrekin | Conservative | Mark Pritchard | Conservative | Seat held | |
| Wrexham | Labour | Ian Lucas | Labour | Seat held | |
| Wycombe | Conservative | Steve Baker | Conservative | Seat held | |
| Wyre and Preston North | Conservative | Ben Wallace | Conservative | Seat held | |
| Wyre Forest | Conservative | Mark Garnier | Conservative | Seat held | |
| Wythenshawe and Sale East | Labour | Mike Kane | Labour | Seat held | |
| Yeovil | Conservative | Marcus Fysh | Conservative | Seat held | |
| Ynys Môn (Anglesey) | Labour | Albert Owen | Labour | Seat held | |
| York Central | Labour Co-operative | Rachael Maskell | Labour Co-operative | Seat held | |
| York Outer | Conservative | Julian Sturdy | Conservative | Seat held | |

=== Deputy Speakers ===
The Speaker nominated Sir David Amess (Conservative, Southend West) and George Howarth (Labour, Knowsley) to serve as Temporary Deputy Speakers until the Deputy Speakers had been elected. The election of Deputy Speakers took place on 28 June 2017.

Although Deputy Speakers do not resign from their parties, they cease to vote (except to break ties) and they do not participate in party-political activity until the next election.

| Name | Party | Constituency | Office |
|---|---|---|---|
| Sir Lindsay Hoyle | Labour | Chorley | Chairman of Ways and Means |
| Eleanor Laing | Conservative | Epping Forest | First Deputy Chairman of Ways and Means |
| Dame Rosie Winterton | Labour | Doncaster Central | Second Deputy Chairman of Ways and Means |

As the only contesting member from the government side, Eleanor Laing's name did not appear on the ballot paper, and she was duly declared First Deputy Chairman of Ways and Means.

When Sir Lindsay Hoyle was elected Speaker on 4 November 2019 in succession to John Bercow, the post of Chairman of Ways and Means (one of the Deputy Speakers) became vacant and remained so when Parliament was dissolved on 6 November.

=== By-elections ===
By-elections are held for seats that become vacant.

| By-election | Date | Incumbent | Party | Cause | Winner | Party |
|---|---|---|---|---|---|---|
| West Tyrone | 3 May 2018 | Barry McElduff | Sinn Féin | Resignation after a social media post he made caused controversy regarding perceived sectarianism on the Kingsmill massacre | Órfhlaith Begley | Sinn Féin |
| West Tyrone | 3 May 2018 | Barry McElduff | Independent | Resignation after a social media post he made caused controversy regarding perceived sectarianism on the Kingsmill massacre | Órfhlaith Begley | Sinn Féin |
| Lewisham East | 14 June 2018 | Heidi Alexander | Labour | Resignation on appointment as Deputy Mayor of London | Janet Daby | Labour |
| Newport West | 4 April 2019 | Paul Flynn | Labour | Death | Ruth Jones | Labour |
| Peterborough | 6 June 2019 | Fiona Onasanya | Labour | Removed by recall petition after a conviction of perverting the course of justice. | Lisa Forbes | Labour |
| Peterborough | 6 June 2019 | Fiona Onasanya | Independent | Removed by recall petition after a conviction of perverting the course of justice. | Lisa Forbes | Labour |
| Brecon and Radnorshire | 1 August 2019 | Chris Davies | Conservative | Removed by recall petition after conviction of false expenses claims. | Jane Dodds | Liberal Democrats |

John Mann vacated the seat for Bassetlaw on 28 October 2019, and the Speaker John Bercow vacated his Buckingham seat on 4 November 2019. The seats remained vacant until dissolution and the election of new MPs in the general election on 12 December 2019.

== Defections and suspensions ==
The label under which MPs sit in the House of Commons can change if they leave or are suspended from or expelled by their party. When suspended, they effectively become independents. This Parliament has had an unusually large number of these changes, resulting in the number of MPs sitting as independents rising to its highest level (33) since the Ballot Act 1872 (which introduced secret ballots for elections in the United Kingdom).

The Conservative and Labour parties lost numerous MPs through suspensions and defections to other parties. In February 2019, 8 Labour and 3 Conservative MPs formed a new grouping (later a party in its own right), Change UK. That grouping experienced a split in June, with some of its members resigning to form The Independents. The Liberal Democrats have made a gain of 8 seats since the opening of Parliament, including some former Change UK members. The government lost its majority on 3 September 2019, when the Conservative MP Phillip Lee defected to the Liberal Democrats. Later the same day, the Conservatives expelled 21 of their MPs for voting against the government, 10 of whom were later readmitted to the party on 29 October.

| Name | Date | From | To | Constituency | Reason |
|---|---|---|---|---|---|
| Anne Marie Morris | 10 July 2017 | Conservative | Independent | Newton Abbot | Suspended from the Conservatives, pending investigation over using the remark "nigger in the woodpile". |
| Anne Marie Morris | 12 December 2017 | Independent | Conservative | Newton Abbot | Reinstated. |
| Jared O'Mara | 25 October 2017 | Labour | Independent | Sheffield Hallam | Suspended from Labour, pending investigation over alleged sexist and homophobic remarks. |
| Jared O'Mara | 3 July 2018 | Independent | Labour | Sheffield Hallam | Reinstated. |
| Jared O'Mara | 12 July 2018 | Labour | Independent | Sheffield Hallam | Resigned from Labour. |
| Kelvin Hopkins | 2 November 2017 | Labour | Independent | Luton North | Suspended from Labour, pending investigation into sexual allegations. |
| Charlie Elphicke | 3 November 2017 | Conservative | Independent | Dover | Suspended from the Conservatives, pending police investigation of "serious allegations". |
| Charlie Elphicke | 12 December 2018 | Independent | Conservative | Dover | Reinstated. |
| Charlie Elphicke | 22 July 2019 | Conservative | Independent | Dover | Suspended once again after being charged with sexual assault. |
| Ivan Lewis | 23 November 2017 | Labour | Independent | Bury South | Suspended from Labour, pending investigation of sexual harassment. Resigned from Labour on 20 December 2018. |
| Barry McElduff | 8 January 2018 | Sinn Féin | Independent | West Tyrone | Suspended from Sinn Féin over a social media video referencing the Kingsmill massacre. Resigned from parliament. |
| John Woodcock | 30 April 2018 | Labour Co-op | Independent | Barrow and Furness | Suspended from Labour over allegations of inappropriate messages to former staff. Resigned from Labour on 18 July 2018. |
| John Woodcock | 10 July 2019 | Independent | The Independents | Barrow and Furness | Formed new political grouping. |
| Ian Paisley | 24 July 2018 | DUP | Independent | North Antrim | Suspended from DUP for not disclosing financial interests from the Sri Lankan government, and then advocating for them. |
| Ian Paisley | 4 September 2018 | Independent | Suspended | North Antrim | Suspended from the House of Commons on 24 July for 30 days beginning 4 September. |
| Ian Paisley | 21 November 2018 | Suspended | DUP | North Antrim | Reinstated to the House of Commons and the DUP. |
| Andrew Griffiths | 21 August 2018 | Conservative | Independent | Burton | Suspended from the Conservatives, pending investigation of inappropriate behaviour with members of staff. |
| Andrew Griffiths | 12 December 2018 | Independent | Conservative | Burton | Reinstated. |
| Frank Field | 30 August 2018 | Labour | Independent | Birkenhead | Resigned from Labour. |
| Frank Field | 2 August 2019 | Independent | Birkenhead Social Justice | Birkenhead | Founded new political party to contest the next election. |
| Stephen Lloyd | 6 December 2018 | Liberal Democrats | Independent | Eastbourne | Resigned the Liberal Democrats whip over the Brexit withdrawal agreement. |
| Fiona Onasanya | 19 December 2018 | Labour | Independent | Peterborough | Suspended from Labour after being convicted of perverting the course of justice. Expelled from Labour in January 2019. Removed from office on 1 May 2019 by a recall petition. |
| Luciana Berger | 18 February 2019 | Labour Co-op | Change UK | Liverpool Wavertree | Resigned from Labour, citing party's approach to Brexit and antisemitism. |
| Luciana Berger | 4 June 2019 | Change UK | Independent | Liverpool Wavertree | Left Change UK following in order to "work cross party" and "respond flexibly". |
| Luciana Berger | 10 July 2019 | Independent | The Independents | Liverpool Wavertree | Formed new political grouping. |
| Luciana Berger | 5 September 2019 | The Independents | Liberal Democrats | Liverpool Wavertree | Joined the Liberal Democrats, citing the "moment of national crisis", as the most effective party to stop Brexit. |
| Ann Coffey | 18 February 2019 | Labour | Change UK | Stockport | Resigned from Labour, citing party's approach to Brexit and antisemitism. |
| Mike Gapes | 18 February 2019 | Labour Co-op | Change UK | Ilford South | Resigned from Labour, citing party's approach to Brexit and antisemitism. |
| Chris Leslie | 18 February 2019 | Labour Co-op | Change UK | Nottingham East | Resigned from Labour, citing party's approach to Brexit and antisemitism. |
| Gavin Shuker | 18 February 2019 | Labour Co-op | Change UK | Luton South | Resigned from Labour, citing party's approach to Brexit and antisemitism. |
| Gavin Shuker | 4 June 2019 | Change UK | Independent | Luton South | Left Change UK following in order to "work cross party" and "respond flexibly". |
| Gavin Shuker | 10 July 2019 | Independent | The Independents | Luton South | Formed new political grouping. |
| Angela Smith | 18 February 2019 | Labour | Change UK | Penistone and Stocksbridge | Resigned from Labour, citing party's approach to Brexit and antisemitism. |
| Angela Smith | 4 June 2019 | Change UK | Independent | Penistone and Stocksbridge | Left Change UK following in order to "work cross party" and "respond flexibly". |
| Angela Smith | 10 July 2019 | Independent | The Independents | Penistone and Stocksbridge | Formed new political grouping. |
| Angela Smith | 7 September 2019 | The Independents | Liberal Democrats | Penistone and Stocksbridge | Defected to the Liberal Democrats. |
| Chuka Umunna | 18 February 2019 | Labour | Change UK | Streatham | Resigned from Labour, citing party's approach to Brexit and antisemitism. |
| Chuka Umunna | 4 June 2019 | Change UK | Independent | Streatham | Left Change UK following in order to "work cross party" and "respond flexibly". |
| Chuka Umunna | 13 June 2019 | Independent | Liberal Democrats | Streatham | Decided against the need for a new political party. |
| Joan Ryan | 19 February 2019 | Labour | Change UK | Enfield North | Resigned from Labour, citing party's approach to Brexit and antisemitism. |
| Anna Soubry | 20 February 2019 | Conservative | Change UK | Broxtowe | Resigned from the Conservatives in response to its perceived move to the political right, such as "Hard Brexit" policies. |
| Heidi Allen | 20 February 2019 | Conservative | Change UK | South Cambridgeshire | Resigned from the Conservatives in response to its perceived move to the political right, such as "Hard Brexit" policies. |
| Heidi Allen | 4 June 2019 | Change UK | Independent | South Cambridgeshire | Wanted to "work cross party" and "respond flexibly". |
| Heidi Allen | 10 July 2019 | Independent | The Independents | South Cambridgeshire | Formed new political grouping. |
| Heidi Allen | 7 October 2019 | The Independents | Liberal Democrats | South Cambridgeshire | Joined the Lib Dems, citing effectiveness as part of a team, rejecting the status quo, and stopping Brexit. |
| Sarah Wollaston | 20 February 2019 | Conservative | Change UK | Totnes | Resigned from the Conservatives in response to its perceived move to the political right, such as "Hard Brexit" policies. |
| Sarah Wollaston | 4 June 2019 | Change UK | Independent | Totnes | Wanted to "work cross party" and "respond flexibly". |
| Sarah Wollaston | 14 August 2019 | Independent | Liberal Democrats | Totnes | Joined the Lib Dems to make the case for the UK to "remain at the heart of Europe". |
| Ian Austin | 22 February 2019 | Labour | Independent | Dudley North | Resigned from Labour, blaming leader Jeremy Corbyn for "creating a culture of extremism and intolerance". |
| Chris Williamson | 27 February 2019 | Labour | Independent | Derby North | Suspended for stating Labour had been "too apologetic" about allegations of antisemitism. |
| Chris Williamson | 26 June 2019 | Independent | Labour | Derby North | Reinstated. |
| Chris Williamson | 28 June 2019 | Labour | Independent | Derby North | Suspended again. |
| Nick Boles | 1 April 2019 | Conservative | Independent | Grantham and Stamford | Resigned from the Conservative Party, objecting that it was refusing to compromise over Brexit. |
| Phillip Lee | 3 September 2019 | Conservative | Liberal Democrats | Bracknell | Resigned from the Conservative Party over its stance on Brexit, and shift to the right. |
| Guto Bebb | 3 September 2019 | Conservative | Independent | Aberconwy | Suspended from the Conservatives after voting against the Government, on a motion to allow Parliament to control the order paper in order to introduce a bill to prevent a no-deal Brexit. |
| Kenneth Clarke | 3 September 2019 | Conservative | Independent | Rushcliffe | Suspended from the Conservatives after voting against the Government, on a motion to allow Parliament to control the order paper in order to introduce a bill to prevent a no-deal Brexit. |
| David Gauke | 3 September 2019 | Conservative | Independent | South West Hertfordshire | Suspended from the Conservatives after voting against the Government, on a motion to allow Parliament to control the order paper in order to introduce a bill to prevent a no-deal Brexit. |
| Justine Greening | 3 September 2019 | Conservative | Independent | Putney | Suspended from the Conservatives after voting against the Government, on a motion to allow Parliament to control the order paper in order to introduce a bill to prevent a no-deal Brexit. |
| Dominic Grieve | 3 September 2019 | Conservative | Independent | Beaconsfield | Suspended from the Conservatives after voting against the Government, on a motion to allow Parliament to control the order paper in order to introduce a bill to prevent a no-deal Brexit. |
| Philip Hammond | 3 September 2019 | Conservative | Independent | Runnymede and Weybridge | Suspended from the Conservatives after voting against the Government, on a motion to allow Parliament to control the order paper in order to introduce a bill to prevent a no-deal Brexit. |
| Oliver Letwin | 3 September 2019 | Conservative | Independent | West Dorset | Suspended from the Conservatives after voting against the Government, on a motion to allow Parliament to control the order paper in order to introduce a bill to prevent a no-deal Brexit. |
| Anne Milton | 3 September 2019 | Conservative | Independent | Guildford | Suspended from the Conservatives after voting against the Government, on a motion to allow Parliament to control the order paper in order to introduce a bill to prevent a no-deal Brexit. |
| Rory Stewart | 3 September 2019 | Conservative | Independent | Penrith and The Border | Suspended from the Conservatives after voting against the Government, on a motion to allow Parliament to control the order paper in order to introduce a bill to prevent a no-deal Brexit. |
| Sam Gyimah | 3 September 2019 | Conservative | Independent | East Surrey | Suspended from the Conservatives after voting against the Government, on a motion to allow Parliament to control the order paper in order to introduce a bill to prevent a no-deal Brexit. |
| Sam Gyimah | 14 September 2019 | Independent | Liberal Democrats | East Surrey | Joined the Lib Dems, citing UK institutions and democracy. |
| Antoinette Sandbach | 3 September 2019 | Conservative | Independent | Eddisbury | Suspended after voting against the Government (see above). |
| Antoinette Sandbach | 31 October 2019 | Independent | Liberal Democrats | Eddisbury | Joined the Lib Dems, citing progressive centre-ground liberal values and the two main parties "floating off to two extremes". |
| Richard Benyon | 3 September 2019 | Conservative | Independent | Newbury | Suspended from the Conservatives on 3 September after voting against the Government, on a motion to allow Parliament to control the order paper in order to introduce a bill to prevent a no-deal Brexit. Whip restored 29 October alongside after meeting with the Prime Minister; standing down at the next election or agreed to support his Withdrawal Agreement if re-elected. |
| Richard Benyon | 29 October 2019 | Independent | Conservative | Newbury | Suspended from the Conservatives on 3 September after voting against the Government, on a motion to allow Parliament to control the order paper in order to introduce a bill to prevent a no-deal Brexit. Whip restored 29 October alongside after meeting with the Prime Minister; standing down at the next election or agreed to support his Withdrawal Agreement if re-elected. |
| Steve Brine | 3 September 2019 | Conservative | Independent | Winchester | Suspended from the Conservatives on 3 September after voting against the Government, on a motion to allow Parliament to control the order paper in order to introduce a bill to prevent a no-deal Brexit. Whip restored 29 October alongside after meeting with the Prime Minister; standing down at the next election or agreed to support his Withdrawal Agreement if re-elected. |
| Steve Brine | 29 October 2019 | Independent | Conservative | Winchester | Suspended from the Conservatives on 3 September after voting against the Government, on a motion to allow Parliament to control the order paper in order to introduce a bill to prevent a no-deal Brexit. Whip restored 29 October alongside after meeting with the Prime Minister; standing down at the next election or agreed to support his Withdrawal Agreement if re-elected. |
| Alistair Burt | 3 September 2019 | Conservative | Independent | North East Bedfordshire | Suspended from the Conservatives on 3 September after voting against the Government, on a motion to allow Parliament to control the order paper in order to introduce a bill to prevent a no-deal Brexit. Whip restored 29 October alongside after meeting with the Prime Minister; standing down at the next election or agreed to support his Withdrawal Agreement if re-elected. |
| Alistair Burt | 29 October 2019 | Independent | Conservative | North East Bedfordshire | Suspended from the Conservatives on 3 September after voting against the Government, on a motion to allow Parliament to control the order paper in order to introduce a bill to prevent a no-deal Brexit. Whip restored 29 October alongside after meeting with the Prime Minister; standing down at the next election or agreed to support his Withdrawal Agreement if re-elected. |
| Greg Clark | 3 September 2019 | Conservative | Independent | Tunbridge Wells | Suspended from the Conservatives on 3 September after voting against the Government, on a motion to allow Parliament to control the order paper in order to introduce a bill to prevent a no-deal Brexit. Whip restored 29 October alongside after meeting with the Prime Minister; standing down at the next election or agreed to support his Withdrawal Agreement if re-elected. |
| Greg Clark | 29 October 2019 | Independent | Conservative | Tunbridge Wells | Suspended from the Conservatives on 3 September after voting against the Government, on a motion to allow Parliament to control the order paper in order to introduce a bill to prevent a no-deal Brexit. Whip restored 29 October alongside after meeting with the Prime Minister; standing down at the next election or agreed to support his Withdrawal Agreement if re-elected. |
| Stephen Hammond | 3 September 2019 | Conservative | Independent | Wimbledon | Suspended from the Conservatives on 3 September after voting against the Government, on a motion to allow Parliament to control the order paper in order to introduce a bill to prevent a no-deal Brexit. Whip restored 29 October alongside after meeting with the Prime Minister; standing down at the next election or agreed to support his Withdrawal Agreement if re-elected. |
| Stephen Hammond | 29 October 2019 | Independent | Conservative | Wimbledon | Suspended from the Conservatives on 3 September after voting against the Government, on a motion to allow Parliament to control the order paper in order to introduce a bill to prevent a no-deal Brexit. Whip restored 29 October alongside after meeting with the Prime Minister; standing down at the next election or agreed to support his Withdrawal Agreement if re-elected. |
| Richard Harrington | 3 September 2019 | Conservative | Independent | Watford | Suspended from the Conservatives on 3 September after voting against the Government, on a motion to allow Parliament to control the order paper in order to introduce a bill to prevent a no-deal Brexit. Whip restored 29 October alongside after meeting with the Prime Minister; standing down at the next election or agreed to support his Withdrawal Agreement if re-elected. |
| Richard Harrington | 29 October 2019 | Independent | Conservative | Watford | Suspended from the Conservatives on 3 September after voting against the Government, on a motion to allow Parliament to control the order paper in order to introduce a bill to prevent a no-deal Brexit. Whip restored 29 October alongside after meeting with the Prime Minister; standing down at the next election or agreed to support his Withdrawal Agreement if re-elected. |
| Margot James | 3 September 2019 | Conservative | Independent | Stourbridge | Suspended from the Conservatives on 3 September after voting against the Government, on a motion to allow Parliament to control the order paper in order to introduce a bill to prevent a no-deal Brexit. Whip restored 29 October alongside after meeting with the Prime Minister; standing down at the next election or agreed to support his Withdrawal Agreement if re-elected. |
| Margot James | 29 October 2019 | Independent | Conservative | Stourbridge | Suspended from the Conservatives on 3 September after voting against the Government, on a motion to allow Parliament to control the order paper in order to introduce a bill to prevent a no-deal Brexit. Whip restored 29 October alongside after meeting with the Prime Minister; standing down at the next election or agreed to support his Withdrawal Agreement if re-elected. |
| Caroline Nokes | 3 September 2019 | Conservative | Independent | Romsey and Southampton North | Suspended from the Conservatives on 3 September after voting against the Government, on a motion to allow Parliament to control the order paper in order to introduce a bill to prevent a no-deal Brexit. Whip restored 29 October alongside after meeting with the Prime Minister; standing down at the next election or agreed to support his Withdrawal Agreement if re-elected. |
| Caroline Nokes | 29 October 2019 | Independent | Conservative | Romsey and Southampton North | Suspended from the Conservatives on 3 September after voting against the Government, on a motion to allow Parliament to control the order paper in order to introduce a bill to prevent a no-deal Brexit. Whip restored 29 October alongside after meeting with the Prime Minister; standing down at the next election or agreed to support his Withdrawal Agreement if re-elected. |
| Nicholas Soames | 3 September 2019 | Conservative | Independent | Mid Sussex | Suspended from the Conservatives on 3 September after voting against the Government, on a motion to allow Parliament to control the order paper in order to introduce a bill to prevent a no-deal Brexit. Whip restored 29 October alongside after meeting with the Prime Minister; standing down at the next election or agreed to support his Withdrawal Agreement if re-elected. |
| Nicholas Soames | 29 October 2019 | Independent | Conservative | Mid Sussex | Suspended from the Conservatives on 3 September after voting against the Government, on a motion to allow Parliament to control the order paper in order to introduce a bill to prevent a no-deal Brexit. Whip restored 29 October alongside after meeting with the Prime Minister; standing down at the next election or agreed to support his Withdrawal Agreement if re-elected. |
| Ed Vaizey | 3 September 2019 | Conservative | Independent | Wantage | Suspended from the Conservatives on 3 September after voting against the Government, on a motion to allow Parliament to control the order paper in order to introduce a bill to prevent a no-deal Brexit. Whip restored 29 October alongside after meeting with the Prime Minister; standing down at the next election or agreed to support his Withdrawal Agreement if re-elected. |
| Ed Vaizey | 29 October 2019 | Independent | Conservative | Wantage | Suspended from the Conservatives on 3 September after voting against the Government, on a motion to allow Parliament to control the order paper in order to introduce a bill to prevent a no-deal Brexit. Whip restored 29 October alongside after meeting with the Prime Minister; standing down at the next election or agreed to support his Withdrawal Agreement if re-elected. |
| Amber Rudd | 7 September 2019 | Conservative | Independent | Hastings and Rye | Resigned, saying leaving the EU with a deal was no longer HM Government's main objective and objecting to deselection of "The 21". |
| Mike Hill | 22 September 2019 | Labour | Independent | Hartlepool | Suspended over allegations of sexual harassment. |
| Mike Hill | 21 October 2019 | Independent | Labour | Hartlepool | Reinstated after allegations of sexual harassment were dropped. |
| Stephen Hepburn | 7 October 2019 | Labour | Independent | Jarrow | Suspended over allegations of sexual harassment. |
| Louise Ellman | 17 October 2019 | Labour Co-op | Independent | Liverpool Riverside | Resigned from Labour over antisemitism in the party, saying that Jeremy Corbyn is "not fit" to become prime minister. |
| Keith Vaz | 31 October 2019 | Labour | Suspended | Leicester East | Suspended from the House of Commons for 6 months, following Commons Standards Committee's findings that he "expressed willingness" to purchase cocaine for sex workers. |
| John Bercow | 4 November 2019 | The Speaker | Vacant | Buckingham | Stepped down as Speaker after ten years, and as MP. |
| Lindsay Hoyle | 4 November 2019 | Labour | The Speaker | Chorley | Elected and royally approved as Speaker after nine years as Chairman of Ways and Means. |

== Progression of government majority and party totals ==
The majority is calculated as above.

| Date | Event | Majority | Con | DUP | Lab | SNP | LD | SF | PC | Grn | CUK | TI | BSJP | Speaker | Ind | Suspended | Vacant |
|---|---|---|---|---|---|---|---|---|---|---|---|---|---|---|---|---|---|
| 21 June 2017 | Opening of Parliament | 13 | 317 | 10 | 262 | 35 | 12 | 7 | 4 | 1 | | | | 1 | 1 | 0 | 0 |
| 10 July 2017 | Morris suspended from Conservatives | 11 | 316 | 10 | 262 | 35 | 12 | 7 | 4 | 1 | | | | 1 | 2 | 0 | 0 |
| 25 October 2017 | O'Mara suspended from Labour | 11 | 316 | 10 | 261 | 35 | 12 | 7 | 4 | 1 | | | | 1 | 3 | 0 | 0 |
| 2 November 2017 | Hopkins suspended from Labour | 11 | 316 | 10 | 260 | 35 | 12 | 7 | 4 | 1 | | | | 1 | 4 | 0 | 0 |
| 3 November 2017 | Elphicke suspended from Conservatives | 9 | 315 | 10 | 260 | 35 | 12 | 7 | 4 | 1 | | | | 1 | 5 | 0 | 0 |
| 23 November 2017 | Lewis suspended from Labour | 9 | 315 | 10 | 259 | 35 | 12 | 7 | 4 | 1 | | | | 1 | 6 | 0 | 0 |
| 12 December 2017 | Morris readmitted to Conservatives | 11 | 316 | 10 | 259 | 35 | 12 | 7 | 4 | 1 | | | | 1 | 5 | 0 | 0 |
2018
| Date | Event | Majority | Con | DUP | Lab | SNP | LD | SF | PC | Grn | CUK | TI | BSJP | Speaker | Ind | Suspended | Vacant |
| 8 January 2018 | McElduff suspended from Sinn Féin | 11 | 316 | 10 | 259 | 35 | 12 | 6 | 4 | 1 | | | | 1 | 6 | 0 | 0 |
| 16 January 2018 | McElduff (Ind) resigns seat | 11 | 316 | 10 | 259 | 35 | 12 | 6 | 4 | 1 | | | | 1 | 5 | 0 | 1 |
| 30 April 2018 | Woodcock suspended from Labour | 11 | 316 | 10 | 258 | 35 | 12 | 6 | 4 | 1 | | | | 1 | 6 | 0 | 1 |
| 3 May 2018 | Begley wins W Tyrone by-election for Sinn Féin | 11 | 316 | 10 | 258 | 35 | 12 | 7 | 4 | 1 | | | | 1 | 6 | 0 | 0 |
| 9 May 2018 | Alexander (Labour) resigns seat | 12 | 316 | 10 | 257 | 35 | 12 | 7 | 4 | 1 | | | | 1 | 6 | 0 | 1 |
| 14 June 2018 | Daby wins Lewisham E by-election for Labour | 11 | 316 | 10 | 258 | 35 | 12 | 7 | 4 | 1 | | | | 1 | 6 | 0 | 0 |
| 3 July 2018 | O'Mara readmitted to Labour | 11 | 316 | 10 | 259 | 35 | 12 | 7 | 4 | 1 | | | | 1 | 5 | 0 | 0 |
| 12 July 2018 | O'Mara resigns from Labour | 11 | 316 | 10 | 258 | 35 | 12 | 7 | 4 | 1 | | | | 1 | 6 | 0 | 0 |
| 24 July 2018 | Paisley suspended from DUP | 9 | 316 | 9 | 258 | 35 | 12 | 7 | 4 | 1 | | | | 1 | 7 | 0 | 0 |
| 21 August 2018 | Griffiths suspended from Conservatives | 7 | 315 | 9 | 258 | 35 | 12 | 7 | 4 | 1 | | | | 1 | 8 | 0 | 0 |
| 30 August 2018 | Field resigns from Labour | 7 | 315 | 9 | 257 | 35 | 12 | 7 | 4 | 1 | | | | 1 | 9 | 0 | 0 |
| 21 November 2018 | Paisley readmitted to DUP | 9 | 315 | 10 | 257 | 35 | 12 | 7 | 4 | 1 | | | | 1 | 8 | 0 | 0 |
| 6 December 2018 | Lloyd resigns from Liberal Democrats | 9 | 315 | 10 | 257 | 35 | 11 | 7 | 4 | 1 | | | | 1 | 9 | 0 | 0 |
| 12 December 2018 | Elphicke, Griffiths readmitted to Conservatives | 13 | 317 | 10 | 257 | 35 | 11 | 7 | 4 | 1 | | | | 1 | 7 | 0 | 0 |
| 19 December 2018 | Onasanya suspended from Labour | 13 | 317 | 10 | 256 | 35 | 11 | 7 | 4 | 1 | | | | 1 | 8 | 0 | 0 |
2019
| Date | Event | Majority | Con | DUP | Lab | SNP | LD | SF | PC | Grn | CUK | TI | BSJP | Speaker | Ind | Suspended | Vacant |
| 17 February 2019 | Flynn (Labour) dies | 14 | 317 | 10 | 255 | 35 | 11 | 7 | 4 | 1 | | | | 1 | 8 | 0 | 1 |
| 18 February 2019 | Seven Labour MPs leave to join Change UK | 14 | 317 | 10 | 248 | 35 | 11 | 7 | 4 | 1 | 7 | | | 1 | 8 | 0 | 1 |
| 19 February 2019 | Ryan leaves Labour for Change UK | 14 | 317 | 10 | 247 | 35 | 11 | 7 | 4 | 1 | 8 | | | 1 | 8 | 0 | 1 |
| 20 February 2019 | Three Conservative MPs join Change UK | 8 | 314 | 10 | 247 | 35 | 11 | 7 | 4 | 1 | 11 | | | 1 | 8 | 0 | 1 |
| 22 February 2019 | Austin resigns from Labour | 8 | 314 | 10 | 246 | 35 | 11 | 7 | 4 | 1 | 11 | | | 1 | 9 | 0 | 1 |
| 27 February 2019 | Williamson suspended from Labour | 8 | 314 | 10 | 245 | 35 | 11 | 7 | 4 | 1 | 11 | | | 1 | 10 | 0 | 1 |
| 1 April 2019 | Boles resigns from Conservatives | 6 | 313 | 10 | 245 | 35 | 11 | 7 | 4 | 1 | 11 | | | 1 | 11 | 0 | 1 |
| 4 April 2019 | Jones wins Newport West by-election for Labour | 5 | 313 | 10 | 246 | 35 | 11 | 7 | 4 | 1 | 11 | | | 1 | 11 | 0 | 0 |
| 1 May 2019 | Onasanya (Ind) removed by recall petition | 6 | 313 | 10 | 246 | 35 | 11 | 7 | 4 | 1 | 11 | | | 1 | 10 | 0 | 1 |
| 4 June 2019 | Six MPs leave Change UK, become Independent | 6 | 313 | 10 | 246 | 35 | 11 | 7 | 4 | 1 | 5 | | | 1 | 16 | 0 | 1 |
| 6 June 2019 | Forbes wins Peterborough by-election for Labour | 5 | 313 | 10 | 247 | 35 | 11 | 7 | 4 | 1 | 5 | | | 1 | 16 | 0 | 0 |
| 13 June 2019 | Umunna (Ind) joins Liberal Democrats | 5 | 313 | 10 | 247 | 35 | 12 | 7 | 4 | 1 | 5 | | | 1 | 15 | 0 | 0 |
| 21 June 2019 | Davies (Con) removed after recall petition | 4 | 312 | 10 | 247 | 35 | 12 | 7 | 4 | 1 | 5 | | | 1 | 15 | 0 | 1 |
| 10 July 2019 | Five independent MPs form The Independents | 4 | 312 | 10 | 247 | 35 | 12 | 7 | 4 | 1 | 5 | 5 | | 1 | 10 | 0 | 1 |
| 22 July 2019 | Elphicke suspended from Conservatives | 2 | 311 | 10 | 247 | 35 | 12 | 7 | 4 | 1 | 5 | 5 | | 1 | 11 | 0 | 1 |
| 1 August 2019 | Dodds wins Brecon & Radnor by-election for Lib Dems | 1 | 311 | 10 | 247 | 35 | 13 | 7 | 4 | 1 | 5 | 5 | | 1 | 11 | 0 | 0 |
| 2 August 2019 | Field forms BJSP | 1 | 311 | 10 | 247 | 35 | 13 | 7 | 4 | 1 | 5 | 5 | 1 | 1 | 10 | 0 | 0 |
| 15 August 2019 | Wollaston (Ind) joins Liberal Democrats | 1 | 311 | 10 | 247 | 35 | 14 | 7 | 4 | 1 | 5 | 5 | 1 | 1 | 9 | 0 | 0 |
| 3 September 2019 | Lee (Con) joins Lib Dems; 21 Con MPs become Inds | -43 | 289 | 10 | 247 | 35 | 15 | 7 | 4 | 1 | 5 | 5 | 1 | 1 | 30 | 0 | 0 |
| 5 September 2019 | Berger (The Independents) joins the Lib Dems | -43 | 289 | 10 | 247 | 35 | 16 | 7 | 4 | 1 | 5 | 4 | 1 | 1 | 30 | 0 | 0 |
| 7 September 2019 | Rudd resigns from Cons; Smith (TI) joins Lib Dems | -45 | 288 | 10 | 247 | 35 | 17 | 7 | 4 | 1 | 5 | 3 | 1 | 1 | 31 | 0 | 0 |
| 14 September 2019 | Gyimah (Ind) joins Lib Dems | -45 | 288 | 10 | 247 | 35 | 18 | 7 | 4 | 1 | 5 | 3 | 1 | 1 | 30 | 0 | 0 |
| 22 September 2019 | Hill suspended from Labour | -45 | 288 | 10 | 246 | 35 | 18 | 7 | 4 | 1 | 5 | 3 | 1 | 1 | 31 | 0 | 0 |
| 7 October 2019 | Hepburn suspended from Lab; Allen (TI) joins Lib Dems | -45 | 288 | 10 | 245 | 35 | 19 | 7 | 4 | 1 | 5 | 2 | 1 | 1 | 32 | 0 | 0 |
| 16 October 2019 | Ellman resigns from Labour | -45 | 288 | 10 | 244 | 35 | 19 | 7 | 4 | 1 | 5 | 2 | 1 | 1 | 33 | 0 | 0 |
| 21 October 2019 | Hill readmitted to Labour | -45 | 288 | 10 | 245 | 35 | 19 | 7 | 4 | 1 | 5 | 2 | 1 | 1 | 32 | 0 | 0 |
| 28 October 2019 | Mann (Labour) vacates seat on elevation to Lords | -44 | 288 | 10 | 244 | 35 | 19 | 7 | 4 | 1 | 5 | 2 | 1 | 1 | 32 | 0 | 1 |
| 29 October 2019 | 10 Inds have Con whip restored | -24 | 298 | 10 | 244 | 35 | 19 | 7 | 4 | 1 | 5 | 2 | 1 | 1 | 22 | 0 | 1 |
| 31 October 2019 | Sandbach to LD; Vaz suspended | -23 | 298 | 10 | 243 | 35 | 20 | 7 | 4 | 1 | 5 | 2 | 1 | 1 | 21 | 1 | 1 |
| 4 November 2019 | Bercow (Speaker) vacates seat; Hoyle elected Speaker | -23 | 298 | 10 | 242 | 35 | 20 | 7 | 4 | 1 | 5 | 2 | 1 | 1 | 21 | 1 | 2 |
| Date | Event | Majority | Con | DUP | Lab | SNP | LD | SF | PC | Grn | CUK | TI | BSJP | Speaker | Ind | Suspended | Vacant |

== See also ==
- List of United Kingdom MPs by seniority (2017–2019)
