= Angela Smith (South Yorkshire politician) =

British Labour politician

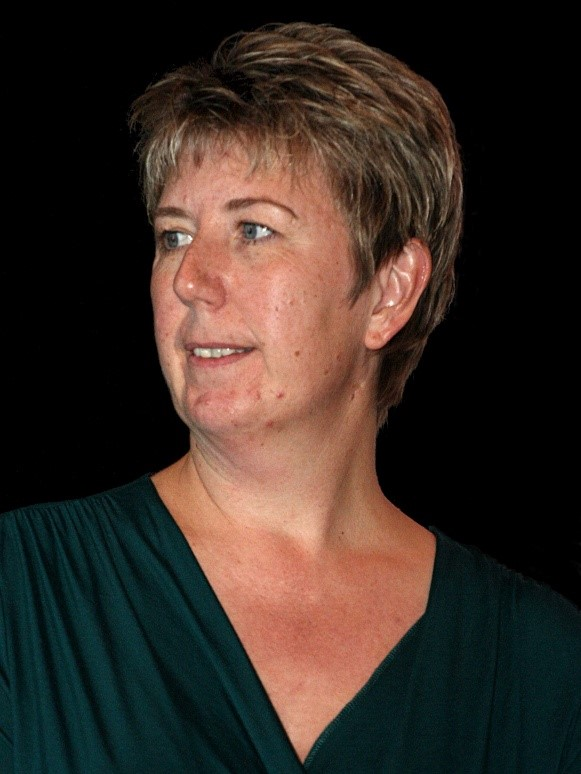
- Smith in 2009

Shadow Deputy Leader of the House of Commons
- In office 7 October 2011 – 15 April 2014
- Leader: Ed Miliband
- Preceded by: Helen Jones
- Succeeded by: Thomas Docherty

Member of Parliament for Penistone and Stocksbridge Sheffield Hillsborough (2005–2010)
- In office 5 May 2005 – 6 November 2019
- Preceded by: Helen Jackson
- Succeeded by: Miriam Cates

Personal details
- Born: Angela Christine Smith; 16 August 1961 (age 65) Grimsby, Lincolnshire, England
- Party: Labour (1977–2019; 2022–present)
- Other political affiliations: Parliamentary affiliation: The Independents (2019); Party membership: Independent (2019); Change UK (2019); Liberal Democrats (2019–2022)
- Spouse: Steven Wilson (m. 2005)
- Children: 1 stepdaughter
- Education: University of Nottingham; Newnham College, Cambridge (did not graduate)
- Profession: Lecturer
- Website: www.angelasmith-mp.org.uk
- Other offices: October–December 2019: Liberal Democrat Spokesperson for International Development; March–June 2019: Change UK Spokesperson for Energy, Environment, Transport, Local Government and Housing

Angela Christine Smith (born 16 August 1961) is a British former politician who served as Member of Parliament (MP) for Penistone and Stocksbridge from 2010 to 2019 and MP for Sheffield Hillsborough from 2005 to 2010. A member of the Labour Party, she was previously an MP for Labour, later for Change UK, later still as a member of The Independents, then joined the Liberal Democrats before leaving Parliament in 2019. She rejoined Labour in 2022.

Smith was an early critic of Jeremy Corbyn's leadership, backing a no-confidence vote in 2016; in part due to this position, she lost a no-confidence motion in her constituency. She resigned from Labour in February 2019 alongside six other MPs in protest at Corbyn's leadership, and they formed the Independent Group, later Change UK. In June 2019, she left Change UK to sit as an independent MP before joining the Liberal Democrats in September. At the 2019 general election, she stood as a Liberal Democrat in Altrincham and Sale West, where she finished third.

== Early life and career before Parliament ==
Smith was born on 16 August 1961 in Grimsby. She grew up in Grimsby, where her grandfather had been Mayor. She attended Waltham Leas Primary School (now The Leas Junior School) in Waltham and Tollbar Secondary School, in New Waltham, Lincolnshire.

She joined the Labour Party at the age of 16 and worked for the NHS for five years, before taking A-levels on an evening course. She studied English at the University of Nottingham in September 1987. Smith began a PhD at Newnham College, Cambridge, but did not complete it. She was an English lecturer at Dearne Valley College in Wath upon Dearne from 1994 until 2003.

She stood unsuccessfully as the Labour Party candidate for the Castle Ward of Cambridge City Council in May 1994. She was elected a Labour member of Sheffield City Council in 1996 for the ward of Broomhill, before winning in Birley ward in 2000 and 2004. She stood down in 2005 and the new Labour candidate won the by-election in May 2005.

== Parliamentary career ==
At the 2005 general election, Smith was elected Member of Parliament for Sheffield Hillsborough. In 2007, she was appointed Parliamentary Private Secretary and chief aide to Yvette Cooper.

The Sheffield Hillsborough seat was abolished at the 2010 election, but Smith was elected as the MP for the newly created Penistone and Stocksbridge constituency. She was re-elected at the 2015 general election and 2017 general election.

In 2016, Smith backed a vote of no confidence in Labour leader Jeremy Corbyn in events which led to a leadership election in which Corbyn was re-elected as leader with an increased majority.

=== Positions ===
After a period as opposition Whip, Smith was promoted to the front bench as the Shadow Deputy Leader of the House in October 2010.

In Parliament, she is a member of the Environment, Food and Rural Affairs Committee, and is a former member of the Administration Committee, the Procedure Committee, the Regulatory Reform Committee and Transport Committee.

She is a trustee of the Industry and Parliament Trust, which works to promote an understanding of business amongst parliamentarians and policymakers.

In 2013, she became a vice-president of the League Against Cruel Sports.

Since February 2016, Smith has served as a member of the advisory board at Polar Research and Policy Initiative.

She was a member of Labour Friends of Israel.

=== Campaigns ===
During her tenure Smith worked to reinstate the former Woodhead line between Hadfield and Penistone. Smith is one of 71 MPs who have signed a petition to re-open the trans-Pennine route, and she has on more than one occasion headed debates in Westminster on the need for more railway investment in the north.

In July 2009, she introduced a symbolic Ten Minute Rule Bill to the House of Commons which, if accepted by government, would have changed the law to give people more legal protection against attacks by dogs. She worked with the RSPCA and the Communication Workers Union on the issue. It failed.

Smith was voted Constituency MP of the year 2011–12, voted for by fellow MPs, honouring her campaign against the axing of an £80 million loan to Sheffield Forgemasters.

She followed this up by being awarded the League Against Cruel Sports' Parliamentarian of the Year in 2013 for her efforts against the trial badger cull, in which she worked with campaigner Brian May, as well as recognition for her wider campaign in protecting animals from cruelty.

In 2018, Smith opposed Labour Shadow Chancellor John McDonnell's policy of re-nationalising England and Wales's water networks, saying such plans were "an expensive indulgence in the politics of the past ... founded on the altar of ideology and constantly vulnerable to political interference". She has called for "rigorous reform" of Ofwat (England and Wales's water regulator).

=== Motion of no confidence ===
On 16 November 2018, her Constituency Labour Party passed a motion of no confidence in her on the grounds of her lack of support for the party leadership, her support for fracking and her opposition to water re-nationalisation. Smith tweeted that her "first priority is always to do my job, to the best of my ability" and that her defeat was as a result of "a cabal of hard left members" who had "absorbed everyone's precious time and energy on an inaccurate and divisive motion of no confidence".

=== Expenses ===
Smith was one of 98 MPs who voted unsuccessfully to keep their expense details secret in 2007. She defended her vote on the grounds that it would help member-constituent confidentiality and help prevent the private addresses of MPs being readily available to the public.

In 2009, Smith was one of the MPs whose expenses were highlighted by The Daily Telegraph during the Parliamentary expenses scandal, as she had submitted expenses claims for four beds for a one-bedroom flat in London.

Smith employed her husband as her Senior Parliamentary Assistant on a salary of up to £40,000. The practice of MPs employing family members has been criticised by some sections of the media on the grounds that it promotes nepotism. Although MPs who were first elected in 2017 have been banned from employing family members, the restriction is not retrospective.

=== The Independent Group and The Independents ===
On 18 February 2019, Smith and six other MPs (Chuka Umunna, Luciana Berger, Chris Leslie, Mike Gapes, Gavin Shuker, and Ann Coffey) resigned the Labour whip to sit as The Independent Group of MPs in the House of Commons. These resignations were prompted by issues with Jeremy Corbyn's leadership of the Labour Party, including allegations of the mishandling of antisemitism and his approach to Brexit. In June 2019, she left this group to sit as an independent MP.

In 2019, Smith attracted condemnation when, shortly after citing antisemitism as one of her reasons for leaving Labour at the Independent Group launch earlier that day, she appeared on BBC Two's Politics Live where she referred to fighting racism as "not just about being black or a funny tin..." before hesitating and then finishing the sentence with "from the BME community": the unfinished word was widely taken to have been 'tinge'. She later issued a video statement in which she said she "misspoke very badly". Smith later told Sky News that she had been "very, very tired".

In July 2019, Smith was a founding member of a grouping of MPs called The Independents.

=== Liberal Democrats ===
On 8 September 2019, it was announced that Smith had joined the Liberal Democrats. At the 2019 general election, she stood as a Liberal Democrat in Altrincham and Sale West, finishing in third place with 11% of the vote. During the election campaign, Smith complained that she was effectively being discriminated against because she would not receive the MP's LOOP (loss of office payment) as a consequence of changing constituencies if defeated – drawing an apparent contrast with controversial ex-Labour MP Jared O'Mara, who at the time had not ruled out defending his seat.

== Post-parliamentary career ==
In July 2020, Smith joined the board of Portsmouth Water as an independent non-executive director. She had previously voiced opposition to nationalising England's water industry.

In July 2021, she joined the Greyhound Board of Great Britain as an independent Director.

== Personal life and family ==
In 2005, Smith married Steve Wilson, a Sheffield city councillor. She is a Sheffield Wednesday F.C. season ticket holder, a Rolling Stones fan, and a keen walker.

Parliament of the United Kingdom
Preceded by Helen Jackson	Member of Parliament for Sheffield Hillsborough; 2005–2010	Constituency abolished
New constituency	Member of Parliament for Penistone & Stocksbridge; 2010–2019	Succeeded by Miriam Cates
Party political offices
Preceded by Chuka Umunna	Liberal Democrat Spokesperson for International Development; 2019	Succeeded by Wendy Chamberlain
