= Jared O'Mara =

British politician and fraudster (born 1981)

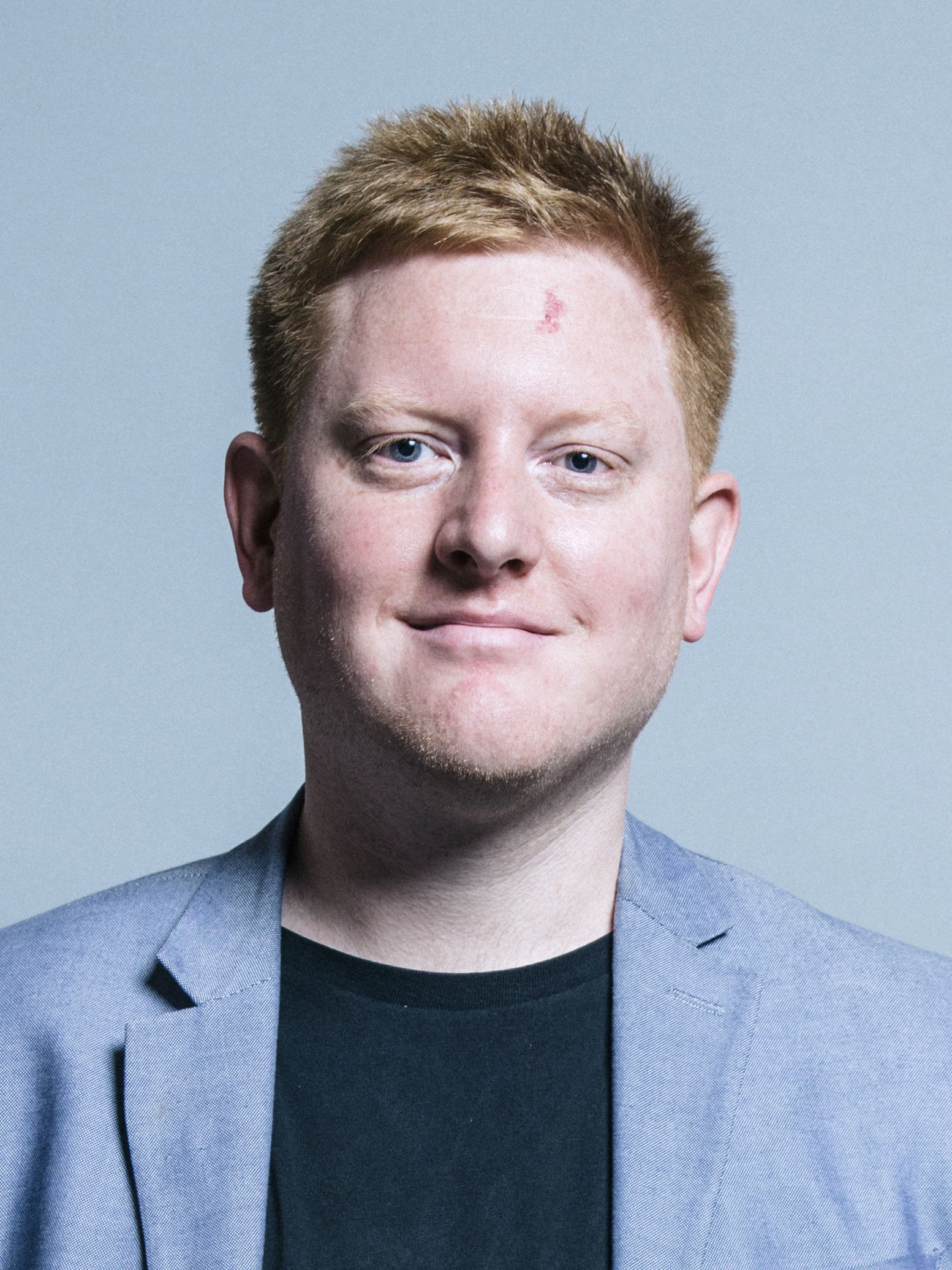
- Official portrait, 2017

Member of Parliament for Sheffield Hallam
- In office 8 June 2017 – 6 November 2019
- Preceded by: Nick Clegg
- Succeeded by: Olivia Blake

Personal details
- Born: Jared Cain O'Mara; 15 November 1981 (age 44) Sheffield, South Yorkshire, England
- Party: Independent (2018–present)
- Other political affiliations: Labour (until 2018; suspended 2017–2018)
- Education: University of Staffordshire (BA)
- Criminal information
- Status: Convicted/found guilty
- Conviction: Fraud by false representation
- Penalty: 4 years in prison

Jared Cain O'Mara (born 15 November 1981) is a British convicted fraudster and former Labour politician who was Member of Parliament (MP) for Sheffield Hallam from 2017 to 2019.

Elected at the 2017 general election for the Labour Party, O'Mara unexpectedly won the seat from former Liberal Democrat Deputy Prime Minister Nick Clegg. In October 2017, it was revealed that O'Mara had posted misogynistic, racist and homophobic online comments before he became an MP. He resigned from the Women and Equalities Select Committee, and was suspended from the Labour Party. After being briefly reinstated, he resigned from the Labour Party in July 2018.

He has cerebral palsy and hemiparesis, and later stated that he was the first autistic MP in history. O'Mara took lengthy periods of time off for mental health issues, and never asked an oral question in his two-year parliamentary career. He missed key Brexit votes in the House of Commons, and showed what was described by an aide as "vile, inexcusable contempt" for constituents who called for his resignation.

In July 2019, O'Mara was accused of corruption and sexual harassment. His office was raided by police, and he was arrested but released without charge. He stood down at the December 2019 general election. In February 2023, O'Mara was found guilty of six counts of fraud by false representation, and was sentenced to four years in prison.

== Early life ==
O'Mara was born in Sheffield on 15 November 1981. He was educated at Tapton School, in the city's Crosspool suburb, and graduated from University of Staffordshire with a first class honours degree in journalism.

Before entering politics, he ran West Street Live, a bar and music venue in Sheffield, with friends. He was also a local school governor and had volunteered for Sheffield-based disability information services and charities.

== Parliamentary career ==
=== Election ===
Prior to being elected, O'Mara had stood as a Labour candidate in various Sheffield council elections. He supported Jeremy Corbyn's election as Leader of the Labour Party in 2015 and 2016. At the 2017 general election, O'Mara was selected for the constituency of Sheffield Hallam in an emergency selection process for the snap election under the control of the National Executive Committee and regional boards, rather than by the local constituency party. The seat had been held by former Liberal Democrat leader and Deputy Prime Minister Nick Clegg.

O'Mara's campaign focused on disabled people's rights, protecting public services and on his personal background in Sheffield. His campaign benefited from a national surge in the Labour vote and from university students in the constituency. It was claimed Nick Clegg was thought to be too anti-Brexit by voters, although Sheffield Hallam was estimated to have voted Remain in the 2016 European Union referendum and O'Mara also supported Remain. A Momentum supporter, O'Mara was backed by them during the election campaign. He won the seat with a majority of 2,125 votes, overturning Clegg's previous majority of 2,353 votes. The result was considered one of the most important seat changes of the night; O'Mara had not expected to win the seat. His acceptance speech called for politicians to do more to stand up for disabled people.

O'Mara asked his first Parliamentary written question in October 2017. During his time as an MP, he campaigned for a second referendum on Brexit and against fracking. He never asked an oral question in the House of Commons.

=== Labour whip suspension over online comments ===
O'Mara became a member of the Women and Equalities Select Committee in September 2017. However, a series of misogynistic and homophobic online comments posted by O'Mara over a decade before he became an MP were revealed by the Guido Fawkes site on 23 October 2017. He commented about the Girls Aloud pop group: "I advise you to sack Sarah and the remaining four members (Nicola, Cheryl, Nadine and Kimberley) come have an orgy with me"; and said the 2003 winner of Pop Idol, Michelle McManus, had "only won because she was fat". He had also referred to gay men as "poofters" and "fudge packers", and referred to jazz musician Jamie Cullum as a "conceited cunt" who should be "sodomised with his own piano". O'Mara apologised "if his comments caused offence" and resigned from the Women and Equalities Select Committee. In a later speech, O'Mara said the homophobic words he used were part of an Eminem record he listened to at the time.

The following day, O'Mara was accused by Sophie Evans, a Sheffield bar worker whom he had met through an online dating app, on BBC Two's Daily Politics of having "made transphobic slurs" towards her in March 2017, and of saying in the same incident that she was an "ugly bitch". O'Mara denied the allegation. On the same day, it also emerged that he had been posting derogatory comments about children in Sheffield and appeared to advocate corporal punishment to deal with delinquent youth. Following the emergence of the comments to Evans, the Labour Party announced an investigation into O'Mara's conduct but stopped short of suspending him from the party.

Further revelations were made public on 25 October 2017. He was found to have used racist insults on a Morrissey fan site in 2002, saying that Danes were "pig shaggers" who "practised bestiality" and referring to Spaniards as "dagos". O'Mara, when reviewing the Arctic Monkeys in November 2004, made several sexual comments including how "sexy little slags" danced to the band's songs. These revelations resulted in O'Mara being suspended from the Labour Party and therefore having the party whip withdrawn. After the party whip was suspended, O'Mara cancelled his constituency surgery and would not speak publicly again for some months afterwards. It also came to light that O'Mara was a member of a band called Dirty Rotten Troubadours. A song by the band emerged, allegedly sung by O'Mara, contained the lyrics: "I wish I were a misogynist / I'd put her in her place / I wish I were a misogynist / I'd smash her in her face."

=== Disabilities ===
O'Mara has stated that he has cerebral palsy and hemiparesis. He claimed in July 2018, after resigning his membership of the Labour Party, that he is on the autism spectrum and believed that he was the first autistic MP in history. It was claimed that the buildings of the House of Commons therefore presented problems for O'Mara as the standards of the Equality Act 2010 had not been met. In June 2017, Speaker of the House of Commons John Bercow allowed MPs not to wear ties in the House of Commons, a decision welcomed by O'Mara, who stated that cerebral palsy made it difficult for him to knot and wear a tie. O'Mara said he would not have run for election had he known these difficulties before becoming an MP. O'Mara supported a zero-tolerance policy on shouting and heckling, saying that he could not attend Prime Minister's Questions because of his anxiety triggered by aggression in the chamber. O'Mara also supported exempting members from interventions during speeches, introducing proxy voting and allowing MPs to make speeches to the House of Commons via online video-stream.

In December 2017, a press statement explained O'Mara would be on leave of absence on the advice of his general practitioner, who had discouraged him from attending Parliament, although O'Mara would continue to deal with his constituent casework.

After three months' absence, O'Mara returned to the House of Commons on 17 January 2018 and voted on the report stage of the European Union (Withdrawal) Bill.

On 18 July 2018, O'Mara announced he would step back from his parliamentary duties on the advice of his GP. This coincided with a series of crucial votes on the Brexit negotiations, for which reason O'Mara had unsuccessfully applied to vote by proxy. In March 2019, O'Mara was absent for another series of key Brexit votes, having had an injury in the shower. After facing calls from his constituents to resign, O'Mara likened them to "a hooligan on the terraces threatening the referee whilst drinking flat lager and smelling of processed meats." He was ranked by constituents across the United Kingdom as the 5th-worst sitting MP by a Change.org poll in 2019.

=== Reinstatement and resignation from Labour Party ===
On 3 July 2018, it was announced that O'Mara would be readmitted to the Labour Party, following a review by its National Executive Committee disputes panel. This review had decided to issue O'Mara a formal warning with a mandatory requirement to attend training, rather than refer the issue to the National Constitutional Committee which has the power to expel members. The decision was criticised by local Liberal Democrats, the closest challengers to Labour in Sheffield Hallam. In an interview with ITV following his readmission, O'Mara said he had made three attempts on his life during his suspension and had developed an anxiety disorder. He restated his apology and asked for forgiveness from his constituents and the country. He refused to call a by-election and promised to make his maiden speech in July 2018. He made his maiden speech on 24 July 2018, the day before the start of the summer recess. He was the 84th and final MP of the 2017 intake to make a maiden speech; the 83rd, David Duguid, spoke in November 2017.

On 12 July 2018, O'Mara announced his resignation from the Labour Party. He said that he had "not been listened to or given a fair investigation" following his suspension, and that the party "no longer shares [his] commitment to the true definition of equality and compassion." Offering to help constituents with casework, he suggested that he would not step down as an MP. Despite his resignation, the Labour Party affirmed that it would continue to provide support for O'Mara; this was on the orders of Labour leader Jeremy Corbyn, who was concerned for O'Mara's welfare. In October 2018, O'Mara said the Labour Party had only made one adjustment for him, namely moving his office closer to the Commons chamber.

In a July 2019 statement, O'Mara said he had never been reinstated to the party, and that Corbyn had made "false reports about me being a mental health danger around parliament" after O'Mara had complained about not being able to arrange a meeting with the former's office.

=== Staff resignations ===
In March 2019, two of his aides resigned; he fired a further two members of staff, and a fifth resigned in solidarity. Three of the aides later took O'Mara to an employment tribunal over claims regarding holiday entitlement and breach of contract. After they accused him of using his mental health as an excuse to avoid difficult situations, he accused one of the aides of being "ableist". O'Mara's mother wrote to the court in June 2019 to say that her son was "destitute and penniless".

On 24 April 2019, O'Mara suspended constituent casework for a month, pending the move to a new constituency office and recruitment of new staff to replace the loss of his original team.

=== Sexual harassment allegation ===
On 27 July 2019, it was reported that O'Mara had sexually harassed a 20-year-old employee. O'Mara had sent WhatsApp messages to the employee, often late at night, in which he revealed his love for her, calling her "an angel", "a delicate little flower" and "effortlessly pretty". In a separate message to his constituency staff, O'Mara accused the Liberal Democrat prospective parliamentary candidate for his seat of believing in eugenics, and claimed that she had repressed sexual feelings for him.

=== Allegations of corruption ===
Following the staff resignations, in May 2019, O'Mara hired blogger and digital marketer Gareth Arnold as his new chief of staff. Under the pseudonyms 'Gareth Arnoult' and 'Geoff Stevens', Arnold had previously achieved some internet notability for setting up popular satirical fake news sites Britain Furst (satirising Britain First) and BFNN, and for a legal dispute with LADBible which the group withdrew. Arnold and O'Mara first met when O'Mara was managing the West Street Live bar, before his election.

On 23 July 2019, Arnold announced his resignation on O'Mara's Twitter account and criticised the MP. Arnold said that O'Mara was "the most disgustingly morally bankrupt person [he had] ever had the displeasure of working with" and had shown "vile, inexcusable contempt" for his constituents. He told O'Mara to call a by-election.

On 25 July 2019, O'Mara released a public statement, apologising "to everybody for everything". He said that he had been "bullied and mistreated" and "wasn't even meant to win the election", and claimed to have received "no support" from the Labour Party for his campaign. He said that he would be "taking time out to...deal with my mental health and personal issues regarding self-medication".

An investigation by the BBC revealed that Arnold was still working for O'Mara two weeks following his resignation, having "extended his notice period", and that staff hired in O'Mara's office had not received the security clearance required by parliamentary authorities.

Arnold referred O'Mara to the police in July 2019 over his expenses, after which the police raided O'Mara's office, seizing documents and computers. In mid-August 2019, O'Mara and Arnold were arrested on suspicion of fraud but released a day later subject to further investigation. In the criminal prosecution after O'Mara left office, Arnold was jointly charged with six of O'Mara's fraud offences.

In October 2019, one of O'Mara's constituents made a formal complaint to the Parliamentary Commissioner for Standards, alleging O'Mara had failed to act in the public interest and had used public money for his own benefit, and calling for a full investigation into his affairs.

=== Standing down ===
In July 2019, O'Mara said he would stand for re-election at the next general election, but later said he would stand down from the House of Commons after the 2019 parliamentary summer recess. He voted for the "Letwin amendment" and against the government during the special sitting of Parliament on 19 October 2019. Postponing his resignation until after October 2019, he eventually stood down at the December 2019 general election. He was succeeded as MP for Sheffield Hallam by Olivia Blake, the Labour Party candidate.

== After leaving Parliament ==
=== Revocation of parliamentary pass ===
In April 2021, the Parliamentary Independent Expert Panel, which determines "appeals and sanctions in cases where complaints have been brought against MPs of bullying, harassment or sexual misconduct", removed O'Mara's right to hold a parliamentary pass, meaning that he lost access to the Palace of Westminster. The report found that Ms Jennifer Barnes, who reported him, "felt and was subject to escalating behaviours that constitute sexual harassment" by O'Mara, and determined that

in light of the aggravating features, in particular the lack of remorse or insight and the refusal to engage, that the withdrawal of the Responder's [O'Mara's] right to a pass is the only appropriate and proportionate sanction that will mark the seriousness of the misconduct, address the harm caused to the Reporter by the Responder's misconduct, and send a signal about the misconduct which declares and upholds standards of behaviour.

=== Criminal prosecution ===
On 19 August 2021, the Crown Prosecution Service announced that O'Mara had been charged with seven counts of fraud by false representation. On 24 September 2021, O'Mara pleaded not guilty to those counts and an additional charge under the Proceeds of Crime Act. Arnold, who referred O'Mara to the police for the expenses in July 2019, was jointly charged with six of O'Mara's fraud offences.

In January 2023, on the first day of his trial at Leeds Crown Court, prosecutors alleged that O'Mara had attempted to claim falsely nearly £30,000 in a bid to fund "a significant cocaine habit". The court was shown messages between Arnold and O'Mara referencing O'Mara "do[ing] cocaine instead of going to Parliament".

£19,400 of the claims related to a fictitious charity, Confident About Autism South Yorkshire; the postcode given for the organisation corresponded with a McDonald's branch in Hillsborough. Additionally, O'Mara was accused of submitting to the Independent Parliamentary Standards Authority two invoices from Arnold for work he never completed. These invoices were either rejected or not processed.

A former case worker, who later took O'Mara to employment tribunal, told the court that O'Mara attended his Sheffield office "once, possibly twice" between November 2018 and April 2019, cancelled and missed parliamentary appointments, and showed signs of drug use at a meeting in February 2019. He also said that he protested to O'Mara when the MP approved contracts without prior vetting from the parliamentary authorities.

In his examination, Arnold told the court that O'Mara's election was "a massive shock", and that the MP became convinced that the Speaker, John Bercow, "had it in for him" and refused his expenses. Arnold said that the work he provided O'Mara was genuine, and that he would offer O'Mara media training by roleplaying as Jeremy Paxman. His second invoice was a "retainer" so that O'Mara could call him at any time. He said that he decided to resign after suspecting that O'Mara had drunk a litre of vodka before a BBC Look North interview that Arnold had arranged. He accused O'Mara of smoking sixty cigarettes a day at one stage. Arnold also told the court that O'Mara had submitted subject access requests to the Labour Party and Unite the Union, with a view to suing them under data protection law.

O'Mara's defence said that he failed to follow the correct processes because of administrative ignorance. They said that his claims were ignorant or incompetent, rather than dishonest, and that he believed that he was entitled to submit them given the genuine assistance he received. The defence further asked jurors to consider the effects of his mental health and autism. O'Mara declined to give evidence at the trial.

On 8 February 2023, O'Mara was found guilty of six counts of fraud, and not guilty of two counts. Arnold was found guilty on three counts of fraud, and not guilty on a further three. Of the counts of which O'Mara was cleared, one related to employing a friend, John Woodliff, as a constituency support officer. Woodliff had been jointly charged with one count of fraud, for which he was cleared. On 9 February 2023, O'Mara was sentenced to four years' imprisonment. Arnold was handed a fifteen-month term, suspended for two years. On 26 September 2023, O'Mara's appeal against his sentence was denied by the Court of Appeal.

Parliament of the United Kingdom
Preceded by Nick Clegg	Member of Parliament for Sheffield Hallam; 2017–2019	Succeeded by Olivia Blake
