= The Independents (UK) =

British political group

- Founded: 10 July 2019; 7 years ago
- Dissolved: 13 December 2019; 6 years ago
- Split from: Change UK
- Headquarters: 1 Mill Yard; Guildford Street; Luton; LU1 2NR
- Colours: Magenta
- Slogan: Independent together

Website
- theindependents.org.uk

The Independents were a group of independent MPs in the UK House of Commons that came together in July 2019. The group, which was not a registered political party, described itself as a "co-operative of independent politicians" who hoped to "encourage a stronger spirit of cross-party working" and "will work collaboratively in the national interest". As a technical group, The Independents did not have any formal policies, only providing administrative support to its members who were bound by its six key values of "country first, collaboration, integrity, respect, leadership and openness".

The group had five founding members, four who were elected as Labour MPs and one as a Conservative. When parliament was dissolved for the 2019 general election, two remained, three having left to join the Liberal Democrats.

== History ==
The group was formed on 10 July 2019 by five MPs, four of whom were among six MPs who left Change UK on 4 June. The four had been in Change UK since February 2019, having previously been members of the Labour Party (three of them) or the Conservative Party (one). (The others who left Change UK at that time, Chuka Umunna and Sarah Wollaston, joined the Liberal Democrats.) The fifth member of the new group, John Woodcock, had been suspended from Labour in 2018 over charges of sexual harassment and left the party while under investigation. He offered to have the charges investigated under the new group's procedures.

Following the formation of the group, member Heidi Allen said that it would not offer a policy platform; instead it would provide administrative functions and support to member MPs. She also stated that there was no intention for the group to become a political party.

Luciana Berger and Angela Smith left the group to join the Liberal Democrats in early September 2019, and Allen followed on 7 October 2019.

In the 2019 general election, Woodcock did not stand for reelection and Shuker ran unsuccessfully as an independent candidate. Former members Berger and Smith ran as Liberal Democrat candidates and were also unsuccessful; Allen did not stand for re-election.

== Members ==
The following MPs were members at the 2019 dissolution:

Name	Constituency	Joined	Notes
Gavin Shuker	Luton South	10 July 2019	Previously a member of Change UK; was elected as a Labour MP
John Woodcock	Barrow and Furness	10 July 2019	Was elected as a Labour MP

The following MPs had previously been members:

Name	Constituency	Joined	Left	Notes
Luciana Berger	Liverpool Wavertree	10 July 2019	5 September 2019	Previously a member of Change UK; was elected as a Labour MP. Joined the Liberal Democrats.
Angela Smith	Penistone and Stocksbridge	10 July 2019	7 September 2019	Previously a member of Change UK; was elected as a Labour MP. Joined the Liberal Democrats.
Heidi Allen	South Cambridgeshire	10 July 2019	7 October 2019	Previously a member of Change UK; was elected as a Conservative MP. Joined the Liberal Democrats.

== See also ==
- Independent Alliance (UK), A technical group formed in the 59th parliament
