= List of United Kingdom Liberal Democrat MPs (2017–2019) =

Twelve Liberal Democrat members of Parliament (MPs) were elected to the House of Commons of the United Kingdom at the 2017 general election. Stephen Lloyd resigned the whip in December 2018 to vote for May's withdrawal agreement, while former Labour and Change UK MP Chuka Umunna joined the party in June 2019 after quitting Change UK. Jane Dodds was elected on 1 August 2019 in the Brecon and Radnorshire by-election. Former Conservative and Change UK MP Sarah Wollaston joined the party on 14 August 2019. Phillip Lee crossed the floor from the Conservative Party on 3 September 2019 due to disagreements over the Conservatives' handling of Brexit, followed by former Labour and Change UK independent Luciana Berger two days later. Two days after Berger's defection Angela Smith, another former Labour and Change UK independent, also joined the Lib Dems. On 14 September, at the start of the Liberal Democrats conference in Bournemouth, Sam Gyimah defected to the party from the Conservatives. On 7 October, former Change UK leader (and, before that, Conservative MP) Heidi Allen joined the Liberal Democrats, becoming their 19th MP. Stephen Lloyd was elected as a Liberal Democrat but resigned the Liberal Democrat whip in order to support the proposed European Union withdrawal agreement; he sat as an independent from 6 December 2018, though he remained a party member, until he asked to re-take the whip on 29 October 2019. On 31 October 2019 expelled Conservative MP Antoinette Sandbach became the 21st Liberal Democrat MP.

== MPs ==
Name	Parliamentary roles	Age	Time in Parliament	Constituency	Majority & 2017 affiliation	State party (Note: See article 2.1 of The Federal Constitution of the Liberal Democrats)	Regional party
Jo Swinson	Leader	46	2005–2015; 2017–2019	East Dunbartonshire	5,339	Scotland	
Ed Davey	Deputy Leader	60	1997–2015; 2017–present	Kingston and Surbiton	4,124	England	London
Ed Davey	Shadow Chancellor of the Exchequer	60	1997–2015; 2017–present	Kingston and Surbiton	4,124	England	London
Chuka Umunna	Shadow Secretary of State for Foreign and Commonwealth Affairs	47	2010–2019 (Note: Elected as a Labour MP; resigned from the Labour Party on 18 February 2019 to jointly found The Independent Group (later styled Change UK); resigned from Change UK on 4 June 2019; joined the Liberal Democrats on 13 June 2019.)	Streatham	26,285	England	London
Chuka Umunna	Shadow Secretary of State for International Trade	47	2010–2019	Streatham	26,285	England	London
Christine Jardine	Shadow Secretary of State for the Home Department	65	2017–present	Edinburgh West	2,988	Scotland	
Christine Jardine	Shadow Secretary of State for Women and Equalities	65	2017–present	Edinburgh West	2,988	Scotland	
Christine Jardine	Deputy Chief Whip	65	2017–present	Edinburgh West	2,988	Scotland	
Tom Brake	Shadow Secretary of State for Exiting the European Union	64	1997–2019	Carshalton and Wallington	1,369	England	London
Tom Brake	Shadow Chancellor of the Duchy of Lancaster	64	1997–2019	Carshalton and Wallington	1,369	England	London
Jamie Stone	Shadow Secretary of State for Defence	72	2017–present	Caithness, Sutherland and Easter Ross	2,044	Scotland	
Jamie Stone	Shadow Secretary of State for Scotland	72	2017–present	Caithness, Sutherland and Easter Ross	2,044	Scotland	
Vince Cable	Shadow Minister for the Cabinet Office	83	1997–2015; 2017–2019	Twickenham	9,762	England	London
Layla Moran	Shadow Secretary of State for Education	43	2017–present	Oxford West and Abingdon	816	England	South Central
Layla Moran	Shadow Secretary of State for Digital, Culture, Media and Sport	43	2017–present	Oxford West and Abingdon	816	England	South Central
Wera Hobhouse	Shadow Secretary for Environment and Food	66	2017–present	Bath	5,694	England	Western Counties
Wera Hobhouse	Shadow Secretary for Climate Emergency	66	2017–present	Bath	5,694	England	Western Counties
Wera Hobhouse	Shadow Secretary of State for Transport	66	2017–present	Bath	5,694	England	Western Counties
Tim Farron	Shadow Secretary of State for Housing, Communities and Local Government	56	2005–present	Westmorland and Lonsdale	777	England	North West
Tim Farron	Shadow Secretary of State for Work and Pensions	56	2005–present	Westmorland and Lonsdale	777	England	North West
Tim Farron	North of England (Northern Powerhouse) spokesperson	56	2005–present	Westmorland and Lonsdale	777	England	North West
Alistair Carmichael	Chief Whip	60	2001–present	Orkney and Shetland	4,563	Scotland	
Alistair Carmichael	Shadow Secretary of State for Northern Ireland	60	2001–present	Orkney and Shetland	4,563	Scotland	
Jane Dodds	Leader of the Welsh Liberal Democrats	62	2019	Brecon and Radnorshire	1,425	Wales	
Jane Dodds	Shadow Secretary of State for Wales	62	2019	Brecon and Radnorshire	1,425	Wales	
Jane Dodds	Shadow Secretary for Rural Affairs	62	2019	Brecon and Radnorshire	1,425	Wales	
Norman Lamb	Chair of the Science and Technology Select Committee	68	2001–2019	North Norfolk	3,512	England	East of England
Sarah Wollaston	Chair of the Health and Social Care Select Committee	64	2010–2019 (Note: Elected as a Conservative MP; defected to The Independent Group on 20 February 2019; resigned from Change UK on 4 June 2019; joined the Liberal Democrats on 14 August 2019.)	Totnes	13,477	England	Devon and Cornwall
Sarah Wollaston	Chair of the Liaison Committee	64	2010–2019	Totnes	13,477	England	Devon and Cornwall
Phillip Lee	Shadow Secretary of State for Justice	55	2010–2019 (Note: Elected as a Conservative MP; defected to the Liberal Democrats on 3 September 2019.)	Bracknell	16,016	England	South Central
Luciana Berger	Shadow Secretary of State for Health and Social Care	45	2010–2019 (Note: Elected as a Labour and Co-operative MP; resigned from the Labour Party on 18 February 2019 to jointly found The Independent Group; resigned from Change UK on 4 June 2019; jointly founded The Independents (a technical group) on 10 June 2019; defected to the Liberal Democrats on 5 September 2019.)	Liverpool Wavertree	29,466	England	North West
Angela Smith	Shadow Secretary of State for International Development	64	2005–2019 (Note: Elected as a Labour MP; resigned from the Labour Party on 18 February 2019 to jointly found The Independent Group; resigned from Change UK on 4 June 2019; jointly founded The Independents on 10 June 2019; defected to the Liberal Democrats on 7 September 2019.)	Penistone and Stockbridge (Note: Represented Sheffield Hillsborough from 2005–2010 (constituency abolished and partially incorporated into Penistone and Stockbridge in 2010).)	1,322	England	Yorkshire and the Humber
Sam Gyimah	Shadow Secretary of State for Business, Energy and Industrial Strategy	49	2010–2019 (Note: Elected as a Conservative MP; had the Conservative whip removed on 3 September 2019; joined the Liberal Democrats on 14 September 2019.)	East Surrey	23,914	England	South East
Heidi Allen	none	51	2015–2019 (Note: Elected as a Conservative MP; resigned from the Conservative party on 20 February 2019, joining and later serving as leader of Change UK; resigned from Change UK on 4 June 2019; joined the Liberal Democrats on 7 October 2019.)	South Cambridgeshire	15,952	England	East of England
Stephen Lloyd	none	69	2010–2015; 2017–2019 (Note: Elected as a Liberal Democrat MP; resigned party whip on 6 December 2018, but remained a party member, and asked to re-take the whip on 29 October 2019.)	Eastbourne	1,609	England	South East
Antoinette Sandbach	none	57	2015–2019 (Note: Elected as a Conservative MP; had the Conservative whip removed on 3 September 2019; joined the Liberal Democrats on 31 October 2019.)	Eddisbury	11,942	England	North West

== See also ==
- List of MPs elected in the 2017 United Kingdom general election
- List of MPs for constituencies in England (2017–2019)
- List of MPs for constituencies in Northern Ireland (2017–2019)
- List of MPs for constituencies in Scotland (2017–2019)
- List of MPs for constituencies in Wales (2017–2019)
- Category:UK MPs 2017–2019

== Sources ==
- "Results". BBC News. 9 June 2017.
- "New Lib Dem spokespersons team announced". 12 October 2017 – via markpack.org.uk.
