= List of MPs for constituencies in Wales (2017–2019) =

- Colours on map indicate the party allegiance of each constituency's MP after 2017 general election.

This is a list of members of Parliament (MPs) elected to the House of Commons of the United Kingdom by Welsh constituencies for the fifty-seventh Parliament of the United Kingdom (2017 to 2019).

It includes both MPs elected at the 2017 general election, held on 8 June 2017, and those subsequently elected in by-elections. At the 2017 general election, Welsh Labour was the largest party with 28 MPs. Conservatives were 2nd with 8 MPs and Plaid Cymru had 4.

The list is sorted by the name of the MP, and MPs who did not serve throughout the Parliament are italicised. New MPs elected since the general election are noted at the bottom of the page.

== Composition ==
Wales Parliamentary Constituency prior to 2019 dissolution

Affiliation	Members
Welsh Labour Party	28
Welsh Conservative Party	6
Plaid Cymru	4
Welsh Liberal Democrats	1
Independent	1
Total	40

Number of seats by party
1. Welsh Labour (70%)
2. Welsh Conservative (15%)
3. Plaid Cymru (10%)
4. Welsh Liberal Democrats (2.5%)
5. Independent (2.5%)

== MPs ==
MP	Constituency	Party	In constituency since	Majority
Tonia Antoniazzi	Gower	Labour	2017	3,269
Guto Bebb	Aberconwy	Independent (suspended from Conservatives) (Note: 21 Conservative MPs were suspended by their party on 3 September 2019 after voting against the government in the emergency European Union (Withdrawal) debate. They now sit as independents.)	2010	635
Kevin Brennan	Cardiff West	Labour	2001	12,551
Chris Bryant	Rhondda	Labour	2001	13,746
Alun Cairns	Vale of Glamorgan	Conservative	2010	2,190
Ann Clwyd	Cynon Valley	Labour	1984 by-election	13,238
Stephen Crabb	Preseli Pembrokeshire	Conservative	2005	314
Wayne David	Caerphilly	Labour	2001	12,078
David Davies	Monmouth	Conservative	2005	8,206
Geraint Davies	Swansea West	Labour/Co-operative	2010	10,598
Glyn Davies	Montgomeryshire	Conservative	2010	9,285
Jane Dodds	Brecon and Radnorshire	Liberal Democrats	2019 by-election	1,425
Stephen Doughty	Cardiff South and Penarth	Labour/Co-operative	2012 by-election	14,864
Jonathan Edwards	Carmarthen East and Dinefwr	Plaid Cymru	2010	3,908
Chris Elmore	Ogmore	Labour	2016 by-election	13,871
Chris Evans	Islwyn	Labour/Co-operative	2010	11,412
Nia Griffith	Llanelli	Labour	2005	12,024
David Hanson	Delyn	Labour	1992	4,240
Carolyn Harris	Swansea East	Labour	2015	13,168
Simon Hart	Carmarthen West and South Pembrokeshire	Conservative	2010	3,110
David Jones	Clwyd West	Conservative	2005	3,437
Gerald Jones	Merthyr Tydfil and Rhymney	Labour	2015	16,334
Ruth Jones	Newport West	Labour	2019 by-election	1,951
Susan Jones	Clwyd South	Labour	2010	4,356
Stephen Kinnock	Aberavon	Labour	2015	16,761
Ben Lake	Ceredigion	Plaid Cymru	2017	104
Ian Lucas	Wrexham	Labour	2001	1,832
Anna McMorrin	Cardiff North	Labour	2017	4,174
Madeleine Moon	Bridgend	Labour	2005	4,700
Jessica Morden	Newport East	Labour	2005	8,003
Albert Owen	Ynys Môn	Labour	2001	5,259
Christina Rees	Neath	Labour	2015	12,631
Chris Ruane	Vale of Clwyd	Labour	2017	2,379
Liz Saville-Roberts	Dwyfor Meirionnydd	Plaid Cymru	2015	4,850
Nick Smith	Blaenau Gwent	Labour	2010	11,907
Owen Smith	Pontypridd	Labour	2010	11,448
Jo Stevens	Cardiff Central	Labour	2015	17,196
Mark Tami	Alyn and Deeside	Labour	2001	5,235
Nick Thomas-Symonds	Torfaen	Labour	2015	10,240
Hywel Williams	Arfon	Plaid Cymru	2001	92

== By-elections ==
- 2019 Newport West by-election
- 2019 Brecon and Radnorshire by-election

== See also ==
- 2017 United Kingdom general election
- List of MPs elected in the 2017 United Kingdom general election
- List of MPs for constituencies in England (2017–2019)
- List of MPs for constituencies in Northern Ireland (2017–2019)
- List of MPs for constituencies in Scotland (2017–2019)
