= List of MPs for constituencies in England (2017–2019) =

- Colours on map indicate the party allegiance of each constituency's MP

This is a list of members of Parliament (MPs) elected to the House of Commons of the United Kingdom by English constituencies for the Fifty-Seventh Parliament of the United Kingdom (2017–2019).

It includes both MPs elected at the 2017 general election, held on 8 June 2017, and those subsequently elected in by-elections.

The list is sorted by the name of the MP, and MPs who did not serve throughout the Parliament are italicised. New MPs elected since the general election are noted at the bottom of the page.

== Composition ==
=== Election ===
Affiliation	Members
Conservative Party	296
Labour Party	227
Liberal Democrats	8
Green Party	1
Speaker	1
Total	533

Number of seats by party (at election)
1. Conservative (55.7%)
2. Labour (42.6%)
3. Liberal Democrat (1.50%)

=== At dissolution ===
Affiliation	Members
Conservative Party	269
Labour Party	212
Liberal Democrats	16
Change UK	5
The Independents	2
Green Party	1
Birkenhead Social Justice Party	1
Independent	25
Speaker	1
Total	533

Number of seats by party (At Dissolution)
1. Conservative (50.7%)
2. Labour (39.8%)
3. Liberal Democrat (2.63%)
4. Change UK (0.94%)
5. The Independents (0.38%)
6. Green Party (0.19%)
7. Birkenhead Social Justice (0.19%)
8. Independent (5.25%)
9. Speaker (0.19%)

== MPs in the East of England region ==
Affiliation	Members
Conservative	46
Labour	5
Liberal Democrats	2
The Independents	1
Independent	4
Total	58

MP	Constituency	Party	In constituency since
Bim Afolami	Hitchin and Harpenden	Conservative	2017
Peter Aldous	Waveney	Conservative	2010
Heidi Allen	South Cambridgeshire	Liberal Democrats (prev. Conservative, Change UK and The Independents) (Note: Allen quit the Conservatives in February 2019 to join The Independent Group (later Change UK), before quitting to become an independent MP in June 2019. The following month, she founded The Independents with four other MPs and then defected to the Liberal Democrats in October 2019.)	2015
David Amess	Southend West	Conservative	2010
Richard Bacon	South Norfolk	Conservative	2001
Kemi Badenoch	Saffron Walden	Conservative	2017
Steve Barclay	North East Cambridgeshire	Conservative	2010
John Baron	Basildon and Billericay	Conservative	2010
Henry Bellingham	North West Norfolk	Conservative	2001
Alex Burghart	Brentwood and Ongar	Conservative	2017
Alistair Burt	North East Bedfordshire	Independent (suspended from Conservatives) (Note: 21 Conservative MPs were suspended by their party on 3 September 2019 after voting against the government in the emergency European Union (Withdrawal) debate. They sat as independents.)	2001
James Cartlidge	South Suffolk	Conservative	2015
Jo Churchill	Bury St Edmunds	Conservative	2010
James Cleverly	Braintree	Conservative	2015
Therese Coffey	Suffolk Coastal	Conservative	2010
Jonathan Djanogly	Huntingdon	Conservative	2001
Nadine Dorries	Mid Bedfordshire	Conservative	2010
Oliver Dowden	Hertsmere	Conservative	2015
Jackie Doyle-Price	Thurrock	Conservative	2010
James Duddridge	Rochford and Southend East	Conservative	2005
Lisa Forbes	Peterborough	Labour	2019
Mark Francois	Rayleigh and Wickford	Conservative	2010
Vicky Ford	Chelmsford	Conservative	2017
Lucy Frazer	South East Cambridgeshire	Conservative	2015
George Freeman	Mid Norfolk	Conservative	2010
David Gauke	South West Hertfordshire	Independent (suspended from Conservatives)	2005
Robert Halfon	Harlow	Conservative	2010
Matt Hancock	West Suffolk	Conservative	2010
Richard Harrington	Watford	Independent (suspended from Conservatives)	2010
Rebecca Harris	Castle Point	Conservative	2010
Oliver Heald	North East Hertfordshire	Conservative	1992
Kelvin Hopkins	Luton North	Independent (suspended from Labour) (Note: Hopkins was suspended from Labour in November 2017 after being accused of sexual misconduct.)	1997
Bernard Jenkin	Harwich and North Essex	Conservative	2010
Eleanor Laing	Epping Forest	Conservative	1997
Norman Lamb	North Norfolk	Liberal Democrats	2001
Brandon Lewis	Great Yarmouth	Conservative	2010
Clive Lewis	Norwich South	Labour	2015
Anne Main	St Albans	Conservative	2005
Sandy Martin	Ipswich	Labour	2017
Stephen McPartland	Stevenage	Conservative	2010
Stephen Metcalfe	South Basildon and East Thurrock	Conservative	2010
Priti Patel	Witham	Conservative	2010
Mike Penning	Hemel Hempstead	Conservative	2005
Daniel Poulter	Central Suffolk and North Ipswich	Conservative	2010
Mark Prisk	Hertford and Stortford	Conservative	2001
Will Quince	Colchester	Conservative	2015
Andrew Selous	South West Bedfordshire	Conservative	2001
Grant Shapps	Welwyn Hatfield	Conservative	2005
Gavin Shuker	Luton South	The Independents (prev. Labour Co-op, Change UK and Independent) (Note: Shuker quit Labour in February 2019 to join The Independent Group (later Change UK), before quitting to become an independent MP in June 2019. The following month, he founded The Independents with four other MPs.)	2010
Keith Simpson	Broadland	Conservative	2010
Chloe Smith	Norwich North	Conservative	2009 by-election
Liz Truss	South West Norfolk	Conservative	2010
Shailesh Vara	North West Cambridgeshire	Conservative	2005
Charles Walker	Broxbourne	Conservative	2005
Giles Watling	Clacton	Conservative	2017
John Whittingdale	Maldon	Conservative	2010
Mohammad Yasin	Bedford	Labour	2017
Daniel Zeichner	Cambridge	Labour	2015

== MPs in the East Midlands region ==
Affiliation	Members
Conservative	28
Labour	13
Change UK	2
Independent	3
Total	46

MP	Constituency	Party	In constituency since
Edward Argar	Charnwood	Conservative	2015
Jon Ashworth	Leicester South	Labour	2011 by-election
Victoria Atkins	Louth and Horncastle	Conservative	2015
Margaret Beckett	Derby South	Labour	1983
Nick Boles	Grantham and Stamford	Independent (prev. Conservative) (Note: In April 2019, Boles quit the Conservatives to sit as an independent MP. He described himself as an "Independent Progressive Conservative".)	2010
Peter Bone	Wellingborough	Conservative	2005
Ben Bradley	Mansfield	Conservative	2017
Andrew Bridgen	North West Leicestershire	Conservative	2010
Kenneth Clarke	Rushcliffe	Independent (suspended from Conservatives)	1970
Vernon Coaker	Gedling	Labour	1997
Alberto Costa	South Leicestershire	Conservative	2015
Gloria De Piero	Ashfield	Labour	2010
Alan Duncan	Rutland and Melton	Conservative	1992
Michael Ellis	Northampton North	Conservative	2010
Ruth George	High Peak	Labour	2017
Lilian Greenwood	Nottingham South	Labour	2010
John Hayes	South Holland and The Deepings	Conservative	1997
Chris Heaton-Harris	Daventry	Conservative	2010
Philip Hollobone	Kettering	Conservative	2010
Robert Jenrick	Newark	Conservative	2014 by-election
Caroline Johnson	Sleaford and North Hykeham	Conservative	2016 by-election
Liz Kendall	Leicester West	Labour	2010
Pauline Latham	Mid Derbyshire	Conservative	2010
Andrea Leadsom	South Northamptonshire	Conservative	2010
Karen Lee	Lincoln	Labour	2017
Sir Edward Leigh	Gainsborough	Conservative	1983
Chris Leslie	Nottingham East	Change UK (prev. Labour Co-op) (Note: Leslie quit Labour in February 2019 to join The Independent Group (later Change UK).)	2010
Andrew Lewer	Northampton South	Conservative	2017
John Mann	Bassetlaw	Labour	2001
Patrick McLoughlin	Derbyshire Dales	Conservative	2010
Nigel Mills	Amber Valley	Conservative	2010
Nicky Morgan	Loughborough	Conservative	2010
Alex Norris	Nottingham North	Labour	2017
Neil O'Brien	Harborough	Conservative	2017
Toby Perkins	Chesterfield	Labour	2010
Tom Pursglove	Corby	Conservative	2015
Lee Rowley	North East Derbyshire	Conservative	2017
Dennis Skinner	Bolsover	Labour	1970
Anna Soubry	Broxtowe	Change UK (prev. Conservative) (Note: Soubry quit the Conservatives in February 2019 to join The Independent Group (later Change UK).)	2010
Mark Spencer	Sherwood	Conservative	2010
Maggie Throup	Erewash	Conservative	2015
David Tredinnick	Bosworth	Conservative	1987
Keith Vaz	Leicester East	Labour	1987
Matt Warman	Boston and Skegness	Conservative	2015
Heather Wheeler	South Derbyshire	Conservative	2010
Chris Williamson	Derby North	Independent (suspended from Labour) (Note: Williamson was suspended from Labour in February 2019, pending investigation into alleged antisemitism. He was readmitted on 26 June 2019, but had the whip removed again two days later.)	2010 (Note: Williamson was defeated in the 2015 election and re-entered the House in the 2017 election.)

== MPs in the London region ==
Affiliation	Members
Labour	46
Conservative	19
Liberal Democrats	4
Change UK	2
Independent	2
Total	73

MP	Constituency	Party	In constituency since
Diane Abbott	Hackney North and Stoke Newington	Labour	1987
Rushanara Ali	Bethnal Green and Bow	Labour	2010
Rosena Allin-Khan	Tooting	Labour	2016 by-election
Bob Blackman	Harrow East	Conservative	2010
Tom Brake	Carshalton and Wallington	Liberal Democrats	1997
James Brokenshire	Old Bexley and Sidcup	Conservative	2010
Lyn Brown	West Ham	Labour	2005
Karen Buck	Westminster North	Labour	2010
Dawn Butler	Brent Central	Labour	2015
Vince Cable	Twickenham	Liberal Democrats	2017 (Note: Cable was defeated in the 2015 election and re-entered the House in the 2017 election.)
Ruth Cadbury	Brentford and Isleworth	Labour	2015
Bambos Charalambous	Enfield Southgate	Labour	2017
Jeremy Corbyn	Islington North	Labour	1983
Neil Coyle	Bermondsey and Old Southwark	Labour	2015
Stella Creasy	Walthamstow	Labour Co-op	2010
Jon Cruddas	Dagenham and Rainham	Labour	2010
John Cryer	Leyton and Wanstead	Labour	2010
Janet Daby	Lewisham East	Labour	2018 by-election
Ed Davey	Kingston and Surbiton	Liberal Democrats	2017 (Note: Davey was defeated in the 2015 election and re-entered the House in the 2017 election.)
Marsha de Cordova	Battersea	Labour	2017
Emma Dent Coad	Kensington	Labour	2017
Julia Dockerill	Hornchurch and Upminster	Conservative	2017
Iain Duncan Smith	Chingford and Woodford Green	Conservative	1997
Clive Efford	Eltham	Labour	1997
David Evennett	Bexleyheath and Crayford	Conservative	2005
Mark Field	Cities of London and Westminster	Conservative	2001
Jim Fitzpatrick	Poplar and Limehouse	Labour	2010
Vicky Foxcroft	Lewisham Deptford	Labour	2015
Mike Freer	Finchley and Golders Green	Conservative	2010
Mike Gapes	Ilford South	Change UK (prev. Labour Co-op) (Note: Gapes quit Labour in February 2019 to join The Independent Group (later Change UK).)	1992
Barry Gardiner	Brent North	Labour	1997
Zac Goldsmith	Richmond Park	Conservative	2010 (Note: Goldsmith resigned in 2016 due to the Government's October 2016 decision to approve a third runway at Heathrow Airport, ran in the subsequent by-election as an independent and was defeated. He re-entered the House as a Conservative in the 2017 election.)
Justine Greening	Putney	Independent (suspended from Conservatives)	2005
Stephen Hammond	Wimbledon	Independent (suspended from Conservatives)	2005
Greg Hands	Chelsea and Fulham	Conservative	2010
Harriet Harman	Camberwell and Peckham	Labour	1997
Helen Hayes	Dulwich and West Norwood	Labour	2015
Meg Hillier	Hackney South and Shoreditch	Labour Co-op	2005
Margaret Hodge	Barking	Labour	1994 by-election
Kate Hoey	Vauxhall	Labour	1989 by-election
Rupa Huq	Ealing Central and Acton	Labour	2015
Nick Hurd	Ruislip, Northwood and Pinner	Conservative	2010
Boris Johnson	Uxbridge and South Ruislip	Conservative	2015
Jo Johnson	Orpington	Conservative	2010
Sarah Jones	Croydon Central	Labour	2017
David Lammy	Tottenham	Labour	2000 by-election
Seema Malhotra	Feltham and Heston	Labour	2011 by-election
Siobhain McDonagh	Mitcham and Morden	Labour	1997
John McDonnell	Hayes and Harlington	Labour	1997
Bob Neill	Bromley and Chislehurst	Conservative	2006 by-election
Matthew Offord	Hendon	Conservative	2010
Kate Osamor	Edmonton	Labour Co-op	2015
Teresa Pearce	Erith and Thamesmead	Labour	2010
Matthew Pennycook	Greenwich and Woolwich	Labour	2015
Chris Philp	Croydon South	Conservative	2015
Stephen Pound	Ealing North	Labour	1997
Steve Reed	Croydon North	Labour	2012 by-election
Ellie Reeves	Lewisham West and Penge	Labour	2017
Andrew Rosindell	Romford	Conservative	2001
Joan Ryan	Enfield North	Change UK (prev. Labour) (Note: Ryan quit Labour in February 2019 to join The Independent Group (later Change UK).)	2015
Paul Scully	Sutton and Cheam	Conservative	2015
Virendra Sharma	Ealing Southall	Labour	2007 by-election
Tulip Siddiq	Hampstead and Kilburn	Labour	2015
Andy Slaughter	Hammersmith	Labour	2010
Keir Starmer	Holborn and St Pancras	Labour	2015
Bob Stewart	Beckenham	Conservative	2010
Wes Streeting	Ilford North	Labour	2015
Gareth Thomas	Harrow West	Labour Co-op	1997
Emily Thornberry	Islington South and Finsbury	Labour	2005
Stephen Timms	East Ham	Labour	1997
Chuka Umunna	Streatham	Liberal Democrats (prev. Labour) (Note: Umunna quit Labour in February 2019 to join The Independent Group (later Change UK), before quitting in June 2019 and then joining the Liberal Democrats that same month.)	2010
Theresa Villiers	Chipping Barnet	Conservative	2005
Catherine West	Hornsey and Wood Green	Labour	2015

== MPs in the North East region ==
Affiliation	Members
Labour	26
Conservative	3
Total	29

MP	Constituency	Party	In constituency since
Roberta Blackman-Woods	City of Durham	Labour	2005
Nick Brown	Newcastle upon Tyne East	Labour	2010
Alan Campbell	Tynemouth	Labour	1997
Ronnie Campbell	Blyth Valley	Labour	1987
Jenny Chapman	Darlington	Labour	2010
Simon Clarke	Middlesbrough South and East Cleveland	Conservative	2017
Alex Cunningham	Stockton North	Labour	2010
Julie Elliott	Sunderland Central	Labour	2010
Mary Glindon	North Tyneside	Labour	2010
Helen Goodman	Bishop Auckland	Labour	2005
Stephen Hepburn	Jarrow	Labour	1997
Mike Hill	Hartlepool	Labour	2017
Sharon Hodgson	Washington and Sunderland West	Labour	2010
Kevan Jones	North Durham	Labour	2001
Ian Lavery	Wansbeck	Labour	2010
Emma Lewell-Buck	South Shields	Labour	2013 by-election
Andy McDonald	Middlesbrough	Labour	2012 by-election
Catherine McKinnell	Newcastle upon Tyne North	Labour	2010
Ian Mearns	Gateshead	Labour	2010
Grahame Morris	Easington	Labour	2010
Chi Onwurah	Newcastle upon Tyne Central	Labour	2010
Guy Opperman	Hexham	Conservative	2010
Bridget Phillipson	Houghton and Sunderland South	Labour	2010
Laura Pidcock	North West Durham	Labour	2017
Anne-Marie Trevelyan	Berwick-upon-Tweed	Conservative	2015
Anna Turley	Redcar	Labour	2015
Liz Twist	Blaydon	Labour	2017
Paul Williams	Stockton South	Labour	2017
Phil Wilson	Sedgefield	Labour	2007 by-election

== MPs in the North West region ==
Affiliation	Members
Labour	48
Conservative	18
Liberal Democrats	3
Change UK	1
The Independents	1
Birkenhead Social Justice	1
Independent	3
Total	75

MP	Constituency	Party	In constituency since
Debbie Abrahams	Oldham East and Saddleworth	Labour	2011 by-election
Mike Amesbury	Weaver Vale	Labour	2017
Luciana Berger	Liverpool Wavertree	Liberal Democrats (prev. Labour Co-op, Change UK and The Independents) (Note: Berger quit Labour in February 2019 to join The Independent Group (later Change UK), before quitting to become an independent MP in June 2019. The following month, she founded The Independents with four other MPs, before joining the Liberal Democrats in September.)	2010
Jake Berry	Rossendale and Darwen	Conservative	2010
Graham Brady	Altrincham and Sale West	Conservative	1997
Fiona Bruce	Congleton	Conservative	2010
Dan Carden	Liverpool Walton	Labour	2017
Ann Coffey	Stockport	Change UK (prev. Labour) (Note: Coffey quit Labour in February 2019 to join The Independent Group (later Change UK).)	1992
Julie Cooper	Burnley	Labour	2015
Rosie Cooper	West Lancashire	Labour	2005
David Crausby	Bolton North East	Labour	1997
Peter Dowd	Bootle	Labour	2015
Angela Eagle	Wallasey	Labour	1992
Maria Eagle	Garston and Halewood	Labour	2010
Louise Ellman	Liverpool Riverside	Independent (prev. Labour Co-op) (Note: Ellman quit Labour in October 2019 and sat as an independent MP.)	1997
Bill Esterson	Sefton Central	Labour	2010
Nigel Evans	Ribble Valley	Conservative	1992
Tim Farron	Westmorland and Lonsdale	Liberal Democrats	2005
Frank Field	Birkenhead	Birkenhead Social; Justice Party (prev. Labour) (Note: Field quit Labour in August 2018 to sit as an independent MP. In August 2019, he founded his own party, the Birkenhead Social Justice Party.)	1979
Yvonne Fovargue	Makerfield	Labour	2010
James Frith	Bury North	Labour	2017
Chris Green	Bolton West	Conservative	2015
Kate Green	Stretford and Urmston	Labour	2010
Margaret Greenwood	Wirral West	Labour	2015
Andrew Gwynne	Denton and Reddish	Labour	2005
Trudy Harrison	Copeland	Conservative	2017 by-election
Sue Hayman	Workington	Labour	2015
Mark Hendrick	Preston	Labour Co-op	2000 by-election
Kate Hollern	Blackburn	Labour	2015
George Howarth	Knowsley	Labour	2010
Lindsay Hoyle	Chorley	Labour	1997
Graham Jones	Hyndburn	Labour	2010
Helen Jones	Warrington North	Labour	1997
Mike Kane	Wythenshawe and Sale East	Labour	2014 by-election
Barbara Keeley	Worsley and Eccles South	Labour	2010
Seema Kennedy	South Ribble	Conservative	2015
Afzal Khan	Manchester Gorton	Labour	2017
Ivan Lewis	Bury South	Independent (prev. Labour)	1997
Tony Lloyd	Rochdale	Labour	2017 (Note: Lloyd previously served in the House as the Member for Stretford from 1983–1997 and the Member for Manchester Central from 1997–2012.)
Rebecca Long-Bailey	Salford and Eccles	Labour	2015
Justin Madders	Ellesmere Port and Neston	Labour	2015
Gordon Marsden	Blackpool South	Labour	1997
Chris Matheson	City of Chester	Labour	2015
Paul Maynard	Blackpool North and Cleveleys	Conservative	2010
Conor McGinn	St Helens North	Labour	2015
Alison McGovern	Wirral South	Labour	2010
Liz McInnes	Heywood and Middleton	Labour	2014 by-election
Jim McMahon	Oldham West and Royton	Labour Co-op	2015 by-election
Esther McVey	Tatton	Conservative	2017 (Note: McVey previously served in the House as the Member for Wirral West from 2010–2015.)
Mark Menzies	Fylde	Conservative	2010
Damien Moore	Southport	Conservative	2017
David Morris	Morecambe and Lunesdale	Conservative	2010
Lisa Nandy	Wigan	Labour	2010
Jo Platt	Leigh	Labour Co-op	2017
Lucy Powell	Manchester Central	Labour Co-op	2012 by-election
Yasmin Qureshi	Bolton South East	Labour	2010
Faisal Rashid	Warrington South	Labour	2017
Angela Rayner	Ashton-under-Lyne	Labour	2015
Jonathan Reynolds	Stalybridge and Hyde	Labour Co-op	2010
Marie Rimmer	St Helens South and Whiston	Labour	2015
Mary Robinson	Cheadle	Conservative	2015
David Rutley	Macclesfield	Conservative	2010
Antoinette Sandbach	Eddisbury	Liberal Democrats (prev. Conservatives and independent)	2015
Cat Smith	Lancaster and Fleetwood	Labour	2015
Laura Smith	Crewe and Nantwich	Labour	2017
Jeff Smith	Manchester Withington	Labour	2015
Andrew Stephenson	Pendle	Conservative	2010
John Stevenson	Carlisle	Conservative	2010
Rory Stewart	Penrith and The Border	Independent (suspended from Conservatives)	2015
Graham Stringer	Blackley and Broughton	Labour	2010
Derek Twigg	Halton	Labour	1997
Stephen Twigg	Liverpool West Derby	Labour Co-op	2010
Ben Wallace	Wyre and Preston North	Conservative	2010
John Woodcock	Barrow and Furness	The Independents (prev. Labour Co-op) (Note: Woodcock was suspended from Labour in April 2018 after being accused of sexual misconduct. In July 2018, he quit the party to sit as an independent MP. In June 2019, he founded The Independents with four other MPs.)	2010
William Wragg	Hazel Grove	Conservative	2015

== MPs in the South East region ==
Affiliation	Members
Conservative	59
Labour	8
Liberal Democrats	4
Green	1
Speaker	1
Independent	11
Total	84

MP	Constituency	Party	In constituency since
Adam Afriyie	Windsor	Conservative	2005
Steve Baker	Wycombe	Conservative	2010
Richard Benyon	Newbury	Independent (suspended from Conservatives)	2005
John Bercow	Buckingham	Speaker	1997
Sir Paul Beresford	Mole Valley	Conservative	1997
Crispin Blunt	Reigate	Conservative	1997
Sir Peter Bottomley	Worthing West	Conservative	1997
Steve Brine	Winchester	Independent (suspended from Conservatives)	2010
Maria Caulfield	Lewes	Conservative	2015
Rehman Chishti	Gillingham and Rainham	Conservative	2010
Greg Clark	Tunbridge Wells	Independent (suspended from Conservatives)	2005
Damian Collins	Folkestone and Hythe	Conservative	2010
Robert Courts	Witney	Conservative	2016 by-election
Tracey Crouch	Chatham and Aylesford	Conservative	2010
Mims Davies	Eastleigh	Conservative	2015
Tan Dhesi	Slough	Labour	2017
Caroline Dinenage	Gosport	Conservative	2010
Leo Docherty	Aldershot	Conservative	2017
Anneliese Dodds	Oxford East	Labour Co-op	2017
Rosie Duffield	Canterbury	Labour	2017
Charlie Elphicke	Dover	Independent (suspended from Conservatives) (Note: Elphicke was suspended from the Conservatives in November 2017 after being accused of sexual assault, before being reinstated in December 2018. In July 2019, he again had the whip removed after legal charges were brought against him by the Crown Prosecution Service.)	2010
Michael Fallon	Sevenoaks	Conservative	1997
Suella Fernandes	Fareham	Conservative	2015
Sir Roger Gale	North Thanet	Conservative	1983
Nus Ghani	Wealden	Conservative	2015
Nick Gibb	Bognor Regis and Littlehampton	Conservative	1997
Cheryl Gillan	Chesham and Amersham	Conservative	1992
Michael Gove	Surrey Heath	Conservative	2005
Helen Grant	Maidstone and The Weald	Conservative	2010
Chris Grayling	Epsom and Ewell	Conservative	2001
Damian Green	Ashford	Conservative	1997
Dominic Grieve	Beaconsfield	Independent (suspended from Conservatives)	1997
Sam Gyimah	East Surrey	Liberal Democrats (prev. Conservatives and independent)	2010
Philip Hammond	Runnymede and Weybridge	Independent (suspended from Conservatives)	1997
Gordon Henderson	Sittingbourne and Sheppey	Conservative	2010
Nick Herbert	Arundel and South Downs	Conservative	2005
Damian Hinds	East Hampshire	Conservative	2010
George Hollingbery	Meon Valley	Conservative	2010
Adam Holloway	Gravesham	Conservative	2005
John Howell	Henley	Conservative	2008 by-election
Jeremy Hunt	South West Surrey	Conservative	2005
Ranil Jayawardena	North East Hampshire	Conservative	2015
Gareth Johnson	Dartford	Conservative	2010
Gillian Keegan	Chichester	Conservative	2017
Kwasi Kwarteng	Spelthorne	Conservative	2010
Peter Kyle	Hove	Labour	2015
Mark Lancaster	Milton Keynes North	Conservative	2010
Phillip Lee	Bracknell	Liberal; Democrats (prev. Conservative) (Note: In September 2019, Lee resigned the Conservative whip and defected to the Liberal Democrats.)	2010
Julian Lewis	New Forest East	Conservative	1997
David Lidington	Aylesbury	Conservative	1992
Stephen Lloyd	Eastbourne	Liberal Democrats	2010 (Note: Lloyd was defeated in the 2015 election and re-entered the House in the 2017 election.)
Jonathan Lord	Woking	Conservative	2010
Tim Loughton	East Worthing and Shoreham	Conservative	1997
Caroline Lucas	Brighton Pavilion	Green	2010
Craig Mackinlay	South Thanet	Conservative	2015
Alan Mak	Havant	Conservative	2015
Kit Malthouse	North West Hampshire	Conservative	2015
Theresa May	Maidenhead	Conservative	1997
Huw Merriman	Bexhill and Battle	Conservative	2015
Maria Miller	Basingstoke	Conservative	2005
Anne Milton	Guildford	Independent (suspended from Conservatives)	2005
Stephen Morgan	Portsmouth South	Labour	2017
Layla Moran	Oxford West and Abingdon	Liberal Democrats	2017
Penny Mordaunt	Portsmouth North	Conservative	2010
Caroline Nokes	Romsey and Southampton North	Independent (suspended from Conservatives)	2010
Victoria Prentis	Banbury	Conservative	2015
Jeremy Quin	Horsham	Conservative	2015
Dominic Raab	Esher and Walton	Conservative	2010
John Redwood	Wokingham	Conservative	1987
Matt Rodda	Reading East	Labour	2017
Amber Rudd	Hastings and Rye	Independent (prev. Conservative) (Note: Rudd resigned the Conservative whip on 7 September 2019 and sat as an independent MP.)	2010
Lloyd Russell-Moyle	Brighton Kemptown	Labour Co-op	2017
Bob Seely	Isle of Wight	Conservative	2017
Alok Sharma	Reading West	Conservative	2010
Henry Smith	Crawley	Conservative	2010
Royston Smith	Southampton Itchen	Conservative	2015
Nicholas Soames	Mid Sussex	Independent (suspended from Conservatives)	1997
Iain Stewart	Milton Keynes South	Conservative	2010
Desmond Swayne	New Forest West	Conservative	1997
Kelly Tolhurst	Rochester and Strood	Conservative	2015
Tom Tugendhat	Tonbridge and Malling	Conservative	2015
Ed Vaizey	Wantage	Independent (suspended from Conservatives)	2005
Alan Whitehead	Southampton Test	Labour	1997
Helen Whately	Faversham and Mid Kent	Conservative	2015

== MPs in the South West region ==
Affiliation	Members
Conservative	45
Labour	7
Liberal Democrats	2
Independent	1
Total	55

MP	Constituency	Party	In constituency since
Ben Bradshaw	Exeter	Labour	1997
Robert Buckland	South Swindon	Conservative	2010
Conor Burns	Bournemouth West	Conservative	2010
Alex Chalk	Cheltenham	Conservative	2015
Christopher Chope	Christchurch	Conservative	1997
Geoffrey Clifton-Brown	The Cotswolds	Conservative	1997
Geoffrey Cox	Torridge and West Devon	Conservative	2005
Thangam Debbonaire	Bristol West	Labour	2015
Michelle Donelan	Chippenham	Conservative	2015
Steve Double	St Austell and Newquay	Conservative	2015
Richard Drax	South Dorset	Conservative	2010
David Drew	Stroud	Labour Co-op	2017
Tobias Ellwood	Bournemouth East	Conservative	2005
George Eustice	Camborne and Redruth	Conservative	2010
Kevin Foster	Torbay	Conservative	2015
Liam Fox	North Somerset	Conservative	2010
Marcus Fysh	Yeovil	Conservative	2015
John Glen	Salisbury	Conservative	2010
Richard Graham	Gloucester	Conservative	2010
James Gray	North Wiltshire	Conservative	1997
Luke Hall	Thornbury and Yate	Conservative	2015
Mark Harper	Forest of Dean	Conservative	2005
James Heappey	Wells	Conservative	2015
Peter Heaton-Jones	North Devon	Conservative	2015
Simon Hoare	North Dorset	Conservative	2015
Wera Hobhouse	Bath	Liberal Democrats	2017
Darren Jones	Bristol North West	Labour	2017
Oliver Letwin	West Dorset	Independent (suspended from Conservatives)	1997
Ian Liddell-Grainger	Bridgwater and West Somerset	Conservative	2001
Jack Lopresti	Filton and Bradley Stoke	Conservative	2010
Scott Mann	North Cornwall	Conservative	2015
Johnny Mercer	Plymouth Moor View	Conservative	2015
Anne Marie Morris	Newton Abbot	Conservative	2010
Kerry McCarthy	Bristol East	Labour	2005
Sheryll Murray	South East Cornwall	Conservative	2010
Andrew Murrison	South West Wiltshire	Conservative	2010
Sarah Newton	Truro and Falmouth	Conservative	2010
Neil Parish	Tiverton and Honiton	Conservative	2010
John Penrose	Weston-super-Mare	Conservative	2005
Claire Perry	Devizes	Conservative	2010
Luke Pollard	Plymouth Sutton and Devonport	Labour Co-op	2017
Rebecca Pow	Taunton Deane	Conservative	2015
Jacob Rees-Mogg	North East Somerset	Conservative	2010
Laurence Robertson	Tewkesbury	Conservative	1997
Chris Skidmore	Kingswood	Conservative	2010
Karin Smyth	Bristol South	Labour	2015
Gary Streeter	South West Devon	Conservative	1997
Mel Stride	Central Devon	Conservative	2010
Hugo Swire	East Devon	Conservative	2001
Robert Syms	Poole	Conservative	1997
Derek Thomas	St Ives	Conservative	2015
Justin Tomlinson	North Swindon	Conservative	2010
Michael Tomlinson	Mid Dorset and North Poole	Conservative	2015
David Warburton	Somerton and Frome	Conservative	2015
Sarah Wollaston	Totnes	Liberal Democrats (prev. Conservative and Change UK) (Note: Wollaston quit the Conservatives in February 2019 to join The Independent Group (later Change UK), before quitting in June 2019 and then joining the Liberal Democrats two months later.)	2010

== MPs in the West Midlands region ==
Affiliation	Members
Conservative	34
Labour	23
Independent	2
Total	59

MP	Constituency	Party	In constituency since
Lucy Allan	Telford	Conservative	2015
Ian Austin	Dudley North	Independent (prev. Labour) (Note: Austin resigned from Labour in February 2019 to sit as an independent MP.)	2005
Adrian Bailey	West Bromwich West	Labour Co-op	2000 by-election
Harriett Baldwin	West Worcestershire	Conservative	2010
Karen Bradley	Staffordshire Moorlands	Conservative	2010
Jack Brereton	Stoke-on-Trent South	Conservative	2017
Richard Burden	Birmingham Northfield	Labour	1992
Liam Byrne	Birmingham Hodge Hill	Labour	2004 by-election
Bill Cash	Stone	Conservative	1997
Jim Cunningham	Coventry South	Labour	1997
Jack Dromey	Birmingham Erdington	Labour	2010
Philip Dunne	Ludlow	Conservative	2005
Michael Fabricant	Lichfield	Conservative	1997
Paul Farrelly	Newcastle-under-Lyme	Labour	2001
Colleen Fletcher	Coventry North East	Labour	2015
Mark Garnier	Wyre Forest	Conservative	2010
Preet Gill	Birmingham Edgbaston	Labour Co-op	2017
Roger Godsiff	Birmingham Hall Green	Labour	2010
Andrew Griffiths	Burton	Conservative	2010
Nigel Huddleston	Mid Worcestershire	Conservative	2015
Eddie Hughes	Walsall North	Conservative	2017
Margot James	Stourbridge	Independent (suspended from Conservatives)	2010
Sajid Javid	Bromsgrove	Conservative	2010
Marcus Jones	Nuneaton	Conservative	2010
Daniel Kawczynski	Shrewsbury and Atcham	Conservative	2005
Julian Knight	Solihull	Conservative	2015
Jeremy Lefroy	Stafford	Conservative	2010
Rachel Maclean	Redditch	Conservative	2017
Khalid Mahmood	Birmingham Perry Barr	Labour	2001
Shabana Mahmood	Birmingham Ladywood	Labour	2010
Steve McCabe	Birmingham Selly Oak	Labour	2010
Pat McFadden	Wolverhampton South East	Labour	2005
Amanda Milling	Cannock Chase	Conservative	2015
Andrew Mitchell	Sutton Coldfield	Conservative	2001
James Morris	Halesowen and Rowley Regis	Conservative	2010
Wendy Morton	Aldridge-Brownhills	Conservative	2015
Jesse Norman	Hereford and South Herefordshire	Conservative	2010
Owen Paterson	North Shropshire	Conservative	1997
Mark Pawsey	Rugby	Conservative	2010
Jess Phillips	Birmingham Yardley	Labour	2015
Christopher Pincher	Tamworth	Conservative	2010
Mark Pritchard	The Wrekin	Conservative	2005
Emma Reynolds	Wolverhampton North East	Labour	2010
Geoffrey Robinson	Coventry North West	Labour	1976 by-election
Ruth Smeeth	Stoke-on-Trent North	Labour	2015
Eleanor Smith	Wolverhampton South West	Labour	2017
Gareth Snell	Stoke-on-Trent Central	Labour	2017 by-election
John Spellar	Warley	Labour	1997
Caroline Spelman	Meriden	Conservative	1997
Craig Tracey	North Warwickshire	Conservative	2015
Valerie Vaz	Walsall South	Labour	2010
Robin Walker	Worcester	Conservative	2010
Tom Watson	West Bromwich East	Labour	2001
Matt Western	Warwick and Leamington	Labour	2017
Bill Wiggin	North Herefordshire	Conservative	2010
Gavin Williamson	South Staffordshire	Conservative	2010
Mike Wood	Dudley South	Conservative	2015
Jeremy Wright	Kenilworth and Southam	Conservative	2010
Nadhim Zahawi	Stratford-on-Avon	Conservative	2010

== MPs in the Yorkshire and the Humber region ==
Affiliation	Members
Labour	35
Conservative	17
Liberal Democrats	1
Independent	1
Total	54

MP	Constituency	Party	In constituency since
Nigel Adams	Selby and Ainsty	Conservative	2010
Stuart Andrew	Pudsey	Conservative	2010
Kevin Barron	Rother Valley	Labour	1983
Hilary Benn	Leeds Central	Labour	1999 by-election
Clive Betts	Sheffield South East	Labour	2010
Paul Blomfield	Sheffield Central	Labour	2010
Tracy Brabin	Batley and Spen	Labour Co-op	2016 by-election
Richard Burgon	Leeds East	Labour	2015
Sarah Champion	Rotherham	Labour	2012 by-election
Yvette Cooper	Normanton, Pontefract and Castleford	Labour	2010
Mary Creagh	Wakefield	Labour	2005
Judith Cummins	Bradford South	Labour	2015
Nic Dakin	Scunthorpe	Labour	2010
Philip Davies	Shipley	Conservative	2005
David Davis	Haltemprice and Howden	Conservative	1997
Caroline Flint	Don Valley	Labour	1997
Gill Furniss	Sheffield Brightside and Hillsborough	Labour	2016 by-election
Robert Goodwill	Scarborough and Whitby	Conservative	2005
John Grogan	Keighley	Labour	2017
Louise Haigh	Sheffield Heeley	Labour	2015
Fabian Hamilton	Leeds North East	Labour	1997
Emma Hardy	Kingston upon Hull West and Hessle	Labour	2017
John Healey	Wentworth and Dearne	Labour	2010
Kevin Hollinrake	Thirsk and Malton	Conservative	2015
Imran Hussain	Bradford East	Labour	2015
Dan Jarvis	Barnsley Central	Labour	2011 by-election
Andrea Jenkyns	Morley and Outwood	Conservative	2015
Diana Johnson	Kingston upon Hull North	Labour	2005
Andrew Jones	Harrogate and Knaresborough	Conservative	2010
Greg Knight	East Yorkshire	Conservative	2001
Holly Lynch	Halifax	Labour	2015
Rachael Maskell	York Central	Labour	2015
Ed Miliband	Doncaster North	Labour	2005
Jared O'Mara	Sheffield Hallam	Independent (prev. Labour) (Note: O'Mara was suspended from Labour in October 2017 after offensive online comments he made over a decade earlier were revealed. Despite reports that he had been re-admitted, O'Mara remained as an independent until announcing his resignation as an MP.)	2017
Melanie Onn	Great Grimsby	Labour	2015
Stephanie Peacock	Barnsley East	Labour	2017
Andrew Percy	Brigg and Goole	Conservative	2010
Rachel Reeves	Leeds West	Labour	2010
Naz Shah	Bradford West	Labour	2015
Barry Sheerman	Huddersfield	Labour Co-op	1983
Alec Shelbrooke	Elmet and Rothwell	Conservative	2010
Paula Sherriff	Dewsbury	Labour	2015
Angela Smith	Penistone and Stocksbridge	Liberal Democrats (prev. Labour, Change UK and The Independents) (Note: Smith quit the Conservatives in February 2019 to join The Independent Group (later Change UK), before quitting to become an independent MP in June 2019. The following month, she founded The Independents with four other MPs, then joined the Liberal Democrats in September.)	2010
Julian Smith	Skipton and Ripon	Conservative	2010
Alex Sobel	Leeds North West	Labour Co-op	2017
Graham Stuart	Beverley and Holderness	Conservative	2005
Julian Sturdy	York Outer	Conservative	2010
Rishi Sunak	Richmond (Yorks)	Conservative	2015
Jon Trickett	Hemsworth	Labour	1996 by-election
Karl Turner	Kingston upon Hull East	Labour	2010
Martin Vickers	Cleethorpes	Conservative	2010
Thelma Walker	Colne Valley	Labour	2017
Craig Whittaker	Calder Valley	Conservative	2010
Rosie Winterton	Doncaster Central	Labour	1997

== By-elections ==
- 2018 Lewisham East by-election
- 2019 Peterborough by-election

== See also ==
- 2017 United Kingdom general election
- Category:UK MPs 2017–2019
- List of MPs elected in the 2017 United Kingdom general election
- List of MPs for constituencies in Northern Ireland (2017–2019)
- List of MPs for constituencies in Scotland (2017–2019)
- List of MPs for constituencies in Wales (2017–2019)
