= Renew Party =

British political party

- Founded: 19 February 2018
- Dissolved: 1 February 2022
- Merged into: True and Fair Party
- Headquarters: 151 Battersea Rise; London; SW11 1HP
- Ideology: Reformism; Pro-Europeanism
- Political position: Centre
- Colours: Blue Pink

The Renew Party was a minor centrist political party in the United Kingdom. It was set up in 2017 to provide an alternative for moderate voters in the wake of the 2016 United Kingdom European Union membership referendum. The party described itself as wanting to reform existing political structures and did not identify with either left-wing or right-wing ideologies. It welcomed candidates and members from non-political backgrounds.

One of the party's main positions was to advocate that the UK should be part of the European Union, although it also emphasised investment in education, sustainable development and environmental protection as key values. James Clarke had led the party since July 2020, with Carla Burns as deputy leader.

The party merged into the newly formed True and Fair Party on 1 February 2022.

== History ==
Renew was founded by Sandra Khadhouri, a former UN worker; Chris Coghlan, a former Foreign and Commonwealth Office anti-terror officer; James Clarke, a tech business development consultant; and James Torrance, an accountant and former Conservative. Coghlan, Clarke and Torrance ran as independents in Battersea, Bermondsey and Southwark and Kensington respectively in the 2017 general election.

Renew was registered with the Electoral Commission in autumn 2017, and the party officials were named as Torrance (leader), Clarke (nominating officer) and David Britten (treasurer). The party was launched on 19 February 2018 at a press conference in London. Following its launch, the party embarked on a "Listen to Britain" tour of the UK, visiting 22 towns and cities and liaising with locals and supporters, addressing schools, holding campaign events and conducting over 5,000 surveys.

On 2 March 2018, James Cousins, a former Conservative and latterly independent councillor of Wandsworth London Borough Council joined Renew, giving the party its first seat in local government. He subsequently lost his seat in the May 2018 local election. John Ferrett, a former Labour councillor in Portsmouth, joined Renew in 2018, but in 2019 was listed as a non-aligned independent.

In September 2018, Renew formed an electoral alliance with Advance Together, with Advance Together's Annabel Mullion joining the leadership team. While the party at first had three leaders – Mullion, Torrance and Clarke – Mullion was later described as leader, with the party's website describing Torrance and Clarke as deputy leaders. Mullion stepped down as leader on 7 June 2019 and was replaced by the independent MEP for the Southwest of England and Gibraltar, Julie Girling.

On 15 April 2019, the party announced that it was preparing to wind up its 2019 European election campaign in order to support Change UK.

On 31 October 2019, Renew announced 51 candidates in England, Scotland and Wales in advance of the general election scheduled for 12 December. On 13 November, it said that only four of these would stand, in Bromley and Chislehurst, Edinburgh North and Leith, Hackney North and Stoke Newington and Sefton Central, in order to improve the chances of remain-supporting candidates in the other 47 seats.

On 7 July 2020, Renew announced the results of its leadership election, with James Clarke elected as Leader and Carla Burns as Deputy Leader.

On 1 February 2022, the Renew Party announced that it had merged its operations into the new True and Fair Party, founded by Gina Miller a few weeks earlier.

== Finance ==
According to party accounts filed with the Electoral Commission, Renew had an income of £29,480 in 2017, all donations having come from Richard Breen. In the first four months of 2018, Breen donated another £118,916. A further £23,000 was donated by Roderick Thackray. Thackray has been a partner in Breen's business, Sutney LLP, since 2014.

After February 2018, Renew received over a thousand small donations from supporters. In March, the party crowdfunded £17,170 for its "Listen to Britain" tour and in summer 2018 launched its party membership scheme and raised funds through this channel.

== Ideology ==
Torrance described Renew as a moderate, centrist party which Clarke identified as "centre-right on the economy and centre-left socially".

According to the party's website, its core aim was to renew UK politics, address inequality and division in the country and reform the system. It advocated extensive local devolution and the introduction of proportional representation. The party also aimed to tackle homelessness via a crown corporation tasked with developing and delivering affordable housing and pledged to expand the national healthcare budget while improving efficiency and accountability in the NHS. The party's economic policy focused on fostering innovation and investment-driven growth within a regulated free-market system. The party also promoted environmental sustainability via the widespread use of renewables and developing investment in green technology.

The party was compared to Emmanuel Macron's En Marche! party in France and received support from the French MP Amélie de Montchalin, who was the whip of the majority in the French National Assembly at that time. The party campaigned throughout the UK and attended the People's Vote marches of October 2018 and March 2019, alongside other pro-European individuals and groups.

Following the 2019 general election, Renew announced its intention to refocus on reform, participation and openness. In 2021, the party announced a shift away from anti-Brexit politics. Renew's position on Europe was set out as regaining access to the single market and customs union.

== Electoral performance ==
In the 2018 local elections, the party stood 16 candidates in London and the North East. It won no seats, with James Cousins losing his seat in Wandsworth.

June Davies was the Renew candidate in the 2019 Newport West by-election, finishing in seventh place with 879 votes (3.7%).

The party's then leader, Annabel Mullion, stood as a candidate for London in the 2019 European election as part of a temporary electoral alliance with Change UK. Five other Renew candidates were selected to stand in Scotland, Wales, Yorkshire & Humber and London. The total number of national votes cast for the combined slate was 571,846.

On 2 May, the party returned John Bates as a local councillor for Morecambe, Torrisholme Ward.

For the 2019 Peterborough by-election, Renew worked with the Liberal Democrats, the Green Party and Change UK to support a "unity remain candidate", but the plan broke down at the last minute. In the event, Renew's candidate, Peter Ward, finished 13th out of 15 candidates. The party chose not to stand a candidate for the 2019 Brecon and Radnorshire by-election "to give a Remain candidate the best chance of winning".

In the 2019 general election, Renew stood down 47 of its 51 announced candidates as part of the Unite to Remain pact to promote a Remain Alliance. Renew stood four candidates in Edinburgh, Kent, Merseyside and North London.

Kam Balayev ran as the Renew candidate for London Mayor, coming in 18th place out of 20 candidates with 0.3% of the vote.

In 2021, Volt Europa's Scotland branch, Volt Scotland, formed an electoral pact with Renew Scotland which meant Volt Scotland standing its candidates alongside Renew's under the Renew party list for the 2021 Scottish Parliament election. For the Scottish Parliament elections, Renew backed a multiple-choice referendum on the issue of Scottish independence like its Volt Scotland counterparts. Renew candidates received 493 votes or 0.02% of the vote for their regional lists and failed to return any MSPs.

=== Summary ===
==== By-elections 2017–2019 ====
Date of election	Constituency	Candidate	Votes	%
4 April 2019	Newport West	June Davies	879	3.7
6 June 2019	Peterborough	Peter Ward	45	0.1

=== 2019 general election ===
Constituency	Candidate	Votes	%
Bromley and Chislehurst	Jyoti Dialani	119	0.3
Edinburgh North and Leith	Heather Astbury	138	0.2
Hackney North and Stoke Newington	Haseeb Ur-Rehman	151	0.3
Sefton Central	Carla Burns	137	0.3
