= List of MPs for constituencies in Northern Ireland (2017–2019) =

- 8 June 2017
- Colours on map indicate the party allegiance of each constituency's MP.

This is a list of members of Parliament (MPs) elected to the House of Commons of the United Kingdom by Northern Irish constituencies for the 57th Parliament of the United Kingdom (2017 to 2019). There are 18 such constituencies, 11 of which are represented by Unionists and seven by Nationalists. It includes both MPs elected at the 2017 general election, held on 8 June 2017, and those subsequently elected in by-elections.

The list is sorted by the name of the MP, and MPs who did not serve throughout the Parliament are italicised. New MPs elected since the general election are noted at the bottom of the page.

Sinn Féin MPs follow an abstentionist policy of not taking their seats in the House of Commons.

== Current composition ==
| Affiliation | Members |
|---|---|
| Democratic Unionist | 10 |
| Sinn Féin | 7 |
| Independent | 1 |
| Total | 18 |

Number of seats by party
1. Democratic Unionist (55.6%)
2. Sinn Féin (38.9%)
3. Independent (5.56%)

== MPs ==
| MP | Constituency | Party | In constituency since | Majority |
|---|---|---|---|---|
| Órfhlaith Begley | West Tyrone | Sinn Féin | 2018 by-election | 7,956 |
| Mickey Brady | Newry and Armagh | Sinn Féin | 2015 | 12,489 |
| Gregory Campbell | East Londonderry | Democratic Unionist | 2001 | 8,842 |
| Nigel Dodds | Belfast North | Democratic Unionist | 2001 | 2,081 |
| Sir Jeffrey Donaldson | Lagan Valley | Democratic Unionist | 1997 | 19,229 |
| Michelle Gildernew | Fermanagh and South Tyrone | Sinn Féin | 2001 | 875 |
| Paul Girvan | South Antrim | Democratic Unionist | 2017 | 3,208 |
| Chris Hazzard | South Down | Sinn Féin | 2017 | 2,446 |
| Sylvia, Lady Hermon | North Down | Independent | 2001 | 1,208 |
| Gavin Robinson | Belfast East | Democratic Unionist | 2015 | 8,474 |
| Paul Maskey | Belfast West | Sinn Féin | 2011 by-election | 21,652 |
| Elisha McCallion | Foyle | Sinn Féin | 2017 | 169 |
| Barry McElduff | West Tyrone | Sinn Féin | 2017 | 10,342 |
| Francie Molloy | Mid Ulster | Sinn Féin | 2013 by-election | 12,890 |
| Ian Paisley Jr | North Antrim | Democratic Unionist | 2010 | 20,643 |
| Emma Little-Pengelly | Belfast South | Democratic Unionist | 2017 | 1,996 |
| Jim Shannon | Strangford | Democratic Unionist | 2010 | 18,343 |
| David Simpson | Upper Bann | Democratic Unionist | 2005 | 7,992 |
| Sammy Wilson | East Antrim | Democratic Unionist | 2005 | 15,923 |

== See also ==
- 2017 United Kingdom general election
- List of MPs elected in the 2017 United Kingdom general election
- List of MPs for constituencies in England (2017–2019)
- List of MPs for constituencies in Scotland (2017–2019)
- List of MPs for constituencies in Wales (2017–2019)
- Category:UK MPs 2017–2019
