= Paul Flynn (British politician) =

British politician (1935–2019)

- Official portrait, 2005

Shadow Leader of the House of Commons
- In office 4 July 2016 – 6 October 2016
- Leader: Jeremy Corbyn
- Preceded by: Chris Bryant
- Succeeded by: Valerie Vaz

Shadow Secretary of State for Wales
- In office 3 July 2016 – 6 October 2016
- Leader: Jeremy Corbyn
- Preceded by: Nia Griffith
- Succeeded by: Jo Stevens

Member of Parliament for Newport West
- In office 11 June 1987 – 17 February 2019
- Preceded by: Mark Robinson
- Succeeded by: Ruth Jones

Personal details
- Born: Paul Philip Flynn; 9 February 1935 Cardiff, Wales
- Died: 17 February 2019 (aged 84) Newport, Wales
- Party: Labour
- Spouses: Anne Harvey (m. 1962; div. 1984) Samantha Morgan (m. 1985)
- Children: 4
- Education: St Illtyd's Catholic High School
- Alma mater: Cardiff University
- Website: Official website

Paul Philip Flynn (9 February 1935 – 17 February 2019) was a British Labour Party politician who served as Member of Parliament (MP) for Newport West from the 1987 general election until his death in 2019. He briefly served as Shadow Secretary of State for Wales and Shadow Leader of the House of Commons in 2016, becoming the oldest MP to hold a shadow cabinet position, aged 81.

== Early life ==
Flynn was born in Cardiff to an Irish father and Welsh mother in the Grangetown area of the city. His father was a postman who was wounded in the First World War and died when Flynn was five years old, leaving him and his four siblings to be raised in poverty by their mother; it was she who taught him Welsh. At the age of nine he was diagnosed with rheumatoid arthritis. He was educated at the local Catholic grammar school St Illtyd's College, and later attended University College, Cardiff.

On leaving education in 1955, he worked as a chemist in the steel industry, where he remained until he was made redundant in 1983. He initially worked near Cardiff Docks, where he suffered serious loss of hearing from working in a nail factory, before taking up employment at Llanwern steelworks. After a brief period as a broadcaster, in 1984 he became a researcher for Llew Smith, a Labour Member of the European Parliament.

== Political career ==
Flynn had joined the Labour Party in 1956. He was a member of Newport Borough Council from 1972 to 1981 and Gwent County Council from 1974 to 1982. He unsuccessfully contested Denbigh at the October 1974 general election where he came third behind the Conservative and Liberal candidates, Geraint Morgan and D. L. Williams respectively, with a 20.24% share of the vote. He was elected to the House of Commons for Newport West at the 1987 general election.

Flynn was appointed as junior spokesman for Wales by Labour leader Neil Kinnock shortly after his election to the Commons. He joined the front bench in 1988, when he became a spokesman on health and social security and for social security in 1989. He resigned from the front bench in 1990, and was on the back benches for 26 years after that, until his appointment to Jeremy Corbyn's shadow cabinet, which followed a string of resignations.

Flynn was a member of eight different Select committees, for twelve periods; three times each for the Public Administration Select Committee and Welsh Affairs Committee. He was a member of the Public Administration Select Committee for a period of over thirteen years between 2005 and his death. He joined the Transport Select Committee in 1992 and served thereon until the 1997 general election.

On 30 June 2016, Flynn stood in on the party's front bench as Shadow Leader of the House of Commons following Chris Bryant's resignation, prior to a permanent replacement being appointed. Believed to be the oldest person to speak from the front benches since William Gladstone in the 19th century, he joked that his appointment would improve the diversity of a Parliament whose front benches suffered from a "a total absence of octogenarians". On 3 July 2016, Corbyn appointed Flynn Shadow Secretary of State for Wales. On 6 October 2016, Flynn was replaced as Shadow Wales Secretary by Jo Stevens and as Shadow Leader of the House by Valerie Vaz. Flynn said "Our glorious leader, in an act of pioneering diversity, courageously decided to give opportunities for geriatrics on the front bench and this was so successful that he decided to create opportunities for geriatrics on the back bench. I'm double blessed."

=== Political views ===
Flynn was a republican and in 1996 tabled a bill to abolish the monarchy via a referendum. He also supported replacement of the House of Lords with an elected second chamber and opposed the British honours system.

Flynn opposed and campaigned against nuclear weapons. He was also a long-standing opponent of nuclear power in the United Kingdom, especially the new Hinkley Point C nuclear power station across the Bristol Channel from his constituency.

Flynn was a firm critic of the Iraq War and the War in Afghanistan. In 2009 he read out the 176 names of UK military personnel who had died in Iraq in a Commons speech.

In November 2017, Flynn said that President of the United States Donald Trump should be arrested for inciting racial hatred if he visited the UK.

Flynn was a "a titan in the UK drug law reform movement" according to the Transform Drug Policy Foundation, a think tank of which he was a patron. This involved asking numerous oral and written parliamentary questions at the request of Transform, tabling early day motions and private members bills, hosting events in Parliament on behalf of the charity, as well as doggedly raising the issue of drug law reform in the house in a series of memorable barnstorming speeches. His speeches included objecting to the classification of psilocybe mushrooms as illegal in the Drugs Act of 2005, in which he said: "We cannot make nature illegal. Magic mushrooms are part of the natural world. Some might describe them as a gift from God." Flynn called for the legalisation of cannabis for medical purposes and decriminalisation for general use. In August 2017 he said in the House of Commons: "I would call on people to break the law. To come here and use cannabis here and see what happens". In October 2017, Flynn sponsored a bill to legalise cannabis for medical purposes.

Flynn was critical of the Independent Parliamentary Standards Authority, arguing that the parliamentary expenses scheme should be replaced with a flat rate allowance dependent on the distance of each MP's constituency from Westminster. He claimed that the current procedure was too bureaucratic and time-consuming.

Following the poisoning of Sergei and Yulia Skripal in March 2018, Flynn tweeted that the Conservative Party were "officially sponsored by NERVE GAS KILLERS R US". He later deleted the post.

Flynn was a staunch pro-European, and described Brexit as "the biggest political disaster of (his) lifetime", despite Newport West voting to leave the EU by 54 to 46 percent. He served as a delegate to the Council of Europe and the Western European Union. He called for Prime Minister Theresa May to promise a second referendum on membership of the European Union. He stated "second thoughts are always superior to first thoughts". May responded to his call by saying it was "out of the question".

=== Endowment Justice ===
Endowment Justice, a company working on a contingency fee basis for borrowers, held talks with Flynn over its concerns about bad practices at several complaints-handling firms. In 2005 Flynn named them, however, in accusations about the whole sector. Flynn agreed to pay the company's legal costs of £35,450, plus £1,000 in damages, which the company said it would donate to the NSPCC. He also agreed to publish an apology on his website.

=== War in Afghanistan ===
Flynn was a harsh critic of the War in Afghanistan, and particularly the decision of the Labour government to expand involvement with the Helmand province campaign in 2006. Flynn read out the names of UK military personnel who had died in his commons speeches, and subsequently tabled motions naming all the military casualties so they were listed in Commons papers. After Britain withdrew from Afghanistan, Flynn stated the war, in which 456 British military lost their lives, could be the "worst military blunder in our history since the charge of the Light Brigade", and called for a public inquiry.

On 18 September 2012, Flynn was suspended from the sittings of the House of Commons for five days and docked a month's wages, after he accused Defence Secretary Philip Hammond of lying to Parliament by saying that military operations in Afghanistan were not reduced following attacks on NATO troops operating as trainers, and subsequently refused to withdraw the allegation when instructed to do so by Speaker John Bercow.

=== Ambassador to Israel ===
In November 2011, Flynn expressed concern that Matthew Gould, the UK's ambassador to Israel, had "proclaimed himself to be a Zionist". Martin Bright, writing in The Jewish Chronicle, reported that when challenged, Flynn said that Gould was vulnerable to accusations "of having Jewish loyalty" and that the position should be given to "someone with roots in the UK". Flynn said, "there hasn't been a Jewish ambassador to Israel and I think that is a good decision – to avoid the accusation that they have gone native." These comments drew criticism from Middle East Minister Alistair Burt, who stated that "Paul Flynn should take some time to consider his comments, which could easily be misconstrued. There is absolutely no reason why our ambassador to Israel should not be Jewish. Any allegations about Matthew Gould's conduct are utterly unsubstantiated. He is a first-class ambassador."

Douglas Alexander, the Shadow Foreign Secretary, also criticised Flynn, stating that "The faith of any British diplomat is irrelevant to their capability to their job. To make suggestions otherwise is wrong and offensive." Labour MP John Mann, chair of the All-Party Parliamentary Group Against Antisemitism, stated that Flynn should start preparing for his "retirement" and that "I suggest he starts his retirement with a workers' education course on understanding racism." Flynn later apologised for his comments, saying "There is no reason that anyone of any race or religion should be debarred from public office."

=== Intended retirement ===
In October 2018, Flynn announced that he would stand down as an MP before the 2019 general election due to his rheumatoid arthritis. He revealed that he was bed-bound and would step down "as soon as possible" but that he was "keen to carry on to represent the city as long as I can. The cost of a by-election is enormous. I want to avoid that if I can." He said that he would "go to the Commons on a stretcher if I have to" to take part in any Brexit deal vote in parliament. However, he was the only MP (apart from the Speaker, Deputy Speakers, tellers and abstentionist Sinn Féin members) who did not vote in the House of Commons "meaningful vote" on the Brexit withdrawal Agreement on 15 January 2019. He did not formally step down before his death the following month.

== Other activities ==
Flynn learned Welsh while a pupil at St Illtyd's College and said he fell in love with the language at that time. As a fluent speaker he commented about issues on Welsh-language TV and radio. He was a member of the Gorsedd of Bards. In 1996, he won The Spectator's Backbencher of the Year award, and in 1997 wrote a book, Commons Knowledge: How to Be a Backbencher.

Flynn was one of the first MPs to use the Internet to communicate with constituents, and in 2000 won the New Statesman New Media Award for his website, which was voted the best MP's website on many other occasions. He was an early adopter of Hansard CD-ROMs, and wrote a book, Dragons Led by Poodles, about the devolution campaign in Wales in the 1990s, in which he criticised some of his fellow MPs severely.

Flynn was chairman of the Broadcasting Council for Wales, and member of the South Wales Docks Board and the Council of University College, Cardiff.

Flynn said that the best description of him was one by the late political sketch-writer Simon Hoggart, who had said he was "the thinking man's Dennis Skinner"; Flynn thought this could be his epitaph.

== Personal life ==
He was married twice, first to Anne Harvey in 1962, with whom he had two children, a son and a daughter; their daughter died by suicide in 1979, aged 16. The couple divorced in 1984 and the following year he married Samantha Morgan Cumpstone, with whom he had two children.

In 2007 Flynn suffered a transient ischaemic attack.

== Death ==
Flynn died in Newport, Wales, on 17 February 2019, eight days after his 84th birthday, after a long illness. Labour leader Jeremy Corbyn described him as "an independent thinker who was a credit to the party" and Wales' First Minister Mark Drakeford called him a "giant of the Welsh Labour movement". Speaking at Prime Minister's Questions on 20 February, Theresa May said of Flynn, "He was an outstanding Parliamentarian, a tireless campaigner and championed his constituency of Newport West and Wales with energy and enthusiasm for over 30 years." Fellow Labour MP Jo Stevens described Flynn as a "kind, principled, fascinating man". Constituency neighbour Jessica Morden stated in a blog post, "In his 31 years as Newport West's MP he never let up campaigning against injustice, holding those in authority to account and championing his beloved City. He did this in his own inimitable style with wit, humour and as a passionate Newportonian."

== Publications ==
- Television in Wales by Paul Flynn, 1974
- Commons Knowledge: How to Be a Backbencher by Paul Flynn, 1997, Seren Books ISBN 1-85411-206-6
- Baglu 'Mlaen (Cyfres Y Cewri) by Paul Flynn, 1998, Cyhoeddiadau Mei ISBN 0-86074-147-8
- Dragons Led by Poodles: Inside Story of a New Labour Stitch Up by Paul Flynn, 1999, Politico's Publishing ISBN 1-902301-24-2
- The Unusual Suspect by Paul Flynn, 2010, Biteback Publishing ISBN 978-1-84954-017-9
- How to Be an MP by Paul Flynn, 2012, Biteback Publishing ISBN 978-1-84954-220-3
- Clockwinder Who Wouldn't Say No: The Life of David Taylor MP, 2012, ISBN 978-1-84954-221-0

Parliament of the United Kingdom
Preceded by Mark Robinson	Member of Parliament for Newport West; 1987–2019	Succeeded by Ruth Jones
Political offices
Preceded by Nia Griffith	Shadow Secretary of State for Wales; 2016	Succeeded by Jo Stevens
Preceded by Chris Bryant	Shadow Leader of the House of Commons; 2016	Succeeded by Valerie Vaz
