= Mark Robinson (English politician) =

English politician (born 1946)

Member of Parliament for Somerton and Frome
- In office 9 April 1992 – 8 April 1997
- Preceded by: Robert Boscawen
- Succeeded by: David Heath

Member of Parliament for Newport West
- In office 9 June 1983 – 18 May 1987
- Preceded by: New constituency
- Succeeded by: Paul Flynn

Parliamentary Under-Secretary of State for Wales
- In office 2 September 1985 – 12 June 1987
- Prime Minister: Margaret Thatcher
- Sec. of State: Nicholas Edwards

Personal details
- Born: 26 December 1946 (age 79)
- Party: Conservative Party UK

Mark Noel Foster Robinson (born 26 December 1946) is a retired Conservative Party politician in the United Kingdom.

== Early life and family ==
Born in Bristol to John Foster Robinson, CBE, TD, and Margaret, née Paterson, Robinson's father was High Sheriff of Avon in 1975. John Robinson's family ran ES&A Robinson, the paper and packaging conglomerate that later became Dickinson Robinson Group. Apart from paper, the Robinsons were famous for cricket. Robinson's grandfather, Sir Foster Robinson, was captain of Gloucestershire; other members of the family played for, and captained, Gloucestershire. Robinson was educated at Harrow and Christ Church, Oxford, where he read Modern History.

== UN and Commonwealth ==
Robinson spent six years at the United Nations: at the UN Relief Operation to Bangladesh; in the Office of the Under-Secretary General; and in the Office of the Secretary General, Kurt Waldheim. From 1977 to 1983 he was assistant director in the Office of the Commonwealth Secretary-General, who was then Sir Shridath Ramphal.

He is currently: Chairman of the Commonwealth Organisations' Committee on Zimbabwe; the UK Chairman of the Commonwealth Consortium for Education; a Council Member of the Winston Churchill Memorial Trust; Hon. Treasurer of the Commonwealth Round Table: the Commonwealth Journal of International Affairs; and a Trustee of Concordia UK.

== Member of Parliament ==
Robinson was elected Conservative Member of Parliament for the notionally safe Labour seat of Newport West in 1983. Owing to his background at the UN and the Commonwealth he was appointed to the Foreign Affairs Select Committee, a position he held until in 1985 when he was appointed Parliamentary Under-Secretary of State, Welsh Office, by Margaret Thatcher. Despite achieving an increase in his share of the vote, he lost his seat at the 1987 general election to Paul Flynn. He was re-elected in 1992 for the Somerset seat of Somerton and Frome. He was Parliamentary Private Secretary to the Minister for Overseas Development, Baroness Chalker, and the Foreign and Commonwealth Secretary, Douglas Hurd, but was defeated at the 1997 general election by David Heath. He has since served as a Commonwealth election observer.

From 1987 to 1995 he was a director of Leopold Joseph, a merchant bank, and from 1988 to 1992 he was a member of the board of the Commonwealth Development Corporation.

Parliament of the United Kingdom
New constituency	Member of Parliament for Newport West; 1983–1987	Succeeded by Paul Flynn
Preceded by Robert Boscawen	Member of Parliament for Somerton and Frome; 1992–1997	Succeeded by David Heath
