= Newport West (UK Parliament constituency) =

UK Parliament constituency (1983–2024)

Coordinates: 51.583°N 3.043°W

- Former county constituency for the House of Commons
- Boundary of Newport West in Wales
- Electorate: 63,056 (December 2010)

1983–2024
- Seats: One
- Created from: Newport and Monmouth
- Replaced by: Newport East; Newport West and Islwyn
- Senedd: Newport West, South Wales East

Newport West (Welsh: Gorllewin Casnewydd) was one of two parliamentary constituencies for the city of Newport, South Wales, in the House of Commons of the Parliament of the United Kingdom. It elected one Member of Parliament (MP) using the first-past-the-post voting system. Paul Flynn, of the Labour Party, was the MP from the 1987 general election until his death on 17 February 2019. Consequently, a by-election was held in the constituency on Thursday 4 April 2019 and Ruth Jones of the Labour Party was elected.

The constituency was abolished as part of the 2023 Periodic Review of Westminster constituencies and under the June 2023 final recommendations of the Boundary Commission for Wales for the 2024 United Kingdom general election. Its wards were split between the existing Newport East constituency and a new constituency named Newport West and Islwyn.

== Boundaries ==
Map of boundaries 1983–2024

The constituency comprised the electoral divisions of Allt-yr-yn, Bettws, Caerleon, Gaer, Graig, Malpas, Marshfield, Pillgwenlly, Rogerstone, Shaftesbury, Stow Hill and Tredegar Park in the city of Newport. The western and northern boundaries were formed by the city boundary, the eastern boundary by the River Usk, and the southern boundary by the Bristol Channel.

== History ==
Newport West was created when the former Newport constituency was split into two seats in 1983. The seat was won on a narrow three-figure majority by the Conservatives. However, Paul Flynn gained the seat for the Labour Party in 1987 and held it until his death in 2019.

== Members of Parliament ==
Election	Member	Party
1983	Mark Robinson	Conservative
1987	Paul Flynn	Labour
2019 by-election	Ruth Jones	Labour
2024	Constituency abolished	

== Elections ==
=== Elections in the 1980s ===
General election 1983: Newport West
Party	Candidate	Votes	%	±%
Conservative	Mark Robinson	15,948	38.0	N/A
Labour	Bryan Davies	15,367	36.6	N/A
Liberal	Whitney Jones	10,163	24.2	N/A
Plaid Cymru	Denis Watkins	477	1.2	N/A
Majority		581	1.4	N/A
Turnout		41,955	77.5	N/A
Registered electors		54,125		
Conservative win (new seat)				

General election 1987: Newport West
Party	Candidate	Votes	%	±%
Labour	Paul Flynn	20,887	46.1	+9.5
Conservative	Mark Robinson	18,179	40.1	+2.1
Liberal	Winston Roddick	5,903	13.0	−11.2
Plaid Cymru	Digby Bevan	377	0.8	−0.4
Majority		2,708	6.0	N/A
Turnout		45,346	81.8	+4.3
Registered electors		55,455		
Labour gain from Conservative		Swing	+3.7	

=== Elections in the 1990s ===
General election 1992: Newport West
Party	Candidate	Votes	%	±%
Labour	Paul Flynn	24,139	53.1	+7.0
Conservative	Andrew Taylor	16,360	36.0	−4.1
Liberal Democrats	John Toye	4,296	9.5	−3.5
Plaid Cymru (Green)	Peter Keelan	653	1.4	+0.6
Majority		7,770	17.1	+11.1
Turnout		45,059	82.8	+1.0
Registered electors		54,871		
Labour hold		Swing	+5.6	

General election 1997: Newport West
Party	Candidate	Votes	%	±%
Labour	Paul Flynn	24,331	60.5	+7.4
Conservative	Peter Clarke	9,794	24.4	−11.6
Liberal Democrats	Stanley Wilson	3,907	9.7	+0.2
Referendum	Andrew Thompsett	1,199	3.0	N/A
Plaid Cymru	Huw Jackson	648	1.6	+0.2
UKIP	Hugh Hughes	323	0.8	N/A
Majority		14,357	36.1	+19.0
Turnout		40,202	74.6	−8.2
Registered electors		53,914		
Labour hold		Swing	+9.5	

=== Elections in the 2000s ===
General election 2001: Newport West
Party	Candidate	Votes	%	±%
Labour	Paul Flynn	18,489	52.7	−7.8
Conservative	William Morgan	9,185	26.2	+1.8
Liberal Democrats	Veronica Watkins	4,095	11.7	+2.0
Plaid Cymru	Anthony Salkeld	2,510	7.2	+5.6
UKIP	Hugh Hughes	506	1.4	+0.6
BNP	Terrance Cavill	278	0.8	N/A
Majority		9,304	26.5	−9.6
Turnout		35,063	59.1	−15.5
Registered electors		59,345		
Labour hold		Swing	-4.8	

General election 2005: Newport West
Party	Candidate	Votes	%	±%
Labour	Paul Flynn	16,021	44.8	−7.9
Conservative	William Morgan	10,563	29.6	+3.4
Liberal Democrats	Nigel Flanagan	6,398	17.9	+6.2
Plaid Cymru	Anthony Salkeld	1,278	3.6	−3.6
UKIP	Hugh Hughes	848	2.4	+1.0
Green	Peter Varley	540	1.5	N/A
Independent	Saeid Arjomand	84	0.2	N/A
Majority		5,458	15.2	−11.3
Turnout		35,732	59.3	+0.2
Registered electors		60,303		
Labour hold		Swing	-5.6	

=== Elections in the 2010s ===
General election 2010: Newport West
Party	Candidate	Votes	%	±%
Labour	Paul Flynn	16,389	41.3	−3.5
Conservative	Matthew Williams	12,845	32.3	+2.7
Liberal Democrats	Veronica German	6,587	16.6	−1.3
BNP	Timothy Windsor	1,183	3.0	N/A
UKIP	Hugh Hughes	1,144	2.9	+0.5
Plaid Cymru	Jeff Rees	1,122	2.8	−0.8
Green	Pippa Bartolotti	450	1.1	−0.4
Majority		3,544	9.0	−6.2
Turnout		39,720	64.8	+5.5
Registered electors		62,111		
Labour hold		Swing	-3.2	

General election 2015: Newport West
Party	Candidate	Votes	%	±%
Labour	Paul Flynn	16,633	41.2	−0.1
Conservative	Nick Webb	13,123	32.5	+0.2
UKIP	Gordon Norrie	6,134	15.2	+12.3
Plaid Cymru	Simon Coopey	1,604	4.0	+1.2
Liberal Democrats	Ed Townsend	1,581	3.9	−12.7
Green	Pippa Bartolotti	1,272	3.2	+2.1
Majority		3,510	8.7	−0.3
Turnout		40,347	64.9	+0.1
Registered electors		62,137		
Labour hold		Swing	−0.1	

General election 2017: Newport West
Party	Candidate	Votes	%	±%
Labour	Paul Flynn	22,723	52.3	+11.1
Conservative	Angela Jones-Evans	17,065	39.3	+6.8
UKIP	Stan Edwards	1,100	2.5	−12.7
Plaid Cymru	Morgan Bowler-Brown	1,077	2.5	−1.5
Liberal Democrats	Sarah Lockyer	976	2.2	−1.7
Green	Pippa Bartolotti	497	1.1	−2.1
Rejected ballots		82		
Majority		5,658	13.0	+4.3
Turnout		43,438	67.5	+2.6
Registered electors		64,399		
Labour hold		Swing	+2.2	

Of the 82 rejected ballots:

- 47 were either unmarked or it was uncertain who the vote was for.
- 29 voted for more than one candidate.
- 4 had writing or mark by which the voter could be identified.

2019 Newport West by-election
Party	Candidate	Votes	%	±%
Labour	Ruth Jones	9,308	39.6	−12.7
Conservative	Matthew Evans	7,357	31.3	−8.0
UKIP	Neil Hamilton	2,023	8.6	+6.1
Plaid Cymru	Jonathan Clark	1,185	5.0	+2.5
Liberal Democrats	Ryan Jones	1,088	4.6	+2.4
Green	Amelia Womack	924	3.9	+2.8
Renew	June Davies	879	3.7	N/A
Abolish	Richard Suchorzewski	205	0.9	N/A
SDP	Ian McLean	202	0.9	N/A
Democrats and Veterans	Philip Taylor	185	0.8	N/A
For Britain	Hugh Nicklin	159	0.7	N/A
Rejected ballots		100		
Majority		1,951	8.2	−4.8
Turnout		23,615	37.1	−30.4
Registered electors		63,623		
Labour hold		Swing	−2.4	

Of the 100 rejected ballots:

- 69 were either unmarked or it was uncertain who the vote was for.
- 23 voted for more than one candidate.
- 8 had writing or mark by which the voter could be identified.

General election 2019: Newport West
Party	Candidate	Votes	%	±%
Labour	Ruth Jones	18,977	43.7	−8.6
Conservative	Matthew Evans	18,075	41.6	+2.3
Liberal Democrats	Ryan Jones	2,565	5.9	+3.7
Brexit Party	Cameron Edwards	1,727	4.0	N/A
Plaid Cymru	Jonathan Clark	1,187	2.7	+0.2
Green	Amelia Womack	902	2.1	+1.0
Rejected ballots		130		
Majority		902	2.1	−10.9
Turnout		43,433	65.2	−2.3
Registered electors		66,657		
Labour hold		Swing	−5.5	

Of the 130 rejected ballots:

- 98 were either unmarked or it was uncertain who the vote was for.
- 29 voted for more than one candidate.
- 3 had writing or mark by which the voter could be identified.

== See also ==
- Newport West (Senedd constituency)
- List of parliamentary constituencies in Gwent
- List of parliamentary constituencies in Wales
