= 2019 Newport West by-election =

2019 UK parliamentary by-election

- 4 April 2019

Newport West constituency
- Turnout: 37.1%
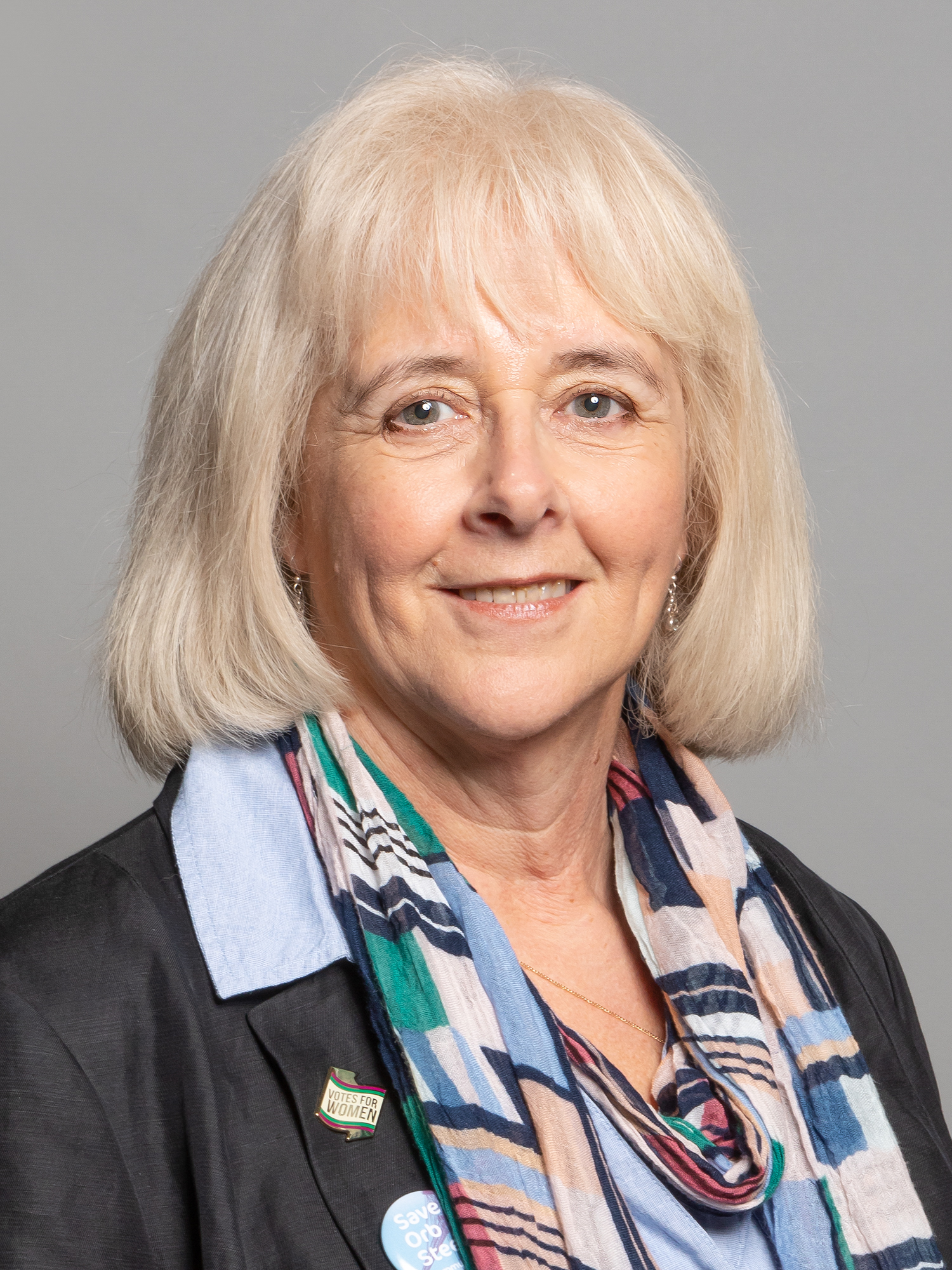

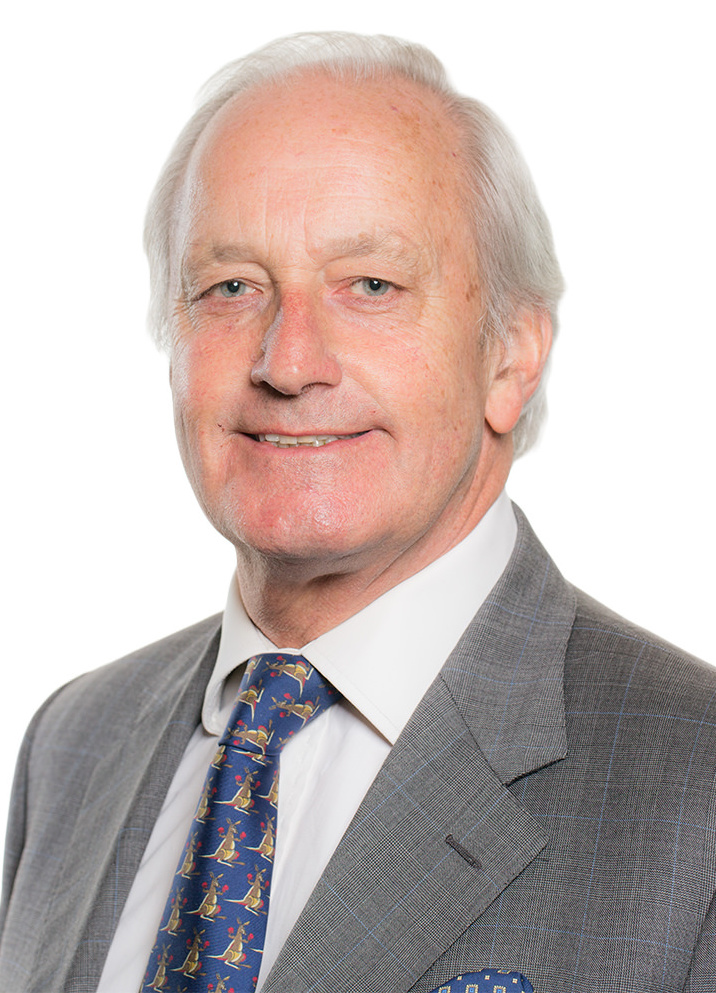
	First party	Second party
		Con
Candidate	Ruth Jones	Matthew Evans
Party	Labour	Conservative
Popular vote	9,308	7,357
Percentage	39.6%	31.3%
Swing	▼12.7 pp	▼8.0 pp
	Third party	Fourth party
		PC
Candidate	Neil Hamilton	Jonathan Clark
Party	UKIP	Plaid Cymru
Popular vote	2,023	1,185
Percentage	8.6%	5.0%
Swing	▲6.1 pp	▲2.5 pp
MP before election
Paul Flynn
Labour
Elected MP
Ruth Jones
Labour

A by-election for the United Kingdom parliamentary constituency of Newport West was held on 4 April 2019, following the death of incumbent Labour Party MP Paul Flynn. Labour candidate Ruth Jones held the seat for the party, albeit with a reduced majority.

== Background ==
In October 2018, the sitting MP Paul Flynn indicated his intention to resign his seat in the imminent future following a worsening of his rheumatoid arthritis. At the time, Flynn indicated that he would wait for a snap general election in case that allowed him to stand down without triggering a by-election, citing the expense involved in organising and holding one. He died on 17 February 2019 following a "long illness".

Newport West was held by Labour since 1987, when Flynn won the seat from the Conservatives. The constituency was semi-marginal, with Labour majorities not exceeding 10,000 votes except during the electoral landslide of 1997.

The writ of election was moved in Parliament on 28 February, scheduling the by-election for 4 April 2019.

== Candidates and timetable ==
Flynn had indicated his intention to stand down at or before the next general election and political parties had begun to select candidates in Newport West for the next general election, including Jonathan Clark (Plaid Cymru), Matthew Evans (Welsh Conservatives), Ruth Jones (Welsh Labour) and Amelia Womack (Green Party). UKIP selected its Welsh leader Neil Hamilton. The Liberal Democrats selected Ryan Jones. Also standing were Richard Suchorzewski for the Abolish the Welsh Assembly Party; June Davies for the Renew Party; Ian McLean for the continuing SDP; and candidates for For Britain and the Democrats and Veterans.

The new Brexit Party said it would not be standing. The recently formed Independent Group also declined to field its own candidate.

The election was administered by Newport City Council, with the statement of persons nominated published on 8 March 2019.

== Campaign ==
Welsh First Minister Mark Drakeford announced on 12 March that the expected decision on the construction of an M4 relief road around Newport would be delayed due to the purdah rules that had taken effect during the by-election. Such rules prevented the government from making major policy announcements to avoid unduly influencing an election campaign. The news was strongly criticised by the Conservative candidate.

The national backdrop for the by-election was the continued uncertainty over Brexit during the Brexit negotiations in 2019, with the original planned date for leaving the European Union being postponed and the failure of the House of Commons to agree a way forward. The Conservatives were concerned this would adversely affect their vote.

== Result ==
Bar chart of the election result.

2019 Newport West by-election
Party	Candidate	Votes	%	±%
Labour	Ruth Jones	9,308	39.6	−12.7
Conservative	Matthew Evans	7,357	31.3	−8.0
UKIP	Neil Hamilton	2,023	8.6	+6.1
Plaid Cymru	Jonathan Clark	1,185	5.0	+2.5
Liberal Democrats	Ryan Jones	1,088	4.6	+2.4
Green	Amelia Womack	924	3.9	+2.8
Renew	June Davies	879	3.7	N/A
Abolish	Richard Suchorzewski	205	0.9	N/A
SDP	Ian McLean	202	0.9	N/A
Democrats and Veterans	Philip Taylor	185	0.8	N/A
For Britain	Hugh Nicklin	159	0.7	N/A
Majority		1,951	8.3	−4.7
Turnout		23,515	37.1	−30.4
Registered electors		63,623		
Labour hold		Swing	−2.4	

== Previous result ==
Paul Flynn was re-elected to an eighth term of office in the 2017 general election, with an increased majority of 5,658 (13.0%) over the Conservative candidate.

General election 2017: Newport West
Party	Candidate	Votes	%	±%
Labour	Paul Flynn	22,723	52.3	+11.1
Conservative	Angela Jones-Evans	17,065	39.3	+6.8
UKIP	Stan Edwards	1,100	2.5	−12.7
Plaid Cymru	Morgan Bowler-Brown	1,077	2.5	−1.5
Liberal Democrats	Sarah Lockyer	976	2.2	−1.7
Green	Pippa Bartolotti	497	1.1	−2.0
Majority		5,658	13.0	+4.3
Turnout		43,438	67.5	+2.6
Registered electors		64,399		
Labour hold		Swing	+2.2	
