= Ruth Jones (politician) =

British physiotherapist and Labour politician

Ruth Jones MP
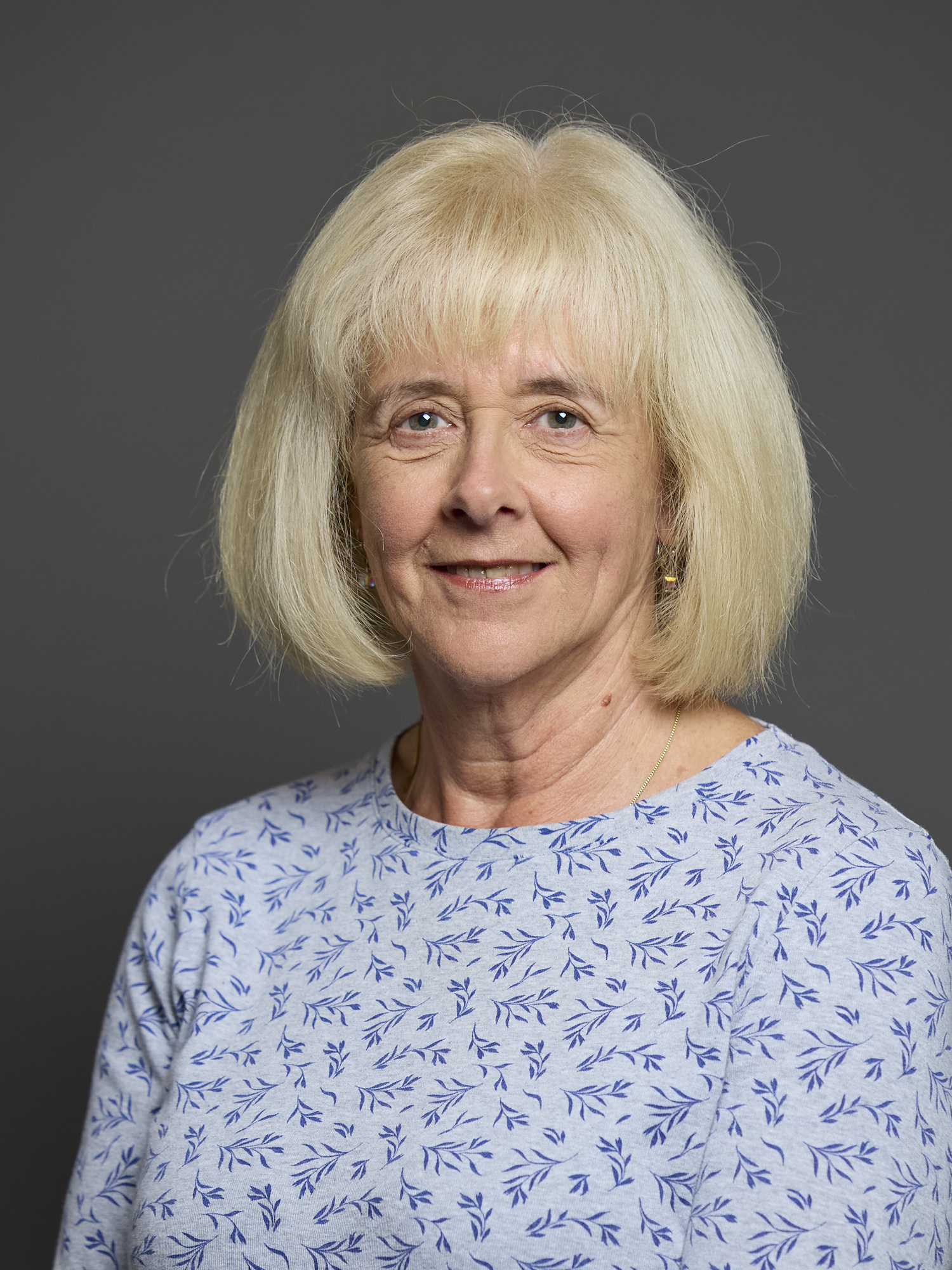
- Official portrait, 2024

Chair of the Welsh Affairs Select Committee
- Incumbent
- Assumed office 9 September 2024
- Preceded by: Stephen Crabb

Shadow Minister for the Environment
- In office 12 August 2020 – 5 July 2024
- Leader: Keir Starmer
- Preceded by: Lloyd Russell-Moyle
- Succeeded by: Robbie Moore

Shadow Minister for Flooding & Coastal Communities
- In office 15 January 2020 – 9 April 2020
- Leader: Jeremy Corbyn
- Preceded by: Luke Pollard
- Succeeded by: Stephanie Peacock

Member of Parliament for Newport West and Islwyn Newport West (2019–2024)
- Incumbent
- Assumed office 4 April 2019
- Preceded by: Paul Flynn
- Majority: 8,868 (21.1%)

Personal details
- Born: 23 April 1962 (age 64) Gaer, Newport, Wales
- Party: Labour
- Education: Cardiff University
- Profession: Physiotherapist; Politician
- Website: Official website

Ruth Lorraine Jones (born 23 April 1962) is a British Labour Party politician who has served as the Member of Parliament (MP) for Newport West and Islwyn since 2024. Before the 2024 constituency boundary change, she had been the MP for Newport West since winning the seat at a by-election in April 2019.

== Background ==
Jones was educated at Duffryn High School in Newport. After training at Cardiff University, she worked as a physiotherapist in the National Health Service from 1983, eventually managing children and adult learning disability services for the Aneurin Bevan University Health Board.

== Political career ==
Jones became involved with the professional body and trade union Chartered Society of Physiotherapy (CSP) as a steward, a regional steward, then a member of the CSP Council. In 2007 she was elected president of the Wales TUC for two years. In 2016 she became a full-time senior negotiating officer for the CSP.

Jones joined Labour "when Tony Blair was leader", has "declared herself a socialist", but regarding Jeremy Corbyn acknowledges that there are "strong views for him and strong views against him." She describes herself however as neither a member of the Blairite Progressive Britain nor the Corbynite Momentum group.

She contested Monmouth for Labour at the 2015 and 2017 general elections.

Jones was placed first on the party list in South East Wales at the 2016 National Assembly election. As Labour won 7 out of the 8 single member constituencies, Labour was not entitled to any extra seats from the Additional Member list, and Jones was not elected.

Jones voted to Remain in the 2016 referendum. She argued following the referendum for the Prime Minister to seek a cross-party "consensus" on leaving the European Union, but said she was opposed to a "damaging Tory Brexit or a no deal outcome". She said that if "Parliament [is unable] to achieve a sensible Brexit", she would support a People's Vote.

Jones was nominated as Labour's Parliamentary candidate for a third time, on this occasion for Newport West in January 2019 and was elected as an MP in April 2019 in the Newport West by-election, which had been caused by the death of the sitting Labour MP, Paul Flynn. On a relatively low turnout of 37.1%, Jones took 39.6% (9,308) of the vote, although the Labour majority dropped from 5,658 (in 2017) to 1,951. She was officially sworn in and took her seat in the House of Commons on 8 April 2019, and made her maiden speech on 1 May 2019 in a debate on climate change. Her constituency office at The Estates Office on Gold Tops was opened in June.

Jones stated in 2019 that she supported the now-cancelled M4 relief road to relieve traffic congestion on the M4 motorway.

Jones became a member of the Environmental Audit Select Committee in May 2019. She has signed the Long Live the Local pledge to reduce beer duty and business rates.

In August 2019 Jones joined 100 other MPs in calling for Prime Minister Boris Johnson to recall Parliament from the Summer Recess, and was one of 148 Labour MPs who wrote to the Prime Minister demanding he reverse the decision to prorogue Parliament in October for a Queen's Speech prior to the 31 October Brexit date. She voted in favour of the Benn Act, aimed at requiring an extension to Article 50 at the end of October to prevent a no deal exit on 31 October.

Jones was re-elected in the 2019 United Kingdom general election on a slim majority of 2.1%. She was appointed to Labour's shadow Defra team, first as Shadow Minister for Flooding and Coastal Communities under Corbyn, and later as Shadow Minister for Natural Environment and Air Quality under Keir Starmer. She had been serving as PPS to Shadow Northern Ireland Secretary Louise Haigh at the time of her promotion.

On 9 September 2024, she was elected unopposed as Chair of the Welsh Affairs Select Committee.

On 11 May 2026, Jones called on Keir Starmer to resign following the results of the 2026 Senedd election.

=== LGBT rights ===
In January 2022, Jones and four other Labour delegates to the Parliamentary Assembly of the Council of Europe tabled ten amendments to Resolution 2417, "Combating rising hate against LGBTI people in Europe". The amendments sought to include the word "sex" alongside gender identity, de-conflate the situation in the UK from Hungary, Poland, Russia and Turkey, and remove references to alleged anti-LGBTI movements in the UK. The delegates received both praise and criticism.

== Personal life ==
Jones is married with two adult children, both of whom studied at Glasllwch Primary School where she is a School Governor. She lives in Allt-yr-yn with her husband. She volunteers at a local night shelter scheme as well as being a member of a choir.

Trade union offices
| Preceded by John Burgham | President of the Wales TUC; 2007–2008 | Succeeded by Vaughan Gething |
Parliament of the United Kingdom
| Preceded by Paul Flynn | Member of Parliament for Newport West; 2019–present | Incumbent |
