= List of MPs for constituencies in Scotland (2017–2019) =

- Colours on map indicate the party allegiance of each constituency's MP.

This is a list of the 59 members of Parliament (MPs) elected to the House of Commons of the United Kingdom by Scottish constituencies for the Fifty-Seventh Parliament of the United Kingdom (2017 to 2019) at the 2017 United Kingdom general election.

== Composition ==
Affiliation	Members
Scottish National Party	35
Scottish Conservatives	13
Scottish Labour	7
Scottish Liberal Democrats	4
Total	59

== MPs ==
MP	Constituency	Party	In constituency since	Majority	Majority (%)
Hannah Bardell	Livingston	SNP	2015	3,878	7.4
Mhairi Black	Paisley and Renfrewshire South	SNP	2015	2,541	6.1
Ian Blackford	Ross, Skye and Lochaber	SNP	2015	5,919	15.4
Kirsty Blackman	Aberdeen North	SNP	2015	4,139	11.3
Andrew Bowie	West Aberdeenshire and Kincardine	Conservative	2017	7,950	15.4
Deidre Brock	Edinburgh North and Leith	SNP	2015	1,625	2.9
Alan Brown	Kilmarnock and Loudoun	SNP	2015	6,269	13.4
Lisa Cameron	East Kilbride, Strathaven and Lesmahagow	SNP	2015	3,866	7.2
Alistair Carmichael	Orkney and Shetland	Liberal Democrats	2001	4,563	19.6
Douglas Chapman	Dunfermline and West Fife	SNP	2015	844	1.6
Joanna Cherry	Edinburgh South West	SNP	2015	1,097	2.2
Colin Clark	Gordon	Conservative	2017	2,607	4.8
Ronnie Cowan	Inverclyde	SNP	2015	384	1.0
Angela Crawley	Lanark and Hamilton East	SNP	2015	266	0.5
Martyn Day	Linlithgow and East Falkirk	SNP	2015	2,919	5.2
Martin Docherty-Hughes	West Dunbartonshire	SNP	2015	2,288	5.2
David Duguid	Banff and Buchan	Conservative	2017	3,693	8.9
Marion Fellows	Motherwell and Wishaw	SNP	2015	318	0.7
Hugh Gaffney	Coatbridge, Chryston and Bellshill	Labour	2017	1,586	3.5
Stephen Gethins	North East Fife	SNP	2015	2	0.004
Patricia Gibson	North Ayrshire and Arran	SNP	2015	3,633	7.7
Patrick Grady	Glasgow North	SNP	2017	1,060	3.1
Luke Graham	Ochil and South Perthshire	Conservative	2017	3,359	6.2
Bill Grant	Ayr, Carrick and Cumnock	Conservative	2017	2,774	6.0
Peter Grant	Glenrothes	SNP	2015	3,267	8.1
Neil Gray	Airdrie and Shotts	SNP	2015	195	0.5
Kirstene Hair	Angus	Conservative	2017	2,645	6.6
Drew Hendry	Inverness, Nairn, Badenoch and Strathspey	SNP	2015	4,924	9.4
Stewart Hosie	Dundee East	SNP	2005	6,645	15.4
Alister Jack	Dumfries and Galloway	Conservative	2017	5,643	10.9
Christine Jardine	Edinburgh West	Liberal Democrats	2017	2,988	5.7
Stephen Kerr	Stirling	Conservative	2017	148	0.3
Ged Killen	Rutherglen and Hamilton West	Labour Co-op	2017	265	0.5
Lesley Laird	Kirkcaldy and Cowdenbeath	Labour	2017	259	0.5
John Lamont	Berwickshire, Roxburgh and Selkirk	Conservative	2017	11,060	21.1
Chris Law	Dundee West	SNP	2015	5,262	13.6
David Linden	Glasgow East	SNP	2017	75	0.2
Angus MacNeil	Na h-Eileanan an Iar	SNP	2005	1,007	6.7
Paul Masterton	East Renfrewshire	Conservative	2017	4,712	8.8
Stewart McDonald	Glasgow South	SNP	2015	2,027	4.5
Stuart McDonald	Cumbernauld, Kilsyth and Kirkintilloch East	SNP	2015	4,264	9.7
John McNally	Falkirk	SNP	2015	4,923	9.1
Carol Monaghan	Glasgow North West	SNP	2015	2,561	6.6
David Mundell	Dumfriesshire, Clydesdale and Tweeddale	Conservative	2005	9,441	19.3
Ian Murray	Edinburgh South	Labour	2017	15,514	32.4
Gavin Newlands	Paisley and Renfrewshire North	SNP	2015	2,613	5.6
Brendan O'Hara	Argyll and Bute	SNP	2015	1,328	2.8
Douglas Ross	Moray	Conservative	2017	4,159	8.7
Danielle Rowley	Midlothian	Labour	2017	885	2.0
Tommy Sheppard	Edinburgh East	SNP	2015	3,425	7.8
Chris Stephens	Glasgow South West	SNP	2015	60	0.2
Jamie Stone	Caithness, Sutherland and Easter Ross	Liberal Democrats	2017	2,044	6.6
Paul Sweeney	Glasgow North East	Labour Co-op	2017	242	0.7
Jo Swinson	East Dunbartonshire	Liberal Democrats	2017 (Note: Swinson previously served the constituency as MP from 2005 to 2015.)	5,339	10.3
Alison Thewliss	Glasgow Central	SNP	2015	2,267	6.3
Ross Thomson	Aberdeen South	Conservative	2017	4,752	10.6
Martin Whitfield	East Lothian	Labour	2017	3,083	5.5
Philippa Whitford	Central Ayrshire	SNP	2015	1,267	2.8
Pete Wishart	Perth and North Perthshire	SNP	2005 (Note: Wishart was formerly the MP for North Tayside since 2001 until the constituency was abolished.)	21	0.04

== See also ==
- Lists of MPs for constituencies in Scotland
