= List of Dead Ringers episodes =

Dead Ringers is a comedy impressions radio and TV show broadcast on BBC Radio 4 and later BBC Two.

== Radio series ==
=== Series 1 (2000) ===
The first series starred Alistair McGowan, Jon Culshaw, Simon Lipson, Kate Robbins (episodes 1–2) and Jan Ravens (episodes 3–4). The producers were Bill Dare, Danny Wallace and Mario Stylianides.

| No. overall | No. in series | Title | Written by | Original release date |
|---|---|---|---|---|
| 1 | 1 | "Episode 1" | Jon Holmes & Andy Hurst, Simon Blackwell, Nev Fountain & Tom Jamieson, Ivor Baddiel & Ashley Boroda, Marc Haynes, D. A. Barham, Ewan Marshall & Trevor Lloyd, Laurence Howarth, Gerard Foster, Rupert Russell & Richard Ayoade & Matt Holness, Yazz Fetto, Henry Naylor, George Jeffrie and Bert Tyler Moore | 7 January 2000 |
Celebrities impersonated: David Dimbleby, Jack Straw, Huw Edwards, Peter Sissons, Cherie Blair, Tony Blair, William Hague, Ffion Hague, John Humphrys, Nasser Hussain, Rolf Harris, Shaggy Rogers, Scooby-Doo, George J. Mitchell, Gerry Adams, Rev. Ian Paisley, Heineken advert narrator, Fourth Doctor (Tom Baker), Cliff Richard, Walking with Dinosaurs narrator (Kenneth Branagh), Ronnie Corbett, Des Lynam, Lily Savage (Paul O'Grady), Frank Skinner, Barry Norman, Brian Perkins, Alison Mitchell, Mammy Two Shoes, Michael Buerk, Dr. Anthony Clare, Hannibal Lecter (Anthony Hopkins), Droopy, Victoria Beckham, David Beckham, Dale Winton, Jeffrey Archer, Robert Robinson, Brian Sewell, Brian Blessed, Tom Paulin, Tony Parsons, Germaine Greer, Mark Lawson, Trevor McDonald, Hugh Grant. Programmes parodied: BBC News, Goldilocks and the Three Bears, Today, Animal Hospital, Walking with Dinosaurs, Money Box, 999 Lifesavers, In the Psychiatrist's Chair, Dale's Supermarket Sweep, Brain of Britain, Late Review, ITV News.
| 2 | 2 | "Episode 2" | Nev Fountain & Tom Jamieson, Jon Holmes & Andy Hurst, Simon Blackwell, Ivor Baddiel & Ashley Boroda, Gerard Foster, Henry Naylor, George Jeffrie & Bert Tyler Moore, Robin Ince & Ed Dyson, and Ali Crockatt & Mike Weedy | 14 January 2000 |
Celebrities impersonated: John Humphrys, Jack Straw, Brian Perkins, Michael Buerk, Terry Wogan, Griff Rhys Jones, Bob Geldof, Midge Ure, Cherie Blair, Columbo (Peter Falk), Madonna, Woody Allen, Auric Goldfinger (Gert Fröbe), James Bond (Pierce Brosnan), Sergeant Wilson (John Le Mesurier), Private Walker (James Beck), Lance Corporal Jones (Clive Dunn), Private Godfrey (Arnold Ridley), William Hague, Naseem Hamed, Heineken advert narrator, Tony Blair, Delia Smith, John Major, Emma Noble, Fourth Doctor (Tom Baker), Sister Lavinia Byrne, Rolf Harris, Road Runner, Huw Edwards, Ali G (Sacha Baron Cohen), Angus Deayton, Ian Hislop, John Lennon, Chris Tarrant, Alan Bennett, Dr. David Starkey, Janet Daley, Victoria Beckham, David Beckham, Matthew Kelly, Margaret Thatcher, Ingrid Tarrant, Ronnie Corbett. Programmes parodied: Today, Radio 4 News Bulletin, Children in Need appeal film, Comic Relief appeal film, Live Aid appeal film, Columbo, James Bond, Dad's Army, Delia's How to Cook 2, Animal Hospital, BBC News, Have I Got News for You, One to One, Who Wants to Be a Millionaire?, The Moral Maze, Stars in Their Eyes.
| 3 | 3 | "Episode 3" | Jon Holmes & Andy Hurst, Simon Blackwell, Nev Fountain & Tom Jamieson, Ivor Baddiel & Ashley Boroda, Robin Ince & Ed Dyson, D. A. Barham, Rupert Russell, Richard Ayoade & Matt Holness, Steve Cochrane, Laurence Howarth, Ewan Marshall & Trevor Lloyd, Marc Haynes, Marcus Harvard and Gerard Foster, with additional material by Oriane Messina & Fay Rusling & Terry Franks-Newman, Ian Fletcher, Toby Thunder, Arnie Sidebottom and Bolton Tipshifter | 21 January 2000 |
Celebrities impersonated: James Boyle, Jane McDonald, Jack Straw, Brian Perkins, Gerry Adams, Rev. Ian Paisley, Mo Mowlam, David Trimble, Huw Edwards, Jonathan Ross, Joe Pesci (as Frank Spencer), Betty Spencer (Michele Dotrice), Maddy Magellan (Caroline Quentin), Jonathan Creek (Alan Davies), Mohamed Al-Fayed, Prince Philip, Duke of Edinburgh, John Humphrys, Pope John Paul II, Tony Blair, Edward VIII, Marge Simpson, Charlotte Green, Quentin Willson, Mrs. Willson, Jeremy Clarkson, Fourth Doctor (Tom Baker), Columbo (Peter Falk), Michael Buerk, Victoria Beckham, David Beckham, Robert Robinson, George/Charles, Prince of Wales (Hugh Laurie), Edmund Blackadder (Rowan Atkinson), Baldrick (Tony Robinson), Alan Bennett, William Hague, Steven Norris, Ffion Hague, Shaggy Rogers, Scooby-Doo, Velma Dinkley, Jean-Luc Picard (Patrick Stewart), Hannibal Lecter (Anthony Hopkins), Delia Smith, Ronnie Corbett. Programmes parodied: Star for a Night, Great Moments in History, Film..., Some Mothers Do 'Ave 'Em, Jonathan Creek, Today, Business News, Top Gear, Columbo, The Choice, Brain of Britain, Blackadder, Scooby-Doo, Back to the Floor, Star Trek: The Next Generation, The Silence of the Lambs.
| 4 | 4 | "Episode 4" | Jon Holmes & Andy Hurst, Simon Blackwell, Nev Fountain & Tom Jamieson, Ivor Baddiel & Ashley Boroda, D. A. Barham, Rupert Russell, Richard Ayoade, Matt Holness, Laurence Howarth and Gerard Foster, with additional material by Jen Roberts & Paul Gannon, Arthur Spermbottom, Gospel McDonald, Anal Retentive and Espin Carnasbick | 28 January 2000 |
Celebrities impersonated: Michael Buerk, Roland Rat (David Claridge), John Peel, Batman narrator (William Dozier), David Dimbleby, William Hague, Robin Day (as Robin), Jeremy Paxman (as Batman), Brian Perkins, Charlotte Green, Jo Brand, Johnny Vaughan, Benjamin Braddock (Dustin Hoffman), Mrs. Robinson (Anne Bancroft), Robert Robinson, Anne Robinson, Huw Edwards, John Hegley, Trevor McDonald, Mohamed Al-Fayed, Cilla Black, Dame Edna Everage, Dale Winton, Sue Lawley, Steven Norris, Christine Buerk, Fourth Doctor (Tom Baker), Delia Smith, David Beckham, Victoria Beckham, Mark Lawson, Tom Paulin, Germaine Greer, Tony Parsons, Sue Barker, Tim Henman, Heineken advert narrator, Nick Higham, Jilly Goolden, Walter C. "Foggy" Dewhurst (Brian Wilde), Norman "Cleggy" Clegg/Wallace (Peter Sallis), John Humphrys, Jim Naughtie, Angus Deayton, Ian Hislop, M (Judi Dench), James Bond (Pierce Brosnan), Alan Bennett, Professor Stephen Hawking (as Michael Caine/Chris Eubank), Ronnie Corbett. Programmes parodied: BBC Nine O'Clock News, John Peel on Radio 1, Home Truths, Batman, Jo Brand's Commercial Breakdown, Moviewatch, The Graduate, BBC News, An Audience with..., Desert Island Discs, The Choice, Delia's How to Cook 2, Shipping Forecast, Late Review, Food and Drink, Last of the Summer Wine, Newsnight, Today, Have I Got News for You, James Bond, ITV News.

=== Series 2 (2000) ===
The second series saw Jon Culshaw and Jan Ravens joined by Kevin Connelly, Phil Cornwell (except episodes 6–7) and Mark Perry (episodes 5–8). Adam Bromley joined as associate producer alongside producer Bill Dare. Episode 8 was the first to have Jon Culshaw read the closing credits in his now traditional Tom Baker voice.

| No. overall | No. in series | Title | Written by | Original release date |
|---|---|---|---|---|
| 5 | 1 | "Episode 1" | Jon Holmes & Andy Hurst, Nev Fountain & Tom Jamieson, Simon Blackwell, Gez Foster, Ashley Boroda, Laurence Howarth, Dave Cohen & Paul McKenzie, Shaun Pye, Rupert Russell, Richard Webb, Martin Smith, Alison Todd and Geoffrey Stubson | 16 June 2000 |
Celebrities impersonated: Charlotte Green, Brian Perkins, Des Lynam, Jimmy Hill, Delia Smith, Jamie Oliver, Hugh Johnson, Loyd Grossman, John Peel, Peggy Mitchell (Barbara Windsor), Pat Butcher (Pam St. Clement), Darth Vader (James Earl Jones), Rolf Harris, Thora Hird, Johnny Vaughan, Woody Allen (as Isaac Newton), Clint Eastwood (as Geoff Hurst), Arnold Schwarzenegger (as Kenneth Wolstenholme), Fourth Doctor (Tom Baker), Dalek, Leo Blair, Cherie Blair, Tony Blair, Ricky Butcher (Sid Owen), Phil Mitchell (Steve McFadden), Elton John, Demi Moore (as Emmeline Pankhurst), Michael Caine (as William Ewart Gladstone), Hyacinth Bucket (Patricia Routledge), Hannibal Lecter (Anthony Hopkins), Alan Bennett, Gary Lineker, Jack Nicholson (as Mr Praline), Robert De Niro (as The Shopkeeper), Clarrie Grundy (Heather Bell), Eddie Grundy (Trevor Harrison). Programmes parodied: The News Quiz, ITV UEFA Euro 2000 coverage, Delia's How to Cook 2, EastEnders, Radio 4 Appeal, Moviewatch, G.I. Jane, Match of the Day (UEFA Euro 2000), Monty Python's Flying Circus (Dead Parrot sketch), The Archers.
| 6 | 2 | "Episode 2" | Nev Fountain & Tom Jamieson, Jon Holmes & Andy Hurst, Simon Blackwell, Gez Foster, Ashley Boroda, Laurence Howarth, Dave Cohen & Paul McKenzie, Steve Punt, Shaun Pye, Richard Webb, Rupert Russell, Henry Naylor, Martin Smith, Alison Todd, Manchit Bob and Geoffrey Stubson | 23 June 2000 |
Celebrities impersonated: Gary Lineker, Kevin Keegan, Tony Blair, Jack Straw, Hyacinth Bucket (Patricia Routledge), John Humphrys, Rolf Harris, Ned Sherrin, Charlotte Green, Clarrie Grundy (Heather Bell), Joe Grundy (Edward Kelsey), David Bowie, Brian Perkins, Henry Blofeld, Donna Symmonds, Richie Benaud, Nick Ross, Yogi Bear, Boo-Boo Bear, Ranger Smith, Top Cat, Brain, Benny the Ball, Officer Charlie Dibble, Fourth Doctor (Tom Baker), John Motson, Barry Davies, Alan Hansen, Alison Mitchell, Ralph Fiennes, Fourth Citizen, Leonard Rossiter (as Coriolanus & Maurice Bendrix), Sarah Miles (Julianne Moore), Johnny Vaughan, Barbara Good (Felicity Kendal), Jack Nicholson (as Jeremy "Jerry" Leadbetter), Robert De Niro (as Tom Good), Alan Bennett, Brian Sewell. Programmes parodied: Match of the Day (UEFA Euro 2000), Thunderbirds, Today, Counterpoint, The Archers, Test Match Special, Crimewatch, The Yogi Bear Show, Top Cat, Money Box Live, Coriolanus, The End of the Affair, Moviewatch, The Good Life, 2000 Turner Prize nominations.
| 7 | 3 | "Episode 3" | Jon Holmes & Andy Hurst, Nev Fountain & Tom Jamieson, Simon Blackwell, Gez Foster, Ashley Boroda, Laurence Howarth, Dave Cohen & Paul McKenzie, Shaun Pye, Steve Punt, Steve Parry, Richard Webb, Rupert Russell, Henry Naylor, Martin Smith, Alison Todd, Manchit Bob and Geoffrey Stubson | 30 June 2000 |
Celebrities impersonated: Charlotte Green, Barry McGuigan, Harry Carpenter, Hyacinth Bucket (Patricia Routledge), Brian Perkins, Kate Adie, Ruth Archer (Felicity Finch), Eddie Grundy (Trevor Harrison), Clarrie Grundy (Heather Bell), Carol Vorderman, Fourth Doctor (Tom Baker), Alistair Cooke, Michael Buerk, Pat Butcher (Pam St. Clement), Fred Elliott (John Savident), David Lloyd, Tony Lewis, Geoffrey Boycott, Johnny Vaughan, Richard Wilson (as Lieutenant Colonel William "Bill" Kilgore/Victor Meldrew), Sue MacGregor, John Humphrys, Rabbi Lionel Blue, Sue Barker, Greg Rusedski, Ned Sherrin, Jerry Springer, Gary Lineker, Alan Hansen, Tony Blair, Rolf Harris, Liam Gallagher, Noël Coward, Jack Nicholson (as William "Compo" Simmonite), Robert De Niro (as Walter C. "Foggy" Dewhurst), Alan Bennett, Alison Mitchell, Frank Skinner, Ann Widdecombe, William Hague, Davros, John Inman (as The Doctor/Mr. Humphries), Dalek. Programmes parodied: Grandstand, From Our Own Correspondent, The Archers, Countdown, Letter from America, 999, EastEnders, Coronation Street, Test Match Special, Moviewatch, Apocalypse Now, One Foot in the Grave, Today, Thought for the Day, Counterpoint, Match of the Day, Last of the Summer Wine, Money Box Live, Book at Bedtime, Doctor Who, Are You Being Served?
| 8 | 4 | "Episode 4" | Jon Holmes & Andy Hurst, Nev Fountain & Tom Jamieson, Jon Culshaw, Simon Blackwell, Dave Cohen & Paul McKenzie, Gez Foster, Laurence Howarth, Shaun Pye, Richard Webb and Henry Naylor | 7 July 2000 |
Celebrities impersonated: Tony Blair, Euan Blair, Cherie Blair, Tim Henman, Auric Goldfinger (Gert Fröbe), James Bond (Sean Connery), John Humphrys, Sue MacGregor, William Hague, Carol Smillie, Fourth Doctor (Tom Baker), Linda Barker, Frank Skinner, Charlotte Green, Rolf Harris, Henry Blofeld, Richie Benaud, Fred Trueman, Gary Lineker, Alan Hansen, Martin O'Neill, Brian Perkins, Alastair Stewart, Mr. Magoo, Murray Walker, James Bond (Pierce Brosnan), Henry Blofeld (as Ernst Stavro Blofeld), Melvyn Bragg, Tom Baker (as Prince Hamlet), Richard Wilson (as Horatio/Victor Meldrew), Rupert Rigsby (Leonard Rossiter), Prunella Scales (as Juliet/Sybil Fawlty), Harry H. Corbett (as Romeo/Harold Steptoe), Albert Steptoe (Wilfrid Brambell), David Beckham, Victoria Beckham, Dick Dastardly, Muttley, Penelope Pitstop, Professor Pat Pending, Shaggy Rogers, Alan Bennett, Clive Anderson, Thora Hird. Programmes parodied: James Bond, Today, Changing Rooms, Doctor Who, Radio 4 News Bulletin, Test Match Special, Match of the Day, Police Camera Action!, The Mr. Magoo Show, Formula One, The South Bank Show, Hamlet, Romeo and Juliet, Wacky Races, Scooby-Doo, Radio 4 Appeal, Animal Hospital.
| 9 | 5 | "Episode 5" | Jon Holmes & Andy Hurst, Nev Fountain & Tom Jamieson, Simon Blackwell, Dave Cohen & Paul McKenzie, Gez Foster, Laurence Howarth, Jon Culshaw and Henry Naylor | 14 July 2000 |
Celebrities impersonated: Trevor McDonald, John Birt, John Humphrys, Sue MacGregor, William Hague, Carol Smillie, Jean-Luc Picard (Patrick Stewart), Linda Barker, Captain Kirk (William Shatner), Johnny Vaughan, Maximus Decimus Meridius (Russell Crowe), Rupert Rigsby (Leonard Rossiter), Les Dawson, Miss Gossage (Joyce Grenfell), Brian Perkins, Jerry Springer, Shaggy Rogers, Scooby-Doo, Velma Dinkley, Brian Sewell (as Tom Baker/Frank Bruno), Kevin Keegan, Dale Winton, Barbara Windsor, Fourth Doctor (Tom Baker), Robin Cook, Ethan Hunt (Tom Cruise), Tommy Cooper, Janet Hansen, Alan Hansen, Michael Buerk, Charlotte Green, Graham Norton, Chris Eubank, Matthew Kelly, Patrick Moore, Charlie Dimmock, Rev. Ian Paisley, Gerry Adams, Alan Bennett, Dalek. Programmes parodied: ITV News at Ten, Today, Changing Rooms, Star Trek: The Next Generation, Moviewatch, Gladiator, The Jerry Springer Show, Scooby-Doo, Showbiz Pals, Mission: Impossible, 999, Thought for the Day, So Graham Norton, Question Time, Celebrity Stars in Their Eyes, Charlie's Garden Army, Doctor Who.
| 10 | 6 | "Episode 6" | Jon Holmes & Andy Hurst, Nev Fountain & Tom Jamieson, Simon Blackwell, Dave Cohen & Paul McKenzie, Gez Foster, Laurence Howarth, Jon Culshaw and Henry Naylor | 21 July 2000 |
Celebrities impersonated: Trevor McDonald, Tony Blair, Shaggy Rogers, Scooby-Doo, Velma Dinkley, Dale Winton, Barbara Windsor, Graham Norton, Charlotte Green, Jim Naughtie, Hyacinth Bucket (Patricia Routledge), Brian Perkins, Johnny Vaughan, The Terminator (Arnold Schwarzenegger), Thora Hird (as T-1000), Paul Gascoigne, Alistair Cooke, Michael Parkinson, Ross Kemp (as Queen Elizabeth The Queen Mother), Edward VIII, Wallis Simpson, Robin Cook, William Hague, Wallace (Peter Sallis), John Prescott, Liz Barclay, John Waite, Fourth Doctor (Tom Baker), Carol Smillie, Darth Vader (James Earl Jones), Linda Barker, Alan Bennett. Programmes parodied: The Queen Mother's 100th Birthday Parade, Scooby-Doo, Showbiz Pals, Radio 4 News Bulletin, Moviewatch, Terminator 2: Judgment Day, Letter from America, Parkinson, Shipping Forecast, You and Yours, Changing Rooms, Star Wars.
| 11 | 7 | "Episode 7" | Jon Holmes & Andy Hurst, Nev Fountain & Tom Jamieson, Simon Blackwell, Dave Cohen & Paul McKenzie, Laurence Howarth, Jon Culshaw and Henry Naylor | 28 July 2000 |
Celebrities impersonated: John Humphrys, Sue MacGregor, Jim Naughtie (as Graham Norton), Alastair Stewart, Jack Straw, David Frost, Loyd Grossman, Dalek, Charlotte Green, Captain Kirk (William Shatner), Mr. Scott (James Doohan), Robin Cook, Brian Perkins, Libby Purves, Chris Tarrant, Henry Blofeld, Dustin Hoffman, Brian Sewell, Dale Winton, Bernard Manning, Frank Bruno, John Major, Sylvester Stallone, Peter O'Sullevan, John Prescott, Ned Sherrin, Charlie Dimmock, Alan Titchmarsh, Chris Eubank, Rolf Harris, Fred Trueman, Jerry Springer, Yogi Bear, Boo-Boo Bear, Sara Cox, Des Lynam, Alan Bennett. Programmes parodied: Today, Police Camera Action!, Through the Keyhole, Doctor Who, Star Trek: The Original Series, Midweek, Loose Ends, Ground Force, Test Match Special, The Jerry Springer Show, The Yogi Bear Show, The Radio 1 Breakfast Show, Alien.
| 12 | 8 | "Episode 8" | Jon Holmes & Andy Hurst, Nev Fountain & Tom Jamieson, Simon Blackwell, Dave Cohen & Paul McKenzie, Gerard Foster, Jon Culshaw, Shaun Pye, Ashley Boroda, Henry Naylor and Steve Parry | 4 August 2000 |
Celebrities impersonated: Rev. Geraldine Granger (Dawn French), Gordon Brown, Tony Blair, Ross Kemp, William Hague, Charlotte Green, John Humphrys, Robin Cook, John Prescott, Carol Smillie, Harold Steptoe (Harry H. Corbett), Albert Steptoe (Wilfrid Brambell), Linda Barker, Brian Perkins, Jeremy Clarkson, Libby Purves, Johnny Vaughan, Robert De Niro (as Captain Flack), Jack Nicholson (as Dibble), Alistair Cooke, Charlie Dimmock, Alan Titchmarsh, Rolf Harris, Carol Vorderman, Dale Winton, Naseem Hamed, Ian Hislop, Chris Tarrant, John Inman, Patrick Moore, Alan Bennett, Fourth Doctor (Tom Baker). Programmes parodied: The Vicar of Dibley, Today, Changing Rooms, Steptoe and Son, Woman's Hour, Top Gear, Midweek, Moviewatch, Trumpton, Letter from America, Ground Force, Animal Hospital, Countdown, Book at Bedtime, A Tale of Two Cities, Shipping Forecast, Who Wants to Be a Millionaire?

=== Series 3 (2000) ===
The third series starred Jon Culshaw, Jan Ravens, Mark Perry, Lewis MacLeod (episode 1), Phil Cornwell (episodes 2–3) and Kevin Connelly (episodes 4–5). The producer was Bill Dare and associate producer was Adam Bromley (episode 3 only).

| No. overall | No. in series | Title | Written by | Original release date |
|---|---|---|---|---|
| 13 | 1 | "Episode 1" | Nev Fountain & Tom Jamieson, Laurence Howarth, Dan Robins & Dan Tetsell, Jon Culshaw, Jon Holmes, Dave Cohen & Paul McKenzie, George Poles & Simon Littlefield and Mike Barfield | 17 November 2000 |
Celebrities impersonated: John Humphrys, Sue MacGregor, Robin Cook, David Beckham, Bill Clinton, Charlotte Green, Rolf Harris, Anne Robinson, Nick Ross, Inspector Morse (John Thaw), Hetty Wainthropp (Patricia Routledge), Brian Perkins, Michael Parkinson, Ross Kemp (as Harry Potter), Brian Blessed (as Lord Voldemort), Jean-Luc Picard (Patrick Stewart), Darth Vader (James Earl Jones), Obi-Wan Kenobi (Alec Guinness), Fourth Doctor (Tom Baker), William Hague, Clarrie Grundy (Heather Bell), Eddie Grundy (Trevor Harrison), Carol Smillie, Linda Barker, Robert Robinson, Michael Buerk, Craig Phillips, John Prescott, Peter Mandelson, Trevor McDonald, Mickey Mouse, Pluto, Goofy, Donald Duck, Alan Bennett, Melvyn Bragg, Germaine Greer, Des Lynam. Programmes parodied: Today, Animal Hospital, The Weakest Link, Crimewatch, Inspector Morse, Parkinson, Harry Potter and the Philosopher's Stone, The Archers, Changing Rooms, Brain of Britain, BBC Nine O'Clock News, ITV 2000 US Election coverage, In Our Time.
| 14 | 2 | "Episode 2" | Tom Jamieson & Nev Fountain, Laurence Howarth, Danny Robins & Dan Tetsell, Gerard Foster, Simon Blackwell, George Poles & Simon Littlefield, Jon Holmes, Jon Culshaw and James Cary | 24 November 2000 |
Celebrities impersonated: Rolf Harris, Tony Blair, Robin Cook, Johnny Vaughan, Brian Perkins, Libby Purves, Kate Adie, Charlotte Green, Anne Robinson, John Humphrys, Sue MacGregor, Craig Phillips, Arnold Schwarzenegger, Robert De Niro, Jack Nicholson, Clement Freud, Brian Sewell, Alistair Cooke, Greg Dyke (as Michael Caine), Graham Norton, Mariella Frostrup, Melvyn Bragg, Richard Wilson (as Victor Meldrew), Robert Robinson, Alan Bennett, Shaggy Rogers, Scooby-Doo, Velma Dinkley, Carol Smillie, Linda Barker, Trevor McDonald, Margaret Thatcher, Fourth Doctor (Tom Baker). Programmes parodied: Animal Hospital, Moviewatch, Charlie's Angels, The Weakest Link, Today, Just a Minute, Letter from America, Panorama, So Graham Norton, The Routes of English, Brain of Britain, Scooby-Doo, Changing Rooms.
| 15 | 3 | "Episode 3" | Tom Jamieson & Nev Fountain, Laurence Howarth, Danny Robins & Dan Tetsell, Jon Culshaw, George Poles & Simon Littlefield, Adam Bromley and Jon Holmes | 1 December 2000 |
Celebrities impersonated: Trevor McDonald, William Hague, John Humphrys, Sue MacGregor, Lord Voldemort, Carol Smillie, Laurence Llewelyn-Bowen, Linda Barker, Charlotte Green, John Waite, Liz Barclay, Greg Dyke (as Michael Caine), Johnny Vaughan, Maximus Decimus Meridius (Russell Crowe), Rolf Harris, Ann Widdecombe, Michael Buerk, Kate Adie, Anne Robinson, Harold Steptoe (Harry H. Corbett), Albert Steptoe (Wilfrid Brambell), Will Self, Brian Perkins, Hannibal Lecter (Anthony Hopkins), Clarice Starling (Jodie Foster), Robin Cook, Gaynor Cook, Alan Bennett, Sarah Connor (Linda Hamilton), The Terminator (Arnold Schwarzenegger), Mrs Overall (Julie Walters), Boy George, Fourth Doctor (Tom Baker). Programmes parodied: ITV News at Ten, Today, Harry Potter, Changing Rooms, You and Yours, Moviewatch, Gladiator, The Choice, From Our Own Correspondent, The Weakest Link, Steptoe and Son, Will Self's Saturday Essay, The A-Team, The Silence of the Lambs, Book at Bedtime, Terminator 3: Rise of the Machines.
| 16 | 4 | "Episode 4" | Tom Jamieson & Nev Fountain, Laurence Howarth, Danny Robins & Dan Tetsell, Simon Blackwell, Gerard Foster, George Poles & Simon Littlefield, Paul Sassienie & Howard Ricklow, Jon Holmes and Jon Culshaw | 8 December 2000 |
Celebrities impersonated: Tony Blair, Anne Robinson, Rupert Rigsby (Leonard Rossiter), Ruth Jones (Frances de la Tour), Darth Vader (James Earl Jones), Fourth Doctor (Tom Baker), Charlotte Green, Sue Lawley, Ian Hislop, Loyd Grossman, Rolf Harris, Professor Sam Ryan (Amanda Burton), Rabbi Lionel Blue, Richard Wilson (as Victor Meldrew), John Humphrys, Sue MacGregor, John Prescott, Robin Cook, George W. Bush, Brian Perkins, James Bond (Pierce Brosnan), Carol Smillie, Linda Barker, Handy Andy, Ned Sherrin, Judi Dench, Donald Sinden, Victoria Wood, Prunella Scales, Dr. Anthony Clare, Libby Purves, Michael Buerk, William Hague, Robert Falcon Scott, Lawrence Oates, Ann Widdecombe. Programmes parodied: The Weakest Link, Rising Damp, Desert Island Discs, Through the Keyhole, Animal Hospital, Silent Witness, Thought for the Day, Today, James Bond, Changing Rooms, Loose Ends, Jack and the Beanstalk (pantomime), Sleeping Beauty (pantomime), Cinderella (pantomime), The Choice, Snow White (pantomime), Aladdin (pantomime).
| 17 | 5 | "Episode 5" | Tom Jamieson & Nev Fountain, Laurence Howarth, Danny Robins & Dan Tetsell, Simon Blackwell, George Poles & Simon Littlefield, Jon Holmes, Jon Culshaw and Mike Barfield | 15 December 2000 |
Celebrities impersonated: John Humphrys, Sue MacGregor, Mark Lawson, Germaine Greer, Tom Paulin, Mariella Frostrup, Michael Buerk, Dale Winton, Brian Perkins, Johnny Vaughan, Jesus, Anne Robinson, Simon, who is called Peter, Thomas the Apostle, Judas Iscariot, Charlotte Green, Ann Widdecombe, Robin Cook, Fourth Doctor (Tom Baker), Kate Adie, Tiny Clanger, Major Clanger, The Soup Dragon, Nick Ross, Carol Smillie, Linda Barker, Michael Berkeley, Terry Wogan, William Hague, Henry Blofeld, Fred Trueman, Alan Bennett, Robbie Williams. Programmes parodied: Today, The Arts Zone, The Choice, Moviewatch, Jesus of Nazareth, The Weakest Link, Shipping Forecast, From Our Own Correspondent, Clangers, Crimewatch, Changing Rooms, BBC Radio 3, BBC Radio 2, Test Match Special.

=== Special (2001) ===
The special was aired as part of The Archers 50th anniversary celebrations on Radio 4. It starred Jon Culshaw, Jan Ravens, Mark Perry and Kevin Connelly. Jeremy Pascall served as The Archers consultant and the producer was Bill Dare.

| No. overall | No. in series | Title | Written by | Original release date |
|---|---|---|---|---|
| 18 | – | "The Archers Special" | Tom Jamieson & Nev Fountain, Simon Blackwell, Dave Cohen & Paul McKenzie, Jon Holmes and Jon Culshaw | 1 January 2001 |
Celebrities impersonated: Ned Sherrin, Dan Archer (Harry Oakes), Walter Gabriel (Chris Gittins), Jack Woolley (Arnold Peters), Peggy Woolley (June Spencer), Hannibal Lecter (Anthony Hopkins), Alfred Hitchcock, Sid Perks (Alan Devereux), Jolene Rogers (Buffy Davis), Charlotte Green, Ruth Archer (Felicity Finch), Fourth Doctor (Tom Baker), Chris Eubank, Tony Blair, John Humphrys, Clarrie Grundy (Heather Bell), Phil Archer (Norman Painting), Bert Fry (Roger Hume), Joe Grundy (Edward Kelsey), Brian Perkins, Graham Norton, Mariella Frostrup, Michael Parkinson, Norman Painting, Peter Snow, David Archer (Timothy Bentinck), Ann Widdecombe, Eddie Grundy (Trevor Harrison), Lynda Snell (Carole Boyd), Anne Robinson, Brian Aldridge (Charles Collingwood). Programmes parodied: The Archers, The Silence of the Lambs, Alfred Hitchcock Presents, On the Ropes, Radio 4 News Bulletin, So Graham Norton, Parkinson, Mastermind, Book at Bedtime, The Weakest Link.

=== Series 4 (2001) ===
The fourth series starred Jon Culshaw, Jan Ravens, Mark Perry, Kevin Connelly (except episode 3) and Phil Cornwell (episode 3). Mario Stylianides returned as producer with Bill Dare being credited as the programmes deviser.

| No. overall | No. in series | Title | Written by | Original release date |
|---|---|---|---|---|
| 19 | 1 | "Episode 1" | Tom Jamieson & Nev Fountain, Jon Holmes, Laurence Howarth, Dave Cohen, Richard Lewis and Jon Culshaw | 6 April 2001 |
Celebrities impersonated: Charlotte Green, Brian Perkins, Tony Blair, Dr. Tim Hathaway (Jay Villiers), Ruth Archer (Felicity Finch), Josh Archer, Jonathan Ross, The Terminator (Arnold Schwarzenegger), Obi-Wan Kenobi (Alec Guinness), Maximus Decimus Meridius (Russell Crowe), George W. Bush, John Prescott, Jerry Springer, Dale Winton, Barbara Windsor, Graham Norton, John Humphrys, Sue MacGregor, William Hague, Master Yoda (Frank Oz), King Arthur, Anne Robinson, Merlin, Lancelot, Pat Butcher (Pam St. Clement), John Motson, Glenn Hoddle, Clarrie Grundy (Heather Bell), Eddie Grundy (Trevor Harrison), Professor Sam Ryan (Amanda Burton), Jim Naughtie, Alan Bennett, Rabbi Lionel Blue, Sister Lavinia Byrne, John Peel. Programmes parodied: The Now Show, The Archers, Film..., Open University, The Jerry Springer Show, Today, The Weakest Link, EastEnders, Silent Witness, Thought for the Day.
| 20 | 2 | "Episode 2" | Tom Jamieson & Nev Fountain, Jon Holmes, Laurence Howarth, Jon Culshaw, Dave Cohen and Paul McKenzie | 13 April 2001 |
Celebrities impersonated: Charlotte Green, George W. Bush, Robin Cook, Michael Parkinson, Robbie Williams, Gerry Adams, Tony Blair, John Humphrys, Sue MacGregor, Darth Vader (James Earl Jones), Graham Norton, Dale Winton, Brian Sewell, Fergal Keane, Bob Geldof, Hyacinth Bucket (Patricia Routledge), Patrick Moore, Melvyn Bragg, Clarrie Grundy (Heather Bell), Joe Grundy (Edward Kelsey), John Motson, Sven-Göran Eriksson, Frank Bruno, DS Robbie Lewis (Kevin Whately), John Savident, Eminem, Mark Lawson, Ruth Archer (Felicity Finch). Programmes parodied: BBC World Service, Parkinson, Today, BBC Crime Doubles strand, English Tourist Board advert, The Sky at Night, The Archers, Children's Hour, Front Row.
| 21 | 3 | "Episode 3" | Tom Jamieson & Nev Fountain, Jon Holmes, Laurence Howarth, Jon Culshaw, Dave Cohen & Paul McKenzie, Anthony Bond & Danny Fielder and Mike Haskins | 20 April 2001 |
Celebrities impersonated: William Hague, Jonathan Ross, Richard Whiteley, Jack Nicholson, Robert De Niro, Ken Livingstone, Melvyn Bragg, Walter Gabriel (Chris Gittins), Brian Blessed, Elizabeth I of England (Glenda Jackson), Brian Perkins, Trevor McDonald, Anne Robinson, Ronald Reagan, George W. Bush, Abraham Lincoln, Bill Clinton, Tony Blair, Clare Short, Robin Cook, Charlotte Green, Kate Adie, Rabbi Lionel Blue, John Peel, Ruth Archer (Felicity Finch), Antonius Proximo (Oliver Reed), Maximus Decimus Meridius (Russell Crowe), Frank Bruno, Lennox Lewis, Chris Eubank, Graham Norton, Sheriff Al Chambers (John McIntire), Dr. Fred Richman (Simon Oakland), Simon Bates, Thora Hird, Donald Sinden, Albert Steptoe (Wilfrid Brambell), Harold Steptoe (Harry H. Corbett), Darth Vader (James Earl Jones), Obi-Wan Kenobi (Alec Guinness), Master Yoda (Frank Oz), Ann Widdecombe, Mariella Frostrup, Patrick Moore, Alan Bennett. Programmes parodied: Film..., Countdown, The South Bank Show, Elizabeth R, The Exchange, ITV News at Ten, The Weakest Link, Pick of the Week, Thought for the Day, Home Truths, The Archers, So Graham Norton, Psycho, Our Tune, Bridget Jones's Diary, Star Wars.
| 22 | 4 | "Episode 4" | Tom Jamieson & Nev Fountain, Jon Holmes, Laurence Howarth, Jon Culshaw and Dave Cohen | 27 April 2001 |
Celebrities impersonated: Tony Blair, Brian Perkins, Jack Woolley (Arnold Peters), Clarrie Grundy (Heather Bell), Ruth Archer (Felicity Finch), Brian Sewell, Carol Smillie, Linda Barker, Peggy Mitchell (Barbara Windsor), Pat Butcher (Pam St. Clement), Clare Short, Professor Sam Ryan (Amanda Burton), Charlotte Green, Joe Grundy (Edward Kelsey), Robin Cook, Michael Buerk, Kate Adie, Trevor McDonald, Ronnie Corbett (as Eddie Mair), Fourth Doctor (Tom Baker), Michael Kitchen, William Hague, Michael Berkeley, Frank Bruno, Chris Eubank, Lennox Lewis, Hannibal Lecter (Anthony Hopkins), Clarice Starling (Jodie Foster), John Humphrys, Sue MacGregor, Sister Lavinia Byrne (as Les Dawson), Dale Winton, Fergal Keane, Patrick Moore (as Inspector Morse), DS Robbie Lewis (Kevin Whately), George W. Bush. Programmes parodied: The Archers, BBC Crime Doubles strand, EastEnders, Silent Witness, BBC Ten O'Clock News, ITV News at Ten, Broadcasting House, Faking It, BBC Radio 3, The Silence of the Lambs, Today, Thought for the Day, Inspector Morse, Fight Club.

=== Special (2001) ===
This special marked the 2001 general election. It starred Jon Culshaw, Jan Ravens, Mark Perry and Kevin Connelly. The programme was devised by Bill Dare and the producer was Mario Stylianides.

| No. overall | No. in series | Title | Written by | Original release date |
|---|---|---|---|---|
| 23 | – | "Election 2001 Special" | Tom Jamieson & Nev Fountain, Jon Holmes, Laurence Howarth, Jon Culshaw and Dave Cohen | 6 June 2001 |
Celebrities impersonated: John Humphrys, Sue MacGregor, Obi-Wan Kenobi (Alec Guinness), Jim Naughtie (as Master Yoda (Frank Oz)), George W. Bush, Jenna Bush, Brian Perkins, William Hague, Ffion Hague (as Neil Kinnock), Cherie Blair (as John Major), Rolf Harris, Charlotte Green, Jack Woolley (Arnold Peters), Eddie Grundy (Trevor Harrison), Clarrie Grundy (Heather Bell), Joe Grundy (Edward Kelsey), Lynda Snell (Carole Boyd), Brian Aldridge (Charles Collingwood), Ruth Archer (Felicity Finch), Maximus Decimus Meridius (Russell Crowe), John Savident (as Mother), Frank Bruno (as Jack), John Prescott (as The Giant), Hyacinth Bucket (Patricia Routledge), Tony Blair, Carol Smillie, Linda Barker, Peter Mandelson, Ali G (Sacha Baron Cohen), Charles Kennedy, Alan Bennett, Fourth Doctor (Tom Baker). Programmes parodied: Today, Star Wars, Radio 4 News Bulletin, The Archers, Gladiator, Jack and the Beanstalk (pantomime), Changing Rooms.

=== Series 5 (2001) ===
The fifth series starred Jon Culshaw, Jan Ravens, Mark Perry, Kevin Connelly and Matthew Cox (episode 3). Bill Dare returned as producer. Episode 1 was recorded at the Edinburgh Festival Fringe. The recording of the fourth and final episode of this series, due to be broadcast on 14 September 2001, was cancelled, following the September 11 attacks.

| No. overall | No. in series | Title | Written by | Original release date |
|---|---|---|---|---|
| 24 | 1 | "Episode 1" | Tom Jamieson & Nev Fountain, Jon Holmes, Laurence Howarth, Ged Parsons, Jon Culshaw and Richard Lewis | 24 August 2001 |
Celebrities impersonated: Trevor McDonald, Brian Perkins, Melvyn Bragg, Robert Robinson, Dr. David Starkey, Germaine Greer, David Beckham, Graham Norton, Brian Dowling, Martin Jarvis, Sue Lawley, Rabbi Lionel Blue, Big Brother narrator (Marcus Bentley), Jonathan Ross, Hyacinth Bucket (Patricia Routledge), Jonathan Dimbleby, Ken Clarke, Clare Short, Robin Cook, David Bowie, Charlotte Green, John Waite, Liz Barclay, William Hague, John Major, Margaret Thatcher, Patrick Moore, Matt Smith, Judi Dench, Brian Sewell, Simon Bates, John Humphrys, Sue MacGregor, Shaggy Rogers, Velma Dinkley, Scooby-Doo, Michael Parkinson, Richard Wilson, Clarrie Grundy (Heather Bell), Jack Woolley (Arnold Peters), Joe Grundy (Edward Kelsey), Ruth Archer (Felicity Finch). Programmes parodied: In Our Time, So Graham Norton, Desert Island Discs, Big Brother, Film..., Buffy the Vampire Slayer, Any Questions?, You and Yours, The Sky at Night, Go4It, Our Tune, Today, Scooby-Doo, Parkinson, The Archers.
| 25 | 2 | "Episode 2" | Tom Jamieson & Nev Fountain, Jon Holmes, Laurence Howarth, Jon Culshaw and Dave Cohen | 31 August 2001 |
Celebrities impersonated: George W. Bush, Count von Count, Michael Buerk, Dr. David Starkey, Charlotte Green, Martin Jarvis, Simon Bates, Brian Perkins, Judi Dench, Janet Street-Porter, Fred Dibnah, Libby Purves, Tom Paulin, Ian Hislop, Trevor McDonald, Patrick Moore, Big Brother narrator (Marcus Bentley), Clarrie Grundy (Heather Bell), Eddie Grundy (Trevor Harrison), Joe Grundy (Edward Kelsey), Lynda Snell (Carole Boyd), Brian Aldridge (Charles Collingwood), Ruth Archer (Felicity Finch), Elton John, Matt Smith, Will Self, Tracey Emin, Ned Sherrin, Shaggy, Eminem. Programmes parodied: The Choice, The Moral Maze, Bridget Jones's Diary, Our Tune, Radio 4 Appeal, Celebrity Sleepover, Midweek, ITV News at Ten, Big Brother, The Archers, Go4It, Counterpoint, Sesame Street.
| 26 | 3 | "Episode 3" | Tom Jamieson & Nev Fountain, Jon Holmes, Laurence Howarth, Jon Culshaw and Dave Cohen | 7 September 2001 |
Celebrities impersonated: Tony Blair, John Humphrys, Sue MacGregor, Will Self, Rabbi Lionel Blue, John Motson, Sven-Göran Eriksson, Melvyn Bragg, Shaggy, Eminem, Jonathan Ross, Velma Dinkley, Russell Crowe (as Maximus Decimus Meridius/Shaggy Rogers), John Gielgud (as Scooby-Doo), Kirsty Wark, Iain Duncan Smith, William Hague, Charlotte Green, Ken Livingstone, Brian Sewell, Phil Collins, Dick Dastardly, Muttley, Brian Perkins, Clarrie Grundy (Heather Bell), Eddie Grundy (Trevor Harrison), Joe Grundy (Edward Kelsey), Jack Woolley (Arnold Peters), Ruth Archer (Felicity Finch), Janet Street-Porter, Dalek, Fourth Doctor (Tom Baker), Michael Berkeley, Frank Bruno, Rick from The Young Ones (Rik Mayall), Trevor McDonald, Patrick Moore, Jenni Murray, Germaine Greer, Benjamin Braddock (Dustin Hoffman), Sue Ellen Ewing (Linda Gray) as Mrs. Robinson, J. R. Ewing (Larry Hagman), Matt Smith, Richard Burton, Cromarty the space cat, Obi-Wan Kenobi (Alec Guinness), Master Yoda (Frank Oz). Programmes parodied: Today, Thought for the Day, Match of the Day, In Our Time, Film..., Scooby-Doo, Newsnight, The Archers, Celebrity Sleepover, BBC Radio 3, Private Passions, ITV News, Woman's Hour, The South Bank Show, Dallas, The Graduate, Go4It.

=== Series 6 (2001–02) ===
The sixth series starred Jon Culshaw, Jan Ravens, Mark Perry, Kevin Connelly and Phil Cornwell (episodes 3–5). Mario Stylianides returned as producer with Bill Dare again credited as the programmes deviser.

| No. overall | No. in series | Title | Written by | Original release date |
|---|---|---|---|---|
| 27 | 1 | "Episode 1" | Tom Jamieson & Nev Fountain, Jon Holmes, Laurence Howarth, Jon Culshaw, Danny Robins, Dan Tetsell, Dave Cohen and Tony Roche | 7 December 2001 |
Celebrities impersonated: Tony Blair, Johnny Vaughan, Number Six (Patrick McGoohan), Eddie Grundy (Trevor Harrison), Joe Grundy/Number Two (Edward Kelsey), Jack Woolley (Arnold Peters), Clarrie Grundy (Heather Bell), Ruth Archer/Number One (Felicity Finch), Eminem, Shaggy, Robin Cook, Charlotte Green, Martin Jarvis, Des Lynam, Terry Venables, Ally McCoist, George W. Bush, Dalek, Simon Cowell, Matt Smith, Anthony Hopkins, John Motson, Sven-Göran Eriksson, Graham Norton, Judi Dench, Trevor McDonald, John Sergeant, Marge Simpson, John Simpson, Homer Simpson, Bart Simpson, Brian Perkins, Sue Lawley, William Hague, Elton John. Programmes parodied: Moviewatch, The Prisoner, The Archers, The Premiership, Go4It, BBC 2002 FIFA World Cup qualification coverage, 100 Greatest, Afternoon Play, ITV News at Ten, The Simpsons, Desert Island Discs.
| 28 | 2 | "Episode 2" | Tom Jamieson & Nev Fountain, Jon Holmes, Laurence Howarth, Jon Culshaw and Tony Roche | 14 December 2001 |
Celebrities impersonated: Tony Blair, George W. Bush, Ernst Stavro Blofeld, James Bond (Pierce Brosnan), Charlotte Green, Matt Smith, Tom Baker, David Attenborough, Sara Cox, Hyacinth Bucket (Patricia Routledge), Fourth Doctor (Tom Baker), Nick Ross, Cliff Adams Singers, Shaggy, Eminem, Catherine Gee, Joe Grundy (Edward Kelsey), Pat Butcher (Pam St. Clement), John Motson, Sven-Göran Eriksson, William Hague, John Peel, Anne Robinson, Laura Jesson (Celia Johnson), Lynda Snell (Carole Boyd), Sue MacGregor, David Beckham, Alex Ferguson, Gérard Houllier, Ellen MacArthur, Ruth Archer (Felicity Finch). Programmes parodied: James Bond, Go4It, The Blue Planet, The Radio 1 Breakfast Show, Crimewatch, Sing Something Simple, Farmer Wants a Wife, Match of the Day, Desert Island Discs, The Weakest Link, Brief Encounter, Today, BBC Sports Personality of the Year 2001.
| 29 | 3 | "Episode 3" | Tom Jamieson & Nev Fountain, Jon Holmes, Laurence Howarth, Jon Culshaw, Tony Roche, Danny Robins & Dan Tetsell, Dave Cohen and Paul McKenzie | 21 December 2001 |
Celebrities impersonated: George W. Bush, John Prescott (as Father Christmas), Charlotte Green, Emily Buchanan, Ned Sherrin, John Humphrys, Sue MacGregor, Rabbi Lionel Blue, Jack Woolley (Arnold Peters), Joe Grundy (Edward Kelsey), Hyacinth Bucket (Patricia Routledge), Richard Whiteley, Matt Smith, Will Self, Julian Clary, Alan Bennett, Rolf Harris, Ruth Archer (Felicity Finch), Fourth Doctor (Tom Baker), Joe Grundy (Edward Kelsey), Robin Cook, Jimmy Savile, Michael Buerk, Michael Berkeley (as Ebenezer Scrooge), Bob Cratchit, Brian Perkins, Darth Vader (James Earl Jones), Thora Hird, Trevor McDonald, John Sergeant, Tony Blair, Greg Dyke (as Michael Caine), Barbara Windsor, Lily Savage (Paul O'Grady), Cookie Monster, Count von Count, Katie Price, David Beckham, Rev. Ian Paisley, Robin Cook, Dale Winton, David Bowie, Chris Tarrant, Robbie Williams, Anne Robinson. Programmes parodied: A World in Your Ear, Loose Ends, Today, Thought for the Day, The Archers, Countdown, Go4It, Christmas in Three Words, The Lord of the Rings, BBC Radio 3, ITV News at Ten, Woman's Hour, Letter from America, Brain of Britain, Thinking Allowed, Book at Bedtime, Feedback, Who Wants to Be a Millionaire?
| 30 | 4 | "Episode 4" | Tom Jamieson & Nev Fountain, Jon Holmes, Laurence Howarth, Jon Culshaw, Tony Roche, Danny Robins & Dan Tetsell, Dave Cohen and Paul McKenzie | 4 January 2002 |
Celebrities impersonated: Charlotte Green, Nick Ross, Dr. David Starkey, Catherine Gee, Brian Aldridge (Charles Collingwood), Jack Woolley (Arnold Peters), Siobhan Hathaway (Caroline Lennon), Joe Grundy (Edward Kelsey), Ruth Archer (Felicity Finch), John Peel, Cliff Adams Singers, Mick Jagger, Trevor McDonald, Big Brother narrator (Marcus Bentley), Captain Kirk (William Shatner), Mr. Scott (James Doohan), Craig Phillips, Fergal Keane, Alan Bennett, Muriel Gray, Charles Kennedy, Darth Vader (James Earl Jones), Del Boy (David Jason), Rodney Trotter (Nicholas Lyndhurst), Carol Smillie, Linda Barker, Richard Wilson, Johnny Vaughan, Libby Purves, Jenni Murray, Michael Buerk, Jo Brand, Kate Adie, Professor Sam Ryan/Peter Pan (Amanda Burton), John Savident (as Captain Hook), Frank Bruno (as Tinker Bell). Programmes parodied: Crimewatch, The Six Wives of Henry VIII, Farmer Wants a Wife, The Archers, Sing Something Simple, ITV News at Ten, Big Brother, Star Trek: Enterprise, Start the Week, Only Fools and Horses, Changing Rooms, Midweek, Woman's Hour, Peter Pan (pantomime).
| 31 | 5 | "Episode 5" | Tom Jamieson & Nev Fountain, Jon Holmes, Laurence Howarth, Jon Culshaw, Tony Roche, Danny Robins & Dan Tetsell, Dave Cohen and Paul McKenzie | 11 January 2002 |
Celebrities impersonated: Tony Blair, Michael Buerk, Thora Hird, Hyacinth Bucket (Patricia Routledge), John Motson, Sven-Göran Eriksson, Jonathan Ross, James Bond (Pierce Brosnan), Thora Hird (as Q), Sean Connery, Roger Moore, Anne Robinson, Chris Tarrant, Ruby Wax, Robert Kilroy-Silk, Bruce Forsyth, Richard Whiteley, Trevor McDonald, John Sergeant, Robin Cook, Nick Ross, Cliff Adams Singers, Jenni Murray, Zippy (as Cherie Blair), George, Robin Cook (as Bill & Ben), Johnny Vegas, Nancy Dell'Olio, George W. Bush, Fourth Doctor (Tom Baker). Programmes parodied: 999, Match of the Day, Film..., James Bond, The Weakest Link, Who Wants to Be a Millionaire?, ITV News at Ten, Crimewatch, Sing Something Simple, Woman's Hour, Faking It.

=== Series 7 (2002) ===
The seventh series starred Jon Culshaw, Jan Ravens, Mark Perry, Kevin Connelly, Phil Cornwell (episode 3) and Stefano Paolini (episode 4). The producers were Mario Stylianides (episodes 1–3) and Bill Dare (episode 4). On episodes 1–3 Bill Dare was credited as the programmes deviser.

| No. overall | No. in series | Title | Written by | Original release date |
|---|---|---|---|---|
| 32 | 1 | "Episode 1" | Tom Jamieson & Nev Fountain, Jon Holmes, Laurence Howarth, Jon Culshaw, Colin Birch and Dave Cohen | 19 April 2002 |
Celebrities impersonated: John Humphrys, Jonathan Ross, Russell Crowe (as George W. Bush), Barbara Bush, George H. W. Bush, Kevin Spacey (as Dick Cheney), Eddie Murphy (as Colin Powell), Ian McKellen (as Tony Blair), Charlotte Green, Siobhán Hathaway (Caroline Lennon), Brian Aldridge (Charles Collingwood), Martin Jarvis (as unborn baby Rúairi Donovan), Kirsty Wark, Dale Winton, Barbara Windsor, Graham Norton, Wilfred Owen, Nick Ross, Hyacinth Bucket (Patricia Routledge), Fourth Doctor (Tom Baker), David Dickinson, Johnny Vegas, Brian Perkins, Matt Smith, Michael Buerk, God (as Brian Blessed), Robin Cook, Ben Elton, Dr. David Starkey, Brian Sewell, Emily Buchanan, Eddie Grundy (Trevor Harrison), Clarrie Grundy (Heather Bell), Joe Grundy (Edward Kelsey), Ruth Archer (Felicity Finch), Eddie Murphy (as Jack Woolley), Eminem (as Bert Fry), Charlie Slater (Derek Martin), Little Mo Slater (Kacey Ainsworth), Trevor Morgan (Alex Ferns), Big Mo Harris (Laila Morse), Peggy Mitchell (Barbara Windsor), George W. Bush, Judi Dench, Cliff Adams Singers, Black and White Minstrels. Programmes parodied: BBC coverage of Funeral of Queen Elizabeth The Queen Mother, Film..., A Beautiful Mind, The Archers, The Trench, Crimewatch, Bargain Hunt, Go4It, BBC Ten O'Clock News, A World in Your Ear, EastEnders, Radio 4 Appeal, Sing Something Simple, The Black and White Minstrel Show.
| 33 | 2 | "Episode 2" | Tom Jamieson & Nev Fountain, Laurence Howarth, Jon Culshaw, Colin Birch, Ashley Blaker and Tony Roche | 26 April 2002 |
Celebrities impersonated: Charlotte Green, Brian Aldridge (Charles Collingwood), Siobhán Hathaway (Caroline Lennon), Sven-Göran Eriksson, Chris Tarrant, Michael Buerk, Rolf Harris, Tony Blair, John Humphrys, Jim Naughtie, Sarah Montague, Ernst Stavro Blofeld, James Bond (Pierce Brosnan), Kirsty Wark, David Dickinson, Michael Berkeley, Anne Robinson, Liz Barclay, Nigella Lawson, John Waite, Nancy Dell'Olio, Fourth Doctor (Tom Baker), Martin Jarvis, Melvyn Bragg, William Shakespeare (as Graham Norton), Germaine Greer, Henry Wriothesley, 3rd Earl of Southampton (as Dame Edna Everage), Matthew Kelly, Osama bin Laden, George W. Bush, Obi-Wan Kenobi (Alec Guinness), Professor Sam Ryan (Amanda Burton), John Motson, Bobby Robson, Kevin Keegan, Alex Ferguson, George, Zippy. Programmes parodied: The Archers, Tarrant on TV, 999, Animal Hospital, Today, James Bond, Newsnight, BBC 6 Music, You and Yours, In Our Time, After They Were Famous, BBC Ten O'Clock News, Rainbow.
| 34 | 3 | "Episode 3" | Tom Jamieson & Nev Fountain, Jon Holmes, Laurence Howarth, Jon Culshaw, Paul Ebbs and Stuart Robinson | 3 May 2002 |
Celebrities impersonated: George W. Bush, Bob Ferris (Rodney Bewes), Terry Collier (James Bolam), Nick Ross, Matt Smith, Judi Dench, Maximus Decimus Meridius (Russell Crowe), Brian Perkins, Mark "Rent Boy" Renton (Ewan McGregor), Greg Dyke (as Michael Caine), Michael Buerk, Dale Winton, Graham Norton, Barbara Windsor, Johnny Vegas, Jack Nicholson, Martin Jarvis, Shaggy Rogers, Velma Dinkley, Scooby-Doo, Officer Charlie Dibble, Top Cat, Porky Pig, Sarah Montague, Charles Kennedy, Trevor McDonald, Irene Forsyte (Gina McKee), Philip Bosinney/Leonard Jeffery "Oz" Osborne (Jimmy Nail), Soames Forsyte/Dennis L. Patterson (Tim Healy), Thora Hird, Rolf Harris, Fourth Doctor (Tom Baker), Mark Lawson, Lily Savage (Paul O'Grady), Harold Steptoe (Harry H. Corbett), David Dimbleby, Kirsty Wark, Hyacinth Bucket (Patricia Routledge). Programmes parodied: UK Gold, Whatever Happened to the Likely Lads?, Crimewatch, Go4It, Trainspotting, BBC Ten O'Clock News, BBC 2002 local elections coverage, Scooby-Doo, Top Cat, Looney Tunes, Today, ITV News at Ten, The Forsyte Saga, Auf Wiedersehen, Pet, Front Row.
| 35 | 4 | "Episode 4" | Tom Jamieson & Nev Fountain, Jon Holmes, Laurence Howarth, Jon Culshaw, Colin Birch, Ashley Blaker and Tony Roche | 10 May 2002 |
Celebrities impersonated: John Motson, Sven-Göran Eriksson, Les Dawson, Iain Duncan Smith, Thora Hird, Hyacinth Bucket (Patricia Routledge), Carol Smillie, Linda Barker, Kirsty Wark, Tony Blair, John Prescott, Robin Cook, Donal MacIntyre (as Ruth Archer), Lynda Snell (Carole Boyd), Clarrie Grundy (Heather Bell), Joe Grundy (Edward Kelsey), Siobhán Hathaway (Caroline Lennon), Brian Aldridge (Charles Collingwood), Ruth Archer (Felicity Finch), Obi-Wan Kenobi (Alec Guinness), Charlotte Green, Peggy Mitchell (Barbara Windsor), Beppe di Marco (Michael Greco), Phil Mitchell (Steve McFadden), Cliff Adams Singers, Black and White Minstrels, David Dickinson, Mick Jagger, Master Yoda (Frank Oz), Brian Perkins, Big Brother narrator (Marcus Bentley), Homer Simpson, Marge Simpson, Grampa Simpson, Lisa Simpson, Bart Simpson, Mr. Burns, Waylon Smithers, Moe Szyslak, Brian Blessed, Jonathan Ross, Darth Vader (James Earl Jones), Leonard "Oz" Osborne (Jimmy Nail), Neville Hope (Kevin Whately), Dennis L. Patterson (Tim Healy), Brian Sewell, John Humphrys, Sarah Montague, Rabbi Lionel Blue, Patrick Moore, Arnold Schwarzenegger (as Dennis the Menace), Eddie Murphy (as Gnasher), Russell Crowe (as Maximus Decimus Meridius/Dennis's Dad), Judi Dench (as Minnie the Minx). Programmes parodied: Bad Girls, Changing Rooms, Newsnight, MacIntyre Investigates, The Archers, EastEnders, Sing Something Simple, The Black and White Minstrel Show, Bargain Hunt, Big Brother, The Simpsons, Radio 4 Appeal, Film..., Star Wars, Auf Wiedersehen, Pet, Today, Thought for the Day, The Sky at Night, Dennis the Menace, Match of the Day.

=== Special (2002) ===
This special marked the Golden Jubilee of Elizabeth II.

| No. overall | No. in series | Title | Written by | Original release date |
|---|---|---|---|---|
| 36 | – | "Golden Jubilee Special" | Unknown | 4 June 2002 |

=== Series 8 (2002) ===
The eighth series starred Jon Culshaw, Jan Ravens, Mark Perry, Phil Cornwell (episodes 2–4) and Brian Bowles (episode 1). The producer was Bill Dare. Episodes 1 and 2 were recorded at the Edinburgh Festival Fringe.

| No. overall | No. in series | Title | Written by | Original release date |
|---|---|---|---|---|
| 37 | 1 | "Episode 1" | Tom Jamieson & Nev Fountain, Laurence Howarth, Steve Punt, Chris Thompson & Peter Reynolds and Jon Holmes | 16 August 2002 |
Celebrities impersonated: Brian Perkins, Kirsty Wark, Des Lynam, Anne Robinson, The Weakest Link narrator (Jon Briggs), Alan Titchmarsh, Diarmuid Gavin, Trevor McDonald, George W. Bush, Jade Goody, Steve Irwin, John Prescott, Ken Livingstone, Jonathan Ross, Johnny Vegas, Victor Drazen (Dennis Hopper), Fourth Doctor (Tom Baker), Alvin Hall, Bill Gates, Lowri Turner, Osama bin Laden, Tracey Cox, Jeremy Milnes, Charlotte Green, Judi Dench, Richard Briers, Martin Jarvis, John Humphrys, Hyacinth Bucket (Patricia Routledge), Tony Blair, Harold Pinter, Daphne Moon (Jane Leeves), Niles Crane (David Hyde Pierce), Bob "Bulldog" Briscoe (Dan Butler), Private Frazer (John Laurie), Jay Hunt, Andrew Neil, George Entwistle, Brian Sewell (as Shaggy). Programmes parodied: Newsnight, The Weakest Link specials, Gardeners' World, Homefront, ITV News, The Crocodile Hunter Diaries, Film..., 24, Your Money or Your Life, Would Like to Meet, The Archers, Two Pints of Lager and a Packet of Crisps, Today, Thought for the Day, Frasier, Dad's Army.
| 38 | 2 | "Episode 2" | Tom Jamieson & Nev Fountain, Jon Holmes, Peter Reynolds, Chris Thompson, Laurence Howarth, Jon Culshaw and Tony Roche | 23 August 2002 |
Celebrities impersonated: Tony Blair, Ned Sherrin, Sandi Toksvig, Judi Dench, Martin Jarvis, Greg Dyke (as Michael Caine), Lowri Turner, Jay Hunt, Joseph Merrick The Elephant Man, Jeremy Milnes, Tracey Cox, Jonathan Ross, Russell Crowe (as Maximus Decimus Meridius/Rolf Harris), Eddie Murphy (as Tony), Marlon Brando (as Charley the Cat), Arnold Schwarzenegger (as Green Cross Man), Brian Sewell (as Shaggy/Reel 2 Real), Kirsty Wark, Alvin Hall, Charlotte Green, Stephen Hopkins, Senator David Palmer (Dennis Haysbert), Jack Bauer (Kiefer Sutherland), Hannah Gordon, Vincent van Gogh, Patrick Moore, Robert De Niro (as little boy), Jack Nicholson (as little boy who gets electrocuted), Mark Lawson, Tom Paulin, Germaine Greer, Tony Parsons, John Humphrys. Programmes parodied: Edinburgh Festival Fringe, The News Quiz, Afternoon Play, Would Like to Meet, Film..., Public information films – Learn to Swim, Charley Says: Matches, Green Cross Code, Your Money or Your Life, 24, Watercolour Challenge, Public information films – Play Safe: Electrical Sub-Station, Late Review, Today.
| 39 | 3 | "Episode 3" | Nev Fountain & Tom Jamieson, Jon Holmes, Laurence Howarth, Tony Roche, Jon Culshaw and Richard Ward | 30 August 2002 |
Celebrities impersonated: George W. Bush, Charlotte Green, Alan Rickman (as Hans Gruber/Sheriff of Nottingham/Severus Snape), Judi Dench (as Iris Murdoch), Jonathan Ross, Charlie Croker (Michael Caine), Alvin Hall, Michael Buerk, David Dickinson, John Humphrys, Melvyn Bragg (as Tim Westwood), Greg Dyke (as Michael Caine), Steve Irwin, Christine Hamilton, Uri Geller, Nigel Benn, Chris Eubank, Rhona Cameron, Tony Blackburn, Tara Palmer-Tomkinson, Michael Berkeley, Lowri Turner, Anne Robinson, Tracey Cox, Michael Parkinson, Mrs. Robinson (Anne Bancroft), Benjamin Braddock (Dustin Hoffman), Eddie Murphy (as Tony), Marlon Brando (as Charley the Cat), Brian Perkins, Brian Sewell, Doris Lessing, Melvyn Bragg, Darth Vader (James Earl Jones/David Prowse), Darth Vader (as Pam Ayres/The Wurzels/Joe Grundy), Jeremy Milnes, Kirsty Young, Kate Adie, Clarrie Grundy (Heather Bell). Programmes parodied: Die Hard, Robin Hood: Prince of Thieves, Harry Potter and the Philosopher's Stone, Iris, Film..., The Italian Job, BBC Ten O'Clock News, Bargain Hunt, Today, Voices of the Powerless, Go4It, The Crocodile Hunter Diaries, I'm a Celebrity...Get Me Out of Here!, BBC Radio 3, Would Like to Meet, The Weakest Link, Parkinson, Public information films – Charley Says, The Graduate, BBC Four, The Generation Game, The South Bank Show, Star Wars, BBC News, Channel 5 adult entertainment, The Archers.
| 40 | 4 | "Episode 4" | Tom Jamieson & Nev Fountain, Jon Holmes, Laurence Howarth, Tony Roche, Simon Blackwell, Jon Culshaw and Richard Ward | 6 September 2002 |
Celebrities impersonated: Tony Blair, Jonathan Ross, Arnold Schwarzenegger, Ian McKellen, Alan Rickman, Brian Blessed, Greg Dyke (as Michael Caine), George W. Bush, Sharon Watts (Letitia Dean), Peggy Mitchell (Barbara Windsor), Eminem, Judi Dench, Liz Hurley, Maximus Decimus Meridius (Russell Crowe), Fourth Doctor/Dr. Anthony Trueman (Tom Baker), Brian Sewell, A. S. Byatt, Trevor McDonald, Thora Hird, My Worst Week narrator (Iain Lee), John Sergeant, Robin Cook, Eddie Murphy (as Tony), Marlon Brando (as Charley the Cat), Charlotte Green, John Humphrys, Shaggy, Liz Barclay, John Waite, Clarrie Grundy (Heather Bell), Eddie Grundy (Trevor Harrison), Joe Grundy (Edward Kelsey), Nigella Lawson, Sven-Göran Eriksson, Chris Tarrant, Hannah Gordon, Jonathan Dimbleby, Mohamed Al-Fayed, Alan Bennett. Programmes parodied: Film..., Generic Arnold Schwarzenegger films, EastEnders, BBC Four, Bullseye, ITV News at Ten, My Worst Week, Public information films, Today, You and Yours, The Archers, Forever Summer, Who Wants to Be a Millionaire?, Watercolour Challenge, BBC Newsflash.

=== Series 9 (2003) ===
The ninth series starred Jon Culshaw, Jan Ravens, Mark Perry, Kevin Connelly and Phil Cornwell. The programme was devised by Bill Dare and the producer was Katie Tyrrell.

| No. overall | No. in series | Title | Written by | Original release date |
|---|---|---|---|---|
| 41 | 1 | "Episode 1" | Tom Jamieson & Nev Fountain, Jon Holmes, Laurence Howarth, Henry Naylor, Gerard Foster, Colin Birch and Paul Kerensa | 10 January 2003 |
Celebrities impersonated: Charlotte Green, Tony Blair, Henry Blofeld, Clarrie Grundy (Heather Bell), Joe Grundy (Edward Kelsey), Ruth Archer (Felicity Finch), Ian McKellen (as Brian Aldridge), Alan Rickman (as Brian Aldridge), Brian Blessed (as Brian Aldridge), Brian Perkins, George W. Bush, Trevor McDonald, Michael Buerk, Greg Dyke (as Michael Caine), Jonathan Dimbleby, Rolf Harris, Nick Ross, Peggy Mitchell (Barbara Windsor), Pat Butcher (Pam St. Clement), Little Mo Slater (Kacey Ainsworth), Kat Slater (Jessie Wallace), Eminem, Thora Hird, Alistair Cooke, Jonathan Ross, Harry Potter (Daniel Radcliffe), Rolf Harris (as Professor Dumbledore), Billy Connolly (as Professor Dumbledore), Brian Blessed (as Professor Dumbledore), Brian Perkins (as Professor Dumbledore), John Peel, Melvyn Bragg, Tracey Emin, Rupert Rigsby (Leonard Rossiter), Brian Sewell, Martin Jarvis, Ozzy Osbourne, Nigella Lawson, Frodo Baggins (Elijah Wood), Gandalf (Ian McKellen). Programmes parodied: Test Match Special, The Archers, BBC Digital Radio Stations advert, ITV News at Ten, Blind Date, The Choice, Any Questions?, Crimewatch, EastEnders, Letter from America, Film..., Harry Potter, The South Bank Show, Rising Damp, Go4It, Book at Bedtime, Dracula, The Lord of the Rings.
| 42 | 2 | "Episode 2" | Tom Jamieson & Nev Fountain, Jon Holmes, Laurence Howarth, Henry Naylor, Rhodri Crooks and Colin Birch | 17 January 2003 |
Celebrities impersonated: Tony Blair, John Humphrys, Sarah Montague, Jim Naughtie, Robin Cook, Frodo Baggins (Elijah Wood), Gandalf (Ian McKellen), Michael Buerk, Ted Heath, Jimmy Savile, George W. Bush, Ian McKellen (as Saddam Hussein), Alan Rickman (as Osama bin Laden), Brian Blessed (as Fidel Castro), Charlotte Green, Alistair Cooke, Trevor McDonald, Charles, Prince of Wales, Rolf Harris, Henry Blofeld, Fred Trueman, Michael Berkeley, David Dimbleby, Brian Sewell, Brian Perkins, Clarrie Grundy (Heather Bell), Eddie Grundy (Trevor Harrison), Lynda Snell (Carole Boyd), Kat Slater (Jessie Wallace), Big Mo Harris (Laila Morse), Lynne Hobbs (Elaine Lordan), Joe Grundy (Edward Kelsey), Greg Dyke (as Michael Caine), Melvyn Bragg, Ozzy Osbourne, Alison Mitchell, Andrew Marr, Barry Cryer, Ned Sherrin, Alan Bennett. Programmes parodied: Today, The Lord of the Rings, BBC Ten O'Clock News, Letter from America, ITV News, Animal Hospital, Test Match Special, BBC Radio 3, BBC Royal Funerals coverage, Radio 4 News Bulletin, The Archers, EastEnders, The Routes of English, The Osbournes, Holby City, Money Box, I'm Sorry I Haven't a Clue, Counterpoint.
| 43 | 3 | "Episode 3" | Tom Jamieson & Nev Fountain, Jon Holmes, Laurence Howarth, Jon Culshaw, Rhodri Crooks and Paul Kerensa | 24 January 2003 |
Celebrities impersonated: George W. Bush, Trevor McDonald, Michael Owen, Shaggy Rogers, Scooby-Doo, Velma Dinkley, Ken Livingstone, Tony Blair, Sven-Göran Eriksson, David Beckham, Kirsty Wark, Darth Vader (James Earl Jones), Fred Trueman, Henry Blofeld, Master Yoda (Frank Oz), Clarrie Grundy (Heather Bell), Eddie Grundy (Trevor Harrison), Frodo Baggins (Elijah Wood), David Dickinson (as Gandalf), John Humphrys, Kat Slater (Jessie Wallace), Dr. Simon Schama, Joe Grundy (Edward Kelsey), Cherie Blair, Lynda Snell (Carole Boyd), Greg Dyke (as Michael Caine), Huw Edwards, Andrew Marr, Charlotte Green, Judi Dench, Martin Jarvis (as Wally), Mark Lawson, Robert De Niro (as What Not to Wear contestant), Jack Nicholson (as Trinny Woodall & Susannah Constantine), Ozzy Osbourne, Jonathan Ross, The Terminator (Arnold Schwarzenegger), Anne Robinson, Anthony Hopkins, William Shatner (as Captain Kirk), Marlon Brando, Robin Cook. Programmes parodied: ITV News at Ten, National Lottery adverts, Scooby-Doo, Newsnight, Star Wars, Test Match Special, Wife Swap, The Archers, The Lord of the Rings, Bargain Hunt, Today, EastEnders, BBC Ten O'Clock News, Afternoon Play, Where's Wally?, Newsnight Review, What Not to Wear, Dogs Playing Poker, Film..., Terminator 3: Rise of the Machines, The Weakest Link specials, Number 1, 1948 by Jackson Pollock.
| 44 | 4 | "Episode 4" | Tom Jamieson & Nev Fountain, Jon Holmes, Laurence Howarth, Jon Culshaw, Rhodri Crooks, Simon Blackwell, Colin Birch and Richard Ward | 31 January 2003 |
Celebrities impersonated: Frodo Baggins (Elijah Wood), Gandalf (Ian McKellen), Ken Livingstone, Barry Davies, Brendan Foster, Clare Balding, John Motson, Kirsty Wark, Iain Duncan Smith, Yogi Bear, Boo-Boo Bear, Road Runner, Ann Widdecombe, Johnny Knoxville, George W. Bush, Tony Blair, Greg Dyke (as Michael Caine), Charlotte Green, Eddie Grundy (Trevor Harrison), Clarrie Grundy (Heather Bell), Ozzy Osbourne, Jack Woolley (Arnold Peters), Lynda Snell (Carole Boyd), Joe Grundy (Edward Kelsey), Ashley Peacock (Steven Arnold), Brian Perkins, John Waite, Liz Barclay, Dr. Simon Schama, Kat Slater (Jessie Wallace), Lynne Hobbs/Catherine of Aragon (Elaine Lordan), Dr. David Starkey, Ned Sherrin, Martin Jarvis, Judi Dench, Jonathan Ross, John Humphrys, Jim Naughtie, Rabbi Lionel Blue, Sandi Toksvig, Brian Sewell, Dale Winton, Fourth Doctor (Tom Baker), Third Doctor (Jon Pertwee), Michael Buerk, Fergal Keane, Trevor McDonald, Thora Hird. Programmes parodied: The Lord of the Rings, London bid for the 2012 Summer Olympics, Newsnight, Nickelodeon channel, The Yogi Bear Show, Looney Tunes, Jackass, The Archers, Coronation Street, Radio 4 News Bulletin, You and Yours, A History of Britain, EastEnders, Loose Ends, Afternoon Play, Radio 4 comedies, Film..., Gangs of New York, Today, Thought for the Day, Excess Baggage, The Choice, On the Ropes, Taking a Stand, ITV News, Blind Date, Stars in Their Eyes, Pop Idol.

=== Series 10 (2003) ===
The tenth series starred Jon Culshaw, Jan Ravens, Mark Perry, Phil Cornwell and Kevin Connelly (except episode 3). The programme was devised by Bill Dare and the producer was Mario Stylianides. Episode 5 was entitled the 50th edition of Dead Ringers, however this was inaccurate because the fourth episode of Series 5 never aired, meaning this was the 49th episode overall.

| No. overall | No. in series | Title | Written by | Original release date |
|---|---|---|---|---|
| 45 | 1 | "Episode 1" | Tom Jamieson & Nev Fountain, Laurence Howarth, Jon Culshaw, Colin Birch, Richard Ward, Carl Thing and Tony Cooke | 5 September 2003 |
Celebrities impersonated: Saddam Hussein, Charlotte Green, Martin Jarvis, Patrick Moore, Chris Eubank, Ozzy Osbourne, Judi Dench, Stelios Haji-Ioannou, Brian Perkins, Tony Blair, John Humphrys, Ernst Stavro Blofeld, James Bond (Pierce Brosnan), Kirsty Wark, Shaggy (as Geoff Hoon), Alistair Cooke, Kirstie Allsopp, Phil Spencer, Mr. Magoo (as Geoff Hoon), Mark Lawson, Gary Lineker, Alan Hansen, Mark Lawrenson, Trevor Brooking, John Motson, Jack Bauer (Kiefer Sutherland), D.I. Jack Frost (David Jason), Greg Dyke (as Michael Caine), Helen Mark, Richard Uridge. Programmes parodied: Saddam Hussein's post war terror messages, The Sky at Night, At Home with the Eubanks, Radio 4 Appeal, Radio 4 Six O'Clock News, Mastermind, James Bond, Newsnight, Letter from America, Location, Location, Location, Front Row, Match of the Day, 24, A Touch of Frost, Open Country.
| 46 | 2 | "Episode 2" | Tom Jamieson & Nev Fountain, Laurence Howarth, Jon Holmes, Jon Culshaw, Colin Birch, Richard Ward, Carl Carter and Tony Cooke | 12 September 2003 |
Celebrities impersonated: Brian Perkins, Charlotte Green, Eddie Grundy (Trevor Harrison), Clarrie Grundy (Heather Bell), Joe Grundy (Edward Kelsey), Ed Grundy/Hayley Jordan (as Kevin the Teenager), Lynda Snell (Carole Boyd), Marjorie Antrobus (Margot Boyd), Mark Lawson, Richard Wilson, Fay Ripley, George W. Bush, Leonard "Oz" Osborne (Jimmy Nail), Neville Hope (Kevin Whately), D.I. John Rebus (Ken Stott), Rosemary Boxer (Felicity Kendal), D.I. Jack Frost (David Jason), Michael Berkeley, Delia Smith, David Blaine, Fourth Doctor (Tom Baker), Sandi Toksvig, Tom Paulin, Brian Sewell, Melvyn Bragg, Sophie Raworth, Johnny Vegas, Alistair Cooke, Nigella Lawson, John Humphrys, Clare Short, John Motson, Sven-Göran Eriksson, Chris Eubank, Ozzy Osbourne, Sharon Osbourne. Programmes parodied: The Archers, Front Row, The Canterbury Tales, Auf Wiedersehen, Pet, Rebus, Rosemary & Thyme, A Touch of Frost, BBC Radio 3, Delia's How to Cook, Excess Baggage, BBC Six O'Clock News, Letter from America, Nigella Bites, Today, Match of the Day.
| 47 | 3 | "Episode 3" | Tom Jamieson & Nev Fountain, Laurence Howarth, Jon Holmes, Jon Culshaw, Carl Carter & Tony Cooke, Paul Gannon and John Finnemore | 19 September 2003 |
Celebrities impersonated: Tony Blair, Sophie Raworth, Kirsty Wark, Robin Cook, Swedish Chef, Greg Dyke (as Michael Caine), Charlotte Green, Martin Jarvis, Judi Dench, Donald Sinden, Chris Eubank, Thora Hird, Brian Perkins, Dale Winton, Barbara Windsor, John Humphrys, Clare Short, David Blunkett, Graham Norton, Stelios Haji-Ioannou, Hannibal Lecter (Anthony Hopkins), Clarice Starling (Jodie Foster), Ozzy Osbourne, Kirstie Allsopp, Phil Spencer, David Blaine, Brian Sewell, Jonathan Ross, Gandalf (Ian McKellen), Frodo Baggins (Elijah Wood), Mick Jagger, Bob Geldof, John Peel, David Beckham. Programmes parodied: BBC Six O'Clock News, Newsnight, The Crouches, Today, Showbiz Pals, Thought for the Day, The Silence of the Lambs, Listen with Mother, The Frog Prince, Location, Location, Location, 2003 Booker Prize shortlist announcement, Film..., The Lord of the Rings, Shipping Forecast, Live Aid appeal film, Home Truths.
| 48 | 4 | "Episode 4" | Tom Jamieson & Nev Fountain, Laurence Howarth, Jon Holmes, Jon Culshaw, Colin Birch and Richard Ward | 26 September 2003 |
Celebrities impersonated: Tony Blair, Ozzy Osbourne, Greg Dyke (as Michael Caine), Liz Barclay, John Waite, Den Watts (Leslie Grantham), George W. Bush, Charlotte Green, Clarrie Grundy (Heather Bell), Joe Grundy (Edward Kelsey), Michael Berkeley, John Humphrys, David Blunkett, Trevor McDonald, Jack Duckworth (Bill Tarmey), Fred Elliott (John Savident), Ashley Peacock (Steven Arnold), Brian Perkins, Patrick Moore, Fourth Doctor (Tom Baker), Dalek, Linda Barker, Eddie Grundy (Trevor Harrison), Walter Gabriel (Chris Gittins). Programmes parodied: You and Yours, The Archers, BBC Radio 3, Today, Quote... Unquote, ITV News at Ten, Coronation Street, Shipping Forecast, Doctor Who, Changing Rooms.
| 49 | 5 | "Episode 5" | Tom Jamieson & Nev Fountain, Jon Holmes, Laurence Howarth, Jon Culshaw, Ali Crockatt and David Scott | 3 October 2003 |
Celebrities impersonated: Tony Blair, Pat Butcher (Pam St. Clement), Kat Slater (Jessie Wallace), Brian Perkins, Greg Dyke (as Michael Caine), Mark Lawson, Fourth Doctor (Tom Baker), Dalek, Anne Robinson, The Weakest Link narrator (Jon Briggs), Cyberman, Liz Barclay, John Waite, Clare Short, Ken Livingstone, Robin Cook, Rolf Harris, Charlotte Green, Martin Jarvis, Judi Dench, Brian Blessed, Ozzy Osbourne, Brian Sewell, Grant Mitchell (Ross Kemp), Sharon Watts (Letitia Dean), Den Watts (Leslie Grantham), Peggy Mitchell (Barbara Windsor), Lou Beale (Anna Wing), David Dimbleby, Gordon Brown, Clarrie Grundy (Heather Bell), Eddie Grundy (Trevor Harrison), Brian Aldridge (Charles Collingwood), Ruth Archer (Felicity Finch), Siobhán Hathaway (Caroline Lennon), Alan Bennett. Programmes parodied: EastEnders, Newsnight Review, The Weakest Link, You and Yours, Animal Hospital, Family, The Archers.

=== Special (2004) ===
Recorded in The Pleasance theatre at the Edinburgh Festival Fringe.

| No. overall | No. in series | Title | Written by | Original release date |
|---|---|---|---|---|
| 50 | – | "August Bank Holiday Special" | Unknown | 30 August 2004 |

=== Series 11 (2005) ===
For this series the show went on tour around England & Wales recording at Assembly Hall Theatre, Tunbridge Wells, Warwick Arts Centre, New Theatre, Cardiff, Hull City Hall, The Anvil, Basingstoke and The Rex, Berkhamsted.

| No. overall | No. in series | Title | Written by | Original release date |
|---|---|---|---|---|
| 51 | 1 | "Episode 1" | Unknown | 16 September 2005 |
| 52 | 2 | "Episode 2" | Unknown | 23 September 2005 |
| 53 | 3 | "Episode 3" | Unknown | 30 September 2005 |
| 54 | 4 | "Episode 4" | Unknown | 7 October 2005 |
| 55 | 5 | "Episode 5" | Unknown | 14 October 2005 |
| 56 | 6 | "Episode 6" | Unknown | 21 October 2005 |

=== Special (2007) ===
The special marked the end of Tony Blair's premiership after ten years. It was commissioned after he announced his resignation on 10 May 2007 and aired five days later. The special was also the final episode of Dead Ringers for seven years, until it returned in 2014.

| No. overall | No. in series | Title | Written by | Original release date |
|---|---|---|---|---|
| 57 | – | "Tony Blair Special" | Unknown | 15 May 2007 |

=== Series 12 (2014) ===
After a seven-year break Dead Ringers returned to Radio 4 for a twelfth series. Jon Culshaw and Jan Ravens returned joined by Debra Stephenson (except episode 5), Duncan Wisbey and Lewis MacLeod. Jan Ravens did not appear in episodes 3–4. Bill Dare returned as the programmes producer.

| No. overall | No. in series | Title | Written by | Original release date |
|---|---|---|---|---|
| 58 | 1 | "Episode 1" | Tom Jamieson & Nev Fountain, Ed Amsden, Jack Bernhardt, Tom Coles, Jon Culshaw, Bill Dare, Laurence Howarth and Gráinne Maguire | 30 July 2014 |
Celebrities impersonated: Neil Nunes, John Humphrys, Jim Naughtie, Garry Richardson, Ed Miliband, William Hague, Brendan Foster, Michael Johnson, Gabby Logan, Clare Balding, Hazel Irvine, Victoria Wood, Eric Robson, Bunny Guinness, Nigel Farage, Brian Cox, Michael Portillo, Diane Abbott, Andrew Neil, Robert Crawley (Hugh Bonneville), Cora Crawley (Elizabeth McGovern), Isobel Crawley (Penelope Wilton), Dowager Countess of Grantham (Maggie Smith), Lady Mary Crawley (Michelle Dockery), Charles Carson (Jim Carter), Tom Branson (Allen Leech), Ray Winstone, Fiona Bruce, Idris Elba, Judi Dench, Ian McKellen, Patrick Stewart, Alan Bennett, Olivia Colman, Thora Hird, Brian Sewell, Nick Clegg, George Osborne, Esther McVey, Boris Johnson, Cheryl Cole. Programmes parodied: Today, BBC Commonwealth Games 2014 coverage, Gardeners' Question Time, Great British Railway Journeys, This Week, Downton Abbey, Made in Chelsea.
| 59 | 2 | "Episode 2" | Tom Jamieson & Nev Fountain, Ed Amsden, Jack Bernhardt, James Bugg, Sarah Campbell, Tom Coles, Jon Culshaw, Max Davis, Laurence Howarth, Gabby Hutchinson Crouch, Ben Partridge and Duncan Wisbey | 6 August 2014 |
Celebrities impersonated: John Humphrys, Jim Naughtie, Corrie Corfield, Sean Connery, George Galloway, Neil Nunes, Paul Lewis, Leslie Meadows, Tony Blair, Phil Mitchell (Steve McFadden), Sharon Watts (Letitia Dean), Mick Carter (Danny Dyer), David Mitchell, Victoria Coren Mitchell, Zane Lowe, Pete Doherty, Esther McVey, Dalek, Penelope Wilton, Gareth Malone, Ed Miliband, Barry White, Janet Street-Porter, Lauren Laverne, Mark Radcliffe, Boy George, John Lydon, Paul McCartney, Ozzy Osbourne, James Hetfield, Richard Osman, Mel Giedroyc, Sue Perkins, MasterChef narrator (India Fisher), Paul Hollywood, Mary Berry, Francine Stock, Nigel Farage, Ian McKellen. Programmes parodied: Today, Thought for the Day, Money Box Live, EastEnders, Zane Lowe Sessions, The Choir, Pointless, The Great British Bake Off, MasterChef, The Film Programme.
| 60 | 3 | "Episode 3" | Tom Jamieson & Nev Fountain, Ed Amsden, Tom Coles, Jon Culshaw, Laurence Howarth and Duncan Wisbey | 13 August 2014 |
Celebrities impersonated: Jim Naughtie, Evan Davis, William Hague, Tony Blair, Boris Johnson, David Cameron, Jeremy Paxman, Nigel Farage, Neil Nunes, David Attenborough, Sean Connery, Alex Salmond, Jools Holland, Guy Garvey, Michael Caine, Paul Hollywood, Cherie Lunghi, Ed Miliband, Bill & Ben, Weed, Dan Snow, Davina McCall, Ross Kemp, Eddie Izzard, Alan Bennett, Ian McKellen, Olivia Colman, Patrick Stewart, Professor Stephen Hawking, Victoria Wood, Obi-Wan Kenobi (Alec Guinness), Brian Cox, Al Pacino, Johnnie Walker, Elton John. Programmes parodied: Today, University Challenge, Tweet of the Day, Party political broadcast, Later... with Jools Holland, Who Do You Think You Are?, Let's Stay Together campaign, Johnnie Walker's Sounds of the 70s.
| 61 | 4 | "Episode 4" | Tom Jamieson & Nev Fountain, Ed Amsden, Tom Coles, Jon Culshaw, Laurence Howarth, Gráinne Maguire and Duncan Wisbey | 20 August 2014 |
Celebrities impersonated: Jim Naughtie, Evan Davis, William Hague, Michael Parkinson, Claudia Winkleman, Liam Neeson, Penélope Cruz, Nigel Farage, John Humphrys, Neil Oliver, Nick Clegg, Charles Carson (Jim Carter), John Bishop, Alex Jones, Dara Ó Briain, Professor Stephen Hawking, Brian Cox, Piers Morgan, Russell Crowe, Neil Nunes, Roy Hodgson, David Cameron, George Osborne, Boris Johnson, Sean Bean, Angelina Jolie. Programmes parodied: Today, Film..., Mastermind, Extraordinary People, Book of the Week, Made in Chelsea.
| 62 | 5 | "Episode 5" | Tom Jamieson & Nev Fountain, Ed Amsden & Tom Coles, Dan Audritt, James Bugg, Sarah Campbell, Jon Culshaw and Laurence Howarth | 27 August 2014 |
Celebrities impersonated: Glenn Campbell, Alistair Darling, Alex Salmond, Andy Murray, Evan Davis, Jim Naughtie, Jeremy Clarkson, Sylvester Stallone, Arnold Schwarzenegger, Mel Gibson, Al Pacino, Nigel Farage, Cora Crawley (Elizabeth McGovern), Robert Crawley (Hugh Bonneville), Isobel Crawley (Penelope Wilton), Charles Carson (Jim Carter), Dowager Countess of Grantham (Maggie Smith), Lady Rose MacClare (Lily James), Ray Winstone, Vince Cable, Jools Holland, Winifred Robinson, Morrissey, Neil Nunes, Helen Titchener (Louiza Patikas), Rob Titchener (Timothy Watson), Penelope Wilton, Alan Carr, Alan Bennett, Ian McKellen, Patrick Stewart, David Beckham, Maggie Smith, Sue MacGregor, Saint Peter, Thomas the Apostle, Judas Iscariot, David Cameron, Ed Miliband. Programmes parodied: Scotland Decides: Salmond versus Darling, Ice Bucket Challenge, Today, The Expendables, Downton Abbey, Later... with Jools Holland, You and Yours, The Archers, They Live, Pulp Fiction, Trainspotting, The Shining, Goodfellas, Doctor Who, The Reunion.
| 63 | 6 | "Episode 6" | Tom Jamieson & Nev Fountain, Ed Amsden, Sarah Campbell, Tom Coles, Jon Culshaw, Laurence Howarth and Gabby Hutchinson Crouch | 3 September 2014 |
Celebrities impersonated: John Humphrys, Jim Naughtie, Orla Guerin, Theresa May, Ed Miliband, Queen Elizabeth II, Claudia Winkleman, Bryan Mills (Liam Neeson), Nigel Farage, Charles Carson (Jim Carter), Robert Crawley (Hugh Bonneville), Dowager Countess of Grantham (Maggie Smith), Cora Crawley (Elizabeth McGovern), Lady Mary Crawley (Michelle Dockery), Simon Cowell, Penelope Wilton, Neil Nunes, Michael Buerk, Michael Portillo, Melanie Phillips, Kirsty Wark, Lyse Doucet, Bruce Forsyth, Roy Hodgson, Fiona Bruce, Clara Oswald (Jenna Coleman), Twelfth Doctor (Peter Capaldi), Dalek, Sue MacGregor, Boris Johnson. Programmes parodied: Today, Film..., Cash in the Attic, Taken, Downton Abbey, The Moral Maze, Newsnight, Strictly Come Dancing, BBC News at Ten, Doctor Who, The Reunion.

=== Series 13 (2014–15) ===
The thirteenth series starred Jon Culshaw, Jan Ravens, Debra Stephenson, Duncan Wisbey and Lewis MacLeod (episode 2). It was produced by Bill Dare.

| No. overall | No. in series | Title | Written by | Original release date |
|---|---|---|---|---|
| 64 | 1 | "Christmas 2014 Special" | Tom Jamieson & Nev Fountain, Ed Amsden, Tom Coles, James Bugg and Sarah Campbell | 26 December 2014 |
Celebrities impersonated: Michael Buerk, Clifford Longley, Melanie Phillips, Tinchy Stryder, Michael Portillo, Queen Elizabeth II, Ed Miliband, Cora Crawley (Elizabeth McGovern), Robert Crawley (Hugh Bonneville), Dowager Countess of Grantham (Maggie Smith), Lady Mary Crawley (Michelle Dockery), Charles Carson (Jim Carter), Jeremy Clarkson, Nigel Farage, Kirsty Young, Neil Nunes, Eddie Grundy (Trevor Harrison), Clarrie Grundy (Heather Bell/Penélope Cruz), Joe Grundy (Edward Kelsey/Bill Nighy), Rob Titchener (Anthony Hopkins), Mike Tucker (Michael Caine), Penelope Wilton, Sue MacGregor, Mary, mother of Jesus, Saint Joseph, Marcus the Innkeeper, Gabriel, Melchior, Evan Davis, Lyse Doucet, Abu Bakr al-Baghdadi, Nick Clegg, John Humphrys, Snow White, David Cameron, Boris Johnson, Diane Abbott, Theresa May, Mishal Husain. Programmes parodied: The Moral Maze, I'm a Celebrity...Get Me Out of Here!, The Queen's Christmas Message, Downton Abbey, Crimewatch, The Archers, The Reunion, Newsnight, Today.
| 65 | 2 | "New Years Special" | Tom Jamieson & Nev Fountain, Ed Amsden, Tom Coles, Jack Bernhardt, Max Davis, and Duncan Wisbey | 2 January 2015 |
Celebrities impersonated: Ian McKellen, Patrick Stewart, Judi Dench, Alan Bennett, Olivia Colman, Gogglebox narrator (Caroline Aherne), Eric Robson, Stephanie Parker, Dominic Parker, Kat Slater (Jessie Wallace), Mick Carter (Danny Dyer), Phil Mitchell (Steve McFadden), Dot Cotton (June Brown), Sharon Watts (Letitia Dean), Jennifer Worth (Vanessa Redgrave), Trixie Franklin (Helen George), Jenny Lee (Jessica Raine), Cynthia Miller (Bryony Hannah), Chummy Browne (Miranda Hart), Sister Evangelina (Pam Ferris), Dr. Christian Jessen, Dr. Pixie McKenna, Gareth Malone, Andy Murray, Judy Murray, Neil Nunes, Jamie Oliver, Nigella Lawson, Michael Buerk, Queen Elizabeth II, Charles, Prince of Wales, Catherine, Duchess of Cambridge, Prince William, Duke of Cambridge, Lady Mary Crawley (Michelle Dockery), Dowager Countess of Grantham (Maggie Smith), Peter Andre, Isobel Crawley (Penelope Wilton), Robert Crawley (Hugh Bonneville), Charles Carson (Jim Carter), Mariella Frostrup, John Hurt (as Pierre Bezukhov), Imelda Staunton (as Natasha Rostova), Twelfth Doctor (Peter Capaldi), Clara Oswald (Jenna Coleman), Dalek. Programmes parodied: Gogglebox, Gardeners' Question Time, EastEnders, Call the Midwife, Embarrassing Bodies, The Choir, Jamie's Cracking Christmas, Nigella's Christmas Kitchen, Downton Abbey, Open Book, War and Peace, You and Yours, The Archers, Doctor Who.

=== Series 14 (2015) ===
The fourteenth series starred Jon Culshaw, Jan Ravens, Debra Stephenson, Duncan Wisbey and Lewis MacLeod. It was produced and created by Bill Dare.

| No. overall | No. in series | Title | Written by | Original release date |
|---|---|---|---|---|
| 66 | 1 | "Episode 1" | Tom Jamieson & Nev Fountain, Tom Coles & Ed Amsden, James Bugg, Sarah Campbell, Laurence Howarth and Laura Major | 10 April 2015 |
Celebrities impersonated: Jim Naughtie, John Humphrys, Michael Fallon, Tina Daheley, Ed Miliband, Bryan Mills (Liam Neeson), Tony Blair, David Cameron, Sue Perkins, Mel Giedroyc, Julian Clary, Alan Carr, Nicola Sturgeon, Nigel Farage, Trevor McDonald, Nick Clegg, Michael Parkinson, Evan Davis, Leanne Wood, Jeremy Clarkson, Sarah Montague. Programmes parodied: Today, Newsbeat, Taken, Party political broadcast, The Great British Bake Off, ITV News Special Report, Newsnight.
| 67 | 2 | "Episode 2" | Tom Jamieson & Nev Fountain, Tom Coles & Ed Amsden, James Bugg, Sarah Campbell, Laurence Howarth and Laura Major | 17 April 2015 |
Celebrities impersonated: John Humphrys, Sarah Montague, Nick Robinson, William Hague, David Dimbleby, Nigel Farage, Nicola Sturgeon, Leanne Wood, Natalie Bennett, Hillary Clinton, Bill Clinton, Barack Obama, Trevor McDonald, Ed Miliband, Tina Daheley, Amir Khan, Andy Murray, David Cameron, Sooty, Sweep, Soo, The Apprentice narrator (Mark Halliley), Alan Sugar, Nick Hewer, Queen Elizabeth II, Vince Cable, Ian McKellen, Patrick Stewart, Judi Dench, Alan Bennett, Olivia Colman, Michael Caine, Eddie Izzard, John Craven, Paloma Faith, Sandi Toksvig, Brian Blessed, Samantha Cameron, Justine Miliband, Diane Abbott, John Langley. Programmes parodied: Today, BBC Election Debate 2015, ITV News Special Report, Newsbeat, The Apprentice, Party political broadcast, The Real Housewives.
| 68 | 3 | "Episode 3" | Tom Jamieson & Nev Fountain, Ed Amsden & Tom Coles, Laurence Howarth, James Bugg, Sarah Campbell, Jon Culshaw, Gráinne Maguire and Duncan Wisbey | 24 April 2015 |
Celebrities impersonated: Paul Lewis, Joyce the Wonga.com puppet, Liam Neeson, Nicola Sturgeon, Alex Salmond, Natalie Bennett, Evan Davis, Ed Miliband, Tina Daheley, Roy Hodgson, Kirsty Wark, William Hague, Dara Ó Briain, Ed Byrne, David Cameron, Alan Titchmarsh, Neil Nunes, Charles, Prince of Wales, Andrew Neil, Michael Portillo, Diane Abbott, Tesco advert narrator, George Galloway, Penelope Wilton, Boris Johnson, MasterChef narrator (India Fisher), Gregg Wallace. Programmes parodied: Money Box Live, The BBC Leader Interviews, Newsbeat, Newsnight, Dara and Ed's Great Big Adventure, Book of the Week, This Week, MasterChef.
| 69 | 4 | "Episode 4" | Tom Jamieson & Nev Fountain, Ed Amsden & Tom Coles, Laurence Howarth, James Bugg, Sarah Campbell, Jon Culshaw, Max Davis and Duncan Wisbey | 1 May 2015 |
Celebrities impersonated: David Dimbleby, David Cameron, Ed Miliband, Nick Clegg, Kirstie Allsopp, Queen Elizabeth II, Nigel Farage, Douglas Carswell, Mark Reckless, Mike Read, Jim Naughtie, John Humphrys, William Hague, Kenneth Williams, Michael Johnson, Kirsty Young, Nicola Sturgeon, Alex Salmond, Francine Stock, Harvey Keitel, Aleksandr Orlov, W1A narrator (David Tennant), Ian Fletcher/Robert Crawley/Henry Brown (Hugh Bonneville), Charles Carson (Jim Carter), Lady Mary Crawley (Michelle Dockery), Isobel Crawley (Penelope Wilton), Dowager Countess of Grantham (Maggie Smith), Roy Hodgson, Demelza Carne (Eleanor Tomlinson), Ross Poldark (Aidan Turner), Elizabeth Chynoweth (Heida Reed), Francis Poldark (Kyle Soller). Programmes parodied: Question Time Special, Location, Location, Location, Today, Crimewatch, The Film Programme, W1A, Downton Abbey, Paddington, Poldark.
| 70 | 5 | "Episode 5" | Tom Jamieson & Nev Fountain, Ed Amsden & Tom Coles, Laurence Howarth, James Bugg, Sarah Campbell, Jon Culshaw, Max Davis, Laura Major and Duncan Wisbey | 8 May 2015 |
Celebrities impersonated: Alex Salmond, Jim Naughtie, Ed Miliband, David Cameron, Wendy Lloyd, Paddy Ashdown, Nigella Lawson, Nick Clegg, Nigel Farage, Natalie Bennett, John Humphrys, David Miliband, David Dimbleby, Andrew Neil, Sophie Raworth, Jeremy Vine, Queen Elizabeth II, Rupert Murdoch, Nicola Sturgeon, Michael Portillo, Diane Abbott, William Hague, George Galloway, Douglas Carswell, Evan Davis, Lyse Doucet, Sarah Montague, Boris Johnson. Programmes parodied: Great British Menu, BBC Election 2015 coverage, Today, This Week, Newsnight.

=== Series 15 (2015) ===
The fifteenth series starred Jon Culshaw, Jan Ravens, Debra Stephenson, Duncan Wisbey and Lewis MacLeod. It was produced and created by Bill Dare. Episode 2 was recorded at the Edinburgh Festival Fringe.

| No. overall | No. in series | Title | Written by | Original release date |
|---|---|---|---|---|
| 71 | 1 | "Episode 1" | Tom Jamieson & Nev Fountain, Laurence Howarth, Ed Amsden & Tom Coles, James Bugg, Sarah Campbell, Duncan Wisbey and Liam Beirne | 14 August 2015 |
Celebrities impersonated: Andy Burnham (as Mr. Fantastic), Liz Kendall (as The Human Torch), Jeremy Corbyn (as The Thing), Yvette Cooper (as The Invisible Woman), John Humphrys, Jim Naughtie, Tony Hall, Terry Wogan, Evan Davis, Lyse Doucet, Charles, Prince of Wales, Andrew Neil, Tim Farron, Tina Daheley, Andy Murray, Sarah Montague, Ronnie Corbett, William Shakespeare, Arthur Conan Doyle, God, Mo Farah, Muttley, Dick Dastardly, Eric Robson, Bob Flowerdew, Bunny Guinness, David Cameron, Sara Cox, Pam Ayres, Morrissey, Chas & Dave. Programmes parodied: Fantastic Four, Today, Newsnight, Daily Politics, Newsbeat, Gardeners' Question Time, Sounds of the 80s.
| 72 | 2 | "Episode 2" | Tom Jamieson & Nev Fountain, Laurence Howarth, Ed Amsden & Tom Coles, Duncan Wisbey, James Bugg, Sarah Campbell and Laura Major | 21 August 2015 |
Celebrities impersonated: Tony Blair, Cherie Blair, Neil Kinnock, Alex Salmond, Jeremy Clarkson, Richard Hammond, James May, Neil Nunes, Rev. Richard Coles, Aasmah Mir, Penelope Wilton, Roger McGough, Carol Smillie, Professor Stephen Hawking, Alex Jones, Matt Baker, Liz Kendall, Simon Cowell, Colin Murray, Andy Gray, Stan Collymore, David Cameron, Tina Daheley, Tom Jones, Boy George, John Humphrys, Jim Naughtie, Ian Hislop, Donald Trump, Shaggy Rogers, Scooby-Doo, Fred Jones, Velma Dinkley, Kay Burley, Andy Burnham, Nigel Farage, Desmond Carrington, Paul McCartney. Programmes parodied: Top Gear on Amazon Video, Saturday Live, The One Show, Talksport, Newsbeat, Today, Scooby-Doo, Britain's Got Talent, Sky News, Desmond Carrington: The Music Goes Round.
| 73 | 3 | "Episode 3" | Nev Fountain & Tom Jamieson, Laurence Howarth, Ed Amsden & Tom Coles, James Bugg, Laura Major, Sarah Campbell, Max Davis, Duncan Wisbey and Liam Beirne | 28 August 2015 |
Celebrities impersonated: John Humphrys, Jim Naughtie, William Hague, David Cameron, Dave Lamb, Jeremy Corbyn, Yvette Cooper, Liz Kendall, Andy Burnham, Boris Johnson, Matt Baker, Alex Jones, Brendan Foster, Ed Miliband, Huw Edwards, Sophie Raworth, Gabby Logan, Mo Farah, Michael Johnson, Usain Bolt, Tuppence Beresford (Jessica Raine), Major Anthony Carter (James Fleet), Tommy Beresford (David Walliams), Andy Murray, Claire Underwood (Robin Wright), Francis J. Underwood (Kevin Spacey), Jeremy Clarkson, Neil Nunes, Paul Lewis, Anne Robinson, Hugh Fearnley-Whittingstall, Evan Davis, Lyse Doucet. Programmes parodied: Today, Come Dine with Me, The One Show, Cast Away, BBC News at Ten, BBC 2015 World Athletics Championships coverage, Partners in Crime, House of Cards, Money Box, Britain's Spending Secrets, River Cottage, Newsnight.
| 74 | 4 | "Episode 4" | Nev Fountain & Tom Jamieson, Laurence Howarth, Ed Amsden & Tom Coles, Sarah Campbell, Duncan Wisbey and Charlotte Pearson | 4 September 2015 |
Celebrities impersonated: John Humphrys, Bruce Forsyth, Rupert Murdoch, Liz Kendall, Yvette Cooper, Andy Burnham, Jeremy Corbyn, Neil Nunes, Kirsty Young, Kirsty Wark, David Cameron, Corrie Corfield, Kathy Clugston, Paul Lewis, Matthew Parris, Winifred Robinson, Sue MacGregor, Eric Robson, Bunny Guinness, Bob Flowerdew, Jean Ainslie (Penelope Wilton), Douglas Ainslie (Bill Nighy), Muriel Donnelly (Maggie Smith), Morgan Freeman, Andrew Neil, Michael Portillo, Diane Abbott, David Attenborough, Roger McGough, Ian McMillan, John Cooper Clarke, Kanye West, Roy Hodgson, Rev. Richard Coles, Aasmah Mir, Jim White, Kirsty Gallacher, Chris Kamara, Millie Clode, Adam Leventhal, Kate Abdo, Mike Wedderburn. Programmes parodied: Today, Desert Island Discs, Newsnight, Uncovered, Gardeners' Question Time, Extraordinary People, The Best Exotic Marigold Hotel, This Week, Tweet of the Day, Poetry Please, Shipping Forecast, Saturday Live, Sky Sports News, The Archers.
| 75 | 5 | "Episode 5" | Nev Fountain & Tom Jamieson, Laurence Howarth, Ed Amsden & Tom Coles, Laura Major, Sarah Campbell and Duncan Wisbey | 11 September 2015 |
Celebrities impersonated: Neil Nunes, David Attenborough, Huw Edwards, Sophie Raworth, Charles, Prince of Wales, Queen Elizabeth II, John Humphrys, Jim Naughtie, Alan Bennett, David Cameron, Tom Hardy (as Kray twins; Gilbert & George; Little and Large; Chuckle Brothers), Davina McCall, Nigel Farage, Donald Trump, Fiona Bruce, Tim Farron, Nick Clegg, Ed Balls, Jeremy Corbyn, Peter Dickson, George Galloway, Claudia Winkleman, Tess Daly, Jeremy Vine, Kirsty Wark, Michael Fallon, Phillip Schofield, Alex Jones, The Cube narrator (Colin McFarlane), Jools Holland, Kanye West, Mary Berry. Programmes parodied: Tweet of the Day, BBC News at Ten, Today, Legend, Long Lost Family, BBC News at Six, Mastermind, Strictly Come Dancing, Newsnight, The Cube, Later... with Jools Holland.

=== Specials (2015–16) ===
The 2015–16 specials starred Jon Culshaw, Jan Ravens, Debra Stephenson, Duncan Wisbey and Lewis MacLeod. It was produced and created by Bill Dare. The theme tune was altered to include sleigh bells.

| No. overall | No. in series | Title | Written by | Original release date |
|---|---|---|---|---|
| 76 | – | "Christmas 2015 Special" | Nev Fountain & Tom Jamieson, Laurence Howarth, Ed Amsden & Tom Coles, Sarah Campbell and Duncan Wisbey | 25 December 2015 |
Celebrities impersonated: Cora Crawley (Elizabeth McGovern), Robert Crawley (Hugh Bonneville), Dowager Countess of Grantham (Maggie Smith), Charles Carson (Jim Carter), Andrew Neil, Father Christmas, Rudolph the Red-Nosed Reindeer, Diane Abbott, Clara Oswald (Jenna Coleman), Twelfth Doctor (Peter Capaldi), John Humphrys, Jim Naughtie, Tim Farron, David Tennant, Miranda Hart, Richard Wilson, Bill Nighy, Al Pacino, Kirsty Wark, Cheryl Cole, Claudia Winkleman, Darth Vader (James Earl Jones), Mickey Mouse (as Luke Skywalker), Emperor Palpatine (Ian McDiarmid), Neil Nunes, Eric Robson, Bunny Guinness, Alan Bennett, Miss Mary Shepherd (Maggie Smith), Victoria Wood, Johnny Vegas, Jools Holland, John Lydon, Tom Jones, Kylie Minogue, Paul McCartney, Ross Kemp, Rob Titchener (Timothy Watson), Helen Titchener (Louiza Patikas), Donald Trump. Programmes parodied: Downton Abbey, Daily Politics, Doctor Who, Today, The crap British Christmas movie a la Nativity!, Newsnight, Film..., Star Wars, Gardeners' Question Time, The Lady in the Van, Mad Max: Fury Road, Jools' Annual Hootenanny, Ross Kemp: Extreme World, The Archers.
| 77 | – | "A Look Back at the Year 2020 Special" | Nev Fountain & Tom Jamieson, Laurence Howarth, Ed Amsden & Tom Coles, James Bugg, Sarah Campbell, Max Davis, Laura Major and Duncan Wisbey | 1 January 2016 |
Celebrities impersonated: Sarah Montague, John Humphrys, Donald Trump, Theresa May, David Cameron, Jeremy Vine, Alex Salmond, Nicola Sturgeon, Nick Clegg, Boris Johnson, Laura Kuenssberg, Nigel Farage, Tony Blair, Jon Snow, Eric Robson, Bunny Guinness, Neil Oliver, Michael Portillo, Gogglebox narrator (Caroline Aherne), Eddie Izzard, Sarah Millican, Ed Miliband, Ian McKellen, Andrew Neil, Diane Abbott, George Galloway, Ian McMillan, Tina Daheley, Adele, Barbara Windsor, Amir Khan, John Lydon, Charles, Prince of Wales. Programmes parodied: Today, Thought for the Day, Channel 4 News, Gardeners' Question Time, Coast, Great British Railway Journeys, This Week, Newsbeat.

=== Series 16 (2016) ===
The sixteenth series starred Jon Culshaw, Jan Ravens, Debra Stephenson (except episode 5), Duncan Wisbey (except episodes 5–6) and Lewis MacLeod (except episode 4). It was produced and created by Bill Dare.

| No. overall | No. in series | Title | Written by | Original release date |
|---|---|---|---|---|
| 78 | 1 | "Episode 1" | Nev Fountain & Tom Jamieson, Laurence Howarth, Ed Amsden & Tom Coles, Laura Major, Jack Bernhardt and Liam Beirne | 18 June 2016 |
Celebrities impersonated: Jim White, Greg Dyke, Charles, Prince of Wales, Queen Elizabeth II, Gordon Brown, Nicky Morgan, John Major, George Osborne, Boris Johnson, Nigel Farage, Roy Hodgson, Andrew Neil, Diane Abbott, Donald Trump, Judi Dench, Alan Bennett, Ian McKellen, Patrick Stewart, Eddie Izzard, Michael Gove, John Humphrys, Sarah Montague, David Cameron, Vladimir Putin, Tina Daheley, Boy George, John Lydon, Aleksandr Orlov, Donald Tusk, Jean-Claude Juncker, Priti Patel, Michael Parkinson, Jeremy Corbyn, Tim Farron. Programmes parodied: Sky Sports News, This Week, Today, Newsbeat.
| 79 | 2 | "Episode 2" | Nev Fountain & Tom Jamieson, Laurence Howarth, Ed Amsden & Tom Coles, James Bugg, Laura Major, Sarah Campbell, Max Davis, Jack Bernhardt and Liam Beirne | 24 June 2016 |
Celebrities impersonated: John Humphrys, Sarah Montague, Nicola Sturgeon, David Cameron, Sally Bercow, John Bercow, Nigel Farage, David Dimbleby, Laura Kuenssberg, Jeremy Vine, Donald Trump, Penelope Wilton, Michael Buerk, Melanie Phillips, Michael Portillo, Alan Bennett, Boris Johnson, Jon Snow, Jeremy Corbyn, François Hollande, Queen Elizabeth II, David Beckham, Paloma Faith, Bill Nighy, Barack Obama, Michael Parkinson, Roy Hodgson, Tony Blair, Tim Farron. Programmes parodied: Today, BBC EU Referendum coverage, The Moral Maze, Panorama, Channel 4 News.
| 80 | 3 | "Episode 3" | Tom Jamieson & Nev Fountain, Laurence Howarth, Ed Amsden & Tom Coles, Laura Major, Max Davis, Jack Bernhardt, Liam Beirne, Alex Harvey & Sarah Doran and Duncan Wisbey | 1 July 2016 |
Celebrities impersonated: Sarah Montague, John Humphrys, Roy Hodgson, Boris Johnson, Jeremy Corbyn, Barry Scott, Priti Patel, Michael Gove, Alex Jones, Matt Baker, Bryan Mills (Liam Neeson), Nigel Farage, Jon Snow, Theresa May, José Mourinho, Arsène Wenger, Evan Davis, Lyse Doucet, Eric Pickles, Neil Nunes, Pat Archer (Patricia Gallimore), Tony Archer (David Troughton), Helen Titchener (Louiza Patikas), Clarrie Grundy (Heather Bell), Eddie Grundy (Trevor Harrison), Joe Grundy (Edward Kelsey), Andrew Neil, Diane Abbott, Huw Edwards, Sophie Raworth, Neil Oliver, Chris Coleman, Jeremy Kyle, Angela Merkel, Nicola Sturgeon, Queen Elizabeth II. Programmes parodied: Today, The One Show, Channel 4 News, Newsnight, The Archers, This Week, BBC News, Coast, The Jeremy Kyle Show.
| 81 | 4 | "Episode 4" | Tom Jamieson & Nev Fountain, Laurence Howarth, Ed Amsden & Tom Coles, Sarah Campbell, Max Davis, Jack Bernhardt, Liam Beirne and Duncan Wisbey | 8 July 2016 |
Celebrities impersonated: John Humphrys, Sarah Montague, George W. Bush, Charles, Prince of Wales, Rupert Murdoch, Theresa May, Michael Gove, Tony Blair, Kirsty Wark, William Hague, Jasmine Harman, Alex Jones, Matt Baker, Neil Nunes, Clarrie Grundy (Heather Bell), Joe Grundy (Edward Kelsey), Rob Titchener (Timothy Watson), DI Ellie Miller (Olivia Colman), Andrea Leadsom, Evan Davis, Angela Eagle, Diane Abbott, Nigel Farage, Sophie Raworth, Jeremy Corbyn, Boris Johnson, David Dimbleby, Priti Patel, Germaine Greer, Mark Carney, Private Frazer (John Laurie), Morrissey. Programmes parodied: Today, Newsnight, A Place in the Sun, The One Show, The Archers, BBC News, Question Time.
| 82 | 5 | "Episode 5" | Nev Fountain & Tom Jamieson, Laurence Howarth, Ed Amsden & Tom Coles, James Bugg, Laura Major, Sarah Campbell, Jack Bernhardt, Alex Harvey and Sara Gibbs | 15 July 2016 |
Celebrities impersonated: Huw Edwards, Laura Kuenssberg, David Cameron, Sophie Raworth, Theresa May, Jeremy Corbyn, Robert Peston, Angela Eagle, John Humphrys, Sarah Montague, Boris Johnson, Gandalf, Andrew Marr, Queen Elizabeth II, Trevor McDonald, Ed Miliband, Margaret Thatcher, Andrew Neil, Diane Abbott, Donald Trump, Jon Snow, Michael Gove, Morgan Freeman, John Lydon, Penelope Wilton, Kirsty Wark, Michael Portillo, Nigel Farage, George Osborne, Nick Robinson, Jeremy Vine. Programmes parodied: BBC News Special, Peston on Sunday, Today, The Andrew Marr Show, ITV Tribute programme, This Week, Channel 4 News, Newsnight, Great Continental Railway Journeys, The Jeremy Vine Show.
| 83 | 6 | "Episode 6" | Nev Fountain & Tom Jamieson, Laurence Howarth, Ed Amsden & Tom Coles, James Bugg, Laura Major, Max Davis, Jack Bernhardt, Liam Beirne, Alex Harvey and Sara Gibbs | 22 July 2016 |
Celebrities impersonated: Neil Nunes, David Attenborough, Angela Eagle, John Humphrys, Sarah Montague, Donald Trump, Andrew Neil, Theresa May, Amber Rudd, David Davis, Boris Johnson, Neil Oliver, Recep Tayyip Erdoğan, Jeremy Corbyn, Hugh Grant, Sylvester Stallone, Trevor McDonald, Mo Farah, Roy Hodgson, Jim Naughtie, Huw Edwards, Laura Kuenssberg, Philip Hammond, Sam Allardyce, Pippa Middleton, Queen Elizabeth II, Morgan Freeman, Al Pacino, Alan Bennett, Jon Snow, Taylor Swift, Michael Gove, Diane Abbott, Nick Clegg, Tim Farron, Ozzy Osbourne, Christopher Walken, Greg Dyke, Nick Robinson, Kay Burley, Ian McKellen, Michael Caine. Programmes parodied: Tweet of the Day, Today, Daily Politics, Coast, Bridget Jones's Diary, BBC News, Sex and the City, Channel 4 News, This Week, Cool Runnings, Annie.

=== Specials (2016) ===
Starring Jon Culshaw, Jan Ravens, Debra Stephenson, Duncan Wisbey and Lewis MacLeod. It was produced and created by Bill Dare.

| No. overall | No. in series | Title | Written by | Original release date |
|---|---|---|---|---|
| 84 | – | "Christmas 2016 Special" | Tom Jamieson & Nev Fountain, Ed Amsden & Tom Coles, Laurence Howarth, Max Davis, Laura Major, Sarah Campbell and Jack Bernhardt | 23 December 2016 |
Celebrities impersonated: David Dimbleby, Laura Kuenssberg, Jeremy Vine, Emily Maitlis, Evan Davis, Andrew Neil, Theresa May, Mick Jagger, Neil Oliver, Donald Trump, Ian McKellen, Patrick Stewart, Judi Dench, Alan Bennett, Olivia Colman, Neil Nunes, Barack Obama, Kirstie Allsopp, Stanley Johnson, Boris Johnson, Diane Abbott, Father Christmas, Queen Elizabeth II, Michelle Obama, Melania Trump, Penelope Wilton, Helen Titchener (Louiza Patikas), Joe Grundy (Edward Kelsey), Clarrie Grundy (Heather Bell), Rob Titchener (Timothy Watson), Jeremy Corbyn, Huw Edwards, Cheryl Cole, Bob Geldof. Programmes parodied: BBC Election 2016 coverage, Coast, Kirstie's Homemade Christmas, Radio 4 Christmas Appeal, This Week, The Queen's Christmas Message, The Archers, BBC News at Ten.
| 85 | – | "The Alternative 2016 Special" | Tom Jamieson & Nev Fountain, Ed Amsden & Tom Coles, Laurence Howarth, Max Davis, James Bugg, Sarah Campbell and Jack Bernhardt | 30 December 2016 |
Celebrities impersonated: John Humphrys, Sarah Montague, Queen Elizabeth II, Fiona Bruce, David Attenborough, Claudia Winkleman, Ed Miliband, Brendan Foster, Michael Gove, Pam Ayres, Bob Dylan, Nick Robinson, Nicola Sturgeon, Natalie Bennett, Andrew Marr, Nigel Farage, David Cameron, Boris Johnson, Theresa May, Alan Sugar, Angela Eagle, Diane Abbott, Jim Naughtie, Alex Jones, Matt Baker, Hillary Clinton, Donald Trump, Kirsty Wark, Charles Carson (Jim Carter), Robert Crawley (Hugh Bonneville), Cora Crawley (Elizabeth McGovern), Lady Mary Crawley (Michelle Dockery), Dowager Countess of Grantham (Maggie Smith), Darth Vader (James Earl Jones), Joan Bakewell, Sue MacGregor, Clare Balding, Mark Pougatch, Mark Chapman, Roy Hodgson, Huw Edwards, Danny Dyer, David Dimbleby. Programmes parodied: Today, Antiques Roadshow, Planet Earth II, Strictly Come Dancing, The Andrew Marr Show, The One Show, Downton Abbey, Big Brother, Embarrassing Bodies, BBC News, The Queen's Christmas Message.

=== Series 17 (2017) ===
The seventeenth series starred Jon Culshaw, Jan Ravens, Debra Stephenson, Duncan Wisbey and Lewis MacLeod. It was produced and created by Bill Dare.

| No. overall | No. in series | Title | Written by | Original release date |
|---|---|---|---|---|
| 86 | 1 | "Episode 1" | Nev Fountain & Tom Jamieson, Laurence Howarth, Ed Amsden & Tom Coles, Sarah Campbell, James Bugg, Laura Major, Max Davis and Jack Bernhardt | 16 June 2017 |
Celebrities impersonated: Theresa May, Trevor McDonald, Tim Farron, Twelfth Doctor (Peter Capaldi), Bill Potts (Pearl Mackie), Jeremy Corbyn, Nick Robinson, Brenda from Bristol, Sarah Montague, Shaggy Rogers, Scooby-Doo, Paul Nuttall, Nigel Farage, David Attenborough, John Major, Ken Clarke, William Hague, Neville Chamberlain, Michael Gove, Amber Rudd, Caroline Flack, Donald Trump, First Dates narrator (Brian Protheroe), Arlene Foster, Fred Sirieix, Tony Blair, Ruth Davidson, Chris Packham, Tina Daheley, Paloma Faith, will.i.am, Ed Sheeran, Michael Parkinson, Nicola Sturgeon, David Cameron, Boris Johnson, Jeremy Vine, Laura Kuenssberg. Programmes parodied: Tonight with Trevor McDonald, Doctor Who, Panorama, Today, Walking with Dinosaurs, Love Island, First Dates, Springwatch, Newsbeat, The Jeremy Vine Show.
| 87 | 2 | "Episode 2" | Nev Fountain & Tom Jamieson, Laurence Howarth, Ed Amsden & Tom Coles, Sarah Campbell, James Bugg, Laura Major, Max Davis and Jack Bernhardt | 23 June 2017 |
Celebrities impersonated: Sarah Montague, Nick Robinson, Fiona Bruce, Justin Croft, Theresa May, Matt Baker, Alex Jones, Gyles Brandreth, Carol Klein, Lyse Doucet, Jeremy Corbyn, David Davis, Huw Edwards, Laura Kuenssberg, Tomasz Schafernaker, Andrew Neil, Diane Abbott, Boris Johnson, Ian McKellen, Patrick Stewart, Judi Dench, Alan Bennett, Donald Trump, Arlene Foster, Ed Miliband, Jeremy Vine, Jeanine Pirro, Jean-Claude Juncker, Nigel Farage, Sean Spicer, Lauren Laverne, Mark Radcliffe, Tina Daheley, James Corden, Pam Ayres. Programmes parodied: Today, Antiques Roadshow, The One Show, BBC News, This Week, The Jeremy Vine Show, Fox News, Justice with Judge Jeanine, BBC Glastonbury Festival 2017 coverage, Newsbeat, Carpool Karaoke.
| 88 | 3 | "Episode 3" | Nev Fountain & Tom Jamieson, Laurence Howarth, Ed Amsden & Tom Coles, Sarah Campbell, James Bugg, Laura Major, Max Davis and Jack Bernhardt | 30 June 2017 |
Celebrities impersonated: Theresa May, Nicola Sturgeon, Michael Gove, Andrew Neil, Jeremy Corbyn, David Davis, Tony Blair, Neil Nunes, Paul Lewis, Arlene Foster, Queen Elizabeth II, Tina Daheley, Andy Murray, Judy Murray, James Corden, Natalie Bennett, Jeanine Pirro, John McDonnell, Clarrie Grundy (Heather Bell), Helen Titchener (Louiza Patikas), Eddie Grundy (Trevor Harrison), Dot Cotton (June Brown), Joe Grundy (Edward Kelsey), Sean Spicer, Donald Trump, Huw Edwards, Laura Kuenssberg, David Cameron, Leanne Wood, Matt Baker, Alex Jones, Nigella Lawson, Paul Nuttall. Programmes parodied: Daily Politics, The Radio 1 Breakfast Show, Money Box Live, Newsbeat, Carpool Karaoke, Pick of the Pops, Fox News, Justice with Judge Jeanine, The Archers, BBC News at Ten, 606, The One Show, BBC Asian Network.
| 89 | 4 | "Episode 4" | Nev Fountain & Tom Jamieson, Laurence Howarth, Ed Amsden & Tom Coles, Sarah Campbell, James Bugg, Laura Major, Max Davis, Jack Bernhardt and Lewis Cook | 7 July 2017 |
Celebrities impersonated: John Humphrys, Sarah Montague, William Hague, Michael Portillo, Boris Johnson, Angela Merkel, Donald Trump, Theresa May, Diane Abbott, Jeremy Corbyn, Jeremy Hunt, Alex Jones, Matt Baker, Carol Kirkwood, Alan Sugar, Gyles Brandreth, David Davis, Neil Nunes, David Sedaris, Alan Bennett, Robert Peston, Jacob Rees-Mogg, Sixtus Rees-Mogg (as Maximus Decimus Meridius), Sue Barker, Martina Navratilova, John McEnroe, Emmanuel Macron, Michael Gove, Eric Robson, Hilary Mantel, Bunny Guinness, Sean Spicer, Tony Blair, Philip Hammond, Queen Elizabeth II, Nick Robinson, Arlene Foster, George Osborne, Nick Clegg, David Cameron. Programmes parodied: Today, The One Show, Meet David Sedaris, Peston on Sunday, BBC Wimbledon 2017 coverage, Gardeners' Question Time, The Reith Lectures with Hilary Mantel, Panorama.
| 90 | 5 | "Episode 5" | Nev Fountain & Tom Jamieson, Laurence Howarth, Ed Amsden & Tom Coles, Sarah Campbell, James Bugg, Laura Major, Max Davis, Jack Bernhardt, with additional material by Vivienne Riddoch & Jane McCutcheon | 14 July 2017 |
Celebrities impersonated: John Humphrys, Sarah Montague, Diane Abbott, Hillary Clinton, Kellyanne Conway, Aleksandr Orlov, Theresa May, Evan Davis, Anne Marie Morris, Boris Johnson, Matt Baker, Alex Jones, Gyles Brandreth, David Davis, Kirsty Young, John McDonnell, Jeremy Corbyn, Winifred Robinson, Hilary Mantel, Arlene Foster, Huw Edwards, Kirsty Wark, Love Island narrator (Iain Stirling), Caroline Flack, Michael Gove, Camilla Thurlow, Jamie Jewitt, Ross Kemp, Jacob Rees-Mogg, Sean Spicer, Donald Trump, Vince Cable. Programmes parodied: Today, Newsnight, The One Show, Desert Island Discs, You and Yours, BBC News at Ten, Love Island, Ross Kemp: Extreme World.
| 91 | 6 | "Episode 6" | Nev Fountain & Tom Jamieson, Laurence Howarth, Ed Amsden & Tom Coles, Sarah Campbell, Laura Major, Max Davis and Jack Bernhardt | 21 July 2017 |
Celebrities impersonated: Sarah Montague, John Humphrys, Andrew Neil, Diane Abbott, Jeremy Vine, Michael Gove, Twelfth Doctor (Peter Capaldi), Bill Potts (Pearl Mackie), Thirteenth Doctor (Jodie Whittaker), Theresa May, David Davis, Matt Baker, Alex Jones, Gyles Brandreth, Neil Nunes, Paul Lewis, Huw Edwards, Lyse Doucet, Sean Spicer, Donald Trump, Clarrie Grundy (Heather Bell), Tony Archer (David Troughton), Joe Grundy (Edward Kelsey), Eddie Grundy (Trevor Harrison), Lynda Snell (Carole Boyd), Fiona Bruce, Hilary Mantel, John McDonnell, Laura Kuenssberg. Programmes parodied: Today, This Week, BBC Election 2017 coverage, Doctor Who, The One Show, Money Box Live, BBC News at Ten, The Archers.

=== Specials (2017) ===
The 2017 specials starred Jon Culshaw, Jan Ravens, Debra Stephenson, Duncan Wisbey and Lewis MacLeod. It was produced and created by Bill Dare.

| No. overall | No. in series | Title | Written by | Original release date |
|---|---|---|---|---|
| 92 | – | "Christmas 2017 Special" | Tom Jamieson & Nev Fountain, Jack Bernhardt, Ed Amsden & Tom Coles, Laurence Howarth, Max Davis, James Bugg, Sarah Campbell, Laura Major and Duncan Wisbey | 22 December 2017 |
Celebrities impersonated: Queen Elizabeth II, Theresa May, David Davis, Louis Theroux, Father Christmas, Jeremy Corbyn, Sarah Huckabee Sanders, Donald Trump, Joan Bakewell, David Attenborough, Neil Nunes, Maxine Peake, Evan Davis, Vince Cable, John McDonnell, Diane Abbott, Andrew Neil, Michael Portillo, Tom Hardy. Programmes parodied: The Queen's Christmas Message, Louis Theroux's BBC Two specials, We Need to Talk About Death, Blue Planet II, BBC Radio 4 Christmas poems, Newsnight, Supermarket Christmas adverts, This Week.
| 93 | – | "The End of the World Special" | Tom Jamieson, Nev Fountain, Ed Amsden, Tom Coles, Laurence Howarth, Max Davis, James Bugg, Sarah Campbell and Jack Bernhardt | 29 December 2017 |
Celebrities impersonated: John Humphrys, Sarah Montague, Donald Trump, Dr. Rowan Williams, Theresa May, Michael Gove, Neil Nunes, Queen Elizabeth II, Evan Davis, Jeremy Corbyn, Eddie Grundy (Trevor Harrison), Joe Grundy (Edward Kelsey), Lexi Viktorova (Ania Sowinski), Clarrie Grundy (Heather Bell), Lynda Snell (Carole Boyd), Arlene Foster, Nigel Farage, David Davis, Penelope Wilton, Andrew Neil, Diane Abbott, Sarah Huckabee Sanders. Programmes parodied: Today, Thought for the Day, The Queen's Christmas Message, Newsnight, The Archers, Party political broadcast, The Nigel Farage Show on LBC, This Week, Wartime Broadcasting Service.

=== Special (2018) ===
This special guest starred Sanjeev Bhaskar as an extraterrestrial called Geoff. It was 45 minutes long instead of the usual 30.

| No. overall | No. in series | Title | Written by | Original release date |
|---|---|---|---|---|
| 94 | 1 | "An Alien Has Landed Special" | Unknown | 17 February 2018 |

=== Series 18 (2018) ===
The eighteenth series starred Jon Culshaw, Jan Ravens, Debra Stephenson, Duncan Wisbey (except episode 5), Lewis MacLeod (except episode 5) and Josh Berry (episodes 5–6). It was produced and created by Bill Dare. Episode 2 was recorded at the Craft of Comedy UK Festival Fringe in the Venue Cymru, Llandudno.

| No. overall | No. in series | Title | Written by | Original release date |
|---|---|---|---|---|
| 95 | 1 | "Episode 1" | Nev Fountain & Tom Jamieson, Laurence Howarth, Ed Amsden & Tom Coles, Sarah Campbell, James Bugg, Max Davis, Mike Shepherd, Sara Gibbs & Alex Hardy, Simon Alcock and Duncan Wisbey | 8 June 2018 |
Celebrities impersonated: Martha Kearney, Gyles Brandreth, Ken Livingstone, John Humphrys, Theresa May, Ed Miliband, Donald Trump, Tattoo Fixers narrator (Chris Jarman), Alice Perrin, Raheem Sterling, Neil Nunes, John Bercow, Kirsty Wark, Chris Grayling, David Davis, Joan Bakewell, Caroline Flack, Adam Collard, Arlene Foster, Michael Portillo, Sarah Huckabee Sanders, Steph McGovern, Jeremy Corbyn, Jacqui Oatley, Gareth Southgate, Harry Kane, Chas & Dave. Programmes parodied: Today, A Very English Scandal, Tattoo Fixers, Today in Parliament, Newsnight, We Need to Talk About Death, Love Island, The Handmaid's Tale, Great British Railway Journeys, BBC Breakfast, BBC Radio 5 Live.
| 96 | 2 | "Episode 2" | Nev Fountain & Tom Jamieson, Laurence Howarth, Ed Amsden & Tom Coles, Sarah Campbell, Sara Gibbs & Alex Hardy and Duncan Wisbey | 15 June 2018 |
Celebrities impersonated: John Humphrys, Martha Kearney, Nicola Sturgeon, John Bercow, Neil Nunes, Huw Edwards, Kim Jong-un, Donald Trump, Theresa May, Jeremy Thorpe (Hugh Grant), Paddington Bear (Ben Whishaw), Joan Bakewell, Gary Lineker, Alan Shearer, Harry Kane, Kirsty Wark, Sajid Javid, Demelza Carne (Eleanor Tomlinson), Ross Poldark (Aidan Turner), Rev. Osborne Whitworth (Christian Brassington), Sue MacGregor, Germaine Greer, Andrew Neil, Diane Abbott, Jeremy Corbyn, Jeremy Vine, David Davis. Programmes parodied: Today, BBC News Special Report, A Very English Scandal, Paddington 2, Inside the Ethics Committee, BBC 2018 FIFA World Cup coverage, Newsnight, Poldark, The Reunion, This Week, The Jeremy Vine Show.
| 97 | 3 | "Episode 3" | Nev Fountain & Tom Jamieson, Laurence Howarth, Ed Amsden & Tom Coles, Sarah Campbell, James Bugg, Max Davis, Vivienne Riddoch, Jane McCutcheon, Simon Alcock and Jack Bernhardt | 22 June 2018 |
Celebrities impersonated: Huw Edwards, John Bercow, Laura Kuenssberg, Theresa May, Donald Trump (as the Child Catcher), Gary Lineker, Alan Shearer, Jermaine Jenas, Rio Ferdinand, Alex Scott, Gabby Logan, Harry Kane, Kirsty Wark, Christopher Chope, Alan Sugar, Neil Nunes, Eric Robson, William Hague, Bob Flowerdew, Bunny Guinness, Stella Creasy, Michael Gove, Dennis Skinner, Andrew Neil, Jeremy Corbyn, Diane Abbott, Gandalf (Ian McKellen), Frodo Baggins (Elijah Wood), Matt Baker, Alex Jones, Gyles Brandreth, David Dimbleby, Jeremy Vine, David Davis. Programmes parodied: BBC News at Ten, Chitty Chitty Bang Bang, BBC 2018 FIFA World Cup coverage, Newsnight, The Apprentice, Gardeners' Question Time, Ocean's 8, Today in Parliament, Daily Politics, The Lord of the Rings, The One Show, BBC Election 2018 coverage.
| 98 | 4 | "Episode 4" | Nev Fountain & Tom Jamieson, Laurence Howarth, Ed Amsden & Tom Coles, Sarah Campbell, James Bugg, Max Davis, Simon Alcock and Duncan Wisbey | 29 June 2018 |
Celebrities impersonated: Martha Kearney, Nick Robinson, Roy Hodgson, Lyse Doucet, Michael Buerk, Winifred Robinson, Eric Robson, Bob Flowerdew, Bunny Guinness, Kirsty Young, Boris Johnson, Lauren Laverne, Mark Radcliffe, Cerys Matthews, Stuart Maconie, Steve Lamacq, Gary Lineker, Alan Shearer, Rio Ferdinand, Alex Scott, Gabby Logan, Harry Kane, Gareth Southgate, Kirstie Allsopp, Sarah Huckabee Sanders, John Humphrys, Jacob Rees-Mogg, Ian McKellen, Patrick Stewart, Judi Dench, Alan Bennett, Donald Trump, John McDonnell, Jeremy Corbyn, Theresa May, Jeremy Vine, Brian Cox, David Davis. Programmes parodied: Today, The Moral Maze, You and Yours, Gardeners' Question Time, Desert Island Discs, BBC 6 Music, BBC Glastonbury Festival fallow year coverage, BBC 2018 FIFA World Cup coverage, Location, Location, Location, The Jeremy Vine Show.
| 99 | 5 | "Episode 5" | Nev Fountain & Tom Jamieson, Laurence Howarth, Ed Amsden & Tom Coles, Sarah Campbell, James Bugg, Max Davis, Sara Doron and Alex Hardy | 6 July 2018 |
Celebrities impersonated: Gary Lineker, Gabby Logan, Jordan Pickford, Harry Kane, Alex Scott, Gareth Southgate, Rio Ferdinand, Kirsty Wark, Danny Dyer, Sven-Göran Eriksson, Martha Kearney, John Humphrys, Nick Robinson, Theresa May, Jacob Rees-Mogg, William Hague, Cheryl Cole, David Attenborough, Alex Jones, Matt Baker, Gyles Brandreth, Jeremy Corbyn, Diane Abbott, Sue Barker, Andy Murray, Huw Edwards, Thirteenth Doctor (Jodie Whittaker), Donald Trump, Love Island narrator (Iain Stirling), Dani Dyer, Michael Gove, Susanna Reid, Piers Morgan, Neil Nunes, Judi Dench, Robert Peston, Siri, Alexa, Ozzy Osbourne, Sarah Montague, Nigel Farage, Esther McVey, Boris Johnson. Programmes parodied: BBC 2018 FIFA World Cup coverage, Newsnight, Today, Planet Earth II, The One Show, BBC Wimbledon 2018 coverage, BBC News at Ten, Doctor Who, Love Island, Good Morning Britain, Radio 4 Appeal, Peston on Sunday, The World at One.
| 100 | 6 | "Episode 6" | Nev Fountain & Tom Jamieson, Laurence Howarth, Ed Amsden & Tom Coles, Sarah Campbell, James Bugg, Max Davis, Sara Gibbs, Alex Hardy and Lewis Cook | 13 July 2018 |
Celebrities impersonated: Neil Nunes, David Attenborough, Gary Lineker, Alan Shearer, Rio Ferdinand, Master Yoda (Frank Oz), Gabby Logan, Harry Kane, Jordan Pickford, Gareth Southgate, Sarah Huckabee Sanders, Donald Trump, Huw Edwards, Esther McVey, William Hague, John Bercow, Theresa May, Michael Gove, Martha Kearney, John Humphrys, Laura Kuenssberg, Nigel Farage, Kirsty Wark, Boris Johnson, David Davis, Mick Carter (Danny Dyer), Sue Barker, Boris Becker, Andy Murray, John McEnroe, Roger Federer, Jeremy Corbyn, Diane Abbott, Philip Hammond, Lord Summerisle (Christopher Lee). Programmes parodied: Tweet of the Day, BBC 2018 FIFA World Cup coverage, BBC News at Ten, Today, Newsnight, EastEnders, BBC Wimbledon 2018 coverage, The Wicker Man.

=== Specials (2018) ===
The 2018 specials starred Jon Culshaw, Jan Ravens, Debra Stephenson (except special #2), Duncan Wisbey and Lewis MacLeod. It was produced and created by Bill Dare.

| No. overall | No. in series | Title | Written by | Original release date |
|---|---|---|---|---|
| 101 | 1 | "Christmas 2018 Special #1" | Nev Fountain & Tom Jamieson, Laurence Howarth, Ed Amsden & Tom Coles, Sarah Campbell, James Bugg, Max Davis, Simon Alcock and Edward Tew | 7 December 2018 |
Celebrities impersonated: Theresa May, Huw Edwards, John Bercow, Laura Kuenssberg, Gerry Adams, Vince Cable, Boris Johnson, Jean-Claude Juncker, David Attenborough, Andrew Neil, Diane Abbott, Jeremy Corbyn, Tony Blair, Ian McKellen, J. K. Rowling, Patrick Stewart, Paloma Faith, Eddie Izzard, Mark Carney, Brian Cox, Donald Trump, Kirsty Wark, Michael Gove (as Gollum), Charlie Stayt, Steph McGovern, Tim Martin, John Humphrys, Martha Kearney, Jacob Rees-Mogg, Brian Blessed, Geoffrey Cox, Andrew Marr, Villanelle (Jodie Comer), Gandalf (Ian McKellen). Programmes parodied: BBC News at Ten, Planet Earth II, This Week, People's Vote campaign, CBeebies Bedtime Stories, Goldilocks and the Three Bears, Horizon, Newsnight, The Lord of the Rings, BBC Breakfast, Today, The Andrew Marr Show, Killing Eve.
| 102 | 2 | "Christmas 2018 Special #2" | Nev Fountain & Tom Jamieson, Laurence Howarth, Ed Amsden & Tom Coles, Sarah Campbell, James Bugg, Max Davis, Edward Tew, Sara Gibbs, Vivienne Riddoch and Jane McCutcheon | 14 December 2018 |
Celebrities impersonated: Theresa May, Andrew Neil, Jacob Rees-Mogg, John Humphrys, Martha Kearney, John Bercow, Jeremy Kyle, Boris Johnson, Jeremy Corbyn, Donald Trump, Huw Edwards, Jean-Claude Juncker, Emily Maitlis, John McDonnell, Harry Redknapp, Vince Cable, Nicola Sturgeon, Michael Gove, Neil Nunes, Eric Robson, Bunny Guinness, Bob Flowerdew, Gogglebox narrator (Craig Cash), Robert Mueller, Laura Kuenssberg, Arthur, King of the Britons (Graham Chapman), Theresa May (as Black Knight), Jeremy Corbyn (as William Wallace/Bryan Mills/Benjamin Braddock/Jerry Maguire), Diane Abbott (as Dorothy Boyd), David Dimbleby, Fiona Bruce. Programmes parodied: Politics Live, Today, BBC News at Ten, Newsnight, BBC Sounds, Gardeners' Question Time, Gogglebox, Monty Python and the Holy Grail, Braveheart, Taken, The Graduate, Jerry Maguire, Question Time.
| 103 | 3 | "Christmas 2018 Special #3" | Nev Fountain & Tom Jamieson, Laurence Howarth, Ed Amsden & Tom Coles, Sarah Campbell, James Bugg, Max Davis, Jack Bernhardt, Simon Alcock, Edward Tew, Sara Gibbs, Vivienne Riddoch and Jane McCutcheon | 21 December 2018 |
Celebrities impersonated: Neil Nunes, David Attenborough, Huw Edwards, Sophie Raworth, Jeremy Vine, Steph McGovern, Jacob Rees-Mogg, Donald Trump, Evan Davis, Diane Abbott, Jeremy Corbyn, Ian McKellen, Patrick Stewart, Judi Dench, Alan Bennett, Alexa (as Theresa May), Kirsty Wark, John McDonnell, Tim Martin, Michael Caine, Joan Collins, John Cleese, David Cameron, Clarence Odbody (Henry Travers), Nigel Farage, John Craven, Michael Buerk, Sue Barker, Eric Robson, Mary Berry, Michael Gove, Nick Robinson, Martha Kearney, Vince Cable, Thirteenth Doctor (Jodie Whittaker), Graham O'Brien (Bradley Walsh), Jools Holland, Katya Adler, Donald Tusk, Jean-Claude Juncker, Fiona Bruce, Henry Sandon, Theresa May. Programmes parodied: Tweet of the Day, BBC News Special, BBC Breakfast, PM, Newsnight, It's a Wonderful Life, Countryfile, The Moral Maze, A Question of Sport, Gardeners' Question Time, Today, Doctor Who, Jools' Annual Hootenanny, BBC News at Ten, Antiques Roadshow.

=== Compilations (2001–02) ===
| No. | Title | Original release date |
|---|---|---|
| 1 | "The Best of the Year – Part 1" | 28 December 2001 |
| 2 | "The Best of the Year – Part 2" | 29 December 2001 |
| 3 | "Compilation of the Year" | 27 December 2002 |

=== The Best of Dead Ringers (2004) ===
| No. | Title | Original release date |
|---|---|---|
| 1 | "Episode 1" | 23 January 2004 |
| 2 | "Episode 2" | 30 January 2004 |
| 3 | "Episode 3" | 6 February 2004 |
| 4 | "Episode 4" | 13 February 2004 |
| 5 | "Episode 5" | 20 February 2004 |
| 6 | "Episode 6" | 27 February 2004 |

== TV series ==
=== Pilot (2002) ===
| No. | Title | Directed by | Original release date | UK viewers (millions) |
|---|---|---|---|---|
| 1 | "Pilot" | John Birkin | 15 March 2002 | under 4.54 |

=== Series 1 (2002) ===
| No. | Title | Directed by | Original release date | UK viewers (millions) |
|---|---|---|---|---|
| 2 | "Episode 1" | Jonathan Gershfield & Pati Marr | 18 November 2002 | 3.9 |
| 3 | "Episode 2" | Jonathan Gershfield & Pati Marr | 25 November 2002 | 3.85 |
| 4 | "Episode 3" | Jonathan Gershfield & Pati Marr | 2 December 2002 | 3.16 |
| 5 | "Episode 4" | Jonathan Gershfield & Pati Marr | 9 December 2002 | 3.69 |
| 6 | "Episode 5" | Jonathan Gershfield & Pati Marr | 16 December 2002 | 3.11 |
| 7 | "Episode 6" | Jonathan Gershfield & Pati Marr | 26 December 2002 | under 2.04 |

=== Series 2 (2003) ===
| No. | Title | Directed by | Original release date | UK viewers (millions) |
|---|---|---|---|---|
| 8 | "Episode 1" | Jonathan Gershfield & Pati Marr | 7 July 2003 | 3.08 |
| 9 | "Episode 2" | Jonathan Gershfield & Pati Marr | 14 July 2003 | 2.69 |
| 10 | "Episode 3" | Jonathan Gershfield & Pati Marr | 21 July 2003 | 2.76 |
| 11 | "Episode 4" | Jonathan Gershfield & Pati Marr | 28 July 2003 | 2.85 |
| 12 | "Episode 5" | Jonathan Gershfield & Pati Marr | 4 August 2003 | 2.8 |
| 13 | "Episode 6" | Jonathan Gershfield & Pati Marr | 11 August 2003 | 2.55 |

=== Specials (2003–04) ===
| No. | Title | Directed by | Original release date | UK viewers (millions) |
|---|---|---|---|---|
| – | "Children in Need 2003 Special" | Unknown | 21 November 2003 | 10.49 (Note: Viewing figures are the average for the whole evening, not the slot in which the special was broadcast.) |
Note: Colin Baker and Sylvester McCoy reprised their roles as the Sixth and Seventh Doctors in the Weakest Link sketch, as well as John Leeson and Jon Briggs reprised his voice roles as K9 and the announcer of The Weakest Link respectively.
| 14 | "Christmas 2003 Special" | Geraldine Dowd | 22 December 2003 | 3.78 |
| 15 | "New Years Special" | Unknown | 2 January 2004 | 3.014 |
| – | "Happy Birthday BBC Two sketches" | Unknown | 20 April 2004 | 2.434 |

=== Series 3 (2004) ===
| No. | Title | Directed by | Original release date | UK viewers (millions) |
|---|---|---|---|---|
| 16 | "Episode 1" | Jonathan Gershfield & Pati Marr | 10 May 2004 | 2.645 |
| 17 | "Episode 2" | Jonathan Gershfield & Pati Marr | 17 May 2004 | 2.265 |
| 18 | "Episode 3" | Jonathan Gershfield & Pati Marr | 24 May 2004 | 2.158 |
| 19 | "Episode 4" | Jonathan Gershfield & Pati Marr | 31 May 2004 | 2.236 |
| 20 | "Episode 5" | Jonathan Gershfield & Pati Marr | 7 June 2004 | 2.342 |
| 21 | "Episode 6" | Jonathan Gershfield & Pati Marr | 14 June 2004 | 2.552 |

=== Series 4 (2004) ===
| No. | Title | Directed by | Original release date | UK viewers (millions) |
|---|---|---|---|---|
| 22 | "Episode 1/US Election 2004 Special" | Ben Fuller & Pati Marr | 1 November 2004 | 2.576 |
| 23 | "Episode 2" | Ben Fuller & Pati Marr | 8 November 2004 | 3.079 |
| 24 | "Episode 3" | Ben Fuller & Pati Marr | 15 November 2004 | 2.737 |
| – | "Children in Need 2004 Special" | Unknown | 19 November 2004 | 4.771 (Note: Viewing figures are the average for the whole evening, not the slot in which the special was broadcast.) |
| 25 | "Episode 4" | Ben Fuller & Pati Marr | 22 November 2004 | 2.366 |
| 26 | "Episode 5" | Ben Fuller & Pati Marr | 29 November 2004 | 2.285 |
| 27 | "Episode 6" | Ben Fuller & Pati Marr | 6 December 2004 | 2.266 |
| 28 | "Episode 7" | Ben Fuller & Pati Marr | 13 December 2004 | 2.585 |
| 29 | "Episode 8/Christmas 2004 Special" | Ben Fuller & Pati Marr | 26 December 2004 | 2.299 |

=== Series 5 (2005) ===
| No. | Title | Directed by | Original release date | UK viewers (millions) |
|---|---|---|---|---|
| 30 | "Episode 1/Election 2005 Special" | Ben Fuller & Pati Marr | 5 May 2005 | 2.188 |
| 31 | "Episode 2" | Ben Fuller & Pati Marr | 12 May 2005 | 2.122 |
| 32 | "Episode 3" | Ben Fuller & Pati Marr | 19 May 2005 | 2.402 |
| 33 | "Episode 4" | Ben Fuller & Pati Marr | 26 May 2005 | 1.937 |
| 34 | "Episode 5" | Ben Fuller & Pati Marr | 2 June 2005 | 2.138 |
| 35 | "Episode 6" | Ben Fuller & Pati Marr | 9 June 2005 | 2.387 |

=== Specials (2005) ===
| No. | Title | Directed by | Original release date | UK viewers (millions) |
|---|---|---|---|---|
| – | "Children in Need 2005 Special" | Unknown | 18 November 2005 | 4.59 (Note: Viewing figures are the average for the whole evening, not the slot in which the special was broadcast.) |
| 36 | "Christmas 2005 Special" | Ben Fuller & Pati Marr | 23 December 2005 | 2.37 |

=== Series 6 (2006) ===
| No. | Title | Directed by | Original release date | UK viewers (millions) |
|---|---|---|---|---|
| 37 | "Episode 1" | Ben Fuller & Pati Marr | 8 May 2006 | 2.03 |
| 38 | "Episode 2" | Ben Fuller & Pati Marr | 15 May 2006 | 1.79 |
| 39 | "Episode 3" | Ben Fuller | 22 May 2006 | 1.6 |
| 40 | "Episode 4" | Ben Fuller | 29 May 2006 | 1.66 |
| 41 | "Episode 5" | Ben Fuller | 5 June 2006 | 1.47 |
| 42 | "Episode 6" | Ben Fuller | 12 June 2006 | 1.9 |

=== Series 7 (2007) ===
| No. | Title | Directed by | Original release date | UK viewers (millions) |
|---|---|---|---|---|
| 43 | "Episode 1" | Ben Fuller | 22 February 2007 | 2.14 |
| 44 | "Episode 2" | Ben Fuller | 1 March 2007 | under 1.85 |
| 45 | "Episode 3" | Ben Fuller | 8 March 2007 | under 1.73 |
| 46 | "Episode 4" | Ben Fuller | 15 March 2007 | 1.74 |
| 47 | "Episode 5" | Ben Fuller | 22 March 2007 | 1.72 |
| 48 | "Episode 6" | Ben Fuller | 29 March 2007 | under 1.59 |
Note: In the final sketch of this episode, prior to resignation as prime minister, Tony Blair is seen regenerating into David Tennant (the Tenth Doctor) during an interview with Nick Robinson, after stating that the Blair legacy must go on.
