= Jay Hunt (TV presenter) =

British TV presenter

Jay Hunt (born 1965) is the managing director of Violet Productions, a London-based video production company. Violet Productions was set up in 2008. Before founding Violet Productions, Hunt worked as TV producer for the BBC and UK based indie TV companies. She has previously worked as a celebrity stylist, personal shopper and TV presenter.

Hunt has worked in television since 1990, and was a presenter of the dating show Would Like to Meet, dieting show Do Or Diet and was the resident style presenter on Housecalls. She co-wrote the series-accompanying book Would Like to Meet: The Ultimate Dating Makeover in 2002.

She presented the series Style High Club for Discovery Health and has presented four series of Spendaholics for BBC Three.

She is a regular contributor to both TV and radio on subjects varying from style (including Woman's Hour on BBC Radio 4), to the credit crunch, in response to which her book Spendsmart was published in February 2009 by Little Brown. She was also the contributing fashion editor for UK monthly women's magazine Eve, with a fashion advice column.

== Personal life ==
Hunt lived in London with her partner, Margot James, MP for Stourbridge from 2010 until 2019.
