= Would Like to Meet =

- Genre: Reality, Dating
- Presented by: Lowri Turner
- Starring: Tracey Cox (relationship expert); Steven Anderson (confidence coach); Jeremy Milnes (confidence coach); Jay Hunt (stylist); Spencer Hawken (confidence coach/stylist)
- Country of origin: United Kingdom
- Original language: English
- No. of seasons: 3

Original release
- Network: BBC Two

Would Like to Meet is a British reality television dating series, first broadcast on BBC Two in 2001. Presented by Lowri Turner, it featured relationship expert Tracey Cox, confidence coach Steven Anderson (later replaced by Jeremy Milnes) celebrity stylist Jay Hunt and Debenhams fashion director Spencer Hawken, who each used their expertise to help a singleton find a date. The show ran for three series until 2003. This was followed by a one-off celebrity special in 2004 where the experts helped TV presenter Esther Rantzen.

The series led to numerous success stories, one of whom was Jon Massey, the subject of programme two of series two. As a direct result of his being featured in the programme, he was contacted after transmission by a woman who became his future wife.

Having changed his name in the meantime to Jon McKnight, he was married at The Ritz in London on 19 December 2004. Jeremy Milnes, who had acted as his confidence coach during the filming of the programme, and Alannah Richardson, the series producer, were guests of honour at the wedding in the hotel's Marie Antoinette Suite.

== Would Like To Meet Again ==
A six-part series called Would Like To Meet Again, was broadcast on BBC Two from 14 August to 18 September 2008. Made by Talkback Thames, the company that produced the original series, it featured 12 past contributors from Would Like To Meet.

Each programme followed two contributors to find out what happened next. The producers say, in a press release issued on 16 June 2008, that the 12 contributors featured in the new series account for three weddings, one engagement, and five babies – with only four people left looking for love.

The new series featured the original presenters.

Jon McKnight one of the original subjects of the show Would Like To Meet was featured in Would Like to Meet Again.
