= Ralph Kilner Brown =

British athlete, politician and jurist

Personal information
- Nationality: British (English)
- Born: 28 August 1909 Calcutta, India
- Died: 15 June 2003 (aged 83)

Sport
- Sport: Athletics
- Event: hurdles
- Club: Achilles Club
Medal record
Men's athletics
Representing England
British Empire Games
| Bronze medal – third place | 1934 London | 440 yd hurdles |

Sir Ralph Kilner Brown, OBE, TD, DL (28 August 1909 – 15 June 2003), was a British hurdler, Liberal Party politician and jurist.

== Background ==
He was born in Calcutta, the son of Rev. A. E. Brown. He was educated at Kingswood School, Bishop Vesey's Grammar School and Trinity Hall, Cambridge.

He married, in 1943, Cynthia Rosemary Breffit. They had one son, two daughters and five grandchildren.

== Sports career ==
Brown represented the Achilles Club and became the national 440y hurdles champion after winning the British AAA Championships title at the 1934 AAA Championships.

Shortly afterwards, he represented England at the 1934 British Empire Games, where he won the bronze medal in the 440 yards hurdles event. He missed the 1936 Summer Olympics due to injury. His brother Godfrey and sister Audrey both won medals.

== Professional career ==
In 1934 he was Called to the Bar by Middle Temple and worked at the chambers of Donald Finnemore.

He was commissioned into the Royal Army Service Corps in March 1939 and served on Field Marshal Montgomery's staff planning the Normandy landings.

In 1954 he was appointed deputy chairman of the Warwickshire Quarter Sessions, becoming chairman ten years later. He served as recorder of Lincoln from 1960 to 1964 and recorder of Birmingham from 1964 to 1965. He was an additional judge at the Old Bailey before becoming Recorder of Liverpool from 1967 to 1969.

He became a High Court judge in 1970 on the Northern Circuit and served until 1985. He was knighted in February 1970 and also appointed a Deputy Lieutenant of Warwickshire.

In 1991 his first book was published Top Brass and No Brass: Inside Story of the Alliance Between Britain and America.

== Political career ==
At Cambridge University he was the runner-up for the Presidency of the Cambridge Union and president of the University Liberal Club, 1931–2. He had become noticed already through his many impassioned speeches as a Young Liberal in opposition to appeasement.

In 1939 he was adopted as Liberal prospective parliamentary candidate for the Stourbridge Division of Worcestershire in succession to his chambers boss Donald Finnemore, but had to wait until after the war ended in 1945 to fight an election. Despite starting in third place, he managed to increase the Liberal share of the vote;

General Election 1945: Stourbridge Electorate 97,095
| Party | Candidate | Votes | % | ±% |
|---|---|---|---|---|
| Labour | Arthur Moyle | 34,912 | 48.5 | +14.2 |
| Conservative | Robert Harry Morgan | 18,979 | 26.3 | −17.2 |
| Liberal | Lt-Col. Ralph Kilner Brown | 18,159 | 25.2 | +3.0 |
| Majority | | 15,933 | 22.1 | |
| Turnout | | | 74.2 | |
| Labour gain from Conservative | | Swing | | |

He was President of Birmingham Liberal Organisation, 1946–56. At the 1950 General Election, after boundary changes, Stourbridge was divided with part going into the new Oldbury and Halesowen seat. He fought this new seat for the Liberals, finishing third again:

General election 1950: Oldbury and Halesowen
| Party | Candidate | Votes | % | ±% |
|---|---|---|---|---|
| Labour | Arthur Moyle | 28,379 | 50.42 | |
| Conservative | Laurence Cecil Baxter | 17,281 | 30.71 | |
| Liberal | Ralph Kilner Brown | 10,620 | 18.87 | |
| Majority | | 11,098 | 19.71 | |
| Turnout | | 56,640 | 86.28 | |
| Labour win (new seat) | | | | |

He was chairman of the West Midlands Liberal Federation, 1950–56. He was a member of the Liberal Party National Executive, 1950–56. In 1959 he was Liberal candidate for the South Buckinghamshire Division. At the general election he finished third once more:

General election 1959: South Buckinghamshire
| Party | Candidate | Votes | % | ±% |
|---|---|---|---|---|
| Conservative | Ronald Bell | 34,154 | 59.10 | |
| Labour | Richard J Sankey | 13,050 | 22.58 | |
| Liberal | Ralph Kilner Brown | 10,589 | 18.32 | |
| Majority | | 21,104 | 36.52 | |
| Turnout | | 57,793 | 79.75 | |
| Conservative hold | | Swing | | |

He continued to play an active part within the Liberal Party at a national level, being a Member of Liberal Party Council. He fought South Buckinghamshire again at the following general election in 1964 and this time pushed the Labour candidate into third place. However, this was his last parliamentary contest.

General election 1964: South Buckinghamshire
| Party | Candidate | Votes | % | ±% |
|---|---|---|---|---|
| Conservative | Ronald Bell | 33,905 | 52.75 | |
| Liberal | Ralph Kilner Brown | 16,151 | 25.13 | |
| Labour | John Ryan | 14,216 | 22.12 | |
| Majority | | 17,754 | 27.62 | |
| Turnout | | 64,272 | 78.89 | |
| Conservative hold | | Swing | | |

In 1970 he declined an invitation to become a Liberal peer but accepted a knighthood.
