= Debra Shipley =

British politician

Member of Parliament for Stourbridge
- In office 2 May 1997 – 11 April 2005
- Preceded by: Constituency established
- Succeeded by: Lynda Waltho

Personal details
- Born: 22 June 1957 (age 68)
- Party: Labour

Debra Ann Shipley (born 22 June 1957) is a politician in the United Kingdom. She was Labour Party Member of Parliament (MP) for Stourbridge from 1997 until the 2005 general election, when she stood down for reasons of ill health. She was succeeded by Lynda Waltho, also from the Labour Party.

Shipley was the first woman MP for Stourbridge, but not the first Labour MP to sit for the town under different boundaries: Wilfred Wellock had been the Labour MP from 1927 to 1931 (for Stourbridge); Arthur Moyle from 1945 to 1950 (Stourbridge); George Wigg from 1950 to 1968 (for Dudley, which was lost to the Tories in a by-election in 1968 following Wigg's ill-health and appointment to the National Horseracing Board), and John Gilbert from 1970 to 1974 (for Dudley, as Labour regained Dudley at the 1970 general election).

Following Shipley's departure from Parliament in 2005, she later left the Labour Party, and in 2019 campaigned for Change UK in Norfolk.

== Parliament ==
Shipley was selected to stand for election for Labour through an all-women shortlist. As an MP, Shipley's most significant initiative was the Protection of Children Act, which passed with cross-party support, it requires that childcare organizations now check new staff against a newly created registry of child abusers. Shipley was also responsible for the Children's Food Bill, which called for the removal of "unhealthy" food from school vending machines and improvements to school meals. The latter bill attracted the support of celebrity chef Jamie Oliver.

Shipley served on the Culture Media and Sport Select Committee, and was Parliamentary Ambassador to the NSPCC, in which capacity she fronted the "Full Stop" Campaign in Parliament. Shipley generally voted with her party.

Parliament of the United Kingdom
New constituency	Member of Parliament for Stourbridge; 1997–2005	Succeeded by Lynda Waltho
