= Henry Hogbin =

English businessman and politician (1880–1966)

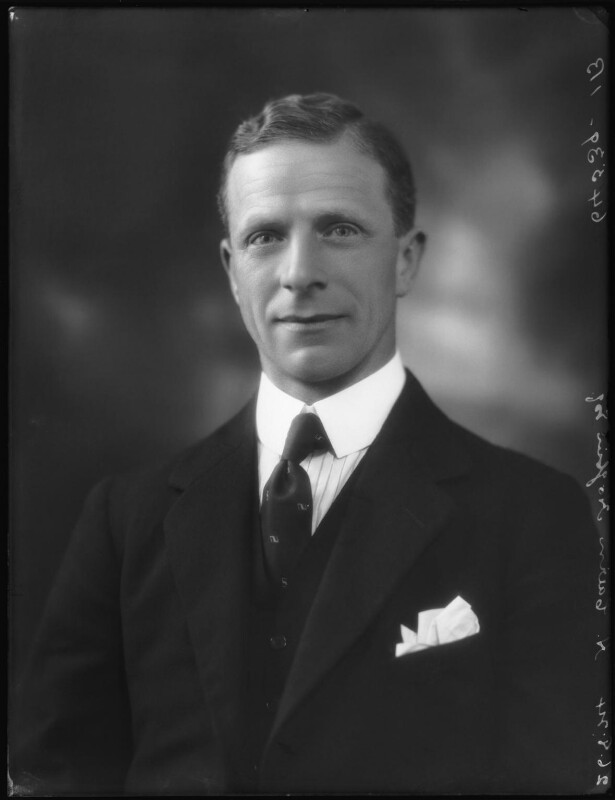
- Hogbin in 1924

Member of Parliament for Battersea North
- In office 6 December 1923 – 29 October 1924
- Preceded by: Shapurji Saklatvala
- Succeeded by: Shapurji Saklatvala

Personal details
- Born: Henry Cairn Hogbin; 16 November 1880 Tilmanstone, Kent, United Kingdom
- Died: 13 June 1966 (aged 85) Bournemouth, United Kingdom
- Spouse(s): Winfred (m.1905-40); Jessie Sutherland (m.1955-66)

Henry Cairn Hogbin (16 November 1880 – 13 June 1966) was an English businessman and Liberal, later Conservative, politician.

== Family and education ==
Henry Cairn Hogbin was the son of Thomas Parker Hogbin of Tilmanstone, Eastry in Kent. He attended Montague House School and received the rest of his education privately. He married his first wife, Winfred, in 1905 and they had two sons and four daughters. Winifred Hogbin died in 1940 and in 1955 Hogbin married Jessie McKenzie Sutherland.

== Career ==
In business, Hogbin had interests in the agricultural chemical industry. He worked for Lawe's Chemical Company and was later Chairman of the Allied Guano and Chemical Company. During the First World War he held a position in the Ministry of Food. He organised agricultural production and was Chairman of the Home Counties Claims Commission.

== Politics ==
=== 1922 ===
Hogbin first stood for Parliament at the 1922 general election in Battersea North as a National Liberal i.e. a supporter of the wing of the Liberal Party led by David Lloyd George. The seat was won by the Communist candidate, Shapurji Saklatvala, who had the support of the local the Labour Party. Hogbin came second to Saklatvala, 2,021 votes behind. The Independent Asquithian Liberal, V C Albu, lost his deposit. As a portent of worse things to come in later elections, Hogbin's meetings were disrupted by people claiming to be supporters of Saklatvala.

=== 1923-1924 ===
At the 1923 Hogbin secured the nomination of the now re-united Liberal Party but his candidacy was also endorsed by the local Conservatives in order to oppose Saklatvala, who they regarded as a revolutionary and unconstitutional candidate. At one point in the campaign Hogbin discontinued holding indoor election meetings claiming this was as a result of Labour intimidation and disruption. It was also feared he would be prevented from canvassing and he had to seek the protection of the police. In the end, Hogbin's pact with the Conservatives was just enough to ensure his victory by the narrow margin of 186 votes in a straight fight with Saklatvala. During his time in Parliament Hogbin often voted with the Conservatives against the Labour government, perhaps aware of his reliance on Tory support and votes in North Battersea. However he held his seat for just one year. In the 1924 general election Hogbin stood this time as a Constitutionalist (i.e. a Liberal with Conservative support). Again the campaign was marred by disruption and violence. On one occasion a stone was thrown through Hogbin's car window hitting him near the eye. Hogbin's election day organisation was disrupted and it was surmised that some potential Constitutionalist electors were discouraged from going out to vote by the prospect of rowdyism near polling stations. When the result was declared Hogbin trailed Saklatvala by 542 votes.

=== Conservative ===
In 1926, Hogbin took the decision to leave the Liberal Party. He wrote to party leader Lord Oxford explaining that he did not believe the Liberal Party any longer represented an effective instrument for fighting what he called ‘the pernicious doctrine’ of socialism. Hogbin's experience of co-operation with the Conservative Party was a clear factor in his decision to leave the Liberal Party and follow other politicians, most famously Winston Churchill, who had stood under the Constitutionalist banner in 1924, into the Tory Party itself. In 1927, Hogbin was chosen as Conservative candidate in the 1927 Stourbridge by-election in Worcestershire. The sitting Tory MP, Douglas Pielou, had died and Hogbin faced a three-cornered contest with Labour and Liberal opponents. He failed to hold the seat however which was gained by Labour's Wilfred Wellock. Hogbin did not stand for Parliament again.

== Other public appointments ==
Hogbin was appointed a Justice of the Peace for the County of Middlesex in 1928. He was a keen amateur sportsman, playing cricket, tennis and golf and he founded the Magistrates’ Golfing Society in 1938.

== Death ==
Hogbin died in a Bournemouth nursing home on 13 June 1966 aged 85 years.

Parliament of the United Kingdom
Preceded by Shapurji Saklatvala	Member of Parliament for Battersea North; 1923 – 1924	Succeeded by Shapurji Saklatvala
