= Perrycroft =

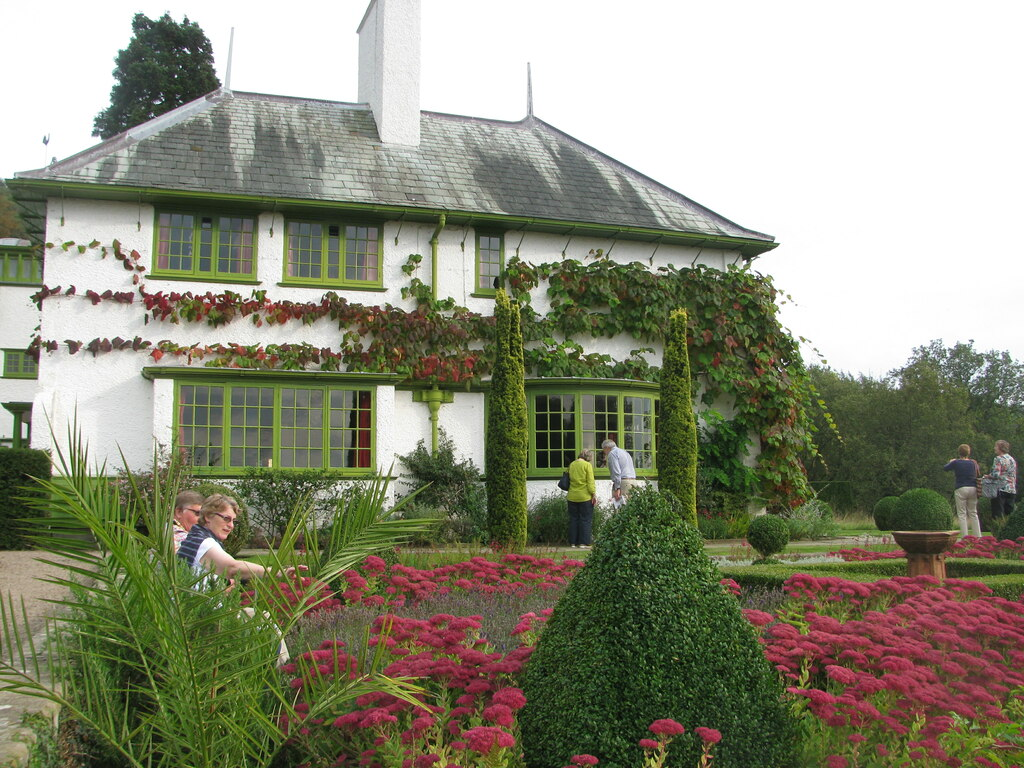
- "One of Vosey's best"

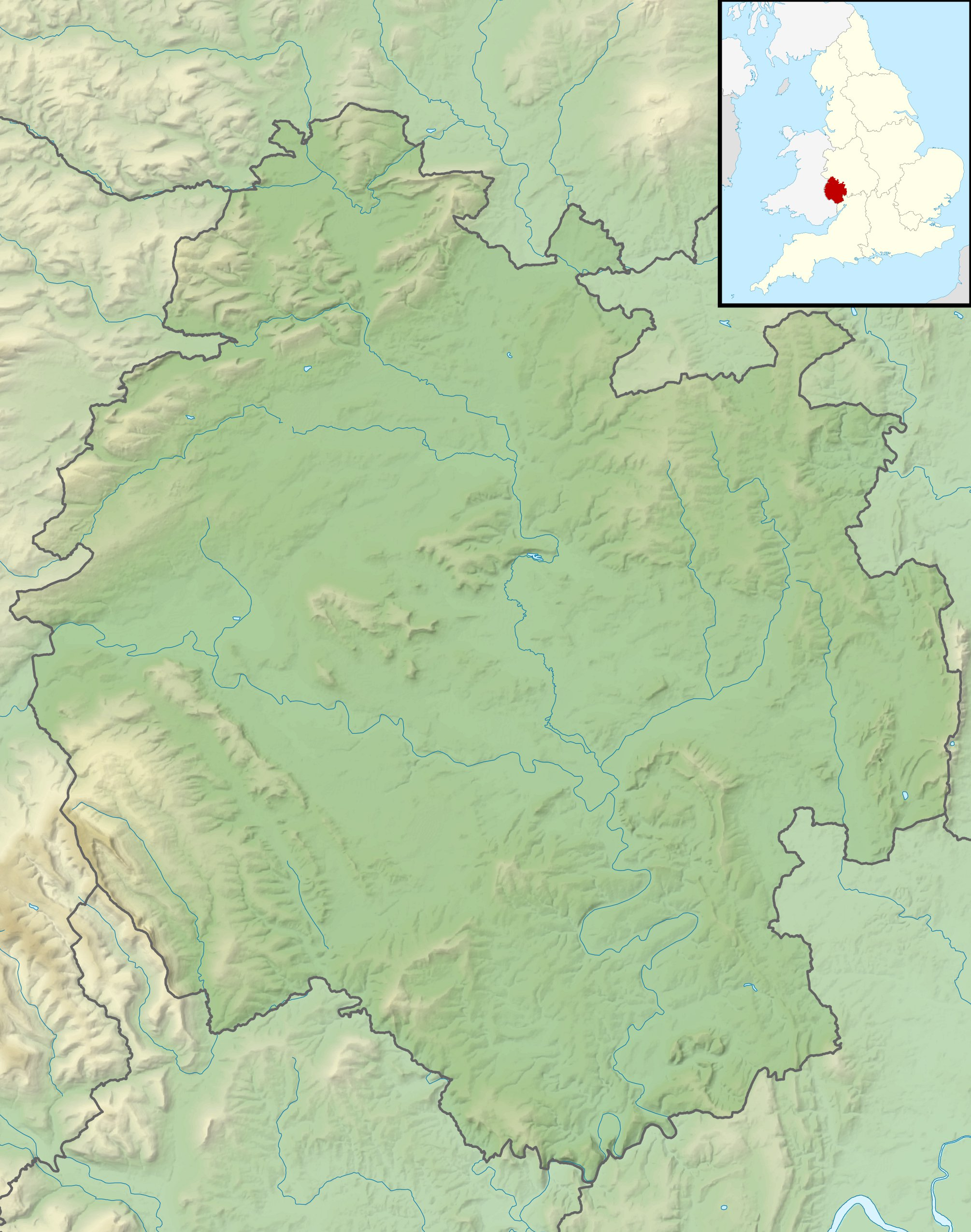
- Location within Herefordshire
- 52.0741°N 2.3437°W
- Type: Country house
- Location: Colwall, Herefordshire

History
- Built: 1893-1895

Site notes
- Architect: C. F. A. Voysey
- Architectural style: Arts & Crafts
- Governing body: Privately owned

Listed Building – Grade II*
- Official name: Perrycroft
- Designated: 18 February 1970
- Reference no.: 1178660

Listed Building – Grade II*
- Official name: Summerhouse, gate, boundary walls south west of Perrycroft
- Designated: 19 September 1984
- Reference no.: 1349715

Listed Building – Grade II
- Official name: Perrycroft Lodge
- Designated: 18 February 1970
- Reference no.: 1082156

Listed Building – Grade II
- Official name: Coachhouse, cottage and tack-room west of Perrycroft Lodge
- Designated: 18 February 1970
- Reference no.: 1178672

Listed Building – Grade II
- Official name: Stables About 75 Yards Northwest of Perrycroft Lodge
- Designated: 18 February 1970
- Reference no.: 1178680

Perrycroft is a country house in the district of Colwall, Herefordshire, England. The house was built between 1893-1895 and was designed by C. F. A. Voysey for John William Wilson. Perrycroft is a Grade II* listed building.

== History ==
John William Wilson, PC, JP (22 October 1858 – 18 June 1932) was a British chemical manufacturer and politician who served for 27 years as a Liberal member of parliament (MP) for North Worcestershire. His father, John Edward Wilson, had founded the chemical manufacturers, Albright and Wilson, in 1856, in partnership with his fellow Quaker, Arthur Albright. The firm specialised in phosphorus production, principally for the making of matches and became extremely successful. John William Wilson followed his father onto the board of Albright and Wilson, and also held directorships with other major concerns, including Bryant & May and the Great Western Railway. (Note: Historic England, among others, describes John William Wilson as a "railway magnate", although his fortune derived from the family chemical works.)

Wilson knew the area of the Malvern Hills through family connections, and it was proximate to the Oldbury site of the Albright and Wilson works. In 1893 he bought 80 acres of land around Colwall and commissioned Charles Vosey to design a country house. Pevsner records the price as £4,900. Perrycroft was Vosey's first major commission and did much to establish his reputation. (Note: Vosey became a favoured architect of the English upper-middle classes, designing houses for businessmen, politicians and artists. The First World War virtually destroyed his architectural practice, and his last decades saw him largely focused on furniture and fabric design.)

Perrycroft remains privately owned but the gardens and house are occasionally opened for visitors.

== Architecture and description ==
The house is designed in Vosey's trademark Arts and Crafts style. The hipped roofs are of green/grey slate, with sweeping eaves, and five monumental chimney stacks. The bell bracket on the "pagoda-like" tower at the entrance front displays another typical Vosey feature; the bracket is a stylised human face or grotesque, a device he often deployed. Historic England considers it "one of Vosey's best houses". Vosey's 21st century biography, David Cole, in his study, The Art of CFA Voysey, describes it as "the very essence of a 'Vosey house', not only in its catalogue of Vosey details and palette of materials, but also in its form and .... composition". Alan Brooks, in his Herefordshire volume in the Pevsner Buildings of England series, revised and reissued in 2012, notes that the interior is "exceptionally well preserved", with much of Voysey's original fittings and furnishings still in situ. Perrycroft is a Grade II* listed building. Other listed structures on the estate include a summer house, a lodge, a coach house, and two sets of stables.

== Gallery ==
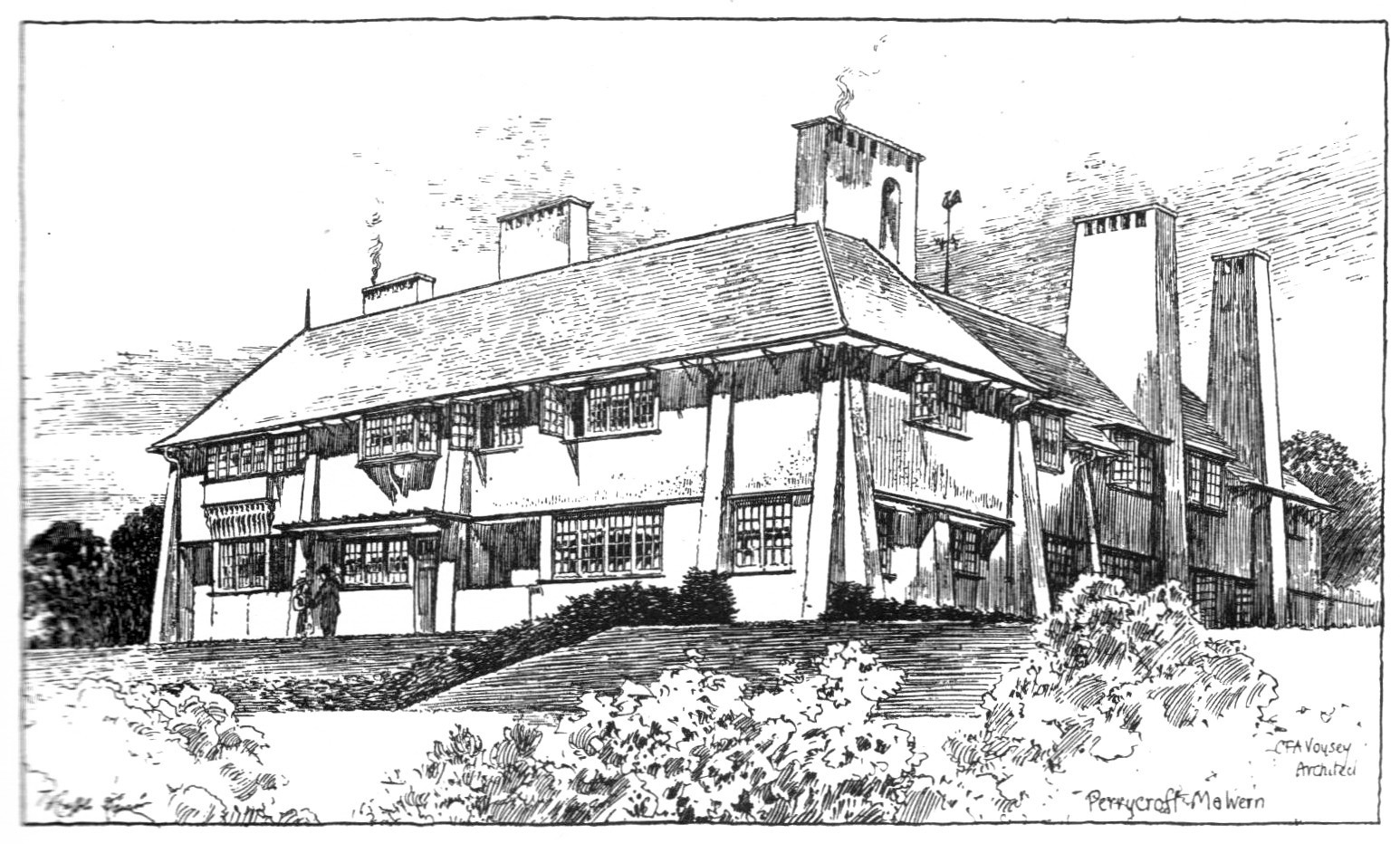
Illustration of Perrycroft from Modern Homes, 1909

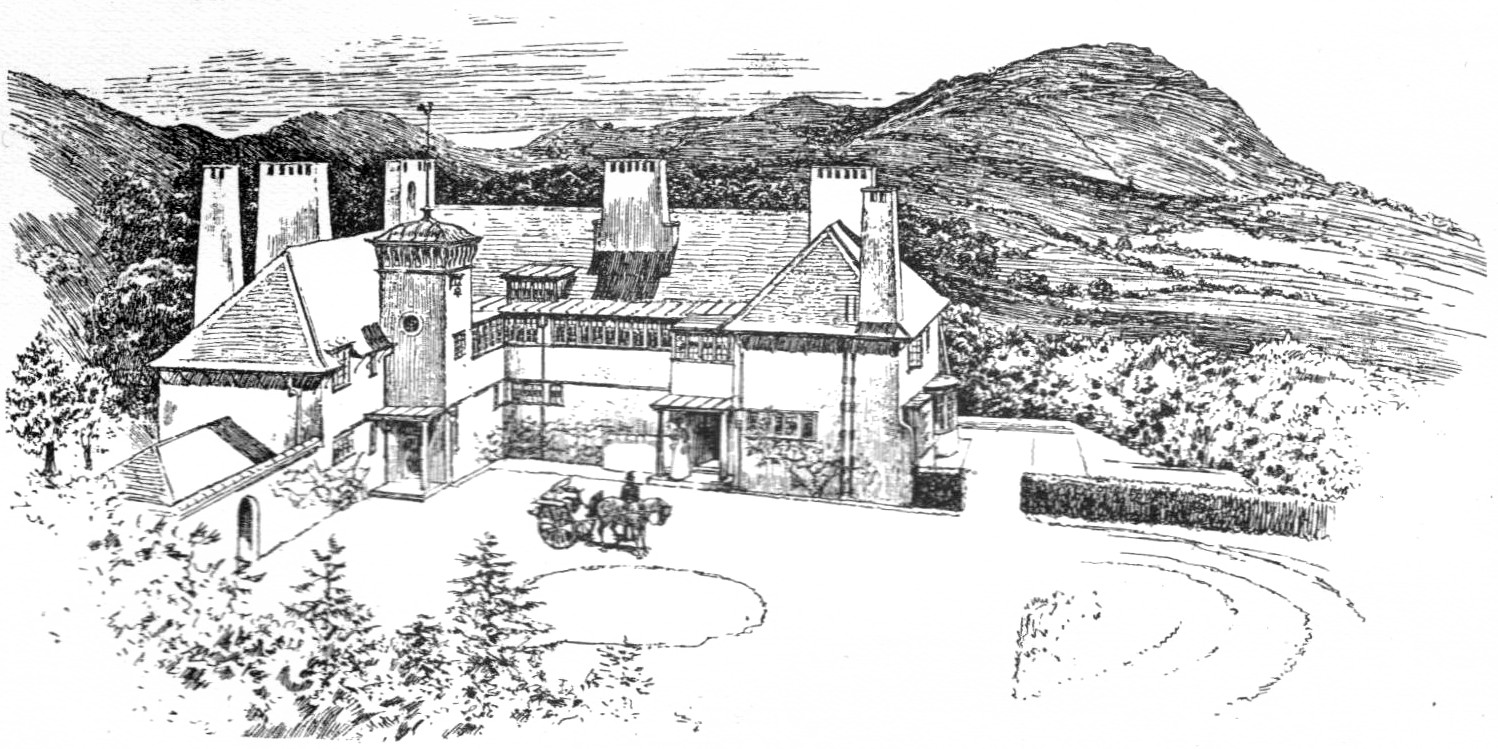
Illustration of Perrycroft from Modern Homes, 1909

== Sources ==
- Brooks, Alan; Pevsner, Nikolaus (2012). Herefordshire. The Buildings of England. New Haven, US and London: Yale University Press. ISBN 978-0-300-12575-7. OCLC 759174126.
- Cole, David (2015). The Art of CFA Voysey: English Pioneer Modernist Architect and Designer. Images Publishing. ISBN 9781864706048.
- Gilmour, Rodney (2013). Phosphoric Acid: Purification, Uses, Technology, and Economics. Boca Raton, FL: CRC Press. ISBN 978-1-4398-9516-0.
