= Stourbridge (constituency) =

UK Parliament constituency (since 1997)

Coordinates: 52.46°N 2.13°W

- Borough constituency for the House of Commons
- Boundaries since 2024
- Boundary of Stourbridge in West Midlands region
- County: West Midlands
- Electorate: 70,225 (December 2010)
- Major settlements: Amblecote, Cradley, Lye, Quarry Bank, Stourbridge, Brierley Hill

Current constituency
- Created: 1997
- Member of Parliament: Cat Eccles (Labour)
- Seats: One
- Created from: Halesowen & Stourbridge; Dudley East; Dudley West

1918–1950
- Seats: One
- Type of constituency: Borough constituency
- Created from: North Worcestershire
- Replaced by: Oldbury & Halesowen and Dudley

Stourbridge is a constituency (Note: A borough constituency (for the purposes of election expenses and type of returning officer)) in the West Midlands represented in the House of Commons of the UK Parliament since 2024 by Cat Eccles of the Labour Party.

== Constituency profile ==
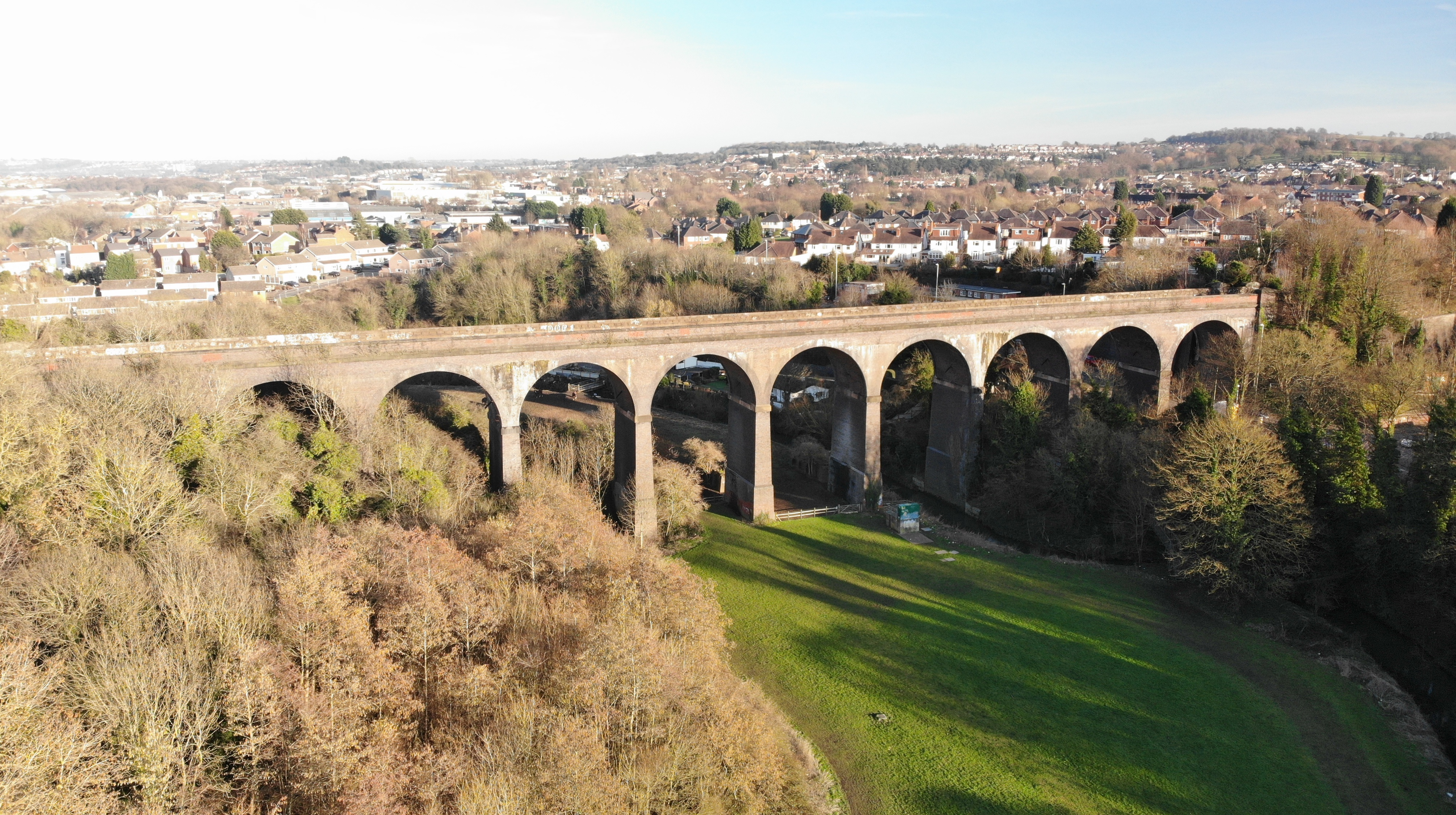
Stambermill Viaduct, Stourbridge

Stourbridge is a constituency in the West Midlands county of England. It covers the towns of Stourbridge, Lye, Brierley Hill and Netherton.

This constituency forms part of the Black Country, an area of contiguous towns to the west of Birmingham with an industrial heritage. Stourbridge was traditionally the national centre for glassmaking whilst Lye, Brierley Hill and Netherton had significant steelmaking, brickmaking and coal mining industries. Lye, Brierley Hill and Netherton were negatively affected by the deindustrialisation of the late 20th century and are still highly-deprived today; most residents of these towns live in semi-detached properties, many of which are socially rented. Stourbridge, in comparison, is mostly affluent and suburban, especially in Withymoor Village and Pedmore. House prices across the constituency are generally similar to the rest of the West Midlands region but lower than the UK average.

Stourbridge has an above-average retired population. Residents have average levels of income and homeownership but high rates of child poverty. They have low levels of education and a high proportion work in the retail and manufacturing sectors. The percentage claiming unemployment benefits is high. White people made up 87% of the population at the 2021 census.

At the local borough council, Lye and Netherton are mostly represented by the Labour Party and Stourbridge and Brierley Hill mostly by Conservatives, although Reform UK councillors were elected across the constituency at the most recent election in 2026. Voters in the Stourbridge constituency strongly supported leaving the European Union in the 2016 referendum; an estimated 64% voted in favour of Brexit compared to the UK-wide figure of 52%.

== Boundaries ==
=== Historic ===
1918–1950: The Municipal Borough of Stourbridge, the Urban Districts of Lye and Wollescote, and Oldbury, and the Rural District of Halesowen.

1997–2010: The Metropolitan Borough of Dudley wards of Amblecote, Lye and Wollescote, Norton, Pedmore and Stourbridge East, Quarry Bank and Cradley, and Wollaston and Stourbridge West.

2010–2024: The Metropolitan Borough of Dudley wards of Amblecote, Cradley and Foxcote, Lye and Wollescote, Norton, Pedmore and Stourbridge East, Quarry Bank and Dudley Wood, and Wollaston and Stourbridge Town.

=== Current ===
Under the 2023 Periodic Review of Westminster constituencies which became effective for the 2024 general election, the constituency was defined as being composed of the following (as they existed on 1 December 2020):

- The Metropolitan Borough of Dudley wards of: Amblecote; Brierley Hill; Lye and Stourbridge North; Netherton, Woodside and St. Andrews; Norton; Pedmore and Stourbridge East; Wollaston and Stourbridge Town.

The seat was subject to significant boundary changes. These entailed the loss of the areas of Cradley, Wollescote, Quarry Bank and Dudley Wood which were moved to the new constituency of Halesowen, offset by the gain of Brierley Hill, Netherton and Woodside from the abolished constituency of Dudley South.

Further to a local government boundary review in Dudley which became effective from May 2024, the constituency now comprises the following from the 2024 general election:

- The Metropolitan Borough of Dudley wards of: Amblecote; Brierley Hill & Wordsley South; Lye & Stourbridge North; Netherton & Holly Hall; Norton; Pedmore & Stourbridge East; Wollaston & Stourbridge Town.

Stourbridge is one of three constituencies principally in the Metropolitan Borough of Dudley (alongside Dudley and Halesowen), covering the south-west of the borough.

== History ==
1918–1950

Stourbridge was one of just seventeen constituencies to have a woman candidate, Mary Macarthur, to contest the 1918 general election, the first occasion some women could vote and stand in Parliamentary elections. She stood as the Labour Party candidate. Macarthur was a trades union leader and well known in the area. However the returning officer insisted she should be listed under her married name, Mrs W. C. Anderson.

During this period no ministerial roles happened to have been awarded to any of the members. Prominent members in social history include Wilfred Wellock, who wrote 13 publications, and was an early Gandhian as well as a promoter of increased localism. At the end of this period, Lord Moyle (as he became) went on to serve Oldbury and Halesowen until 1964 and in the ballot for private member's bills achieved three to legislate in respect of:

- Humane Slaughter of Horses
- Air Pollution
- Children of the divorced (custody etc.) as recommended by the Royal Commission

The constituency was abolished in 1950, with the Stourbridge West and Stourbridge East wards being incorporated into the Dudley constituency. An Eastern section of the old constituency was included in the new Oldbury and Halesowen seat.

1997–date

Since its recreation in 1997, the seat has been a bellwether, elected an MP at each general election from the party that formed the Government.

The seat's forerunner, Halesowen and Stourbridge, created in 1974, was held by a Conservative and both of its replacements, including this seat, were taken by Labour in 1997. The smaller remainder of the eastern part of the predecessor forms part of Halesowen and Rowley Regis. To compensate for the loss of these areas, Amblecote ward was brought in from the Dudley West constituency, while the Quarry Bank & Cradley ward was brought in from Dudley East.

Labour retained the seat by just above a marginal majority at the general election in 2001, and retained it again in 2005, with a new candidate, Lynda Waltho, with a marginal majority of 1% of the vote.

Margot James regained the seat for the Conservatives at the 2010 election, retaining it with increased majorities in 2015 and 2017. James had the Conservative whip withdrawn in September 2019 and, although it was restored, she did not stand at the 2019 election and fellow Conservative Suzanne Webb was elected with over 60% of the vote.

In 2024, the seat reverted back to Labour with the election of Cat Eccles with a majority of 7.7%.

In 2015, Pete Lowe, Labour's parliamentary candidate for Stourbridge had his own beer brewed. 'Born Bred Believes' was brewed by Kinver Brewery in support of his candidacy.

== Members of Parliament ==
=== MPs 1918–1950 ===
Election	Member	Party
1918	John William Wilson	Liberal
1922	Douglas Pielou	Unionist
1927 by-election	Wilfred Wellock	Labour
1931	Robert Morgan	Conservative
1945	Arthur Moyle	Labour
1950	Constituency abolished	

=== MPs since 1997 ===
Halesowen & Stourbridge, Dudley East and Dudley West prior to 1997

Election	Member	Party
1997	Debra Shipley	Labour
2005	Lynda Waltho	Labour
2010	Margot James	Conservative
2019	Margot James	Independent
2019	Suzanne Webb	Conservative
2024	Cat Eccles	Labour

== Elections ==
=== Elections in the 2020s ===
General election 2024: Stourbridge
Party	Candidate	Votes	%	±%
Labour	Cat Eccles	15,338	38.5	+9.4
Conservative	Suzanne Webb	12,265	30.8	−31.0
Reform	Richard Shaw	7,869	19.7	N/A
Green	Stephen Price	1,732	4.3	+2.3
Liberal Democrats	Chris Bramall	1,607	4.0	−1.8
Workers Party	Mohammed Ramzan	1,067	2.7	N/A
Majority		3,073	7.7	N/A
Turnout		39,878	57.1	−7.9
Labour gain from Conservative		Swing	+20.2	

=== Elections in the 2010s ===
General election 2019: Stourbridge
Party	Candidate	Votes	%	±%
Conservative	Suzanne Webb	27,534	60.3	▲5.8
Labour	Pete Lowe	13,963	30.6	▼7.7
Liberal Democrats	Chris Bramall	2,523	5.5	▲3.2
Green	Andi Mohr	1,048	2.3	▲1.3
Independent	Aaron Hudson	621	1.4	New
Majority		13,571	29.7	▲13.5
Turnout		45,689	65.4	▼1.8
Conservative hold		Swing	▲6.7	

General election 2017: Stourbridge
Party	Candidate	Votes	%	±%
Conservative	Margot James	25,706	54.5	▲8.5
Labour	Pete Lowe	18,052	38.3	▲6.8
UKIP	Glen Wilson	1,801	3.8	▼13.1
Liberal Democrats	Chris Bramall	1,083	2.3	▼1.0
Green	Andi Mohr	493	1.0	▼1.2
Majority		7,654	16.2	▲1.7
Turnout		47,855	67.2	
Conservative hold		Swing	▲0.9	

General election 2015: Stourbridge
Party	Candidate	Votes	%	±%
Conservative	Margot James	21,195	46.0	▲3.3
Labour	Pete Lowe	14,501	31.5	▼0.2
UKIP	James Carver	7,774	16.9	▲12.4
Liberal Democrats	Chris Bramall	1,538	3.3	▼13.1
Green	Christian Kiever	1,021	2.2	▲1.4
Majority		6,694	14.5	▲3.5
Turnout		46,029		
Conservative hold		Swing	▲1.8	

General election 2010: Stourbridge
Party	Candidate	Votes	%	±%
Conservative	Margot James	20,153	42.7	▲3.4
Labour	Lynda Waltho	14,989	31.7	▼10.4
Liberal Democrats	Chris Bramall	7,733	16.4	▲0.4
UKIP	Maddy Westrop	2,103	4.5	▲1.8
BNP	Robert Weale	1,696	3.6	New
Green	Will Duckworth	394	0.8	New
Independent	Alun Nicholas	166	0.4	New
Majority		5,164	11.0	N/A
Turnout		47,234	67.8	▲3.9
Conservative gain from Labour		Swing	▲6.9	

=== Elections in the 2000s ===
General election 2005: Stourbridge
Party	Candidate	Votes	%	±%
Labour	Lynda Waltho	17,089	41.0	▼6.1
Conservative	Diana Coad	16,682	40.0	▲2.4
Liberal Democrats	Chris Bramall	6,850	16.4	▲4.3
UKIP	Daniel Mau	1,087	2.6	▲0.7
Majority		407	1.0	▼8.5
Turnout		41,708	64.7	▲2.9
Labour hold		Swing	▼4.3	

General election 2001: Stourbridge
Party	Candidate	Votes	%	±%
Labour	Debra Shipley	18,823	47.1	▼0.1
Conservative	Stephen Eyre	15,011	37.6	▲1.8
Liberal Democrats	Chris Bramall	4,833	12.1	▼2.2
UKIP	John Knotts	763	1.9	New
Socialist Labour	Mick Atherton	494	1.2	New
Majority		3,812	9.5	▼1.9
Turnout		39,924	61.8	▼14.7
Labour hold		Swing		

=== Elections in the 1990s ===
General election 1997: Stourbridge
Party	Candidate	Votes	%	±%
Labour	Debra Shipley	23,452	47.2	▲8.9
Conservative	Warren Hawksley	17,807	35.8	▼13.0
Liberal Democrats	Chris Bramall	7,123	14.3	▲2.5
Referendum	Peter Quick	1,319	2.7	New
Majority		5,645	11.4	N/A
Turnout		49,701	76.5	
Labour win (new seat)				

=== Elections in the 1940s ===
General election 1945: Stourbridge Electorate 97,095
Party	Candidate	Votes	%	±%
Labour	Arthur Moyle	34,912	48.5	▲14.2
Conservative	Robert Morgan	18,979	26.3	▼17.2
Liberal	Ralph Brown	18,159	25.2	▲3.0
Majority		15,933	22.2	N/A
Turnout		72,050	74.2	▲3.3
Labour gain from Conservative		Swing		

General Election 1939–40: Another general election was required to take place before the end of 1940. The political parties had been making preparations for an election to take place from 1939 and by the end of this year, the following candidates had been selected;

- Conservative: Robert Morgan
- Liberal: Ralph Brown
- Labour: Wilfred Wellock

=== Elections in the 1930s ===
General election 1935: Stourbridge Electorate 80,598
Party	Candidate	Votes	%	±%
Conservative	Robert Morgan	24,898	43.5	▲4.2
Labour	Wilfred Wellock	19,597	34.3	▲1.5
Liberal	Donald Finnemore	12,684	22.2	▼5.8
Majority		5,301	9.2	▲2.7
Turnout		57,179	70.9	▼11.1
Conservative hold		Swing		

General election 1931: Stourbridge Electorate 70,324
Party	Candidate	Votes	%	±%
Conservative	Robert Morgan	22,652	39.3	▲7.5
Labour	Wilfred Wellock	18,910	32.8	▼5.6
Liberal	Donald Finnemore	16,121	28.0	▼1.8
Majority		3,742	6.5	N/A
Turnout		57,683	82.0	
Conservative gain from Labour		Swing	▲6.5	

=== Elections in the 1920s ===
General election 1929: Stourbridge
Party	Candidate	Votes	%	±%
Labour	Wilfred Wellock	21,343	38.4	▲3.6
Unionist	Stanley Reed	17,675	31.8	▼7.7
Liberal	Donald Finnemore	16,537	29.8	▲4.1
Majority		3,668	6.6	N/A
Turnout		55,555		
Labour gain from Conservative		Swing		

1927 Stourbridge by-election
Party	Candidate	Votes	%	±%
Labour	Wilfred Wellock	16,561	41.9	▲7.1
Unionist	Henry Hogbin	13,462	34.0	▼5.5
Liberal	Aneurin Edwards	9,535	24.1	▼1.6
Majority		3,099	7.9	N/A
Turnout		39,558		
Labour gain from Unionist		Swing		

General election 1924: Stourbridge
Party	Candidate	Votes	%	±%
Unionist	Douglas Pielou	16,023	39.5	−0.3
Labour	Wilfred Wellock	14,113	34.8	+10.4
Liberal	Geoffrey Mander	10,418	25.7	−10.1
Majority		1,910	4.7	+0.7
Turnout		40,554		
Unionist hold		Swing		

General election 1923: Stourbridge
Party	Candidate	Votes	%	±%
Unionist	Douglas Pielou	14,764	39.8	−12.0
Liberal	Harry Palfrey	13,269	35.8	−12.4
Labour	Wilfred Wellock	9,050	24.4	New
Majority		1,495	4.0	+0.4
Turnout		37,083		
Unionist hold		Swing		

General election 1922: Stourbridge
Party	Candidate	Votes	%	±%
Unionist	Douglas Pielou	18,200	51.8	New
Liberal	John William Wilson	16,949	48.2	▲9.7
Majority		1,251	3.6	N/A
Turnout		35,149		
Unionist gain from Liberal		Swing		

=== Elections in the 1910s ===
General election 1918: Stourbridge
Party		Candidate	Votes	%	±%
	Liberal	John Wilson	8,920	38.5	
	Labour	Mary Macarthur	7,587	32.7	
C	National Democratic	Victor Fisher	6,690	28.8	
Majority			1,333	5.8	
Turnout			23,197	55.0	
	Liberal win (new seat)				
C indicates candidate endorsed by the coalition government.

== See also ==
- List of parliamentary constituencies in the West Midlands (county)
- List of parliamentary constituencies in West Midlands (region)

== Sources ==
- Craig, F. W. S. (1983) [1969]. British parliamentary election results 1918–1949 (3rd ed.). Chichester: Parliamentary Research Services. p. 503. ISBN 0-900178-06-X.
