= Lynda Waltho =

British Labour politician

Member of Parliament for Stourbridge
- In office 5 May 2005 – 12 April 2010
- Preceded by: Debra Shipley
- Succeeded by: Margot James

Personal details
- Born: 22 May 1960 (age 66) London, England, UK
- Party: Labour
- Education: Keele University
- Profession: Politician

Lynda Ellen Waltho (née Abbott; born 22 May 1960) is a British Labour Party politician who was the Member of Parliament (MP) for Stourbridge from 2005 to 2010, succeeding Labour MP Debra Shipley, who had stepped down due to ill-health just days before the 2005 election was called. At the 2010 election, the Conservative candidate Margot James took the seat.

== Early life and career ==
Waltho was born in London, the daughter of Charles and Eunice Abbott, and educated at Keele University. She gained a PGCE from the University of Central England, subsequently working as a teacher in Birmingham, Sandwell and Dudley Local Education Authorities from 1981 to 1994.

From 1995 to 1997, she was an assistant to Labour MEP Simon Murphy, and from 1997 to 2001, to Labour MP Sylvia Heal. Waltho was the Agent for the West Midlands Regional Labour Party from 2001 to 2004, and worked as principal advisor to Neena Gill MEP from 2004 to 2005. She is a member of the GMB trade union. Her special interests include education, childcare and the economy.

== Parliamentary career ==
In November 2005, she was appointed Parliamentary Private Secretary to David Hanson MP, Minister of State in the Northern Ireland Office, remaining in this role until 2007. This made her the first Labour member first elected in 2005 to hold any government role. From 2007 until 2010, Waltho was at the Ministry of Justice, and PPS to the Prisons Minister from 2007 to 2008. She also became a member of the Children, Schools and Skills Select Committee. In September 2008, Waltho joined the Government as Assistant Regional Minister for the West Midlands.

She served as an important member of several All Party Parliamentary Groups:

- Chairman: Alcohol Misuse
- Chairman: Animal Welfare
- Chairman: Libraries, Literacy and Information Management
- Vice Chairman: Heart Disease
- Treasurer: Waterways Group

At the 2010 election, Waltho lost her seat to the Conservatives, in an election which saw Labour lose power after 13 years in government.

== After Parliament ==
Waltho became Head of Public Affairs for the Green Bus Company in 2010, and from 2012 to 2015, was Managing Director of Clearvu Communications. Since 2016, Waltho has been Director of the Midlands Confederation of Passenger Transport.

In April 2019, Waltho announced that she was seeking the Labour Party nomination as their candidate in the 2020 election (later postponed to 2021 owing to the Coronavirus pandemic) for the position of Mayor of the West Midlands Combined Authority, which was held by Conservative Andy Street. However, a family illness the following June intervened, and she felt she had to stand aside.

== Personal life ==
Waltho was married to Stephen J. Waltho until 2014, and has two sons.

In 2026, she married her long-term partner, former Labour MP Lord Peter Snape. He died in August 2026.

Parliament of the United Kingdom
Preceded by Debra Shipley	Member of Parliament for Stourbridge; 2005 – 2010	Succeeded by Margot James
