= Roland Moyle =

British politician

Roland Moyle PC

Minister of State, Health and Social Security
- In office 10 September 1976 – 4 May 1979
- Prime Minister: James Callaghan
- Preceded by: David Owen
- Succeeded by: Gerard Vaughan

Minister of State, Northern Ireland
- In office 27 June 1974 – 10 September 1976
- Prime Minister: Harold Wilson; James Callaghan
- Succeeded by: Peter Mond

Parliamentary Secretary to Agriculture, Fisheries and Food
- In office 11 March 1974 – 27 June 1974
- Prime Minister: Harold Wilson
- Preceded by: Robert Shirley
- Succeeded by: Edward Bishop

Member of Parliament for Lewisham East Lewisham North (1966–1974)
- In office 31 March 1966 – 9 June 1983
- Preceded by: Christopher Chataway
- Succeeded by: Colin Moynihan

Personal details
- Born: Roland Dunstan Moyle; 12 March 1928
- Died: 14 July 2017 (aged 89)
- Party: Labour
- Parent: Arthur Moyle (father)
- Education: University College of Wales, Aberystwyth; Trinity Hall, Cambridge
- Occupation: Barrister

Roland Dunstan Moyle PC (12 March 1928 – 14 July 2017) was a British Labour politician.

== Early life ==
Moyle was born in March 1928. His father was Arthur Moyle who was a Labour Member of Parliament and served as Parliamentary Private Secretary to Clement Attlee. Moyle was educated in Bexleyheath and Llanidloes, and at the University College of Wales, Aberystwyth and Trinity Hall, Cambridge, where he chaired the Labour Club in 1953.

He became a barrister, called to the bar by Gray's Inn in 1954. He was an industrial relations consultant and worked as secretary of the National Joint Industrial Council to the Gas Industry, and National Joint Council in Gas Staffs from 1956 and the sister body in the electrical industry from 1965. He served as a councillor in the London Borough of Greenwich from 1964 and was president of Greenwich Labour Party.

== Member of Parliament ==
Moyle was elected Member of Parliament for Lewisham North in 1966, and after boundary changes, for Lewisham East in 1974.

After a spell as Parliamentary Secretary to the Ministry of Agriculture, Fisheries and Food, he was Minister of State for Northern Ireland from 1974 to 1976, and Minister of Health from 1976 to 1979. Privy counsellor 1978.

In Labour's landslide general election defeat of 1983, Moyle lost his seat to the Conservative Colin Moynihan.

== Later life and death ==
Moyle later became deputy chairman of the police complaints authority from 1985 to 1991.

He died on 14 July 2017 at the age of 89.

Parliament of the United Kingdom
Preceded by Christopher Chataway	Member of Parliament for Lewisham North; 1966 – February 1974	Constituency abolished
New constituency	Member of Parliament for Lewisham East; February 1974 – 1983	Succeeded by Colin Moynihan
