= Suzanne Webb =

British politician (born 1966)

Suzanne Webb OBE
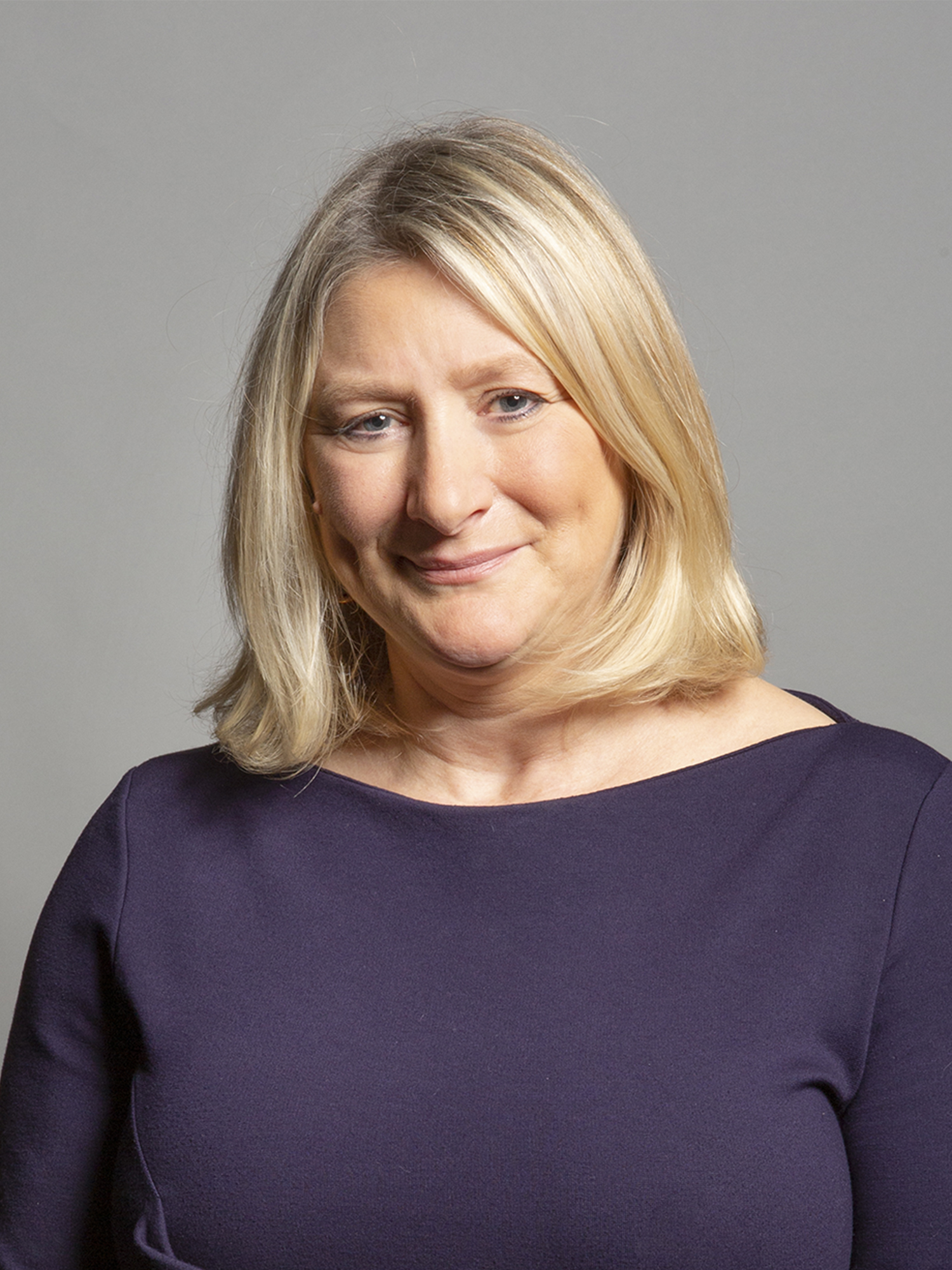
- Official portrait, 2019

Assistant Government Whip
- In office 14 November 2023 – 5 July 2024
- Prime Minister: Rishi Sunak

Parliamentary Private Secretary to the Prime Minister
- In office 6 September 2022 – 25 October 2022
- Prime Minister: Liz Truss
- Preceded by: Alexander Stafford
- Succeeded by: Craig Williams

Member of Parliament for Stourbridge
- In office 12 December 2019 – 30 May 2024
- Preceded by: Margot James
- Succeeded by: Cat Eccles

Personal details
- Born: 4 February 1966 (age 60) Sutton Coldfield, England
- Party: Conservative
- Website: Official website

Suzanne Webb OBE (born 4 February 1966) is a British Conservative Party politician who served as the Parliamentary Private Secretary to Prime Minister Liz Truss from September to October 2022. She was the Member of Parliament (MP) for Stourbridge from 2019 to 2024.

== Early life and career ==
Webb was born in Sutton Coldfield. Prior to becoming an MP, she worked for a global logistics provider for 29 years, most recently in a senior leadership role.

== Early political career ==
Webb voted for the UK to remain in the European Union in the 2016 referendum, although she became a supporter of Brexit after the referendum.

Webb was elected as a Conservative Party councillor for the Castle Vale ward on Birmingham City Council on 3 May 2018. Her term of office expired in 2022. She had previously stood as the Conservative candidate for the Sutton Vesey ward in 2016. She also stood as a candidate in the 2019 European Parliament elections for the West Midlands.

As part of the Conservative voluntary party, Webb was the Coventry, Birmingham, and Solihull Area Chairman between 2017 and 2019. In 2019, Webb was elected as the West Midlands Regional Chairman. She was also part of the Andy Street Campaign Team for the 2017 West Midlands mayoral election.

In November 2019, Webb was adopted as the candidate for Stourbridge after the incumbent, Margot James, announced that she would not be contesting the forthcoming election. The seat, which had been held by the Conservatives since 2010, was held by Webb.

== Parliamentary career ==
She was appointed Parliamentary Private Secretary in the Department for International Trade and Women and Equalities, serving under Liz Truss, in June 2020.

In September 2021, Webb was appointed Parliamentary Private Secretary to Secretary of State for Defence Ben Wallace.

From 8 July to 7 September 2022, she was an Assistant Government Whip in a role attached to the Ministry of Defence.

On 7 September 2022, Webb was appointed as the Parliamentary Private Secretary to the Prime Minister, Liz Truss.

In November 2023, she was appointed Assistant Government Whip in the Sunak ministry.

In the 2024 General Election, she lost her seat to Labour Party candidate Cat Eccles.

== Honours ==
Webb was appointed Officer of the Order of the British Empire (OBE) on 29 December 2023 in Truss's resignation honours list. She received the honour insignia at Windsor Castle on 26 May 2024.

Parliament of the United Kingdom
Preceded by Margot James	Member of Parliament for Stourbridge; 2019–2024	Succeeded by Cat Eccles
Preceded by Alexander Stafford	Parliamentary Private Secretary to the Prime Minister; 2022	Succeeded by Craig Williams
