= Donald Finnemore =

British judge (1889–1974)

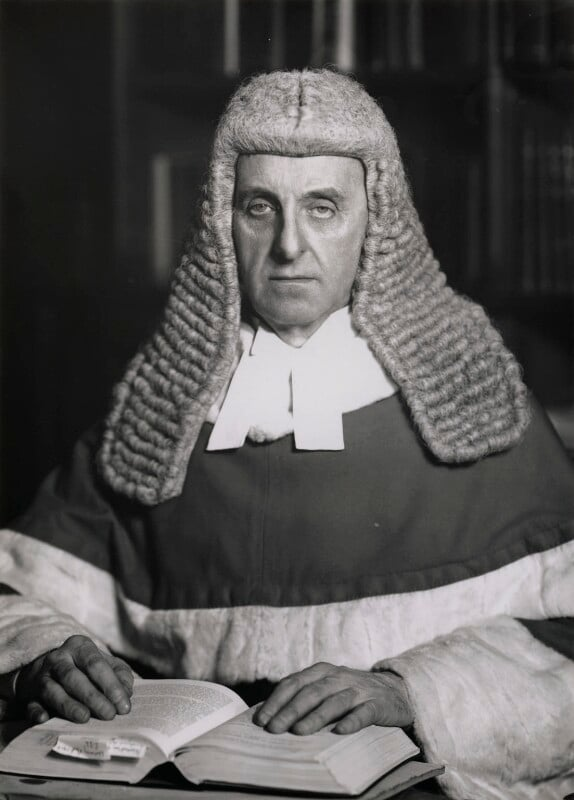
Finnemore in 1951

Sir Donald Leslie Finnemore (13 June 1889 – 10 May 1974), was a British judge and Liberal Party politician. He was a committed Baptist and Teetotaller who was an active supporter of the Boys' Brigade.

== Background ==
He was the son of William and Kate Finnemore. He was a grandson of John Skirrow Wright Liberal MP for Nottingham. He was educated at King Edward's School, Birmingham and Pembroke College, Oxford (Scholar). He was awarded a First Class in Jurisprudence and Proxime accessit for the Vinerian Law Scholarship at Oxford. He served in France as British Red Cross Officer from 1916 to 1919.

== Legal career ==
He was called by Inner Temple (Prize for Constitutional Law and Legal History) in 1914 and worked on the Midland Circuit. In 1930, he was involved in the so-called Blazing Car murder case. as defending counsel for Alfred Rouse, who was convicted of the murder of an unknown man and hanged. The Crown was represented by his longtime friend and colleague Norman Birkett. He was Honorary Legal Adviser to the Midland Regional Commissioner for Civil Defence, 1940–45. He was Chairman of the Midland Conscientious Objectors Tribunal, 1940–47. The actor Paul Eddington in his memoir recounts his appearance before Finnemore, who accepted Eddington's application for conscientious objector status. He was a County Court Judge (North Staffs and Birmingham) 1940–44, (Wolverhampton, etc.) 1944–46 and (Birmingham) 1946–47. He was a Member of the Matrimonial (Trial in Provinces) Committee, 1942–43. He was Probate, Divorce, and Admiralty, 1947–48. He was Judge of the High Court (Queen's Bench Division), 1948–64, during which time he presided over the trial of the serial killer John Christie in 1953. He was Chairman Warwickshire Quarter Sessions, 1950–71. He was a Member, of the Criminal Law Revision Committee, from 1965. He served as a Justice of the Peace in Warwickshire.

== Political career ==
He was Liberal candidate for the Sparkbrook Division of Birmingham at the 1923 General Election. The constituency was not a good prospect for the Liberal Party, and he came third. He did not contest the 1924 General election. He then was Liberal candidate for the Stourbridge Division of Worcestershire at the 1929 General Election. The Liberal Party had not won the seat since 1918 and at the previous contest, the 1927 Stourbridge by-election, the Liberal had finished third. He was able to increase the party vote share;

General Election, 30 May 1929: Stourbridge Electorate: 66,145
Party	Candidate	Votes	%	±%
Labour	Wilfred Wellock	21,343	38.4	−3.5
Conservative	Sir Herbert Stanley Reed	17,675	31.8	−2.2
Liberal	Donald Leslie Finnemore	16,537	29.8	+5.7
Majority		3,668		
Turnout				
Labour hold		Swing		

He was again Liberal candidate for the Stourbridge Division of Worcestershire at the 1931 General Election. The election followed the formation of the National Government and there was a national swing to the Conservatives that was reflected in Stourbridge, where Labour lost the seat. However, Finnemore had managed to retain much of the vote he won in 1929, though he still finished third. He was Liberal candidate for the third time at the Stourbridge Division of Worcestershire at the 1935 General Election. He again finished third and this time saw his vote squeezed a bit by the other two parties. This was his final attempt to enter parliament.

He became a Life Governor of Birmingham University in 1945 (Hon. LLD 1966), a Governor of King Edward's School in 1946 and an Honorary Fellow of Pembroke College in 1948. In 1947 he was knighted. He was President of the Baptist Union of Great Britain, 1966–67.
