= C. F. A. Voysey =

British architect and designer (1857–1941)

C. F. A. Voysey FRIBA RDI
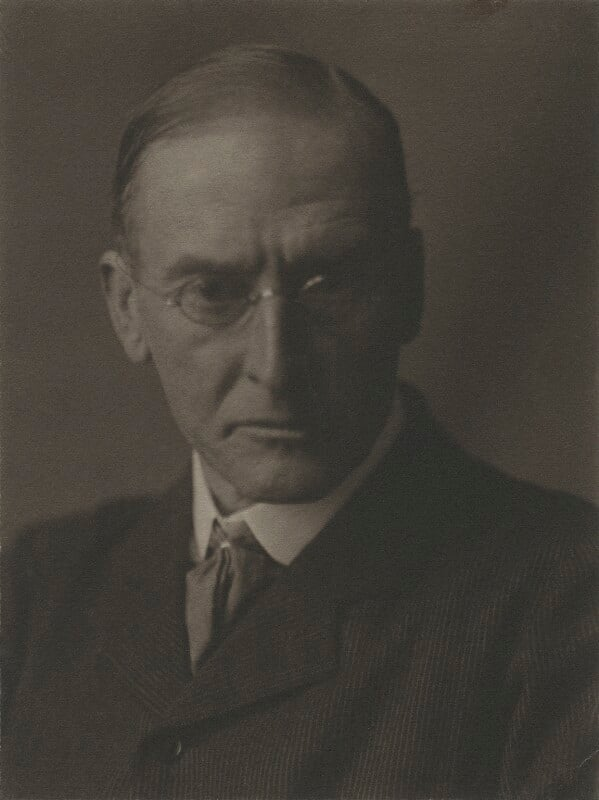
- Voysey in the 1920s
- Born: Charles Francis Annesley Voysey; 28 May 1857; Hessle, Yorkshire, England
- Died: 12 February 1941 (aged 83); Winchester, England
- Occupation: Architect
- Awards: RSA Royal Designers for Industry, 1938 RIBA Gold Medal, 1940
- Buildings: Broad Leys, Windermere, Cumbria (1898); Norney Grange, nr Shackleford, Surrey (1897); Perrycroft, Colwall, Malvern (1893–94); The Whitwood Institute, Whitwood, Castleford (1904)
- Design: designer of textiles and furniture

Charles Francis Annesley Voysey FRIBA RDI (28 May 1857 – 12 February 1941) was an English architect and furniture and textile designer. Voysey's early work was as a designer of wallpapers, fabrics and furnishings in a Arts and Crafts style and he made important contribution to the Modern Style (British Art Nouveau style), and was recognized by the seminal The Studio magazine. He is renowned as the architect of several country houses.

He was one of the first people to understand and appreciate the significance of industrial design. He has been considered one of the pioneers of Modern Architecture, a notion which he rejected. His English domestic architecture draws heavily on vernacular rather than academic tradition, influenced by the ideas of Herbert Tudor Buckland (1869–1951) and Augustus Pugin (1812–1852).

A part of the Sanderson wallpaper factory (1901) in Chiswick, which he designed, is named Voysey House in his memory.

== Education ==
Born at Kingston College, at Hessle, Yorkshire on 28 May 1857, he was the eldest son of Rev. Charles Voysey, a Church of England priest who was deprived of his living in 1871 for his heterodox views. The family moved to London where his father founded the Theistic Church. Voysey was educated by his father, then briefly at Dulwich College.

In 1874 Voysey was articled for five years to the architect J. P. Seddon, with whom he subsequently remained a further year as chief assistant. From Seddon Voysey learnt the 'Gothic' principles of design first propounded by A. W. N. Pugin: elevations should grow naturally out of the requirements of the plan and only 'honest' construction should be used. Seddon and Voysey both believed in following these principles of design without slavishly copying Gothic styles. But, however freely Seddon interpreted the Gothic styles, his work remained discernibly Gothic, whereas Voysey's mature work eliminated all trace of period styles. Voysey followed Seddon in believing, like Pugin, that it was the business of an architect to make designs not only for buildings but also for the allied crafts.

In 1879 Voysey spent a brief period as assistant to the architect Henry Saxon Snell (1830–1904), and from 1880 to 1881 he worked as an assistant in the office of George Devey, who was a follower of his father's Theistic Church. There he gained valuable site experience, and would have encountered Devey's skill as a watercolourist and his considerable knowledge of English vernacular architecture. In 1881 or early 1882 Voysey set up his own practice in London.

== Design ==
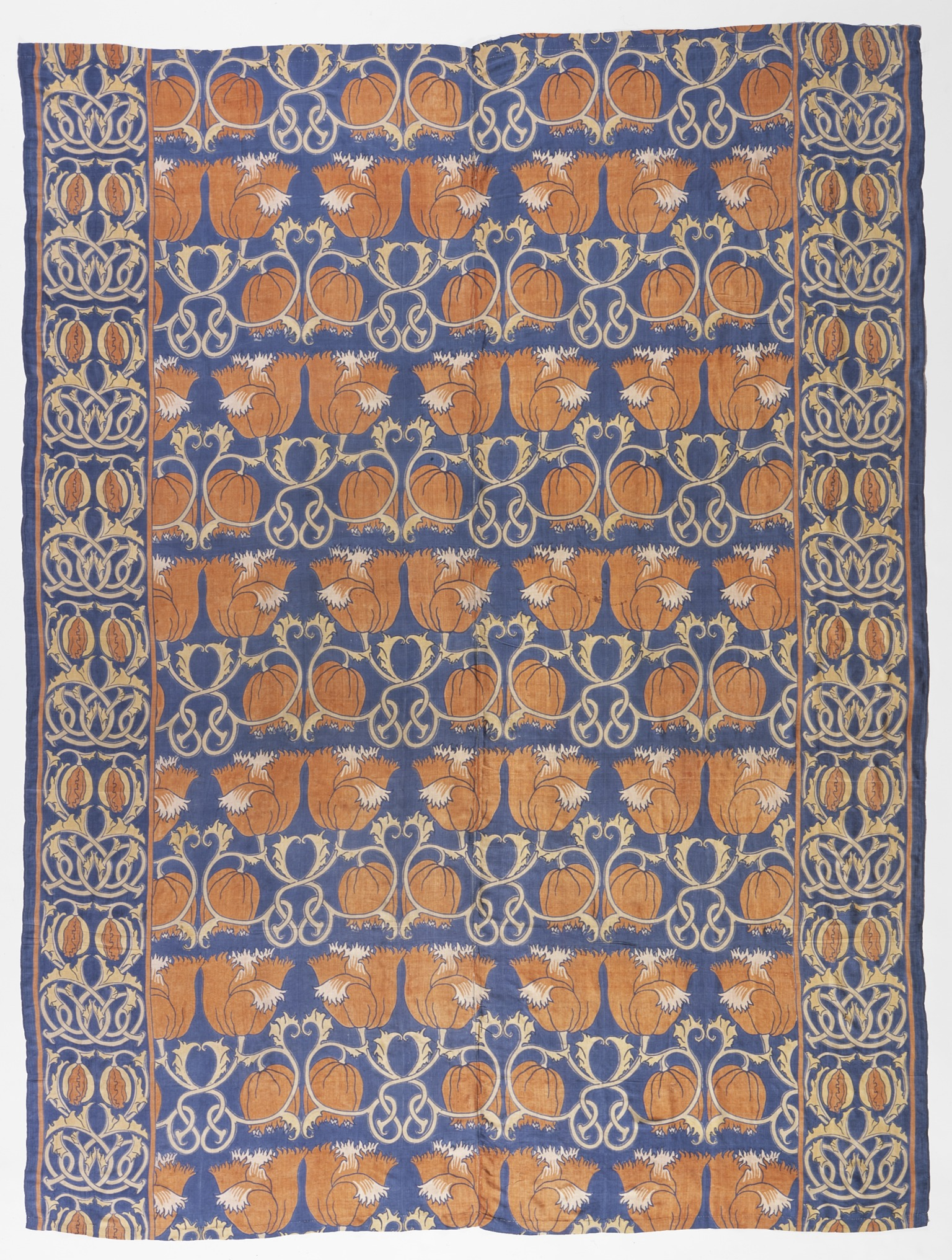
Textile design circa 1888

Voysey's designs in the field of applied art included furniture, wallpapers, fabrics, carpets, tiles, metalwork, ceramics and graphic design. Sometimes he designed artefacts specially for his own buildings, and sometimes he sold designs to manufacturers for wider use.

Voysey's development as a furniture designer corresponded to his development as an architect, and by c.1895 he had evolved a definitive personal style. His furniture conformed, with a few exceptions, to this style until 1910, when he began to introduce greater elaboration, including Gothic motifs, into his designs. The simple elegance of Voysey's furniture from the period 1895–1910 was achieved by relying on the innate beauty of high quality materials, especially unpolished oak, and by eschewing complicated decoration in favour of a careful balance of the vertical and horizontal elements in a design.

The vertical elements were often emphasised by tapering the vertical supports from a square to an octagonal section and by carrying corner supports up above the functionally necessary height; the horizontal elements were often emphasised by simply moulded cornices, by circular caps on the tops of corner supports (a motif borrowed from Arthur Heygate Mackmurdo) and by long strap-hinges made of unpolished bronze.

Voysey was a distinguished designer of flat patterns for wallpapers, fabrics, carpets and tiles. It was Mackmurdo who first introduced him to the techniques of wallpaper design, and some of Voysey's early pattern designs incorporated more restrained versions of the swirling motifs beloved by Mackmurdo and the Century guild of artists. Voysey sold his first wallpaper design in 1883; by the late 1880s his reputation as a wallpaper designer was established at home and abroad, and he was still selling pattern designs in 1930. His career as a pattern designer was thus longer and more prolific than his career as an architect. But it was also complementary to his architectural career, because selling patterns supplemented his income in the lean years of his architectural practice, before c. 1895 and after c. 1910.

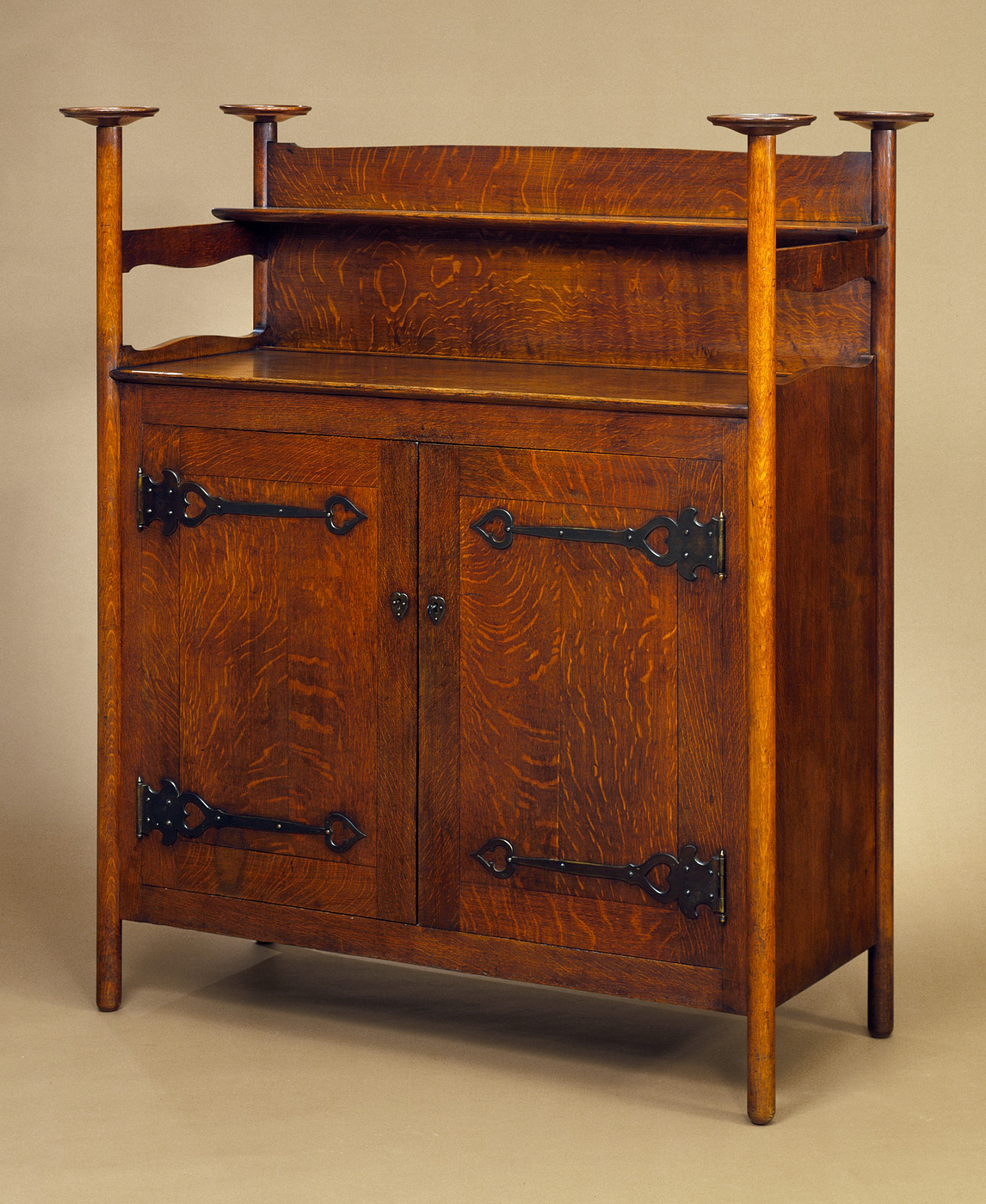
A sideboard by Voysey, Nielsen, Elsley and Company, Ltd

Many of Voysey's pattern designs rely for their effect on rhythmically contrasted shapes consisting of areas of flat, clear colour, usually bounded by dark or pale outlines. This is in the tradition of oriental design praised by Victorian reformers of design, such as Owen Jones and Matthew Digby Wyatt. In Voysey's work stylised natural forms, especially plants and birds, often represent the positive shapes, and areas of background form the contrasting negative shapes. This skilful juxtaposition can also be seen in his handling of the solids and voids in his designs for two-dimensional metalwork, such as ventilator grilles and hinges. Some of Voysey's pattern designs after c. 1900 consist of motifs placed in comparative isolation against a light ground. The use of scale is arbitrary, giving an effect of naive charm reminiscent of medieval illuminations and tapestries. The later designs are generally smaller and more delicately coloured than the designs of the 1880s and 1890s.

At the suggestion of his friend A. H. Mackmurdo, Voysey began designing wallpapers in 1883 under contract for Jeffrey & Co while waiting for architectural commissions to come in. He joined the Art-Workers' Guild in 1884, and displayed both printed textiles and wallpapers at the inaugural Arts and Crafts Exhibition Society show at the New Gallery in 1888. In 1893 he began designing wallpapers for Essex & Co., for whom he executed several hundred patterns.

Distinct stages can be identified in Voysey's wallpaper and textile designs. His earliest works, through the late 1880s, have historically influenced traditional repeats. By the mid-1890s, he was creating his most characteristic and original designs, flowing patterns in pastel colourways with flattened silhouettes of birds, florals, and hearts. Designs were used for both wallpaper and textiles, which were often executed as wool double cloths for furnishing.

Typical patterns of this period include The Saladin wallpaper, 1897 and The Owl jacquard-woven woollen textile, 1898. From 1910 onwards, his patterns became more narrative, with isolated motifs, and were often meant for the nursery. The Alice in Wonderland furnishing fabric, c.1920, is typical of this phase. His last recorded wallpaper commission was dated 1930.

In 1896, The Studio confirmed Voysey's place in the decorative arts, writing "Now a 'Voysey wall-paper' sounds almost as familiar as a 'Morris chintz' or a 'Liberty silk'." Voysey also designed for Donegal Carpets and many other firms over a fifty-year career in design.

== Architectural work ==
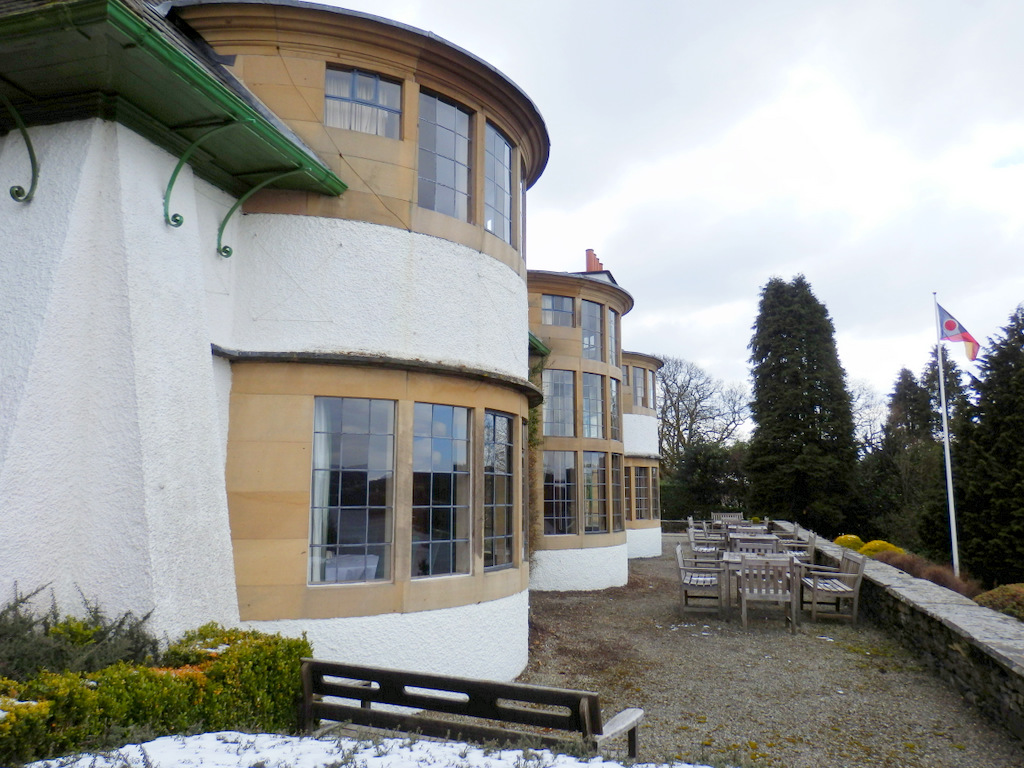
Broad Leys, Windermere

Voysey's first design was for a house at Loughton for Octavius Dixie Deacon. A house was erected on the site, but whether it bore any relation to Voysey's design is not known. By 1894, Voysey had moved his practice to Melina Place, St John's Wood, London, next door to the influential Arts and Crafts architect Edward Schroeder Prior, resulting in the development of a long term friendship and exchange of ideas between the two men.

Voysey's architectural practice began slowly, with small alterations and surveys; a number of unexecuted designs from these early years were published and reveal the influence of both Seddon and Devey. In 1888, he obtained his first architectural commission, for The Cottage (addition by Voysey, 1900) at Bishop's Itchington, Warwicks. The Cottage was built of thin, buttressed brickwork, roughcast and painted cream.

That form of construction was chosen by Voysey because it was cheap, but in his hands it became an aesthetic end in itself, as he skilfully juxtaposed the solid and void, light and shadow, of the clean-cut forms. Other 19th century architects, including Devey, had built country cottages in a simple vernacular style with whitened roughcast for estate workers, parsons and schoolmasters. For 1888, The Cottage was unusual not only for being entirely roughcast, but also for its simplicity and informality, which were revolutionary in a gentleman's house.

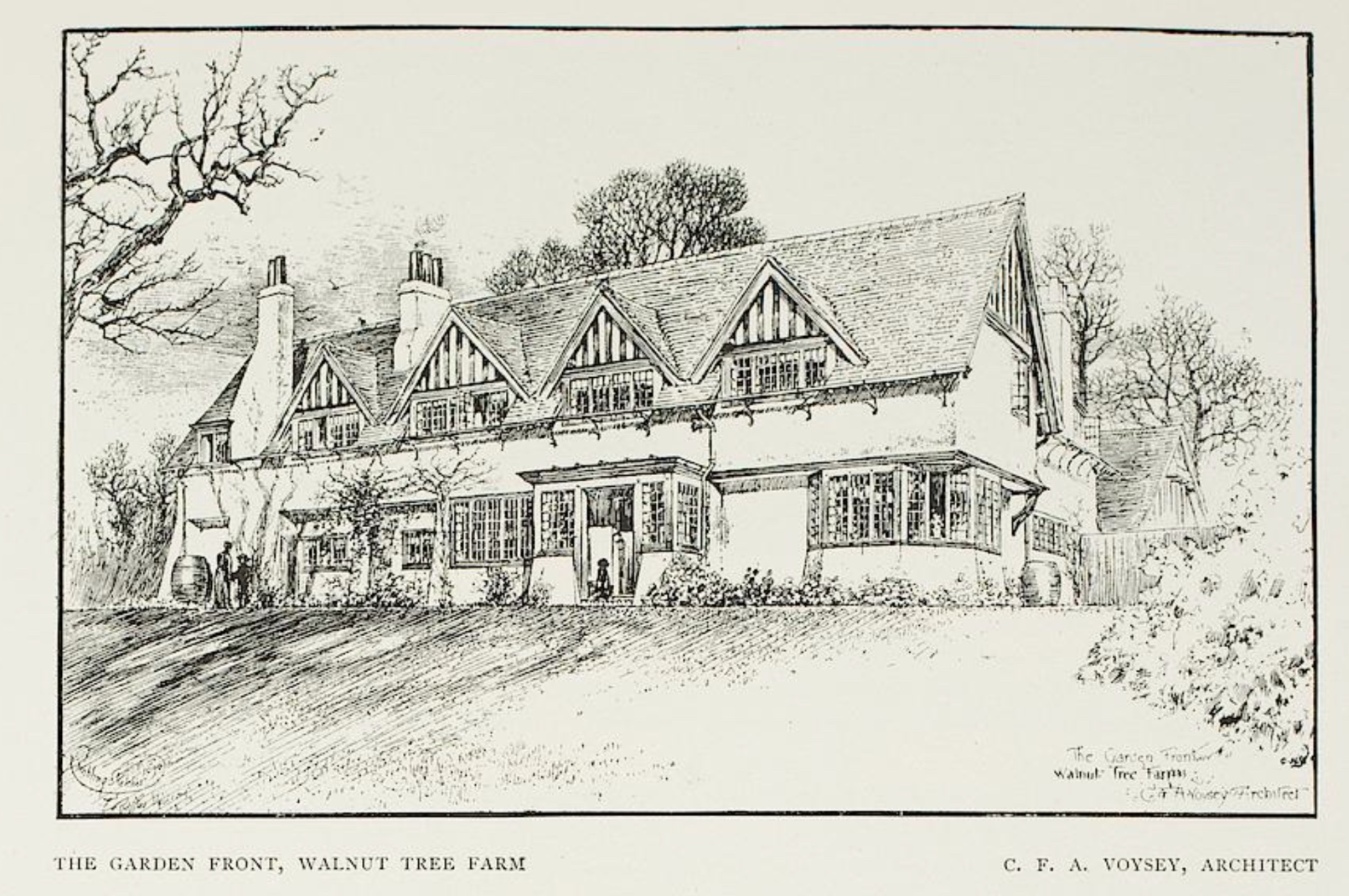
The garden front of Walnut Tree Farm

Walnut Tree Farm (1890) at Castlemorton, near Malvern, Worcestershire, and a house at Bedford Park (1891), Chiswick, west London, have certain novel features that became characteristic of Voysey's designs. Walnut Tree Farm shows for the first time the lively colouring that was to become typical of his houses: whitened roughcast, bright green exterior woodwork, oversize, bright green water-butts, bright green tubs of bay trees and bright red curtains at the windows. At Bedford Park the innovation consisted of very simplified classical or Queen Anne details, a slate roof, and practical metal frames and stone surrounds of the windows.

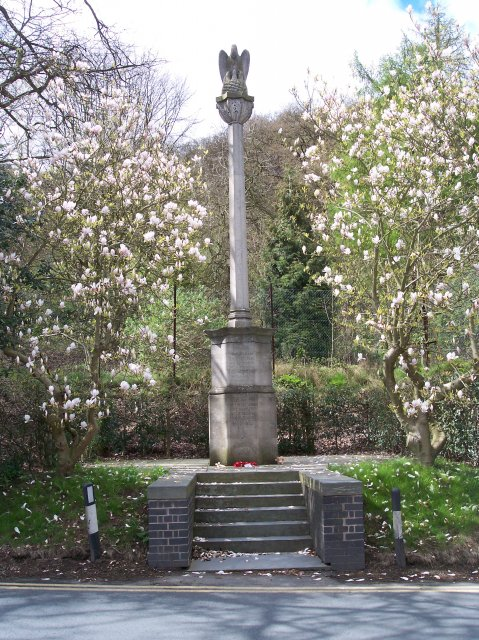
Voysey's Malvern Wells War Memorial was unveiled in 1920.

In 1893, Voysey obtained his first commission for a relatively expensive house, Perrycroft, at Colwall, near Malvern. From then until 1910, Voysey received a steady stream of architectural commissions; most were simple, white country or suburban houses with low, spreading lines, for which he became famous. He introduced some mannered, even eccentric, classical detailing into two fairly expensive houses in Surrey, designed in 1897: New Place, near Haslemere, and Norney Grange, near Shackleford. But there was a return to simplicity at Broad Leys and Moorcrag, the lakeside houses near Windermere that he designed in 1898.

Between 1900 and 1910, Voysey obtained a series of commissions that gave him the opportunity to design complete houses, including every detail of the interiors, not only fixtures, but also movable furniture, carpets, curtains and wall coverings. The Orchard, Chorleywood, Hertfordshire, designed for himself and his wife in 1899, was the first such house. In 1901 came The Pastures at North Luffenham, Rutland; in 1905 Holly Mount, near Beaconsfield, Bucks, and The Homestead at Frinton-on-Sea, Essex. He also designed Ty Bronna in Cardiff.

An interior design carried out in London was Garden Corner (1906) on the Chelsea Embankment. In the typical Voysey interior, the low ceilings and deep friezes were white, and the woodwork was unpolished oak, if possible, or cheaper deal, painted white. Colours in furnishings, tiled fireplaces and wall and floor coverings were soft and light, for example delicate greens and heathery purples, with a few bright accents of red and turquoise. There was no clutter in a Voysey interior: furniture was sparse and the use of pattern in wallpapers, carpets and metalwork was sparing.

From c. 1910, Voysey's architectural practice declined, largely because he was out of sympathy with the new fashion for classical forms. He reacted against that by introducing details of Gothic origin into his work. In 1909, he used a pointed arch in the porch of Brooke End at Henley-in-Arden, Warwickshire, and in the same year he built a miniature courtyard house in Tudor Gothic style at Combe Down, near Bath. Unexecuted designs of 1914 for larger houses have eccentric courtyard plans, pointed arches, crenellations and towers.

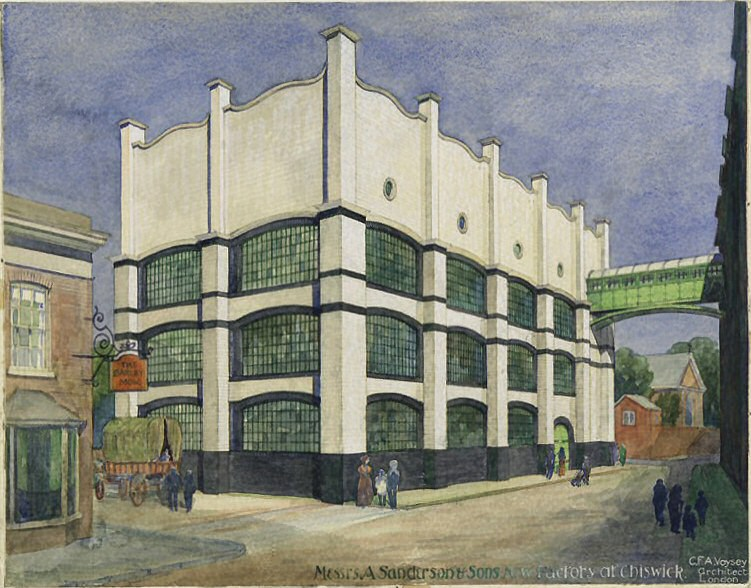
Sanderson wallpaper factory design, Chiswick, 1902; the building is now known as Voysey House.

Voysey only occasionally obtained commissions for buildings other than country or suburban houses, but when he did he displayed considerable versatility. On the restricted site of his Bedford Park house, he abandoned his usual horizontal planning and built a "tower house". The two brick-faced terrace houses (1891) that he built in Hans Road, Knightsbridge, London, display great ingenuity in the arrangement of plan and section. The Sanderson wallpaper factory (1902) in Chiswick is severely functional in form and faced with white-glazed bricks. However, for the fitting out of the offices of the Essex and Suffolk Equitable Insurance Company (designed 1906–9), Capel House, New Broad Street, London, he considered a degree of expensive decoration to be appropriate.

Voysey designed every detail of his houses, including the furniture. His houses were inspired by English vernacular sources of the 16th and early 17th centuries, featuring white roughcast walls with horizontal ribbon windows and huge pitched roofs, and used rough plaster, slate and other materials typical of English farmhouses.

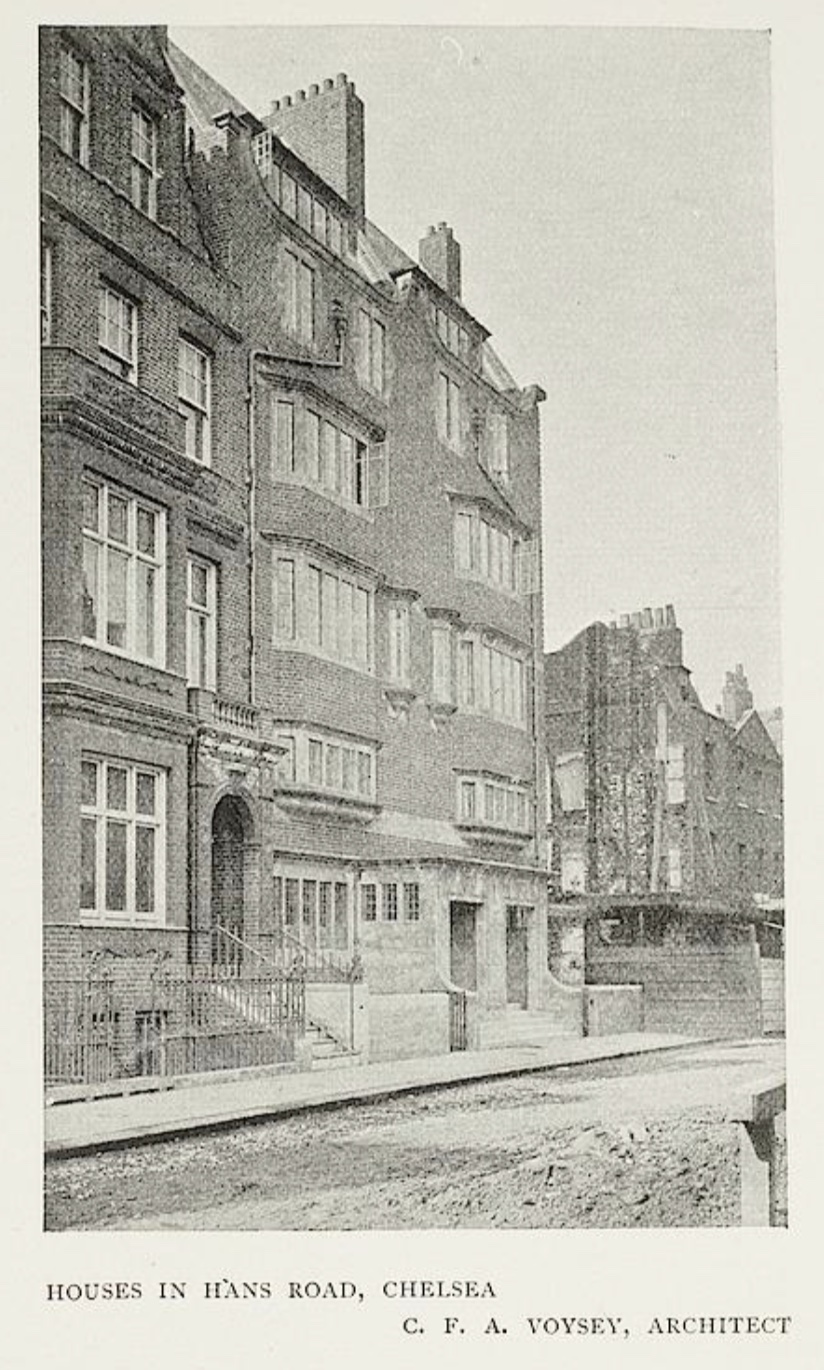
Houses in Hans Road, Chelsea

Examples of his completed architectural works are: Perrycroft, Colwall, Herefordshire 1893; Annesley Lodge, Hampstead, London, 1896; An artist's cottage (14 South Parade), Chiswick, London C.1890; Merlshanger (later Greyfriars), Hog's Back, Puttenham near Guildford, 1896; Norney Grange, Shackleford, 1897; Spade House, Sandgate, Kent (the home of the writer H. G. Wells); Voysey House (a Sanderson wallpaper factory, now offices), Chiswick 1902; The Pastures, North Luffenham, Rutland 1903; The Orchard, Chorleywood, 1900, which he designed for himself; Voysey Garden, Emslie Horniman's Pleasance, North Kensington, 1914 is a public garden designed by Voysey. Voysey designed the Malvern Wells War Memorial in Malvern Wells, Worcestershire. It was unveiled in 1920 and is topped by a sculpture of a pelican.

There are several examples of Voysey's design near Bowness-on-Windermere, Cumbria, with roughcast walls and massive rendered stacks on sweeping slate roofs. Architectural historian Nikolaus Pevsner greatly admired the Orchard, and identified Broad Leys as Voysey's masterpiece, seeing in them seeds of the modernist movement.

Although theoretically quite different, the simplicity and horizontal emphasis of Voysey's houses were incorrectly distinguished as physical precursors of the International Style. Based on this tenuous connection, Voysey received the RIBA Gold Medal in 1940.

In fact, Voysey himself, who was Master of the Art-Workers Guild in 1924, had a strong dislike of modern architecture, and was irritated by Pevsner's identification of his work with the movement.

Broad Leys (1898–1900) is now the headquarters of the Windermere Motor Boat Racing Club, and featured in the film The French Lieutenant's Woman. It is the only Voysey house in which the public are allowed to stay.

Voysey died in Winchester in 1941.

== Legacy ==
Voysey was influenced by the work of William Morris, the Arts and Crafts Movement and Art Nouveau, and was concerned with form and function rather than ornamental complexities. He felt that "simplicity in decoration is one of the essential qualities without which no true richness is possible" and often worked in a limited colour palette, "emphasizing outline, eliminating shading, and minimizing detail." He joined as a member of the Art Workers' Guild in 1884, "the conscientious core of the Arts and Crafts Movement", being elected to the position of Master in 1924.

His furniture designs were simple and functional, and only sparingly decorated. He particularly advocated that wood should be left with its natural finish, contrary to the popular techniques which covered wood with paint and stain. He eschewed the complexities identified with late Victorian design.

Many modest houses built in Britain in the 1920s and 1930s were inspired by Voysey's simple vernacular country houses, although Voysey himself built no houses after 1918.

The Victoria and Albert Museum has an extensive collection of Voysey's work, including design drawings, fabrics, carpets, and wallpapers. Architects influenced by Voysey include Jan Kotera, a leading Czech architect.

2011 saw the formation of the C. F .A. Voysey Society, dedicated to his life and work.

== See also ==
- Herbert Tudor Buckland
- Charles Cowles-Voysey

== References and sources ==
Sources

- Chambers, James (1985). The English House. Norton. ISBN 0-393-02241-2.
- Curl, James Stevens (2000). "Voysey, Charles Francis Annesley". A Dictionary of Architecture and Landscape Architecture. Oxford University Press.
- C.F.A. Voysey biography at GreatBuildings.com, citing Dennis Sharp, The Illustrated Encyclopedia of Architects and Architecture. New York: Quatro Publishing, 1991. ISBN 0-8230-2539-X. NA40.I45. p. 160.
- Jackson, Lesley (2007). Twentieth Century Pattern Design. Princeton Architectural Press. ISBN 978-1-56898-712-5.
- Parry, Linda (2005). Textiles of the Arts & Crafts Movement. Thames and Hudson. ISBN 0-500-28536-5.
- Victoria and Albert Museum (1891). "Birds and plants design for a wallpaper and textile by C.F.A. Voysey (1857–1941)".
