= Margot James =

British politician (born 1957)

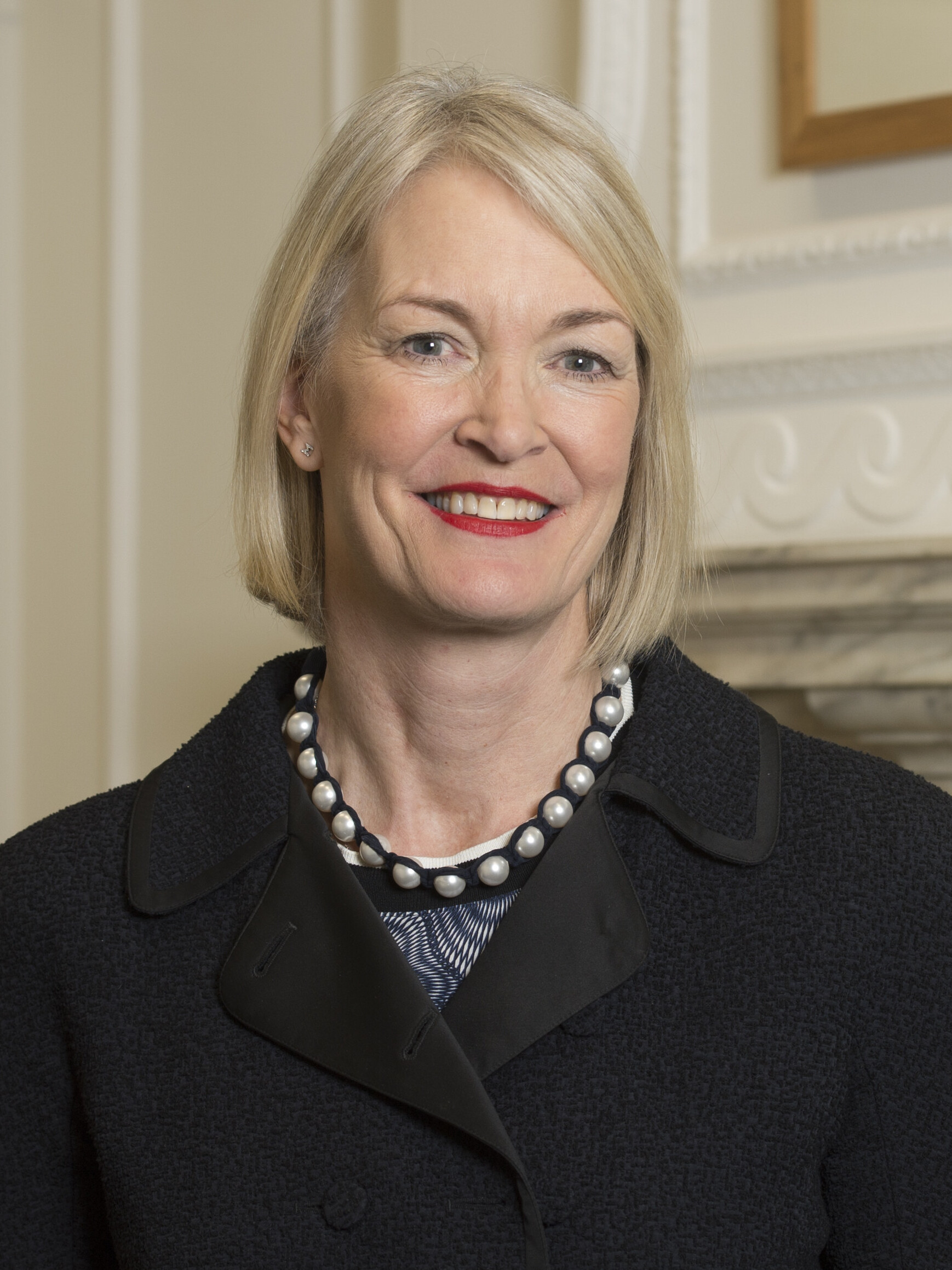
- Official portrait, 2018

Minister of State for Digital and Creative Industries
- In office 9 January 2018 – 18 July 2019
- Prime Minister: Theresa May
- Preceded by: Matt Hancock
- Succeeded by: Nigel Adams

Parliamentary Under-Secretary of State for Small Business, Consumers and Corporate Responsibility
- In office 17 July 2016 – 9 January 2018
- Prime Minister: Theresa May
- Preceded by: Anna Soubry
- Succeeded by: Andrew Griffiths

Member of Parliament for Stourbridge
- In office 6 May 2010 – 6 November 2019
- Preceded by: Lynda Waltho
- Succeeded by: Suzanne Webb

Personal details
- Born: Margot Cathleen James; 28 August 1957 (age 69) Coventry, Warwickshire, England
- Party: Conservative
- Other political affiliations: Independent (1990–2003)
- Domestic partner: Jay Hunt
- Education: London School of Economics (BSc)
- Website: Official website

Margot Cathleen James (/ˈmɑːrɡoʊ dʒeɪmz/; born 28 August 1957) is a British politician who served as Minister of State for Digital and Creative Industries from 2018 to 2019. She was Member of Parliament (MP) for Stourbridge from 2010 to 2019. Elected as a Conservative, she had the whip removed in September 2019 and, after having the whip restored, stood down as an MP prior to the upcoming general election.

== Early life ==
The younger daughter of a self-made businessman, James was born in Coventry. Educated privately in Leamington Spa, she then attended the sixth form at Millfield School in Street, Somerset. James is a graduate of the London School of Economics (LSE) with a degree in Economics and Government.

James joined the Conservative Party aged 17, and chaired the LSE Conservative Association. During her studies, she acted as a researcher for MP Sir Anthony Durant, and after graduation spent a gap year working in the press office of Conservative Central Office.

== Professional career ==
James worked in sales and marketing for her father's business, Maurice James Industries (MJI), a haulage, waste management, and property group based around Birmingham. After working for a consulting firm, in 1986 she co-founded Shire Health Group, a public relations and clinical trials organisation. Shire Health was voted "Consultancy of the Year" three times in the Communiqué Awards for 1998, 1999 and 2001, while James was voted Communicator of the Year in 1997. The company was sold to WPP Group in 2004, with James appointed Head of European Healthcare for WPP subsidiary Ogilvy & Mather.

== Political career ==
James had resigned from the Conservative Party after Margaret Thatcher was ousted as Prime Minister. She rejoined the Conservative Party early in 2003.

At the May 2005 general election, she was the Conservative candidate for the Holborn and St. Pancras constituency; James was the first ever openly lesbian Conservative candidate to stand in a British general election. She came third behind the sitting MP, Labour's Frank Dobson, and the Liberal Democrat candidate Jill Fraser.

In May 2006, James was elected a local councillor for the Brompton ward of Kensington & Chelsea, becoming one of the Conservative Party's few "out" lesbian office holders. She resigned from the council in 2008.

James was placed on the "A-List" of Conservative Party parliamentary candidates ahead of the 2010 general election, and was selected as the candidate for the marginal Labour-held constituency of Stourbridge, from where she was elected. This made her the first openly lesbian MP in the Conservative Party, second "out" lesbian in the House of Commons, after Angela Eagle, and the first to have come out before her election. In her maiden speech she paid tribute to Stourbridge's history of glass making.

She was the Parliamentary Private Secretary to Stephen Green, Baron Green of Hurstpierpoint, during his period as Minister for Trade and Investment from 2011 to 2013. From 2014 to 2015, James served as Parliamentary Private Secretary to William Hague, the then Leader of the House of Commons.

In January 2016, the Labour Party unsuccessfully proposed an amendment in Parliament that would have required private landlords to make their homes "fit for human habitation". According to Parliament's register of interests, James was one of 72 Conservative MPs who voted against the amendment who personally derived an income from renting out property. The Conservative Government had responded to the amendment that they believed homes should be fit for human habitation but did not want to pass the new law that would explicitly require it.

James was opposed to leaving the European Union prior to the 2016 referendum.

James was made Parliamentary Under-Secretary of State for Small Business, Consumers and Corporate Responsibility at the Department for Business, Energy and Industrial Strategy by Theresa May, in her first ministry in July 2016.

James served as Minister of State for Digital and the Creative Industries from 9 January 2018, resigning on 18 July 2019 to vote against the Government on an amendment; rebelling in an attempt to prevent the prorogation of Parliament which could have been used to force through a no-deal Brexit.

James endorsed Rory Stewart during the 2019 Conservative leadership election.

James had the Conservative whip removed on 3 September 2019. On 29 October 2019, she was one of ten Conservative MPs to have the whip restored, but announced on 3 November her intention to stand down as an MP at the 2019 general election, following disagreements with her local party.

== Other activities ==
James served on the board of Parkside NHS Trust, and worked as a Mental Health Manager. She spent ten years as a trustee of ABANTU, an African women's charity, during which time she trained women from more than 40 different African countries in communications and lobbying skills. She has also worked as a mentor for The Prince's Trust and Young Enterprise. She sits on the Court of Governors at LSE.

She is a vice-president of the Debating Group. and in 2019, was named the 50th 'Most Influential Woman in UK Tech' by Computer Weekly magazine.

== Personal life ==
James lives in South Kensington and Stourbridge with her partner, Jay Hunt, previously a producer and presenter with the BBC and now managing director of a video production company, Violet Productions. She ranked in the top 50 on The Independent's "Pink List" of the 101 most influential British gay men and women in 2009.

Parliament of the United Kingdom
Preceded by Lynda Waltho	Member of Parliament for Stourbridge; 2010–2019	Succeeded by Suzanne Webb
Political offices
Preceded by Anna Soubry as Minister of State for Small Business	Parliamentary Under-Secretary of State for Small Business, Consumers and Corporate Responsibility; 2016–2018	Succeeded by Andrew Griffiths
