= Ty Bronna =

House in Cardiff

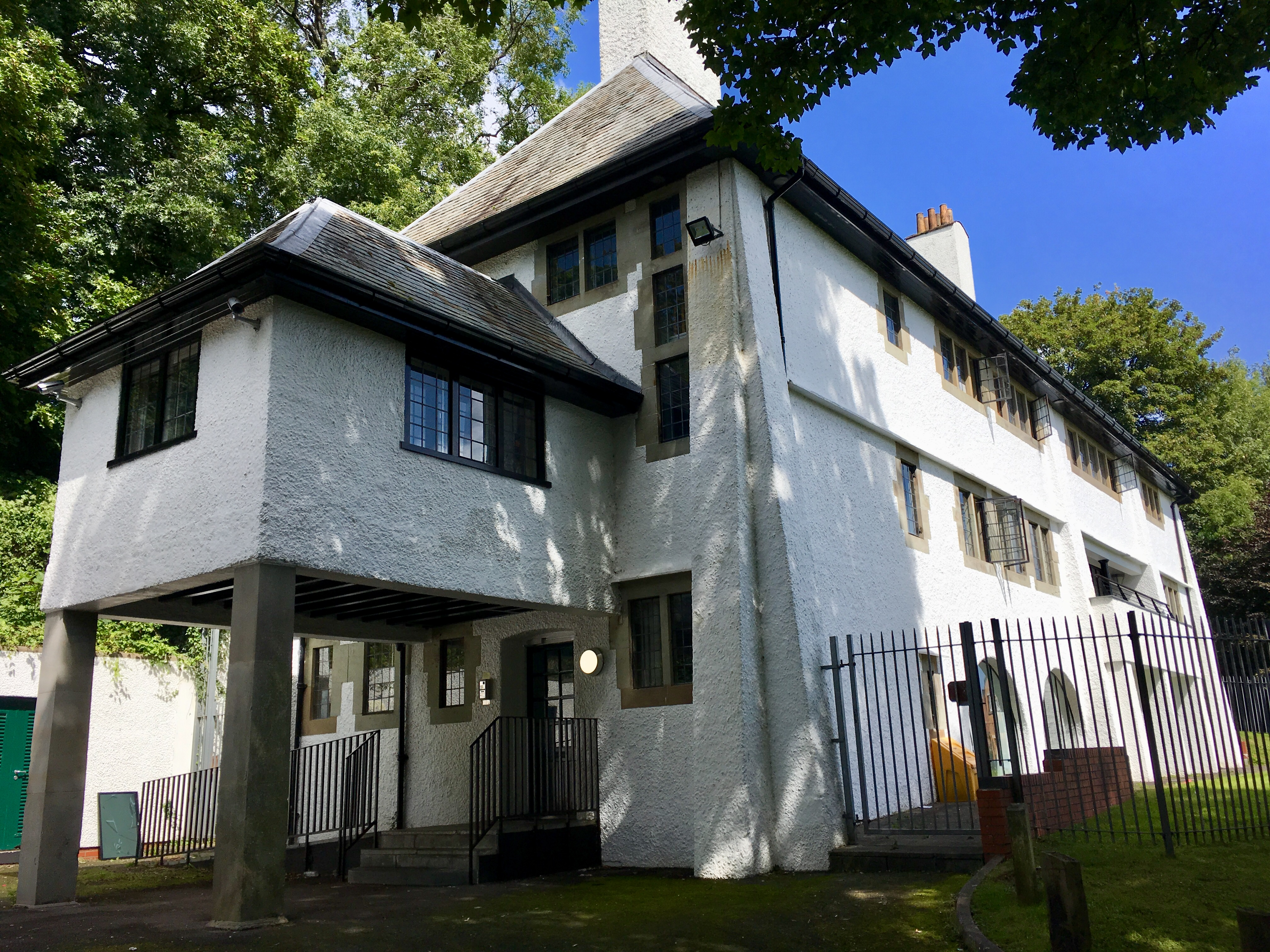

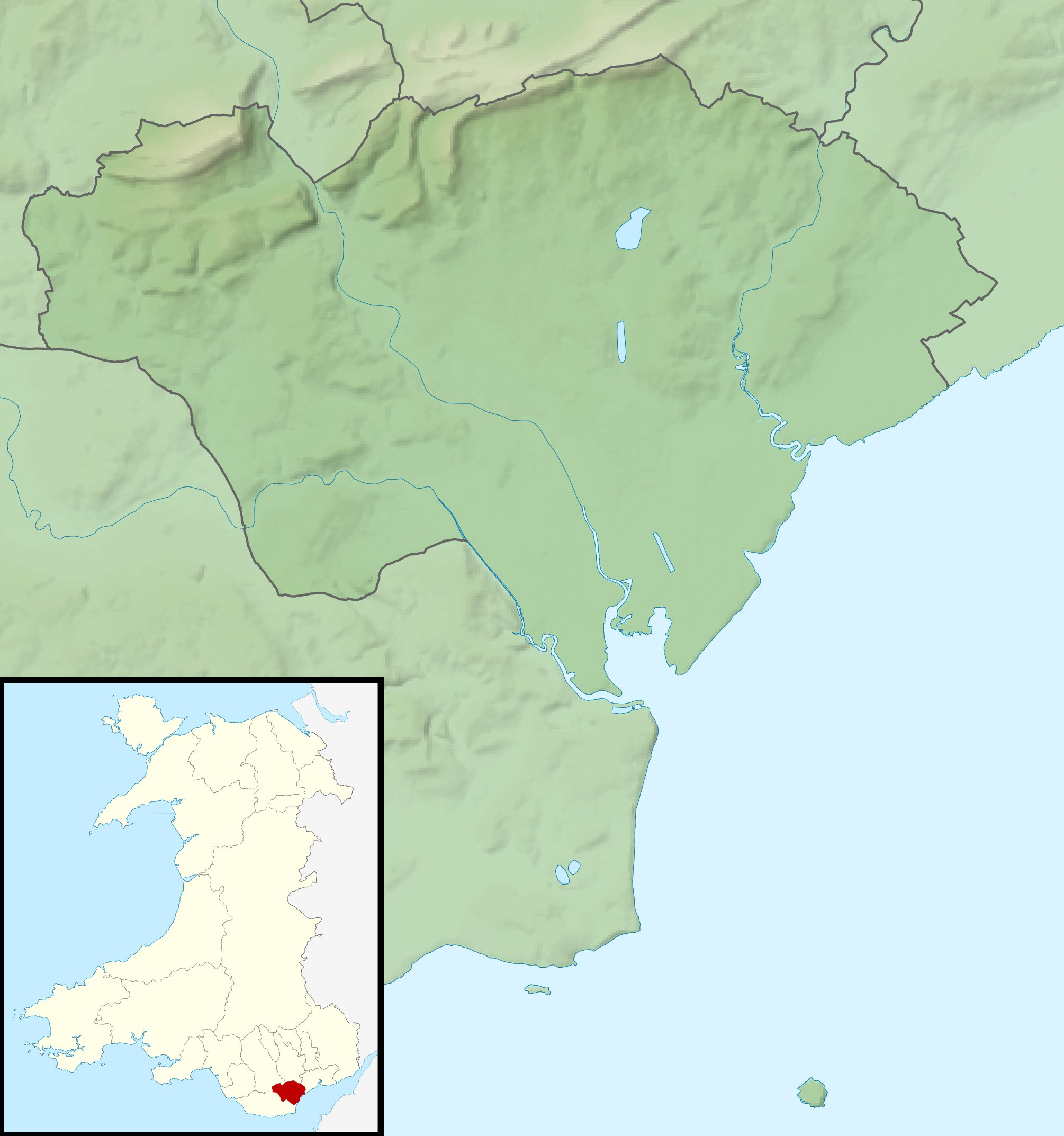
- Location within Cardiff
- 51.4897°N 3.2541°W
- Type: House
- Location: Cardiff

History
- Built: 1903-6

Site notes
- Architect: C. F. A. Voysey
- Architectural style: Arts and Crafts

Listed Building – Grade II
- Official name: Ty Bronna
- Designated: 19 May 1975; 51 years ago 19/05/1975
- Reference no.: 13790

Listed Building – Grade II
- Official name: Former Stables at Ty Bronna
- Designated: 19 May 1975; 51 years ago 19/05/1975
- Reference no.: 13791

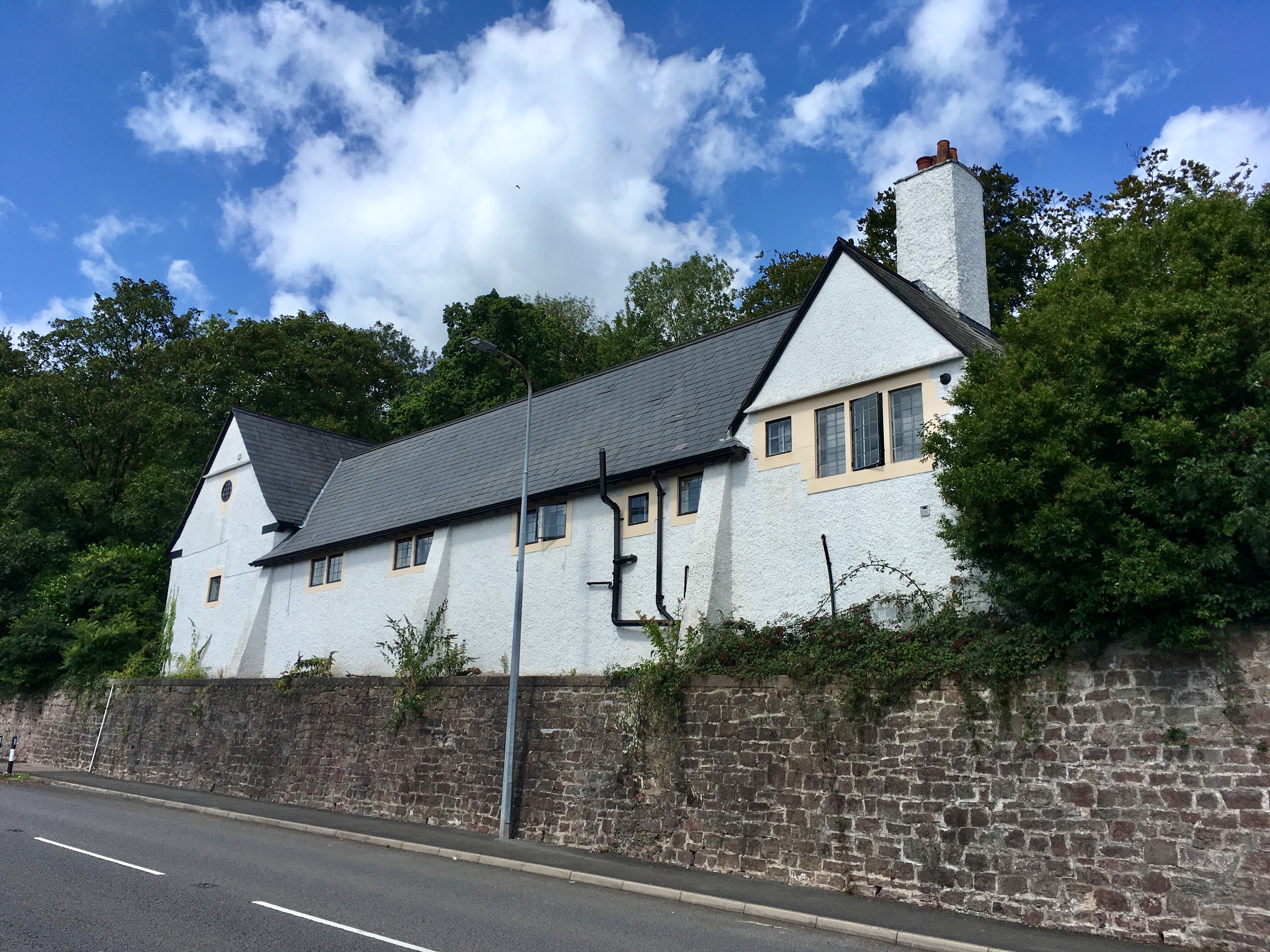
Stables to Ty Bronna

Ty Bronna is a large detached house on St Fagan's Road in the Cardiff suburb of Fairwater. It was designed by C. F. A. Voysey for Hastings Watson, a timber merchant, and built between 1903 and 1906. The house has been listed Grade II since May 1975. It is the only listed building designed by Voysey in Wales.

The house sits on a hillside surrounded by trees above the St Fagans Road, the former stables to the south of the house were also designed by Voysey, built in 1904, and are Grade II listed. The RCAHMW report on Ty Bronna praises Voysey as having "...exploited the slope by placing the entrance at the short west end so that he could open up a five-arched veranda almost the full width of the south front which faced the view over the valley of the River Ely". The house is three storeys in height, capped by a hipped roof, battered buttresses rise from the ground to the eaves. It has a bowed east window with a recessed veranda and was restored in 2002.

Since 2001, the Church Army has provided accommodation at Ty Bronna for 16–21 year-olds who find themselves without a home and to support them towards independent living.
