= 1927 Stourbridge by-election =

UK parliamentary by-election

This was a parliamentary by-election for the British House of Commons constituency of Stourbridge. Stourbridge was one of the Worcestershire constituencies, bordering Bewdley, where the Conservative Prime Minister, Stanley Baldwin sat.

== Vacancy ==
Douglas Pielou who had been the Unionist MP here since 1922, died on 9 January 1927, at the age of 39, causing the by-election.

== Electoral history ==
Pielou had gained the seat in 1922 from the Liberals. Since then, Labour had emerged as the main challenger, finishing a close second at the last General election in 1924;

General election, 29 October 1924: Stourbridge Electorate: 48,466
Party	Candidate	Votes	%	±%
Unionist	Douglas Pielou	16,023	39.5	−0.3
Labour	Wilfred Wellock	14,113	34.8	+10.4
Liberal	Geoffrey Mander	10,418	25.7	−10.1
Majority		1,910	4.7	+0.7
Turnout		40,554		
Unionist hold		Swing		

== Candidates ==
Henry Hogbin

- The Unionist candidate chosen to defend the seat was 47-year-old Henry Hogbin. He had served briefly as the Liberal MP for Battersea South from 1923-24. At the 1924 election he had been defeated standing as a Constitutionalist despite the support of both Unionist and Liberal local Associations.
- The Labour candidate was 50-year-old pacifist Wilfred Wellock. He was contesting the seat for the third time, having lost on the previous two occasions. He was imprisoned as a conscientious objector in the First World War.
- The local Liberal association selected 41 year-old Aneurin John Glyn Edwards as their candidate. Edwards had traveled the country as a Factory Inspector. He then worked as a Barrister on the North Wales and Chester circuits. He was standing as a Liberal candidate for parliament for the fourth time, having contested; West Bromwich in 1922 and 1923 and Cardiff Central in 1924.

== Campaign ==
Polling day was set for 23 February 1927, forty-five days after the death of Pielou, allowing for a reasonably lengthy campaign.

== Result ==
Labour gained the seat from the Unionists;

Stourbridge by-election, 23 February 1927
Party	Candidate	Votes	%	±%
Labour	Wilfred Wellock	16,561	41.9	+7.1
Unionist	Henry Hogbin	13,462	34.0	−5.5
Liberal	Aneurin John Glyn Edwards	9,535	24.1	−1.6
Majority		3,099	7.9	N/A
Turnout		39,558		
Labour gain from Unionist		Swing		

== Aftermath ==
Wellock stood again here at the next General Election and was re-elected. Hogbin did not stand again. Edwards contested Burnley and finished third.

General election, 30 May 1929: Stourbridge
Party	Candidate	Votes	%	±%
Labour	Wilfred Wellock	21,343	38.4	−3.5
Unionist	Stanley Reed	17,675	31.8	−2.2
Liberal	Donald Finnemore	16,537	29.8	+5.7
Majority		3,668	6.6	−1.3
Turnout		55,555		
Labour hold		Swing		
