= John William Wilson =

British politician

John William Wilson

John William Wilson, PC, JP (22 October 1858 – 18 June 1932) was a British chemical manufacturer and politician who served for 27 years as a member of parliament (MP), initially as Liberal Unionist and then as a Liberal.

== Background ==
Wilson was the eldest son of John Edward Wilson of Wyddrington, Edgbaston and Catherine Stacey of Tottenham. He was educated at Grove House School, Tottenham and in Germany. In 1883 he married Florence Jane Harrison who died in 1911. In 1919 he married Isabel Bannatyne. He served as a Justice of the peace in Worcestershire and Herefordshire. He worked for the chemical manufacturers Albright and Wilson Limited of Oldbury. He became a director of the Great Western Railway Company and of Bryant and May Limited.

== Political career ==
Wilson was elected to Worcestershire County Council, representing the Langley division. He was elected at the 1895 general election as Liberal Unionist MP for the Northern division of Worcestershire against a Liberal opponent. He was re-elected unopposed at the 1900 general election. In April 1903 he left the Liberal Unionists and joined the Liberal Party, and although he enjoyed no further uncontested elections he was returned to the House of Commons as a Liberal in 1906 and in both the January 1910 and December 1910 elections. He was made a Privy Councillor in July 1911.

When constituencies were revised for the 1918 general election, Wilson was elected for the newly created Stourbridge division of Worcestershire. He had been opposed by candidates of both the Labour Party and the National Democratic and Labour Party, the latter holding a "coalition coupon", and he won with only 38.5% of the votes. In 1922 he faced only a Conservative opponent, Douglas Pielou, who won the seat. Wilson did not stand for Parliament again.

=== Electoral record ===
General election 1895: North Worcestershire
Party	Candidate	Votes	%	±%
Liberal Unionist	John Wilson	5,012	55.5	
Liberal	R Waite	4,024	44.5	
Majority		988	11.0	
Turnout			80.6	
Liberal Unionist gain from Liberal		Swing		

General election 1900: North Worcestershire
Party	Candidate	Votes	%	±%
Liberal Unionist	John Wilson	unopposed	n/a	n/a
Liberal Unionist hold		Swing	n/a	

General election 1906: North Worcestershire
Party	Candidate	Votes	%	±%
Liberal	John Wilson		51.8	n/a
Liberal Unionist	William Campion	6,429	48.2	n/a
Majority		479	3.6	n/a
Turnout			84.8	n/a
Liberal gain from Liberal Unionist		Swing	n/a	

General election 1918 Stourbridge
Party	Candidate	Votes	%	±%
Liberal	John Wilson	8,920	38.5	n/a
Labour	Mary Anderson	7,587	32.7	n/a
National Democratic	Victor Fisher	6,690	28.8	n/a
Majority		1,333	5.8	n/a
Turnout		23,197		n/a
Liberal win (new seat)				

General election 1922 : Stourbridge
Party	Candidate	Votes	%	±%
Unionist	Douglas Pielou	18,200	51.8	n/a
Liberal	John Wilson	16,949	48.2	+9.7
Majority		1,251	3.6	
Turnout		35,149		
Unionist gain from Liberal		Swing	n/a	

Parliament of the United Kingdom
Preceded by Sir Benjamin Hingley, Bt	Member of Parliament for North Worcestershire; 1895 – 1918	Constituency abolished
New constituency	Member of Parliament for Stourbridge; 1918 – 1922	Succeeded by Douglas Pielou
