= Robert Morgan (British politician) =

British politician

Robert Harry Morgan (25 January 1880 – 28 November 1960) was a Conservative Party politician in the United Kingdom.

He was elected at the 1931 general election as member of parliament (MP) for the Stourbridge division of Worcestershire, defeating the sitting Labour MP Wilfred Wellock. Morgan was re-elected in 1935 and held the seat until his defeat at the 1945 general election.

Parliament of the United Kingdom
Preceded by Wilfred Wellock	Member of Parliament for Stourbridge; 1931 – 1945	Succeeded by Arthur Moyle
