= Douglas Pielou =

British soldier and politician (1887–1927)

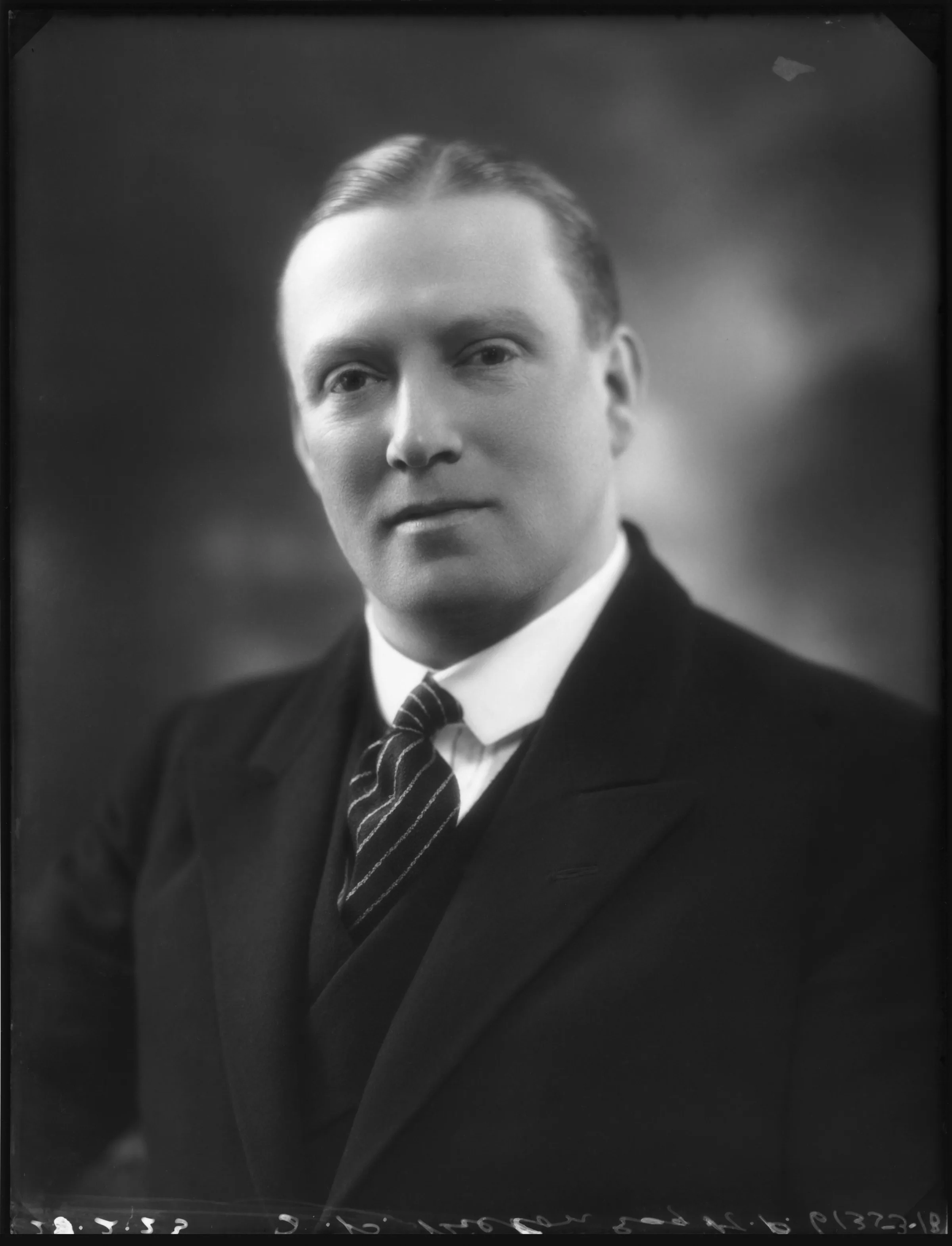
- Pielou in 1923

Member of Parliament for Stourbridge
- In office 1922-1927

Personal details
- Born: Douglas Percival Pielou; 17 October 1887 Glasgow, Scotland
- Died: 9 January 1927 (aged 39)
- Party: Conservative
- Military career
- Rank: Regimental Sergeant-Major
- Unit: Queen's Own Cameron Highlanders
- Conflicts: World War I

Douglas Percival Pielou (17 October 1887 – 9 January 1927) was a British soldier who was disabled from injuries received in the First World War and went on to become a Conservative Member of Parliament (MP).

== Biography ==
Pielou was born in Glasgow in 1887, the son an excise officer. During the war, he was Regimental Sergeant-Major (RSM) of the Queen's Own Cameron Highlanders, and was severely wounded at the Battle of Loos in 1915.

He was elected at the 1922 general election as MP for the Stourbridge division of Worcestershire, defeating the sitting Liberal MP John William Wilson. Pielou was re-elected in 1923 and 1924, and died in office in 1927, aged 39.

Parliament of the United Kingdom
Preceded by John Wilson	Member of Parliament for Stourbridge; 1922 – 1927	Succeeded by Wilfred Wellock
