= Arthur Moyle, Baron Moyle =

British bricklayer, trade union official and politician

The Right Honourable The Lord Moyle CBE
- Arthur Moyle, Baron Moyle in 1946

Member of Parliament for Oldbury and Halesowen Stourbridge (1945–1950)
- In office 5 July 1945 – 25 September 1964
- Preceded by: Robert Morgan
- Succeeded by: John Horner

Parliamentary Private Secretary to the Prime Minister
- In office 1946–1951
- Prime Minister: Clement Attlee
- Preceded by: Geoffrey de Freitas
- Succeeded by: Christopher Soames

Personal details
- Born: 25 September 1894 Cornwall
- Died: 23 December 1974 (aged 80)
- Party: Labour
- Spouse(s): Elizabeth Evans (m. 1921; died 1949) Lena Bassett (m. 1951)
- Children: Roland Moyle; Jeremy Moyle
- Occupation: Bricklayer; Trade Union Official

Arthur Moyle, Baron Moyle, CBE (25 September 1894 – 23 December 1974) was a British bricklayer, trade union official and politician. As a member of parliament for nineteen years, he was principally known for serving as Parliamentary private secretary to Clement Attlee during Attlee's Premiership. He was also perennially lucky in the ballot for Private member's bills.

== Early work ==
Moyle was a native of Cornwall, the son of a stonemason. He grew up in Llanidloes, Montgomeryshire and went to the National School there. He learned the trade of a bricklayer, and worked in Wales and the Welsh Marches. He was active in trade union work and in 1918, he became Secretary of the Shrewsbury Building Trades Federation.

== 1924 election ==
From 1920 Moyle was promoted to be an official of the National Federation of Building Trade Operatives. He also became active in the Labour Party, and in the 1924 general election he was chosen as Labour Party candidate for Torquay. Moyle's intervention in what was a close fight between the Conservatives and Liberals, where Labour had not fought in the two previous elections, was met with annoyance on the part of the Liberal Party. In the end, the Liberals lost the seat by much more than the 2,752 votes which Moyle obtained.

== Trade union work ==
After trade union mergers, Moyle became National Officer of the National Union of Public Employees, which made him responsible for local authority workers generally and not just those in construction. In the year 1937–1938 Moyle was Chairman of the National Joint Council for Local Authorities Non-Trading Services. He was a spokesman of a delegation to the government to ask for pensions for manual workers as well as local government officers in 1937.

In May 1938 he joined a delegation pressing for a Whitley Council for nurses, to fix minimum salaries and maximum hours. During the Second World War, Moyle represented the Trades Union Congress on the Nurses Salaries Committee chaired by Lord Rushcliffe which published two reports in 1943. Moyle was a member of the National Joint Council for Local Authorities Administrative Professional, Technical and Clerical Staffs, and in 1945 was chairman of the Trades Union Congress Local Advisory Committee.

== Member of Parliament ==
Moyle had been adopted as Labour Parliamentary candidate for Stourbridge in January 1940, His chance to fight the seat had to be delayed during the war, but when the election came in 1945 he won the seat from the Conservatives with a majority of nearly 16,000. In Parliament he concentrated on local authority workers' issues, and in supporting the National Insurance Bill in February 1946, he spoke of his concern for the local authority staff who would find themselves redundant after the Bill became law. He called for adequate compensation to be paid.

== Parliamentary Private Secretary ==
In May 1946, Moyle was appointed as Parliamentary private secretary to the Prime Minister, Clement Attlee, following Geoffrey de Freitas who had been given a ministerial post. The appointment gave Moyle a central role in managing relations between Attlee and government backbenchers, and almost silenced him in the chamber of the House of Commons. Attlee gave his PPS access to almost all important decisions, and respected Moyle's advice on the sometimes fractious Parliamentary Labour Party.

== Private member's bills ==
Following boundary changes, Moyle was elected for Oldbury and Halesowen in the 1950 general election. That November, he drew top place in the ballot for Private member's bills, and introduced a Bill to tighten up the licensing of fireworks. The Bill passed into law. Moyle continued to act as Attlee's Parliamentary Private Secretary when Labour went into opposition following the 1951 general election, and was appointed a Commander of Order of the British Empire (CBE) in Attlee's resignation honours list.

In July 1952 Moyle insisted that civil defence, even in the nuclear age, should not be made into a disciplined force, but instead find its own level of discipline as in the Second World War. In November 1953 he came top of the ballot for Private Member's Bills, and chose the subject of humane slaughter of horses. His Bill received government support and was also enacted. Later, in June 1957, Moyle was elected chairman of the International League for the Protection of Horses.

== Air pollution ==
After Attlee retired as Leader of the Opposition, Moyle was allowed to range more widely in his contributions. He was particularly concerned about air pollution and complained that smokeless fuel was too expensive and slow to order; he advocated the nationalisation of the companies who made it to expand production. During the Suez Crisis, Moyle stated that Britain had destroyed her moral authority by one action and lost the opportunity to criticise the Soviet Union for its action in Hungary. He wanted naval courts martial to be composed of petty officers and ratings as well as officers.

== Third private member's bill ==
Moyle topped the ballot for Private Member's Bills for a third time in November 1957. This time he introduced a Bill to implement recommendations of a Royal commission on the children of divorced people. As with his previous Bills, he secured government support and received Royal Assent. In 1957 and 1958, Moyle ran unsuccessfully for the Shadow Cabinet, although he polled poorly.

Following the 1959 general election, Moyle found himself unable to play an active part in Parliament due to illness. His lack of participation was highlighted by the BBC television programme "That Was the Week That Was" in January 1963, which listed all 13 MPs who had not made a speech in the entire Parliament. He announced his retirement, and left the House at the 1964 general election.

== Life peerage ==
In September 1965, Moyle wrote to The Times to urge that one cricket test match in each tour should be allocated to South Wales. In the Queen's Birthday honours list of 1966, he was given a life peerage, being created Baron Moyle, of Llanidloes in the County of Montgomery on 23 June 1966. On the death of Earl Attlee (as he had since become), Moyle was named as his literary executor. In March 1970 he spoke against making an application to join the European Communities, arguing that Britain should stand by the United States who had stood by Britain in two world wars and were continuing to do so.

Moyle married Elizabeth Evans from Llanidloes in 1921, but was widowed in 1949. Their son, Roland Moyle, was later a Labour Member of Parliament for Lewisham. He remarried in 1951 to Lena Bassett of Frant, Sussex.

Moyle Drive, a residential cul-de-sac in Cradley was named for Arthur Moyle in 1976.

Parliament of the United Kingdom
Preceded by Robert Morgan	Member of Parliament for Stourbridge; 1945–1950	Constituency abolished
New constituency	Member of Parliament for Oldbury and Halesowen; 1950–1964	Succeeded by John Horner
Government offices
Preceded by Geoffrey de Freitas	Parliamentary Private Secretary to the Prime Minister; 1946–1951	Succeeded by Christopher Soames
