= Wilfred Wellock =

Member of Parliament for Stourbridge
- In office 1927–1931
- Preceded by: Douglas Pielou
- Succeeded by: Robert Morgan

Personal details
- Born: 2 January 1879 Nelson, Lancashire, United Kingdom of Great Britain and Ireland
- Died: 22 July 1972 (aged 93) Heath Charnock, Lancashire, United Kingdom
- Party: Labour

Wilfred Wellock (2 January 1879 – 22 July 1972) was a socialist Gandhian and sometime Labour politician and MP.

== Life ==
=== Early life ===
Wellock was born to a factory worker in the Lancashire town of Nelson in 1879.

=== Politics ===
He was imprisoned as a conscientious objector in the First World War.

He was elected as member of parliament (MP) for Stourbridge at a by-election in February 1927, having unsuccessfully contested the seat in 1923 and 1924. He was re-elected in 1929, but at the 1931 general election he was defeated by the Conservative Party candidate. Wellock stood again at the 1935 election, but did not regain his seat.

Wellock was an active member of both the No More War Movement and the Peace Pledge Union. He was a prolific pamphleteer. Wellock was a vegetarian.

=== Death and legacy ===
Wellock died in Heath Charnock, Lancashire in 1972.

Wellock's work was admired by Aldous Huxley, who stated in his book Science, Liberty and Peace that Wellock and Ralph Borsodi's work constituted a "tiny piece of decentralist leaven" within the "whole large lump of contemporary society".

== Publications ==
- Wellock, Wilfred (1917). A Modern Idealist. [A novel.] (London : C. W. Daniel)
- Wellock, Wilfred (1921). Christian Communism, etc. (pp. 43. National Labour Press: Manchester)
- Wellock, Wilfred (1922). India's Awakening: Its National and World-Wide Significance. (pp. 69. Labour Publishing Co.: London)
- Wellock, Wilfred (1938). Destruction or Construction-Which? An open letter to members of the Labour Party, (pp. 11. Peace Pledge Union: London])
- Wellock, Wilfred (1943). A Mechanistic or a Human Society?. (pp. 32. Wilfred Wellock: Quinton)
- Wellock, Wilfred (1950). Gandhi as a social revolutionary (Birmingham : W. Wellock)
- Wellock, Wilfred (1951). The Challenge of our Times. Annihilation or creative revolution? (pp. 15. London)
- Wellock, Wilfred (1955). Not by Bread alone. A study of America's expanding economy. [(pp. 16. Housmans: London)
- Wellock, Wilfred (1961). Off the beaten track : adventures in the art of living.
- Wellock, Wilfred (c. 1961). The crisis in our civilisation : reorganisation by industry a key to world peace, (London : Society for Democratic Integration in Industry)
- Wellock, Wilfred. Youth and adventure: on which side shall I enlist?
- Wellock, Wilfred. Power or peace western industrialism and world leadership
- Wellock, Wilfred. Rebuilding Britain. A new peace orientation. (pp. 47. Hallmark Books: London)

Parliament of the United Kingdom
Preceded by Douglas Pielou	Member of Parliament for Stourbridge; 1927 – 1931	Succeeded by Robert Morgan
