= Ministry of Civil Aviation Aerodrome Fire Service =

Airport fire service overview
- Formed: 1947
- Jurisdiction: Ministry of Civil Aviation
- Headquarters: United Kingdom
- Parent department: Ministry of Civil Aviation

The Ministry of Civil Aviation Aerodrome Fire Service was a national airport fire service which operated in British airports run by the Ministry of Civil Aviation.

When the Ministry of Civil Aviation was established in 1946, firefighting services at its airports were originally provided by individual units at each location, answering directly to the airport manager. The following year, after a number of incidents, it was decided that this was unworkable and Sir Aylmer Firebrace, Chief of the Fire Staff of the National Fire Service, was asked to organise a national fire service for civil airports.

Unlike the local authority fire brigades, airport firemen belonged to the Transport and General Workers' Union and not the Fire Brigades Union.

== Ranks ==
Ranks used by the Aerodrome Fire Service were:

- Fireman
- Leading fireman
- Section leader (Note: Rank had apparently disappeared by the 1950s)
- Aerodrome fire officer II
- Aerodrome fire officer I
- Divisional fire service officer
- Deputy chief fire service officer
- Chief fire service officer

== See also ==
- Airport rescue and firefighting services in the United Kingdom
- Fire services in the United Kingdom
