= Terry Parry =

British firefighter & trade unionist (1921-1982)

Terence Parry CBE (24 December 1921 – 15 April 1982) was a British firefighter and trade unionist.

Born in Coniston, Lancashire, Parry started work for the Blue Funnel Line at the age of fifteen. He served in the Royal Navy in the Pacific during World War II, and joined the Fire Service in Birmingham as soon as he was demobbed.

Parry rapidly became active in the Fire Brigades Union, and was elected as its President in 1959. In 1964, he beat Enoch Humphries by 2,000 votes to become General Secretary of the union. Humphries was subsequently elected as his replacement as President, and the two worked closely together, arguing successfully that firefighters should take on fire prevention inspections in place of cleaning work.

Parry led the union through a two-month strike in late 1977 and early 1978. This ended with the strikers accepting a settlement well below their demands, and only in line with other public sector employees.

Parry was elected to the General Council of the Trades Union Congress (TUC) in 1968, serving until his retirement in 1981. In 1980, he was President of the TUC. He also served on the Health and Safety Commission, and joined the Broadcasting Complaints Commission on retirement from his union duties. However, he died the following year, his funeral service being conducted at his own request by Bruce Kent, even though the two had never met. He appointed a CBE in the 1977 Silver Jubilee and Birthday Honours.

Trade union offices
Preceded by John Burns	President of the Fire Brigades Union; 1959–1964	Succeeded by Enoch Humphries
Preceded by John Horner	General Secretary of the Fire Brigades Union; 1964–1981	Succeeded by Ken Cameron
Preceded by Thomas Jackson	President of the Trades Union Congress; 1980	Succeeded by Alan Fisher
Preceded by ?	Chairman of the Trades Councils' Joint Consultative Committee; 1979–1981	Succeeded by Doug Grieve
