= Frank Bailey (firefighter) =

Guyanese-British firefighter

- Bailey in 1955
- Born: Frank Arthur Bailey; 26 November 1925; British Guiana
- Died: 2 December 2015 (aged 90)
- Known for: One of the first black firefighters in the UK
- Spouses: Isabella Maven (divorced) Josie Munro (divorced) Joy Greenall (divorced)
- Children: 3

Frank Arthur Bailey (26 November 1925 – 2 December 2015) was a Guyanese-British firefighter and social worker who is known as being one of the first black firefighters in the United Kingdom.

Born in British Guiana, he first worked on a German trade ship which led him to move to New York where he soon found work at a hospital, becoming a medical assistant. In opposition to racially segregated practices, he led a walkout at the hospital. In 1953, he moved to London and came across a Fire Brigades Union (FBU) delegate who told him that black people were not employed by the fire service because they were "not educated or strong enough", though he challenged this by applying as a firefighter. In 1955, he was accepted and became one of the first black firefighters in the UK, though left 10 years later due to being consistently turned down for promotion due to inherent racism in the service. Afterwards, he became a social worker, guardian ad litem and a legal adviser, retiring in 1990.

== Biography ==
Frank Arthur Bailey was born in British Guiana on 26 November 1925 and was educated at local church schools. He went on to become an engineering apprentice and worked on a German trade ship as a coal trimmer. This led him to move to New York, United States, where he found work at a hospital, initially as a porter before becoming a medical assistant within the physiotherapy department. At the hospital, he successfully led a walkout in opposition to racially segregated dining facilities.

In 1953, shortly after returning to British Guiana, Bailey moved to London, England. He attended a Trades Union Congress conference where a Fire Brigades Union (FBU) delegate told him that black people were not employed by the fire service because they were "not educated or strong enough" though he challenged this by applying as a firefighter. In 1955, he was accepted by the West Ham Fire Brigade and served at the Silvertown Fire Station in East London. He became the first black full-time firefighter in London and possibly the UK. However, there are some reports of black firefighters serving during World War II. Soon after, he became the FBU branch representative and befriended the then FBU general secretary, John Horner.

In 1965, he left the service due to being systematically turned down for promotions whilst white firefighters were being promoted ahead of him. According to Michael Nicholas, a former FBU national secretary for black and ethnic minority members, this was due to the inherent racism within the service. He was then employed as a social worker in the Royal Borough of Kensington and Chelsea, London and became one of the first black mental welfare officers and psychiatric social workers. He then worked as a guardian ad litem and subsequently retired in 1990. During this time, he was also the first black legal advisor to black young people at Marylebone Magistrates Court.

Throughout his life Bailey had three marriages which all resulted in divorce, the first to Isabella Maven, the second to Josie Munro, and the third to Joy Greenall.

He died on 2 December 2015 aged 90. He is survived by his three daughters, Rebecca from his second marriage; Jumanne and Alexis from his third marriage. Over 80 London firefighters gave a guard of honour at his funeral on 11 January 2016.

On 26 November 2020, his 95th birthday was honoured by Google UK with a Doodle.
