= Matt Wrack =

British trade unionist & firefighter (born 1962)

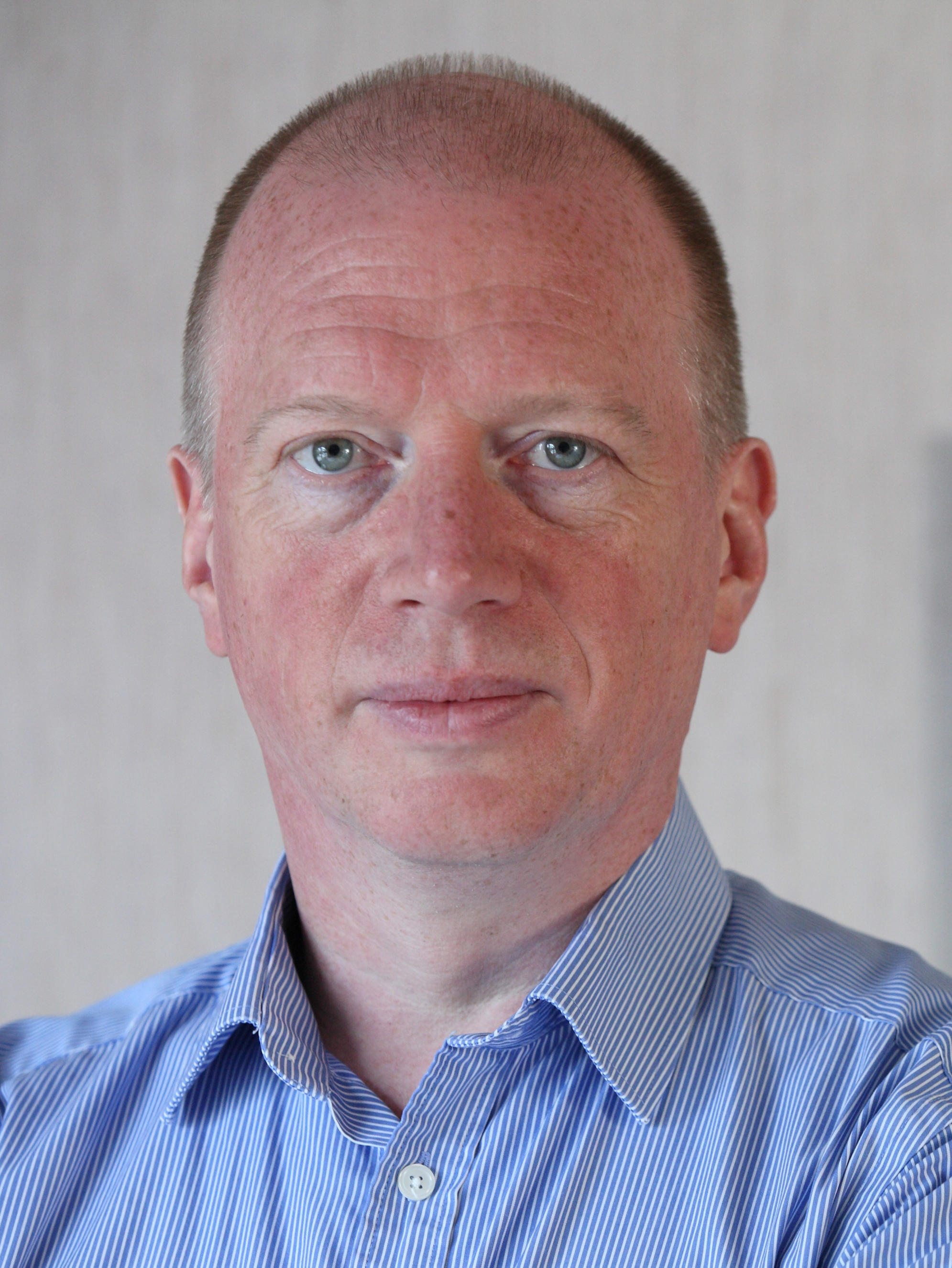
- Matt Wrack in 2014

General Secretary of NASUWT
- Incumbent
- Assumed office 2025
- Preceded by: Patrick Roach

General Secretary of the Fire Brigades Union
- In office 2005–2025
- Preceded by: Andy Gilchrist
- Succeeded by: Steve Wright

Personal details
- Born: Matthew D. Wrack; 23 May 1962 (age 64) Manchester, UK
- Party: Labour Party (1978 – ?, 2016 – present)
- Other political affiliations: Socialist Party (? – c. 2005)
- Known for: Trade unionist

Matthew D. Wrack (born 23 May 1962) is a British trade unionist and former firefighter. He served as General Secretary of the Fire Brigades Union (FBU) from May 2005 to January 2025. He is presently General Secretary of the NASUWT teaching union. He was President of the Trades Union Congress from 2023 to 2024.

== Education and early career ==
Wrack was born in Manchester to a journalist father, and went to a Catholic grammar school in Salford. He later studied at the Open University and undertook a part-time master's degree at the London School of Economics.

Wrack moved to London in 1981 and worked for a time in the DHSS before joining the fire service at his father's suggestion.

== Politics ==
Wrack joined the Labour Party Young Socialists in Salford in 1978 and was a member of Farnworth Constituency Labour Party during the period in which the local MP John Roper left Labour to join the Social Democratic Party.

A union source said Wrack was expelled from the Labour Party in 1990. He joined the Socialist Party, which he had left by the time he was elected to lead the Kingston upon Thames-headquartered FBU in 2005. His union disaffiliated from the Labour Party in 2004 but reaffiliated in November 2015. In 2007, he contributed to the election campaign fund of the Labour MP for Hendon, Andrew Dismore, and in 2012, he campaigned for and donated to the Trade Unionist and Socialist Coalition. In March 2016, he rejoined the Labour Party. In September 2017, he was listed at Number 87 in 'The 100 Most Influential People on the Left'.

== Fire Brigades Union ==
=== Service in the London Fire Brigade ===
Wrack joined the London Fire Brigade in 1983. He was initially posted to Silvertown Fire Station in the east London borough of Newham, which was closed during a round of cuts in 2014. In 1988 he transferred to Kingsland Road fire station in Hackney where he spent most of his fire service career on the Green watch. Kingsland Fire Station was also closed during the cuts of 2014 and Wrack attended the protest at the closure.

Wrack held various positions in the Fire Brigades Union at branch, area and regional level. He was elected branch secretary in 1984 and served on the FBU's London Regional Committee from 1988. He worked with Mick Shaw on the North East London Area Committee where both became at various stages secretary and chair. Shaw went on to become the FBU President.

=== Gillender Street Fire ===
In July 1991, whilst North East London Area Secretary of the FBU, Wrack attended the fatal fire at Gillender Street at which two firefighters, Terry Hunt and David Stokoe were killed. Wrack had previously worked with Hunt. Matt Wrack and the then FBU London Regional Secretary (later MP) Jim Fitzpatrick, investigated the incident and produced the FBU report. The London Fire Brigade was later served with two improvement notices by the Health and Safety Executive.

=== Organising in the FBU ===
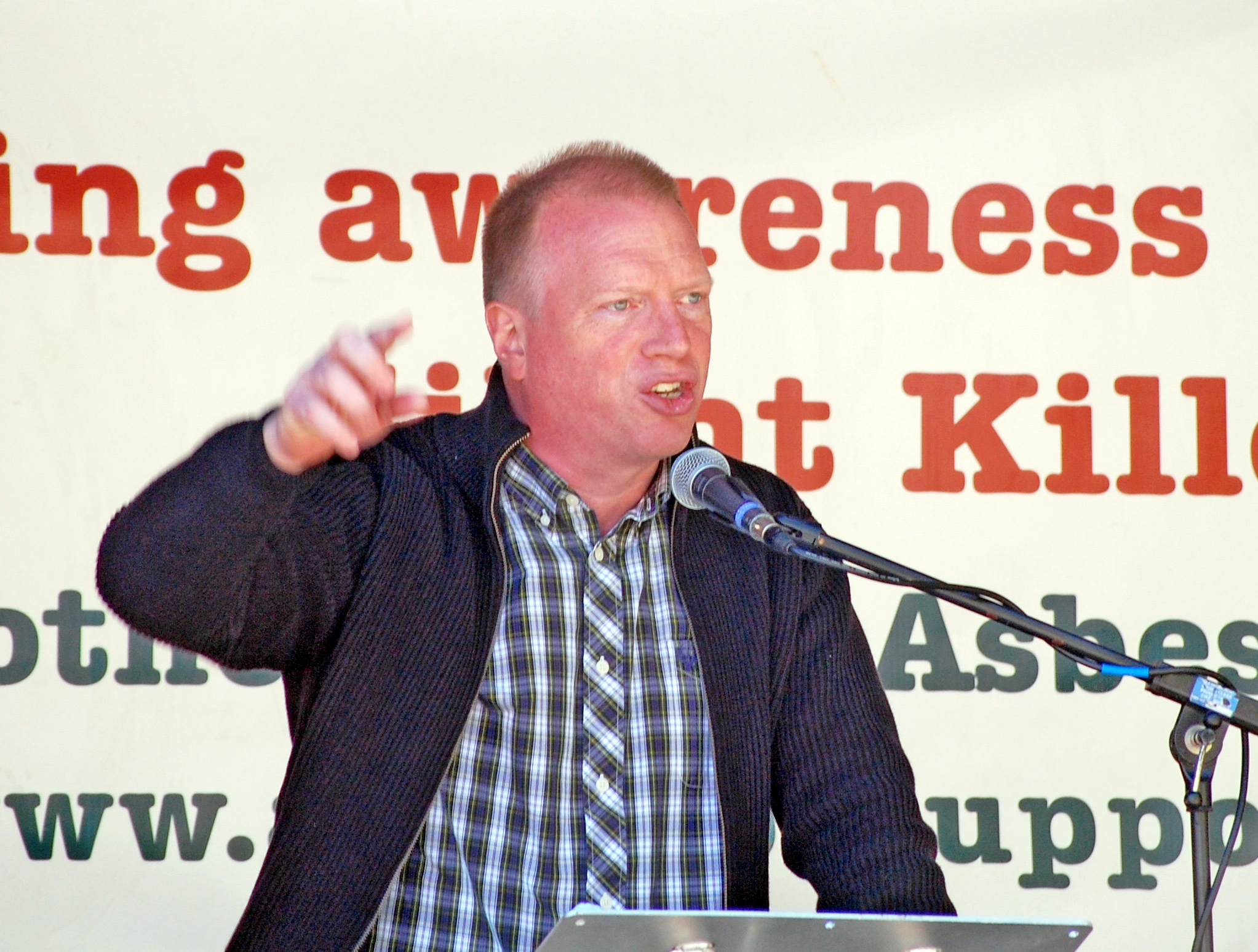
Matt Wrack in 2011

Wrack was involved in various rank and file and left wing groupings within the FBU, including the Fire Brigades Broad Left (FBBL) which also involved the then union president, Ronnie Scott. The FBBL emerged with the background of the 1984/85 miners strike and during campaigns against the abolition of metropolitan county councils by the then Conservative government. The FBBL produced the bulletin Guideline between 1984 and 1989. Between 1991 and 1995, Wrack helped produce and edit Flame, a bulletin of Militant supporters within the fire service.

In January 2025, Matt Wrack lost his bid for re-election as general secretary to the union's vice-president, Steve Wright, by 1,752 votes. However, later the FBU discovered the independent scrutineer had never sent ballot papers to 3,059 members, more than the majority, which could have required the election be rerun. Wrack decided not to stand again, saving the FBU from rerunning the election. In March 2025, the NASUWT executive endorsed Wrack as a candidate for election as general secretary.

=== Homerton 11 ===
In early 2000, Wrack was closely involved in the campaign around the FBU Homerton 11, eleven members who were suspended from work and disciplined by the London Fire Brigade management. The campaign by the FBU involved representation at the disciplinary cases and a workplace campaign to organise opposition and prepare for industrial action. Wrack and Andy Dark (current FBU Assistant General Secretary) acted as the principal disciplinary representatives whilst also working to build the wider campaign. Despite initial threats of dismissal, none of the eleven was dismissed and the campaign proved a turning point for the FBU in London in advance of the 2002/3 pay dispute.

=== 2002/03 fire service pay dispute and election as general secretary ===
Wrack was the FBU London Regional Organiser during the 2002/3 industrial dispute over pay. He became a leading critic of the strategy followed by the FBU leadership at the time. After being elected London Regional Secretary in 2004, he was elected Assistant General Secretary in 2005. Wrack then defeated incumbent General Secretary Andy Gilchrist on 5 May 2005 after Gilchrist had served one five-year term. This followed widespread discontent over the settlement reached by Gilchrist with the government that ended the 2002-03 pay dispute. The election was marred by ill feeling arising from the recent strikes. Wrack won 63.9% (12,883 votes) of the vote.

Wrack stood for re-election in 2010 and was challenged by John McGhee, a longstanding ally of former general secretary Andy Gilchrist. Wrack was re-elected. He was elected to the General Council of the Trades Union Congress in 2006 and has been re-elected since. He was subsequently elected onto the TUC executive committee. He was returned unopposed for a third term as FBU general secretary in 2014.

=== Strikes over fire service 'modernisation' ===
In the years following Wrack's election the FBU saw an unprecedented number of local disputes as employers embarked on various 'modernisation' schemes which saw changes to shift systems and cuts to jobs number in local fire and rescue services. These included strikes in Suffolk, West Midlands, and Hertfordshire. The Hertfordshire dispute saw the decision of the Labour government to provide no military cover during industrial action, a decision which would have significant impact on future fire service industrial disputes. Strike action in Merseyside in 2006 led to an accusation from the Chief Fire Officers Association (CFOA) that the union was pursuing a political agenda in an attempt to disrupt 'modernisation'.

In 2009 South Yorkshire Fire and Rescue Service threatened to dismiss and re-employ the workforce in order to impose non-agreed shift arrangements. This led to a further strike. The same threat of dismissal and re-employment to impose shift changes also led to strikes in London in 2010. The campaign included some large-scale protests and confrontations with strike-breakers, including incidents in which two FBU members were injured.

=== Pensions dispute with the coalition government ===
The general election of 2010 saw the creation of the coalition government. A central plank of its programme was the introduction of changes to public sector pensions. The FBU developed a campaign focused both on issues of fairness but also arguments around the needs of firefighting as an occupation and, in particular, the physical fitness standards which were required as a result. The FBU balloted members in 2013 and a 78% Yes vote was returned for strike action. The subsequent dispute was the longest in the history of the FBU. The campaign resulted in Parliamentary debate in December 2014, after the Labour front bench agreed to support a challenge to the new firefighter pension regulations.

Following the loss of the vote in Parliament, the FBU called a further strike in February 2015. This was accompanied by a mass rally which saw Parliament Square and Downing Street taken over by the protesters. The FBU held a recall Conference to debate options. No further strike action was called. After the election of the Conservative government in May 2015 the FBU launched a legal challenge over the changes, alleging age discrimination in the way 'transitional protection' arrangements were introduced.

=== Fire and rescue service campaigns and major incidents ===
In 2008, Wrack launched a new report for the FBU on firefighter deaths in the line of duty. This was accompanied by a lobby of Parliament. This was followed by a series of reports addressing challenges facing the fire and rescue service. These included reports into attacks on firefighters, floods (2007 and 2015), and on the fire service role in relation to climate change. The FBU also challenged what it claimed to be a simplistic cost base approach of the Audit Commission to fire service matters.

The FBU also challenged the drift toward increasing emergency response times across UK fire and rescue services. Through these, Wrack and the FBU argued that the shift towards 'localism' and the ending of national standards and inspection were creating an increasingly fragmented fire and rescue service. This was an issue Wrack had addressed in a 2008 lecture to the Centre for Research in Employment Studies at the University of Hertfordshire.

In December 2006 an explosion and fire took place at a fireworks storage facility at Marlie Farm in East Sussex. Two employees of East Sussex Fire and Rescue Service were killed and a number injured. The FBU launched cases for compensation on behalf of the family of one of the deceased, Brian Wembridge, and on behalf of the injured firefighters. Despite losing the case in court, East Sussex Fire and Rescue Service continued to refuse payment of compensation and appealed against the decision. Wrack condemned this move and the FBU launched a campaign for the appeal to be dropped and compensation paid in relation to those killed or injured at the incident.

=== Austerity, cuts and public ownership ===
Wrack has participated in the various campaigns against austerity since the election of the coalition government at the 2010 general election. While much of the left has focused on tax avoidance, Wrack has argued for an approach which also addresses issues of ownership of the economy. The FBU published pamphlets on public ownership of the banks and public ownership of the energy companies. Wrack successfully moved a motion at the TUC in 2012 calling for public ownership of the banks and financial services sector, the first time such a motion had been carried by the TUC in its history.

=== Climate change ===
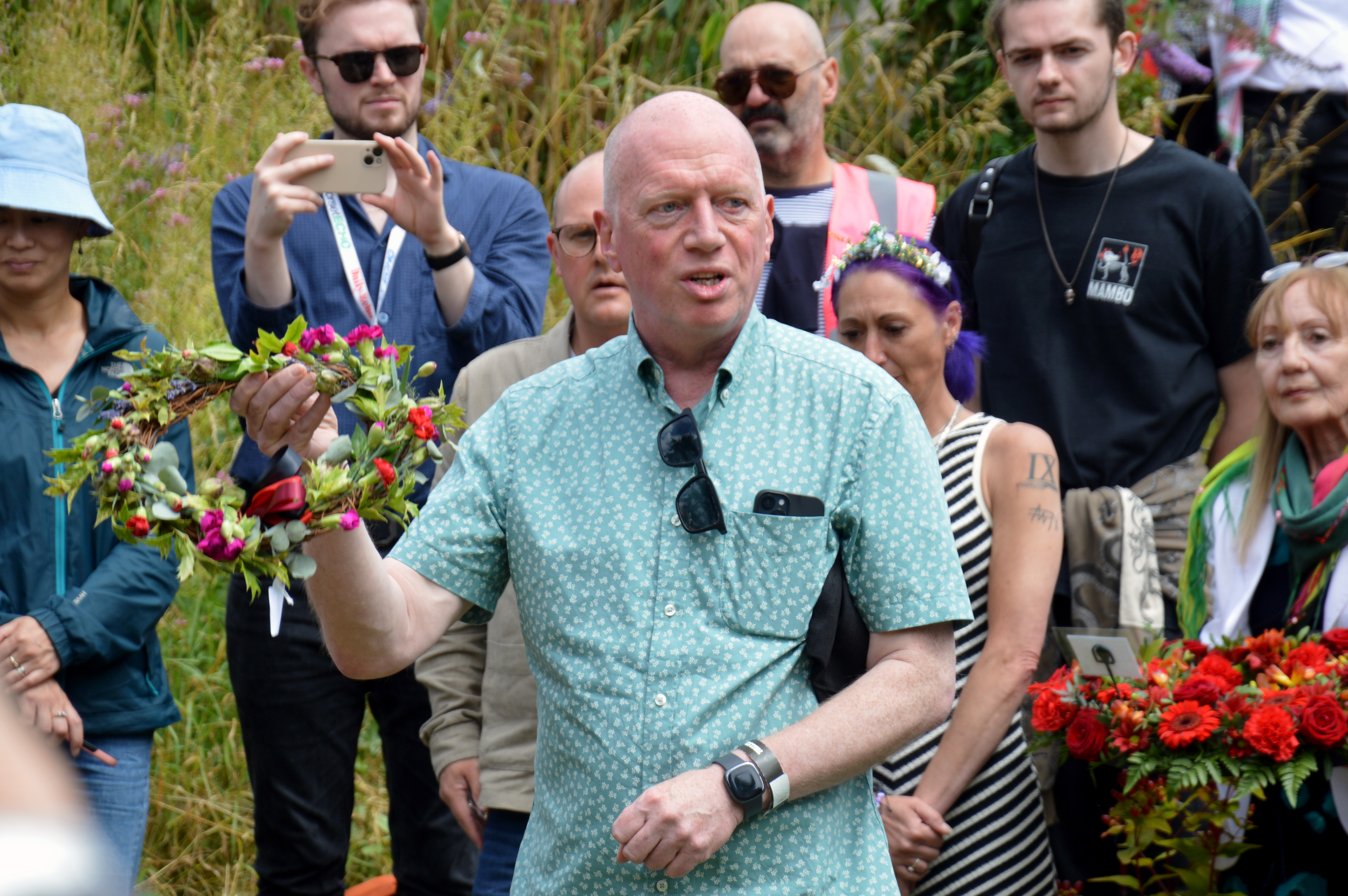
Matt Wrack at the 2024 Tolpuddle Martyrs' Festival

Wrack spoke at the 2008 Campaign for Climate Change trade union conference and at the Time to Act demonstration on climate change in March 2015. Wrack led the FBUs response to the 2007 and 2013-14 floods, calling for a statutory duty on the FRS in England and Wales on flooding. Wrack commissioned two FBU reports on flooding in 2008 (for the Pitt Review) and in 2014 as well as the union's own climate change report in 2010.

=== Salary and Solidarity fund ===
Wrack pledged prior to election to take a salary "based on average earnings of FBU members". The salary of the FBU general secretary is set by the union's executive council and endorsed by the union's conference. It is based on a direct link to an Area Manager within the fire and rescue service, so that any pay rises reflect those agreed on behalf of FBU members. In order to meet his election pledge, Wrack has set aside a portion of his salary and placed it into a separate fund which is used to support trade union and labour movement campaigns, hardship funds, initiatives in the UK and around the world. Wrack was interviewed about his stance on his salary for a BBC Radio 4 documentary in 2015.

== General Secretary of NASUWT ==
On 22 April 2025, Wrack was announced as the next general secretary of the NASUWT teaching union. However on 25 April the NASUWT decided to re-run the election following a legal challenge over the exclusion of other candidates in the nomination process. Nominations were reopened until 26 May, with Wrack as "acting general secretary" during the new election process. He remained the nominee of the union national executive for general secretary. He was permanently elected on 23 July, following an election.

In 2026, Wrack started a campaign to lengthen fully paid maternity pay for teachers from 4 weeks, which it had been for over 25 years, to 26 weeks, and to improve paternity pay.

== Personal life ==
Wrack was born in Manchester but has lived in east London since 1981. He has been described as "fiercely protective of his private life". He lives in Leytonstone, East London with his family. In 2025 he was reported to be in a relationship with Labour MP Mary Foy.

He is the brother of barrister Nick Wrack, a former national council member of Respect Party expelled from the British Socialist Workers Party during the 2007 Respect split, member of Haldane Society of Socialist Lawyers' executive committee between 1998 and 2001 and of Momentum's national committee from 2016.

Trade union offices
Preceded by Andy Gilchrist	General Secretary of the Fire Brigades Union; 2005–2025	Succeeded by Steve Wright
Preceded by Bob Crow	Chair of the Trades Union Councils' Joint Consultative Committee; 2014–2020	Succeeded by Steve Gillan
Preceded by Maria Exall	President of the Trades Union Congress; 2023–2024	Succeeded by Mark Dickinson
Preceded by Patrick Roach	General Secretary of NASUWT; 2025–present	Succeeded by
