= 2002–2003 United Kingdom firefighter dispute =

Nationwide strike action by UK firefighters for improved salaries

2002-2003 United Kingdom firefighter dispute
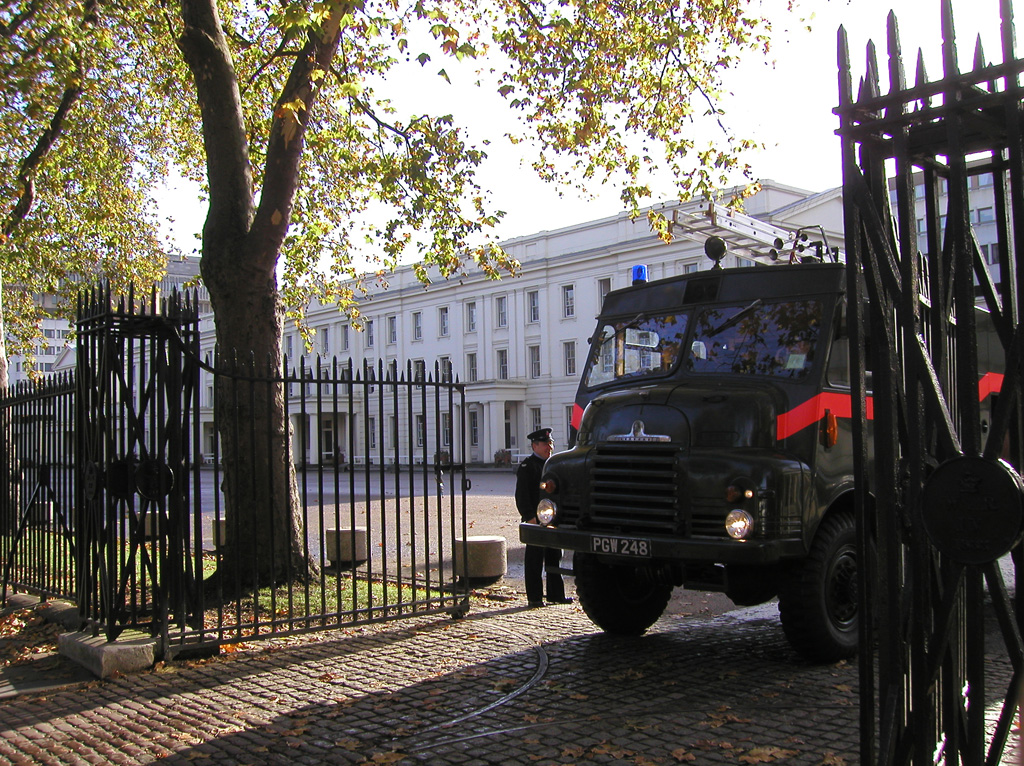
- Green Goddess emerging from Wellington Barracks in November 2002
- Date: 13 November 2002 – 12 June 2003 (6 months, 4 weeks and 2 days)
- Location: United Kingdom
- Caused by: Disagreements over labour contract between union and local authorities
- Result: 16% pay rise for three years agreed; Andy Gilchrist voted out as FBU General Secretary, replaced by Matt Wrack; Legislation passed allowing military to commandeer fire appliances from striking firefighters

Parties
Fire Brigades Union	HM Government; British Armed Forces

Lead figures
Andy Gilchrist	Tony Blair; John Prescott

The 2002–2003 UK firefighter dispute was a period of nationwide strike action which began when the Fire Brigades Union (FBU) voted to strike in an attempt to secure better salaries. The FBU demanded a 39 percent increase in pay, which would have brought the average firefighter's wage to around £30,000 (equivalent to £55,619 in 2025). It balloted its members for a strike in late 2002 and the industrial action began in November. It was the first nationwide firefighters' strike in the UK since 1977. The strike was led by FBU General Secretary Andy Gilchrist.

== Background ==
Local authorities recommended a pay increase of 4%, whilst an independent review advised 11%. The FBU rejected both of these requesting 40%. The government argued that this could result in substantially higher wages across the public sector and tax increases. The Independent Review of the Fire Service (known as the "Bain Review") proposed increasing salaries, on condition that the fire service was reformed and modernised. Recommendations included improving fire service leadership, encouraging closer relations with the central and local governments, and giving firefighters paramedic training.

The last nationwide firefighters' strike occurred between 1977 and early 1978, months prior to the Winter of Discontent. This was also a dispute about firefighters' pay, with the FBU demanding a 30% pay increase over a recommended 10% increase, and resulted in the armed forces being deployed to cover the striking firefighters. The strike ended after two months when FBU eventually accepted the 10% pay increase, having lost the backing of the Trades Union Congress and the support of the public.

== Strike action ==
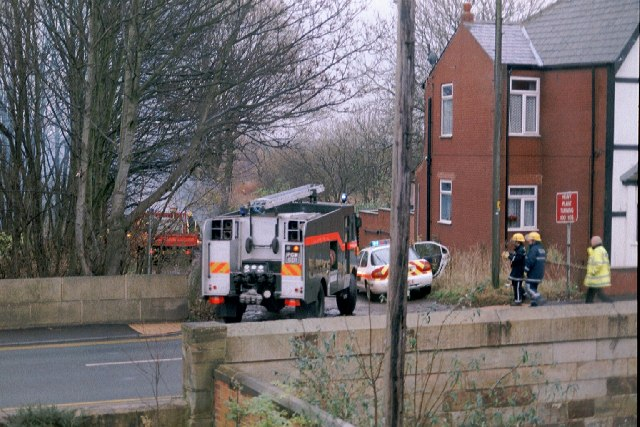
Armed forces firefighters with a Green Goddess in Ince-in-Makerfield, Greater Manchester in December 2002

The first few weeks of the planned action were postponed while negotiation took place. The first period, a two-day strike, began at 18:00 hrs GMT, on Wednesday 13 November and ended at 18:00 on Friday 15 November. In the event that reconciliation could not be brokered, further industrial action was planned.

The armed forces provided emergency cover during the strike by activating Operation Fresco, using Bedford RLHZ 'Green Goddess' fire engines, originally produced for the Auxiliary Fire Service for use following a nuclear attack on the United Kingdom, as well as a handful of modern appliances held in reserve. The armed forces also fielded small breathing apparatus rescue teams (BART) and rescue equipment support teams (REST) headed by professional firefighters of the RAF and staffed by specially trained members of all three services. Police officers escorted responding armed forces personnel to emergency callouts; Deputy Prime Minister John Prescott was criticised for hypocrisy by members of the FBU for offering increased overtime payments to police officers and armed forces personnel undertaking these duties.

Each side placed the responsibility entirely with the other; the FBU said that their employers' failure to meet their demands was the cause of the strike. Prime Minister Tony Blair criticised the strike as "wrong and dangerous" and warned the FBU that lives could be lost the lack of a prompt response by emergency services. 19,000 armed forces personnel were deployed to cover for striking firefighters, with fears being raised that the deployment would impact British forces' intervention in the upcoming invasion of Iraq. There were numerous examples of striking firefighters responding to emergency calls from the picket line and several rescues were made in this way.

== Negotiations ==
The first few weeks of the planned action were postponed while negotiation took place. The FBU rejected an offer that would amount to 11 percent over two years from a review body headed by Sir George Bain, and were unwilling to accept reforms to their working conditions. The FBU was widely criticised for its initial demand for a 40 percent pay-rise for both firefighters and support workers; indeed, it refused to abandon this demand despite mounting public disquiet concerning the FBU's stance.

On 19 March 2003, leaders of the FBU and negotiators for the local authority employers reached a provisional agreement based on a three-year pay settlement and an understanding that modernisation measures would be subject to some measure of local negotiation. However this was voted down by local area FBU representatives the following day. On 20 March 2003, Paul Woolstenholmes, an FBU official in Suffolk set up a political party, Firefighters Against Cuts. However this did not develop, with only a handful of candidates contesting seats in Suffolk Coastal, East Renfrewshire and South Ayrshire.

On 12 June 2003 at an FBU conference in Glasgow, the dispute ended with the firefighters accepting a pay deal worth 16% over three years linked to changes to working conditions. The deal was branded a disappointment by delegates, with some voting for the pay deal to avoid one being imposed on them by the government.

== Legacy ==
Tensions were raised again in 2004, when the FBU and local authority employers clashed over whether the deal brokered in 2003 was being honoured. Unofficial strikes took place in some fire brigades and military personnel were again readied to cover striking firefighters, however this round of negotiations was settled without recourse to industrial action in August of that year.

Disaffection with the FBU leadership after these disputes led to Andy Gilchrist being voted out of office by union members in 2005, being replaced by Matt Wrack.

Further strike action and work stoppages on a smaller scale would be carried out by regional members of the FBU in individual fire brigades. 5,500 firefighters from the London Fire Brigade walked out on strike over two nights in 2010 in a dispute over new contracts. A third 47-hour walkout on Bonfire Night was later called off by the FBU, while private contractors operating the 27 fire engines made available during the strike complained of intimidation by picketing firefighters. Two striking firefighters were injured in separate hit-and-run incidents outside of their fire stations, with one firefighter hit by a fire engine, resulting in two arrests.

The antiquated Bedford RLHZ 'Green Goddess' fire engines employed by the armed forces were criticised for their lack of speed, water capacity and modern equipment throughout the strike. Subsequent legislation introduced after the strike would demand striking fire brigades make their fire engines available to the armed forces, rendering the 'Green Goddess' appliances redundant; the fleet of over 1,000 appliances began to be sold off in 2005, with many 'Green Goddess' appliances being sold to developing countries.

== See also ==
- Fire services in the United Kingdom
- Independent Review of the Fire Service
