= Paul Brooks (cricketer) =

English cricketer

Personal information
- Full name: Paul Wilson Brooks
- Born: 28 May 1921; Marylebone, London, England
- Died: 26 January 1946 (aged 24); Paddington, London, England
- Nickname: Mr
- Batting: Left-handed
- Bowling: Left-arm fast-medium

Domestic team information
- Years: Team
- 1939: Middlesex

Career statistics
Competition	First-class
Matches	1
Runs scored	44
Batting average	–
100s/50s	–/–
Top score	44*
Balls bowled	–
Wickets	–
Bowling average	–
5 wickets in innings	–
10 wickets in match	–
Best bowling	–
Catches/stumpings	–/–
- Source: Cricinfo, 14 April 2012

Paul Wilson Brooks (28 May 1921 – 26 January 1946) was an English cricketer. Brooks was a left-handed batsman who bowled left-arm fast-medium. The son of William James Brooks and Mabel Brooks, he was born at Marylebone, London.

Prior to appearing in first-class cricket, Wilson had played Second XI cricket for Middlesex, and on one notable occasion he bowled the Australian Don Bradman in a practice session at Lord's before the 1938 season began, making him a celebrity for a short time. The following year he made what was to be his only first-class appearance for Middlesex against Warwickshire in the County Championship at Lord's. This was the final first-class match played by Middlesex that season, and Brooks was drafted into the team after a number of regular players had been drafted into the armed services due to rising tensions with Germany. In a match which Middlesex won by an innings and 200 runs, Brooks batted once, scoring an unbeaten 44.

== Military career and death ==
During the early part of World War II he served in London and Coventry with the National Fire Service during the height of The Blitz. He later served in the Coldstream Guards, reaching the rank of lance corporal. While fighting in Italy in April 1945, Brooks was wounded in the spine by a sniper. He never recovered and was bedridden ever after, eventually dying of his injury at St Mary's Hospital, Paddington, on the night of 26 January 1946. He was laid to rest at Brompton Cemetery.
