= Secretary of State for Transport =

Member of the Cabinet of the United Kingdom

- Royal Arms of His Majesty's Government

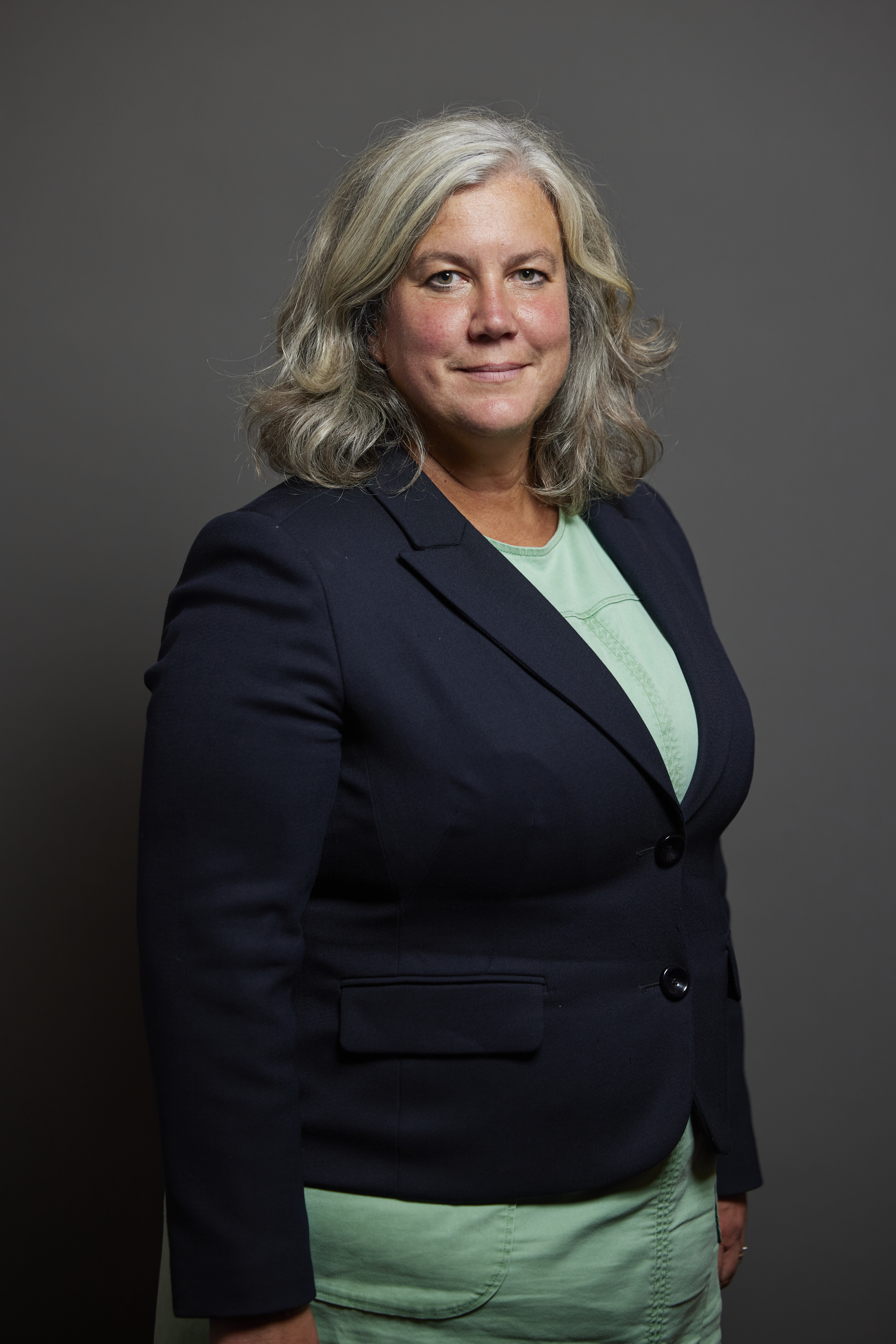
- Incumbent; Heidi Alexander since 29 November 2024
- Department for Transport
- Style: Transport Secretary (informal); The Right Honourable (within the UK and Commonwealth)
- Type: Minister of the Crown
- Status: Secretary of State
- Member of: Cabinet; Privy Council
- Reports to: The Prime Minister
- Seat: Westminster
- Nominator: The Prime Minister
- Appointer: The Monarch; (on the advice of the Prime Minister)
- Term length: At His Majesty's Pleasure
- Formation: 19 May 1919: (as Minister of Transport); 29 May 2002: (as Secretary of State for Transport)
- First holder: Eric Campbell Geddes (as Minister of Transport)
- Deputy: Minister of State for Transport
- Salary: £159,038 per annum (2022) (including £86,584 MP salary)
- Website: gov.uk/government/ministers/secretary-of-state-for-transport

- Applies to: England; United Kingdom (some reserved matters)
- Relates to: Department for Transport; Transport

Other UK counterparts
- Northern Ireland: Minister for Infrastructure
- Scotland: Cabinet Secretary for Economy, Transport and Tourism
- Wales: Cabinet Minister for Enterprise, Connectivity and Energy

The secretary of state for transport, also referred to as the transport secretary, is a secretary of state in the Government of the United Kingdom, with overall responsibility for the policies of the Department for Transport. The incumbent is a member of the Cabinet of the United Kingdom.

The office holder works alongside the other transport ministers. The corresponding shadow minister is the shadow secretary of state for transport, and the secretary of state is also scrutinised by the Transport Select Committee.

The position of secretary of state for transport is held by Heidi Alexander, who was appointed by Keir Starmer following the resignation of Louise Haigh.

== History ==
The Ministry of Transport absorbed the Ministry of Shipping and was renamed the Ministry of War Transport in 1941, but resumed its previous name at the end of the war.

The Ministry of Civil Aviation was created by Winston Churchill in 1944 to look at peaceful ways of using aircraft and to find something for the aircraft factories to do after the war. The new Conservative government in 1951 appointed the same minister to both Transport and Civil Aviation, finally amalgamating the ministries on 1 October 1953.

The ministry was renamed back to the Ministry of Transport on 14 October 1959, when a separate Ministry of Aviation was formed.

Transport responsibilities were subsumed by the Department for the Environment, headed by the Secretary of State for the Environment from 15 October 1970 to 10 September 1976.

The Department for Transport was recreated as a separate department by James Callaghan in 1976. The position was also incorporated as a corporation sole by the Secretary of State for Transport Order 1976 (SI 1976/1775).

The super-department Department of the Environment, Transport and the Regions was created in 1997 for Deputy Prime Minister John Prescott.

In 2001, the Department of the Environment, Transport and the Regions was widely considered unwieldy and so was broken up, with the Transport functions now combined with Local Government and the Regions in the DTLR (Department for Transport, Local Government and the Regions).

== List of ministers and secretaries of state ==
=== Minister of Transport (1919–1941) ===
Colour key (for political parties):
Conservative Labour National Labour Liberal National Liberal

Minister	Term of office		Political party	Prime Minister
Eric Campbell Geddes	19 May 1919	7 November 1921	Conservative	David Lloyd George (Coalition)
William Peel, 2nd Viscount Peel	7 November 1921	12 April 1922	Conservative	David Lloyd George (Coalition)
David Lindsay, 27th Earl of Crawford	12 April 1922	31 October 1922	Conservative	David Lloyd George (Coalition)
John Baird, 1st Viscount Stonehaven	31 October 1922	22 January 1924	Conservative	Bonar Law
John Baird, 1st Viscount Stonehaven	31 October 1922	22 January 1924	Conservative	Stanley Baldwin
Harry Gosling	24 January 1924	3 November 1924	Labour	Ramsay MacDonald
Wilfrid Ashley	11 November 1924	4 June 1929	Conservative	Stanley Baldwin
Herbert Morrison	7 June 1929	24 August 1931	Labour	Ramsay MacDonald
John Pybus	3 September 1931	22 February 1933	Liberal	Ramsay MacDonald (1st & 2nd National min.)
Oliver Stanley	22 February 1933	29 June 1934	Conservative	Ramsay MacDonald (1st & 2nd National min.)
Leslie Hore-Belisha	29 June 1934	28 May 1937	National Liberal	Ramsay MacDonald (1st & 2nd National min.)
Leslie Hore-Belisha	29 June 1934	28 May 1937	National Liberal	Stanley Baldwin (3rd National min.)
Leslie Burgin	28 May 1937	21 April 1939	National Liberal	Neville Chamberlain (4th National min.)
Euan Wallace	21 April 1939	14 May 1940	Conservative	Neville Chamberlain (War Coalition)
John Reith	14 May 1940	3 October 1940	National Independent	Winston Churchill (War Coalition)
John Moore-Brabazon	3 October 1940	1 May 1941	Conservative	Winston Churchill (War Coalition)

=== Minister of (War) Transport and Minister of Civil Aviation (1941–1953) ===
Colour key (for political parties):
Conservative Labour National Liberal

Minister of Transport	Minister of Civil Aviation	Term of office		Political party	Prime Minister
Frederick Leathers, 1st Viscount Leathers (Min. of War Transport)	—	1 May 1941	26 July 1945	Conservative	Winston Churchill (War Coalition)
Frederick Leathers, 1st Viscount Leathers (Min. of War Transport)	Philip Cunliffe-Lister, Viscount Swinton	8 October 1944	26 July 1945	Conservative	Winston Churchill (War Coalition)
Alfred Barnes	Reginald Fletcher, 1st Baron Winster	3–4 August 1945	4 October 1946	Labour	Clement Attlee
Alfred Barnes	Harry Nathan, 1st Baron Nathan	4 October 1946	31 May 1948	Labour	Clement Attlee
Alfred Barnes	Francis Pakenham, Lord Pakenham	31 May 1948	1 June 1951	Labour	Clement Attlee
Alfred Barnes	David Rees-Williams, 1st Baron Ogmore	1 June 1951	26 October 1951	Labour	Clement Attlee
John Maclay		31 October 1951	7 May 1952	National Liberal	Winston Churchill
Alan Lennox-Boyd		7 May 1952	1 October 1953	Conservative	Winston Churchill

=== Minister of Transport and Civil Aviation (1953–1959) ===
Colour key (for political parties):
Conservative

Minister	Term of office		Political party	Prime Minister
Alan Lennox-Boyd	1 October 1953	28 July 1954	Conservative	Winston Churchill
John Boyd-Carpenter	28 July 1954	20 December 1955	Conservative	Winston Churchill
Harold Watkinson	20 December 1955	14 October 1959	Conservative	Anthony Eden
Harold Watkinson	20 December 1955	14 October 1959	Conservative	Harold Macmillan

=== Minister of Transport (1959–1970) ===
Colour key (for political parties):
Conservative Labour

Minister	Term of office		Political party	Prime Minister
Ernest Marples	14 October 1959	16 October 1964	Conservative	Harold Macmillan
Ernest Marples	14 October 1959	16 October 1964	Conservative	Alec Douglas-Home
Thomas Fraser	16 October 1964	23 December 1965	Labour	Harold Wilson
Barbara Castle	23 December 1965	6 April 1968	Labour	Harold Wilson
Richard Marsh	6 April 1968	6 October 1969	Labour	Harold Wilson
Fred Mulley	6 October 1969	22 June 1970	Labour	Harold Wilson
John Peyton	23 June 1970	14 October 1970	Conservative	Edward Heath

=== Minister within the Department of the Environment (1970–1976) ===
Colour key (for political parties):
Conservative Labour

Minister	Term of office		Length of Term	Political party	Prime Minister
Peter Walker	15 October 1970	5 November 1972	2 years	Conservative	Edward Heath
Geoffrey Rippon	5 November 1972	4 March 1974	1 year, 3 months	Conservative	Edward Heath
Anthony Crosland	5 March 1974	8 April 1976	2 years, 1 month	Labour	Harold Wilson

The junior ministers responsible for transport within the Department for the Environment:

==== Minister for Transport Industries (1970–1974) ====
- John Peyton (Conservative, 15 October 1970 – 7 March 1974)

==== Minister for Transport (1974–1976) ====
- Fred Mulley (Labour, 7 March 1974 – 12 June 1975)
- John Gilbert (Labour, 12 June 1975 – 10 September 1976)

=== Secretary of State for Transport (1976–1979) ===
Colour key (for political parties):
Labour

Secretary of State	Term of office		Length of Term	Political party	Prime Minister
Bill Rodgers	10 September 1976	4 May 1979	2 years, 7 months	Labour	James Callaghan

=== Minister of Transport (1979–1981) ===
Not an official member of the cabinet.

Colour key (for political parties):
Conservative

Minister	Term of office		Length of Term	Political party	Prime Minister
Norman Fowler	11 May 1979	5 January 1981	1 year, 7 months	Conservative	Margaret Thatcher

=== Secretary of State for Transport (1981–1997) ===
Colour key (for political parties):
Conservative

Secretary of State	Term of office		Length of Term	Political party	Prime Minister
Norman Fowler	5 January 1981	14 September 1981	8 months	Conservative	Margaret Thatcher
David Howell	14 September 1981	11 June 1983	1 year, 8 months	Conservative	Margaret Thatcher
Tom King	11 June 1983	16 October 1983	4 months	Conservative	Margaret Thatcher
Nicholas Ridley	16 October 1983	21 May 1986	2 years, 7 months	Conservative	Margaret Thatcher
John Moore	21 May 1986	13 June 1987	1 year	Conservative	Margaret Thatcher
Paul Channon	13 June 1987	24 July 1989	2 years, 1 month	Conservative	Margaret Thatcher
Cecil Parkinson	24 July 1989	28 November 1990	1 year, 4 months	Conservative	Margaret Thatcher
Malcolm Rifkind	28 November 1990	10 April 1992	2 years, 8 months	Conservative	John Major
John MacGregor	11 April 1992	20 July 1994	2 years, 3 months	Conservative	John Major
Brian Mawhinney	20 July 1994	5 July 1995	11 months	Conservative	John Major
Sir George Young, 6th Baronet	5 July 1995	2 May 1997	1 year, 9 months	Conservative	John Major

=== Secretary of State for Environment, Transport and the Regions (1997–2001) ===
Colour key (for political parties):
Labour

Secretary of State	Term of office		Length of Term	Political party	Prime Minister
John Prescott; MP for Kingston upon Hull West and Hessle	2 May 1997	7 June 2001	4 years, 1 month	Labour	Tony Blair

=== Secretary of State for Transport, Local Government and the Regions (2001–2002) ===
Colour key (for political parties):
Labour

Secretary of State	Term of office		Length of Term	Political party	Prime Minister
Stephen Byers MP for North Tyneside	8 June 2001	28 May 2002	11 months	Labour	Tony Blair

After Byers' resignation, such a division was made, with the portfolios of Local Government and the Regions transferred to the Office of the Deputy Prime Minister.

During the lifetime of DTLGR, John Spellar served as Minister of State for Transport with a right to attend Cabinet.

- John Spellar (8 June 2001 – 29 May 2002)

=== Secretary of State for Transport (2002–present) ===
Colour key (for political parties):
Conservative Labour

Secretary of State	Term of office		Length of Term	Political party	Prime Minister
Alistair Darling; MP for Edinburgh South West	29 May 2002	5 May 2006	3 years, 11 months	Labour	Tony Blair
Douglas Alexander; MP for Paisley and South Renfrewshire	5 May 2006	28 June 2007	1 year, 1 month	Labour	Tony Blair
Ruth Kelly; MP for Bolton West	28 June 2007	5 October 2008	1 year, 3 months	Labour	Gordon Brown
Geoff Hoon; MP for Ashfield	5 October 2008	5 June 2009	8 months	Labour	Gordon Brown
Andrew Adonis, Baron Adonis	6 June 2009	6 May 2010	11 months	Labour	Gordon Brown
Philip Hammond; MP for Runnymede and Weybridge	12 May 2010	14 October 2011	1 year, 5 months	Conservative	David Cameron (Coalition)
Justine Greening; MP for Putney	14 October 2011	6 September 2012	10 months	Conservative	David Cameron (Coalition)
Patrick McLoughlin; MP for Derbyshire Dales	6 September 2012	14 July 2016	3 years, 10 months	Conservative	David Cameron (Coalition)
Patrick McLoughlin; MP for Derbyshire Dales	6 September 2012	14 July 2016	3 years, 10 months	Conservative	David Cameron (II)
Chris Grayling; MP for Epsom and Ewell	14 July 2016	24 July 2019	3 years, 10 days	Conservative	Theresa May
Grant Shapps; MP for Welwyn Hatfield	24 July 2019	6 September 2022	3 years, 1 month	Conservative	Boris Johnson
Anne-Marie Trevelyan; MP for Berwick-upon-Tweed	6 September 2022	25 October 2022	7 weeks	Conservative	Liz Truss
Mark Harper; MP for Forest of Dean	25 October 2022	5 July 2024	1 year, 8 months	Conservative	Rishi Sunak
Louise Haigh; MP for Sheffield Heeley	5 July 2024	29 November 2024	4 months	Labour	Keir Starmer
Heidi Alexander; MP for Swindon South	29 November 2024	Incumbent	1 year, 11 months and 20 days	Labour	Keir Starmer
Heidi Alexander; MP for Swindon South	29 November 2024	Incumbent	1 year, 11 months and 20 days	Labour	Andy Burnham

== See also ==
- Ministry of Civil Aviation Aerodrome Fire Service
