= Halesowen and Stourbridge =

UK Parliament constituency (1974–1997)

- Former borough constituency for the House of Commons
- County: West Midlands

February 1974–1997
- Seats: One
- Created from: Oldbury & Halesowen
- Replaced by: Stourbridge, Halesowen and Rowley Regis

Halesowen and Stourbridge was a parliamentary constituency in the West Midlands, which returned one Member of Parliament (MP) to the House of Commons of the Parliament of the United Kingdom from February 1974 until it was abolished for the 1997 general election.

Its territory was then divided between the new constituencies of Halesowen & Rowley Regis and Stourbridge, both of which were held by Labour upon creation, until 2010 when the Conservatives won both seats back and have continued to retain them to date.

== Boundaries ==
1974–1983: The Boroughs of Halesowen and Stourbridge.

1983–1997: The Borough of Dudley wards of Belle Vale and Hasbury, Halesowen North, Halesowen South, Hayley Green, Lye and Wollescote, Norton, Pedmore and Stourbridge East, and Wollaston and Stourbridge West.

== Members of Parliament ==
Election	Member	Party
Feb 1974	Sir John Stokes	Conservative
1992	Warren Hawksley	Conservative
1997	constituency abolished: see Stourbridge & Halesowen and Rowley Regis	

== Elections ==
=== Elections in the 1990s ===
General election 1992: Halesowen and Stourbridge
Party	Candidate	Votes	%	±%
Conservative	Warren Hawksley	32,312	50.6	+0.5
Labour	Alan Hankon	22,730	35.6	+7.8
Liberal Democrats	Vinod Sharma	7,941	12.4	−9.7
Green	Tim Weller	908	1.4	New
Majority		9,582	15.0	−7.3
Turnout		63,891	82.3	+2.9
Conservative hold		Swing	−3.7	

=== Elections in the 1980s ===
General election 1987: Halesowen and Stourbridge
Party	Candidate	Votes	%	±%
Conservative	John Stokes	31,037	50.12	+1.73
Labour	Timothy Sunter	17,229	27.82	+2.79
SDP	Dominic Simon	13,658	22.06	−3.53
Majority		13,808	22.30	
Turnout		61,924	79.37	
Conservative hold		Swing		

General election 1983: Halesowen and Stourbridge
Party	Candidate	Votes	%	±%
Conservative	John Stokes	28,520	48.39	−2.99
SDP	Thomas Clitheroe	14,934	25.58	+13.54
Labour	Colin Ellison	14,611	25.03	−10.17
Ecology	Derek Rudd	582	1.00	New
Majority		13,316	22.81	
Turnout		58,377	76.41	
Conservative hold		Swing		

=== Elections in the 1970s ===
General election 1979: Halesowen and Stourbridge
Party	Candidate	Votes	%	±%
Conservative	John Stokes	33,247	49.59	+10.63
Labour	Richard Alfred Etheridge	24,282	36.22	−1.39
Liberal	Christopher Harvey	8,597	12.82	−10.62
National Front	Stanley Frederick Goodwin	921	1.37	New
Majority		8,965	13.37	
Turnout		67,047	79.31	
Conservative hold		Swing	+6.01	

General election October 1974: Halesowen and Stourbridge
Party	Candidate	Votes	%	±%
Conservative	John Stokes	24,387	38.96	−0.94
Labour	Dennis Turner	23,537	37.60	+3.79
Liberal	Leonard Thomas Eden	14,672	23.44	−2.85
Majority		850	1.36	
Turnout		62,596	76.18	
Conservative hold		Swing	-2.37	

General election February 1974: Halesowen and Stourbridge
Party	Candidate	Votes	%	±%
Conservative	John Stokes	26,514	39.90	
Labour	Dennis Turner	22,465	33.81	
Liberal	Leonard Thomas Eden	17,471	26.29	
Majority		4,049	6.09	
Turnout		66,450	81.39	
Conservative win (new seat)				

== See also ==
- List of parliamentary constituencies in the West Midlands (county)
