= Andy Gilchrist =

British firefighter and unionist

Andrew Charles Gilchrist
- Born: 5 December 1960 (age 65)
- Occupation: Trade Unionist
- Known for: General Secretary of the Fire Brigades Union (2000-05)

Andrew Charles Gilchrist (born 5 December 1960) is a British trade unionist and former firefighter who served as the General Secretary of the Fire Brigades Union from 2000 to 2005.

== Early life ==
Gilchrist was born the son of Edward and Shirley Gilchrist. He was educated at Bedford Modern School.

== Career ==
Gilchrist started his career at the Bedfordshire and Luton Fire and Rescue Service, where he worked from 1979 until 1996. As a member of the Fire Brigades Union, he became a member of the executive council in 1993, a position he held until 2000. He was a national officer from 1996 to 2000 and General Secretary from 2000 to 2005, leading the FBU through the 2002-2003 UK firefighter dispute before he was voted out in favour of Matt Wrack in 2005.

Gilchrist was a Member of the General Council of the Trades Union Congress from 2000 to 2005 and a member of the International Brotherhood of Teamsters from 2006 to 2008. Since 2010 he has been the National Education Officer at the National Union of Rail, Maritime and Transport Workers.

== Phone hacking scandal ==
Gilchrist was a victim of the News International phone hacking scandal.

== Family life ==
Gilchrist married Loretta Borman in 1985 and they have a son (Alexander Mark Gilchrist) and a daughter (Scarlett Faye Gilchrist).

Trade union offices
Preceded by Ken Cameron	General Secretary of the Fire Brigades Union; 2000 – 2005	Succeeded by Matt Wrack
