= Aylmer Firebrace =

Royal Navy officer and firefighter

Sir Aylmer Firebrace
- Portrait by George Harcourt, 1945

Chief of the Fire Staff (National Fire Service)
- In office 18 August 1941 – 28 February 1947
- Preceded by: Position established
- Succeeded by: Position abolished

Chief Officer of the London Fire Brigade
- In office June 1938 – 18 August 1941
- Preceded by: Cyril Morris
- Succeeded by: Himself, as part of the NFS

Personal details
- Born: Aylmer Newton George Firebrace; 17 June 1886 Southsea, Hampshire, England
- Died: 8 June 1972 (aged 85) St George's Hospital, Westminster, London
- Awards: Commander of the Order of the British Empire (CBE)
- Military career
- Allegiance: United Kingdom
- Branch: Royal Navy
- Service years: 1901–1919
- Rank: Commander
- Conflicts: World War I: Battle of Jutland
- Awards: Bronze Medal, Royal Humane Society

Commander Sir Aylmer Newton George Firebrace, CBE, KPM (17 June 1886 – 8 June 1972) was a British Royal Navy officer and fire chief. As a Royal Navy officer, he saw active service in World War I and participated in the Battle of Jutland. Following the war, he joined the London Fire Brigade and rose to become its Commander. With the creation of the National Fire Service, he became the first and only person to head firefighting across the whole of Great Britain.

== Early life ==
Firebrace was born on 17 June 1886 in Southsea, Hampshire, England. He was the son of George Firebrace, lieutenant colonel in the Royal Artillery, and his wife Agnes Adela Firebrace (born Porter). His younger brother was the astrologer Brigadier Roy Firebrace. He was educated at HMS Britannia.

== Military career ==
Following his education on HMS Britannia, he was in May 1902 appointed as a Naval Cadet on board the battleship HMS Bulwark, flagship of the Mediterranean Fleet On 30 July 1905, he was confirmed in the rank of sub-lieutenant. He was promoted to lieutenant on 30 July 1906. In 1912, he was serving on the Invincible-class battlecruiser HMS Indomitable.

He saw active service during World War I. He served on HMS Centurion, a King George V-class battleship, during the Battle of Jutland in 1916, as a gunnery officer. In 1917, he was promoted to commander. He ended the war as commander of the Chatham Dockyard gunnery school.

He left the Royal Navy on 31 August 1919 at the age of 33.

== Fire service career ==
Following the end of World War I, there were limited opportunities in the peacetime Royal Navy. In 1919, Firebrace applied to the London Fire Brigade originally for the post of chief officer but instead was appointed to the lower position of principal officer. He was promoted to divisional officer in 1920 and senior divisional officer in 1933. He recruited John Horner in 1933 and set him on the road to fast track promotion. He would go on to become the general secretary of the Fire Brigades Union. He was promoted to deputy chief in 1936, and finally to chief officer in June 1938.

In January 1939, he was seconded to the Home Office to prepare plans to co-ordinate the London Region's sixty-six fire brigades. On the outbreak of World War II, he was appointed regional fire officer, London Region. This posting was purely administrative and prevented him from operationally commanding the region's fire brigades. He was once more seconded to the Home Office in May 1941; The Blitz had demonstrated that the localised system of fire brigades handicapped an otherwise efficient fire service and needed to be remedied. In August 1941, the National Fire Service was created and replaced the existing 1,600 British local authority fire brigades. He was appointed to the dual-hatted roles of Chief of the Fire Staff and Inspector-in-Chief of the Fire Services; becoming the first and only person to head all fire fighting in Great Britain. At peak strength, he led approximately 370,000 personnel. These included 80,000 women, as he was a strong supporter of the employment of women.

He retired on 28 February 1947, after which the National Fire Service was split up into brigades under local authority control.

== Later life ==
In his retirement, Firebrace occupied himself with writing. His autobiography titled Fire Service Memories was published in 1948. He then concerned himself with Christian theology writing three books; If thou criest after Knowledge in 1952, Light on the Gospel of John in 1957 and The Revelation to John in 1963.

He died on 8 June 1972 at St George's Hospital, Westminster, London.

== Personal life ==
On 26 October 1912, Firebrace married Dorothy Vernon Grey, daughter of civil engineer Douglas Grey. Together they had a son and a daughter. His wife predeceased him, dying in 1952.

== Honours ==
In 1918, he was awarded the Bronze Medal by the Royal Humane Society. This medal is "awarded to people who have put their own lives at great risk to save or attempt to save someone else". He was awarded the King's Police Medal "for Distinguished Service" in the 1938 New Year Honours.

In the 1941 New Year Honours, Firebrace was appointed Commander of the Order of the British Empire (CBE). On 24 December 1941, he was appointed Officer of the Venerable Order of Saint John (OStJ). In the 1945 New Year Honours, it was announced that he was to be knighted as Knight Bachelor. On 13 February 1945, he was knighted at Buckingham Palace by King George VI. He was appointed Commander of the Order of St. Olav by the King of Norway "in recognition of services during the war".
