= Jim Bradley (trade unionist) =

British trade unionist (1867–1929)

James Joseph William Bradley (6 May 1867 – 17 March 1929) was a trade unionist and General Secretary of the Fireman's Trade Union (now Fire Brigades Union) in the United Kingdom.

Bradley was the son of an engineer and station officer in London Fire Brigade. A park keeper, he became branch secretary of the Bethnal Green Municipal Employees' Association (MEA) and became a member of the executive only to split away in 1907 and help launch the National Union of Corporation Workers, (NUCW) of which he was to become president.

== Firemen's trade unionism ==
In 1913, Bradley recruited the MEA's London Fire Brigade branch to NUCW and became its branch secretary. After the conclusion of a dispute with London County Council, the branch split from the NUCW and instead affiliated with George Gamble's Firemen's Trade Union. Gamble left the union in 1922, and Bradley took over as General Secretary of the union, a position he held until his death.

== Political career ==
Bradley was a founder member of Bethnal Green Labour Party and stood for Bethnal Green council in 1908, although he was not successful in that until after the First World War when he was also elected to the local Board of Guardians. He later stood independently for London County Council in 1928 with assistance from the Communist Party.

Trade union offices
Preceded by George Gamble	General Secretary of the Fire Brigades Union; 1922–1929	Succeeded by Percy Kingdom
