= Coal trimmer =

Worker who evenly distributes coal in ships

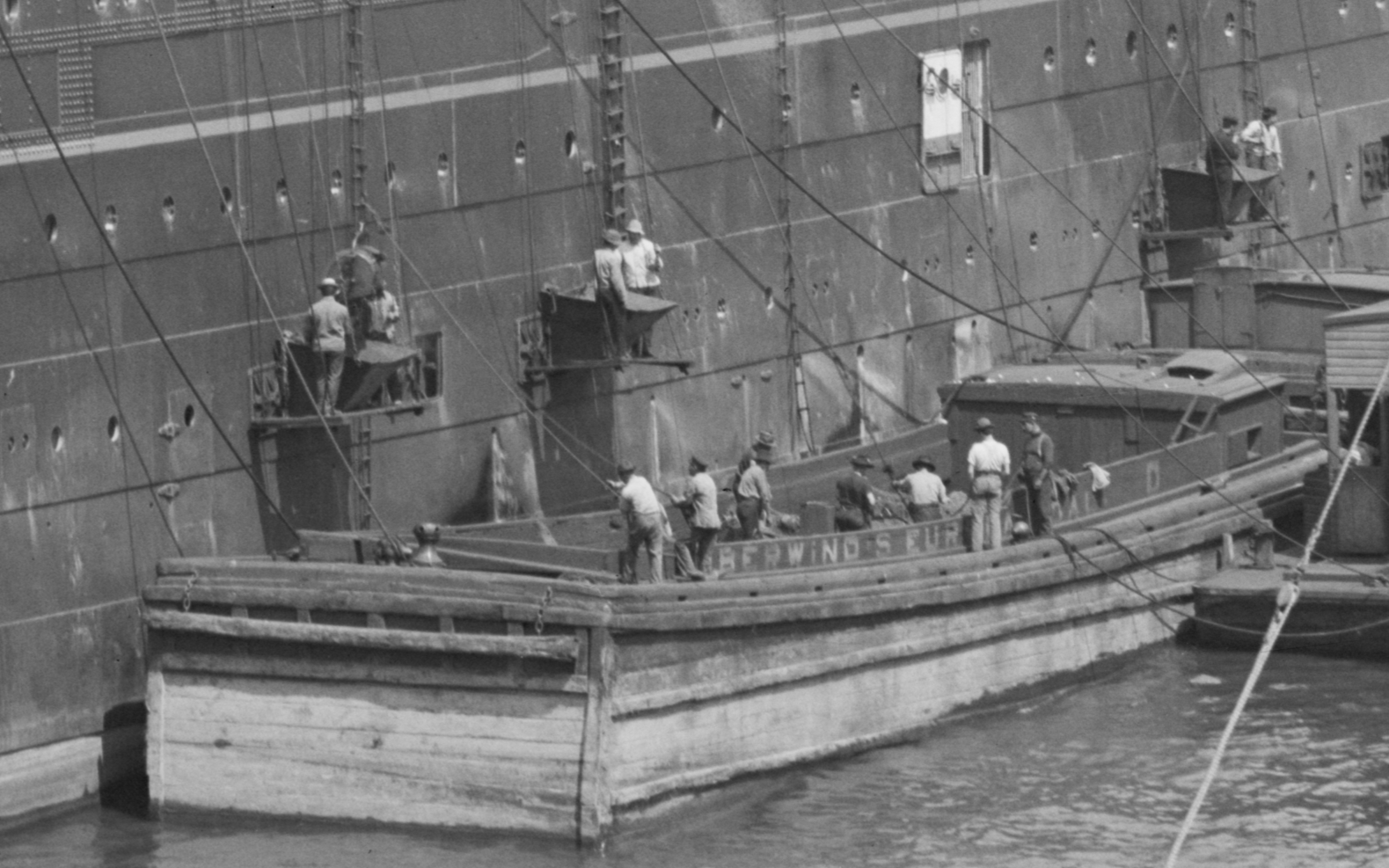
Coal trimmers bunkering the ocean liner Rotterdam in the port of Hoboken, New Jersey, about 1908

A coal trimmer or trimmer is a position within the engineering department of a coal-fired steamship that involves all coal handling duties. Their main task is to ensure that coal is evenly distributed within a ship to ensure it remains trim in the water. Their efforts to control the fore-and-aft angle at which a ship floats are why they are called “trimmers”. Without proper management of the coal bunkers, ships could easily list due to uneven distribution of the coal.

The role of trimmers starts with the bunkering of coal, distributing it evenly within the bunkers, and then providing a consistent delivery of coal to the stoker or fireman working the vessel's boilers.

Coal trimming was also a role based at the docks that involved levelling out the coal in a ship's hold to ensure that the ship was safe to travel. Coal was transported to the docks on railway wagons, and the coal was tipped into the ship. As the coal was loaded into a hold of the ship it would form a conical pile. This was unsafe for the ship to sail in case the coal moved to one side, causing the ship to list and roll.

Trimmers shovelled the coal out so that it was level and the ship was safe. It was a difficult job in dark and dangerous conditions.

== Role ==
Within the engineering crew, trimmers had one of the hardest and lowest paid jobs. Working conditions were hard because they worked directly inside the coal bunkers, which were poorly lit, full of coal dust, and very hot as they were on top of or between the boilers.

Trimmers used shovels and wheelbarrows to move coal around the bunkers in order to keep the coal level, and to shovel the coal down the coal chute to the firemen below who fueled the furnaces.

Trimmers were also involved in extinguishing fires in the coal bunkers. Fires were frequent due to spontaneous combustion of the coal. They had to be extinguished with fire hoses and by removing the burning coal by feeding it into the furnace.

Coal trimmers worked on various docks in the UK in the early part of the 20th century. They were skilled at their job and in some areas of the country formed unions such as the Cardiff, Penarth and Barry Coal Trimmers' Union.

== Notable coal trimmers ==
- There were 73 trimmers aboard the coal-fired ocean liner RMS Titanic. During the sinking of the ship, they disregarded their own safety and stayed below deck to help keep the steam-driven electric generators running for the water pumps and lighting. Only 20 trimmers survived.
- Torsten Billman, a Swedish graphic artist, illustrator, and mural painter – himself a coal trimmer and stoker on various merchant ships from 1926 to 1932 – has portrayed the hard work in coal bunkers and stokeholes.
- Frank Bailey, a Guyanese-British firefighter, was a coal trimmer.
- Peter MacCallum, Australian oncologist, worked his way from Australia to Britain as a coal trimmer to study medicine at the University of Edinburgh.
