= Oldbury and Halesowen =

Parliamentary constituency in the United Kingdom, 1950–1974

- Former borough constituency for the House of Commons

1950–February 1974
- Seats: one
- Created from: Stourbridge
- Replaced by: Halesowen & Stourbridge, Warley West

Oldbury and Halesowen was a parliamentary constituency in the West Midlands, which returned one Member of Parliament (MP) to the House of Commons of the Parliament of the United Kingdom from 1950 until it was abolished for the February 1974 general election.

It was created from the eastern section of the Stourbridge constituency, which was reduced substantially in size, as a result of the recent population growth in both Oldbury and Halesowen.

It was then partly replaced by the new Halesowen and Stourbridge constituency, with the Oldbury area becoming part of Warley West.

== Boundaries ==
The Boroughs of Halesowen and Oldbury.

== Members of Parliament ==
Election	Member	Party
1950	Arthur Moyle	Labour
1964	John Horner	Labour
1970	John Stokes	Conservative
Feb 1974	constituency abolished	

== Elections ==
=== Elections in the 1950s ===
Arthur Moyle had been elected the Member of Parliament for the Stourbridge constituency at the 1945 general election. Since 1946 he had served as Parliamentary Private Secretary to Clement Attlee. The turnout in 1950 proved to be the highest over the lifetime of the constituency.

General election 1950: Oldbury and Halesowen
Party	Candidate	Votes	%	±%
Labour	Arthur Moyle	28,379	50.42	
Conservative	Laurence Cecil Baxter	17,281	30.71	
Liberal	Ralph Kilner Brown	10,620	18.87	
Majority		11,098	19.71	
Turnout		56,640	86.28	
Labour win (new seat)				

The choice for voters in the 1951 election was between Labour or Conservative candidates following the withdrawal and non-replacement of the Liberal candidate. Arthur Moyle predicted the votes from those Liberal voters who cast their ballot would be shared equally between himself and his opponent. Walter Somers, managing director of the long established Somers forging firm of Halesowen was an Old Etonian and Oxford University graduate, born in Old Hill. Clement Attlee and Anthony Eden visited Halesowen in the run-up to the election.

General election 1951: Oldbury and Halesowen
Party	Candidate	Votes	%	±%
Labour	Arthur Moyle	30,610	55.71	
Conservative	Walter Lionel Osborne Somers	24,338	44.29	
Majority		6,272	11.42	
Turnout		54,948	83.29	
Labour hold		Swing		

General election 1955: Oldbury and Halesowen
Party	Candidate	Votes	%	±%
Labour	Arthur Moyle	24,123	46.07	
Conservative	Peter A Bridger	19,068	36.42	
Liberal	Derick Mirfin	9,171	17.51	New
Majority		5,055	9.65	
Turnout		52,362	78.60	
Labour hold		Swing		

The last Conservative challenger to incumbent Arthur Moyle was John Vernon, a director of Birmingham firm, Ash and Lacy and councillor for the Acocks Green ward.

General election 1959: Oldbury and Halesowen
Party	Candidate	Votes	%	±%
Labour	Arthur Moyle	23,861	42.85	
Conservative	John Fane Vernon	21,478	38.57	
Liberal	Derick Mirfin	10,343	18.58	
Majority		2,383	4.28	
Turnout		55,682	80.83	
Labour hold		Swing		

=== Elections in the 1960s ===
The constituency featured in a series of articles on marginal seats in the Birmingham Post ahead of the 1964 general election. The writer exclaimed that although one constituency, as far as its electors were concerned it was two "with little in common except the determination not to be identified with each other". Oldbury is described as quintessential industrial Black Country with its factory chimney stacks, while Halesowen is seen as more of a commuter town with many workers employed at the British Motor Corporation works at Longbridge. Philip Lugg, the Conservative Party candidate commented that 50 per cent of the workforce had connections with the steel industry and highlighted Labour's nationalisation policy. He, as well as the Labour and Liberal candidates saw housing as the main local issue. An unbiased forecast of the election result came from an Oldbury man who said "nobody is really certain who will win. The most you can say is that none of the candidates will lose his deposit".

General election 1964: Oldbury and Halesowen
Party	Candidate	Votes	%	±%
Labour	John Horner	22,099	40.56	
Conservative	Philip Harrison Lugg	21,182	38.87	
Liberal	Christopher Frederick Floris	11,210	20.57	
Majority		917	1.68	
Turnout		54,491	78.85	
Labour hold		Swing		

The 1966 general election saw a straight fight between the Labour and Conservative candidates. John Horner, who won the seat for Labour in 1964 was aged 54. He originated from the East End of London, was previously an officer in the Merchant Navy and had joined the London Fire Brigade. At the age of 27 he became leader of the Fire Brigades Union. Philip Lugg, again standing for the Conservatives, was aged 43, a local man born and educated in West Bromwich, who worked in the family firm of ironmongers. Both candidates tried to win over the swathe of Liberal voters from the general election held two years previously. Horner said the local issues were leasehold reform, rates, local government reform and housing. A prediction published on the eve of the poll showed a close result in favour of Labour.

General election 1966: Oldbury and Halesowen
Party	Candidate	Votes	%	±%
Labour	John Horner	28,490	53.24	
Conservative	Philip Harrison Lugg	25,020	46.76	
Majority		3,470	6.48	
Turnout		53,510	76.68	
Labour hold		Swing		

=== Elections in the 1970s ===
Voting intentions in the 1970 general election showed a swing towards the Conservatives and a prediction that for the first time in the history of the seat Labour would be defeated. Polling organisation, Marplan predicted a 4.2 per cent swing from Labour to Conservative. In response, John Horner said "our figures show a definite swing to Labour". Conservative challenger, John Stokes was confident the poll confirmed his party's findings that he would win the constituency by between 1,000 and 3,000 votes. Voters interviewed said the rising cost of living, maintaining employment and reducing taxation were the main issues.

General election 1970: Oldbury and Halesowen
Party	Candidate	Votes	%	±%
Conservative	John Stokes	29,403	52.60	
Labour	John Horner	26,499	47.40	
Majority		2,904	5.20	N/A
Turnout		55,902	72.09	
Conservative gain from Labour		Swing		
