= Warren Hawksley =

British politician

Philip Warren Hawksley

Member of Parliament for Halesowen and Stourbridge
- In office 9 April 1992 – 8 April 1997
- Preceded by: Sir John Stokes
- Succeeded by: Debra Shipley

Member of Parliament for The Wrekin
- In office 3 May 1979 – 18 May 1987
- Preceded by: Gerry Fowler
- Succeeded by: Bruce Grocott

Personal details
- Born: 10 March 1943 Oswestry, Shropshire, England
- Died: 9 March 2018 (aged 74) Fougères, Brittany, France
- Party: Conservative
- Spouse(s): 1. Cynthia Higgins (m. 1967; div.); 2. Katherine Morgan (née Lloyd) (m. 1999)
- Children: 2 daughters
- Education: Denstone College
- Occupation: Politician, hotelier, charity director

Philip Warren Hawksley (10 March 1943 – 9 March 2018) was a British Conservative politician, who served as MP for The Wrekin and Halesowen and Stourbridge.

== Early life ==
Hawksley was born at Oswestry, Shropshire, son of Bradshaw Warren Hawksley and his wife Monica Augusta. He was educated at Mill Mead Preparatory School in Shrewsbury and Denstone College. On leaving school he joined the employ of Lloyds Bank and was working in its Shrewsbury branch at his election to parliament in 1979. He was a governor at Wolverhampton Polytechnic from 1973 to 1977 and was a member of the West Mercia Police Authority from 1977 to 1981.

== Political life ==
Hawksley was elected as a Conservative member of Shropshire County Council in 1970, serving until 1981. He first attempted to enter parliament when he contested the marginal Labour seat of Wolverhampton North East unsuccessfully in the February and October 1974 general elections against its sitting MP Renée Short.

He was successful in gaining the also marginal Labour Wrekin seat in the 1979 general election by a majority of 965 votes from Gerry Fowler. He held it with a majority of 1,331 in the 1983 general election but lost it in 1987 to incoming Labour MP Bruce Grocott.

He was adopted as a parliamentary candidate in 1990 and returned to parliament in the 1992 general election for the safer seat of Halesowen and Stourbridge following the retirement of his predecessor Sir John Stokes. During his second time in the Commons he was one of the rebel 'Eurosceptic' Conservative MPs who refused to vote for the Maastricht Treaty. At the 1997 general election his constituency was reduced by boundary changes to the Stourbridge half of the area. He contested the new seat but lost it to Labour's Debra Shipley by 5,645 votes.

He served on the parliamentary Select Committees on Employment in 1986–87 and 1994–97, and on Home Affairs in 1996–97, as well as being joint secretary of the Conservative Backbench Committee for New Towns and Urban Affairs in 1984–87. (The New Town of Telford was then part of his Wrekin constituency.)

== Work outside parliament ==
Following his defeat in 1987, Hawksley and his then wife bought and built up the Edderton Hall hotel at Forden, Montgomeryshire, in Wales, selling it as a successful concern in 1997. From 1992 to 1998 he was honorary president of Catering Industries Liaison Council. In 1998 he became director of substance abuse charity Re-Solv and was director of the Society for the Prevention of Solvent and Volatile Substance Abuse from 1998 to 2008.

== Personal life ==
He married more than once, firstly in 1967 to Cynthia Higgins, with whom he had two daughters, later to Katherine Morgan (nee Lloyd) in 1999.

He died after a short illness at Fougères, Brittany, France, in March 2018, one day before his 75th birthday.

Parliament of the United Kingdom
Preceded by Gerry Fowler	Member of Parliament for The Wrekin; 1979–1987	Succeeded by Bruce Grocott
Preceded by Sir John Stokes	Member of Parliament for Halesowen and Stourbridge; 1992–1997	Constituency abolished (see Halesowen and Rowley Regis and Stourbridge)
