= John Stokes (Conservative politician) =

British politician (1917–2003)

Sir John Stokes

Member of Parliament for Halesowen and Stourbridge (Oldbury and Halesowen, 1970-1974)
- In office 18 June 1970 – 16 March 1992
- Preceded by: John Horner
- Succeeded by: Warren Hawksley

Personal details
- Born: John Heydon Romaine Stokes; 23 July 1917
- Died: 27 June 2003 (aged 85)
- Party: Conservative
- Spouses: Barbara Yorke (m. 1939; died 1988) Elsie F. Plowman (m. 1989; died 1990) Lady Ruth Bligh (m. 1991; div. 1996) Frances Packham (m. 1996)
- Children: 3
- Education: Haileybury
- Alma mater: Queen's College, Oxford

Sir John Heydon Romaine Stokes (23 July 1917 – 27 June 2003) was a British Conservative politician and Member of Parliament.

== Early life and career ==
The son of Victor Romaine Stokes, a stockjobber, Stokes was educated at Haileybury College and Queen's College, Oxford. He stood for election as president of the Oxford University Conservative Association on a platform of support for appeasement and General Franco, but lost out by seven votes to future Prime Minister Edward Heath. He served as president of The Oxford Monarchists.

During World War II Stokes served in the Royal Fusiliers, rising to the rank of Major. He took part in the expedition to Dakar in 1940 and was wounded in North Africa in 1943. From 1944-6 he served as military assistant to Major General Edward Spears and latterly Sir Terence Shone in Beirut and Damascus.

Following the war Stokes joined ICI as a personnel officer, moving to British Celanese in 1951 as personnel manager and to Courtaulds in 1957 as deputy personnel manager. He was a partner in his own firm of personnel consultants, Clive and Stokes, from 1959 to 1980.

== Political career ==
In 1964, Stokes contested Gloucester for the Conservatives. Two years later, he contested Hitchin and was defeated by Shirley Williams. He was elected MP for Oldbury and Halesowen at the 1970 general election and for its successor seat, Halesowen and Stourbridge in February 1974, holding the latter until stepping down in 1992.

He was a very active backbencher and described as an "old-fashioned Conservative who trusted his constituents' instincts about what was right and wrong. He looked the part of the typical Conservative who graced the Commons benches in the years after (and before) the Second World War. His Conservatism seemed to belong to an earlier, simpler age. Yet the House, on the whole, loved him, and listened to him."

He had little time for professional politicians. He argued that the backbenches in parliament needed more army officers, "more squires, landowners, and country gentlemen." He attributed the decline of deference in society to the demise of the officer classes from positions of influence. He was also a firm defender of the hereditary principle in the Upper House and wrote the foreword to a Monday Club booklet by Lord Sudeley entitled The Preservation of the House of Lords. In 1975 Stokes spoke against a Private Members Bill to abolish hereditary titles, which was defeated.

During the crippling strikes at British Leyland in the 1970s, Stokes suggested in the House that it might help the troubles there if a few of the ringleaders were taken out and shot. He was a staunch supporter of hanging. He believed that television generally, and the BBC in particular, had "corrupted our English civilisation, our taste and our morals".

He was Chairman of the Primrose League General Purposes Committee from 1971 to 1985.

In foreign affairs, Stokes was a supporter of Rhodesia and of the Turkish Cypriots. He served on parliamentary delegations to many countries; a delegate to the Council of Europe and Western European Union from 1983; in 1992, he led a Council of Europe delegation to observe the elections in Albania.

Stokes was one of several MPs who assailed the Provisional Irish Republican Army (PIRA) march through central London in June 1974 stating that it "was offensive to English people". In November 1974 he said that one of the principal concerns of the police at that time was control of entry to the UK mainland from both Northern Ireland and the Republic of Ireland, and he supported a call for the introduction of identity cards. He said that the nation's will was on trial: "a resolute and united nation can defeat this tiny handful of cruel and desperate men". In 1977, the PIRA was outlawed.

The following month, when the House of Commons debated a measure to give the Church of England clergy control over its doctrine and forms of worship, John Stokes said that he was a member of the Party that had its origins in "defence of Church and King". He said the measures had been got up by "a lot of trendy clergymen" who wanted to replace the traditional liturgy "with a lot of modern rubbish". A staunch mainstream Anglican, from 1985 to 1990, he was an elected member of the House of Laity within the General Synod of the Church of England. He was also a member of the Prayer Book Society, a group dedicated to the preservation of the Book of Common Prayer, and a Vice-President of the Royal Stuart Society.

Describing a House of Commons debate on Capital Transfer Tax in January 1975 as "the Tories' finest hour", Stokes subsequently wrote to the Daily Telegraph stating that "the Party really believes in the family, the family firm or farm, the woodlands, our historic houses, the value of savings, etc., and above all, of course, personal freedom, against the all-devouring Socialist State". He served on the select committee dealing with the work of the Ombudsman.

When Leon Brittan fell from grace during the Westland affair, Stokes announced that Brittan should be replaced by "a red-blooded, red-faced Englishman, preferably from the landed interests." (Brittan's parents were Jewish immigrants).

In 1990, following the Iraqi invasion of Kuwait, he criticised women who were vocally lobbying the Government to do more to release their husbands being held hostage by Saddam Hussein, quoting Shakespeare and accusing them of "mewling and puking".

=== Monday Club ===
John Stokes was a long-standing (joined prior to 1970) member of the Conservative Monday Club. He was a main speaker at the Club's Halt Immigration Now! meeting in Westminster Central Hall in September 1972, calling for a halt to all immigration, the repeal of the Race Relations Act and the start of a full repatriation scheme, the meeting's formal resolution being delivered to the then Prime Minister, Edward Heath. He was one of the principal speakers at the Club's two-day conference in Birmingham in March 1975, the title of which was The Conservative Party and the Crisis in Britain.

== Personal life ==
Stokes was married four times. He married firstly, on 23 December 1939 at All Souls Church, Langham Place, Barbara Yorke (died 1988), younger daughter of R. E. Yorke of Wellingborough, by whom he had one son and two daughters; he married secondly, on 21 January 1989 in Aylesbury Vale, Elsie F. Plowman (died 1990); he married thirdly, in 1991 in Aylesbury Vale, Lady (Ruth) Bligh, widow of Sir Timothy Bligh (who had been secretary to Harold Macmillan as Prime Minister), which marriage was dissolved in 1996; he married fourthly, in 1996 in the chapel of his alma mater, Queen's College, Oxford, Frances Packham, widow of Lieutenant-Commander Donald Packham.

== Publications ==
- Stokes, John, Crusader '80, in the Primrose League Gazette, vol.84, no.6, Nov/Dec 1980 edition, London.
- Stokes, John, The State of the Nation, in the Primrose League Gazette, vol.86, no.2, April 1982 edition, London.
- Stokes, John, The Falklands Spirit, in the Primrose League Gazette, vol.86, no.5, Nov/Dec 1982 edition, London.
- Stokes, John, The Church and the Bomb, in the Primrose League Gazette, vol.87, no.3, July 1983 edition, London.
- Stokes, John, Politics and The Church, in the Primrose League Gazette, vol.89, no.1, April/May 1985 edition, London.
- Stokes, John, An Issue Greater Than Party Advantage, in the Primrose League Gazette, vol.90, no.1, Feb/March 1986 edition, London.
- Stokes, John, A Long and Glorious History, in the Primrose League Gazette, vol.90, no.2, June/July 1986 edition, London.
- Stokes, John, The Condition of The People, in the Primrose League Gazette, vol.91, no.1, March/April 1987 edition, London.
- Stokes, John, The Place of the Book of Common Prayer in the Fabric of The Nation, in the Primrose League Gazette, vol.91, no.3, Nov/Dec 1987 edition, London.
- Stokes, John, A Quiet and Undemonstrable People, in the Primrose League Gazette, vol.92, no.1, April/May 1988 edition, London.

== Sources ==
- Copping, Robert, The Story of The Monday Club - The First Decade (April 1972), and The Monday Club - Crisis and After (May 1975), both published by the Current Affairs Information Service, Ilford, Essex, (both P/B).
- Black, A & C, Who's Who, London, 1986; ISBN 0-7136-2760-3
- Dodd's Parliamentary Companion, East Sussex, 1991; ISBN 0-905702-17-4

Parliament of the United Kingdom
Preceded by John Horner	Member of Parliament for Oldbury and Halesowen; 1970 – February 1974	Constituency abolished
New constituency	Member of Parliament for Halesowen and Stourbridge; February 1974 – 1992	Succeeded by Warren Hawksley
