= Ken Cameron (trade unionist) =

Ken Cameron (9 December 1941 – 16 May 2016) was a Scottish trade unionist. He was the head of the Fire Brigades Union for 20 years, from 1980 to 2000.

== Early life ==
Born in Fort William to an Irish Catholic mother and a Scottish father, who worked as a linesman for the General Post Office, Cameron attended Fort William Senior Secondary School until he was fifteen. His first job on leaving school was as a cadet in the Inverness-shire Constabulary, but he did not enjoy this and left to become a trainee reporter on the Aberdeen Press and Journal. This too was not a success; while covering the Drumnadrochit Highland Games, he was unable to work on his assignment. His friends tried to help out but mistakenly listed the girl who had won the egg-and-spoon race as having won the caber toss. Subsequently, while covering a swimming competition, he fell into the pool, disrupting the event, which led to him losing the job. Cameron spent time as a labourer on a hydro-electric scheme, before moving to Birmingham to join the fire brigade. While there, he developed an interest in horse racing, and became a supporter of Aston Villa F.C.

== Fire Brigades Union ==
He joined the Fire Brigades Union (FBU), becoming a full-time official and then, in 1980, its general secretary. His appointment was supported by his predecessor, Terry Parry, and also by Mick McGahey of the National Union of Mineworkers (NUM). Known as a socialist, Cameron undertook much activity in support of Nelson Mandela and against apartheid in South Africa. From 1981 to 1983, and again from 1991 until 1999, he served on the General Council of the Trades Union Congress (TUC), He was a supporter of rights for the people of Palestine and in 1982, was the first person to propose a motion in support of Palestine at the TUC. During the 1984/85 miners' strike, he campaigned in support of the miners and made a loan of £200,000 of FBU funds to the NUM. While he used threats to strike to successfully maintain pay and conditions for members, under his leadership, the union never needed to mount a strike. Cameron celebrated the Labour Party's general election win in 1997 but by 1999, Cameron was disillusioned with them, and he advocated that the FBU disaffiliate from Labour; this finally happened in 2004.

== Later life ==
He retired from the FBU in 2000, serving as chair of the People's Press Printing Society (publisher of the Morning Star) and on the Central Arbitration Committee, and moved to Glasgow. Cameron died at the age of 74, on 16 May 2016.

Trade union offices
Preceded by Terry Parry	General Secretary of the Fire Brigades Union; 1980 – 2000	Succeeded by Andy Gilchrist
