= Percy Kingdom =

Percival William John Kingdom (11 September 1880 – 1 April 1953) was a British firefighter and trade unionist.

Kingdom began work as a seaman at age 16 before becoming a firefighter. He joined the National Union of Corporation Workers, and when the firemen's branch split away to form the Firemen's Trade Union, he became increasingly prominent in the new union.

In 1929, Kingdom was elected as general secretary, and the following year renamed it as the Fire Brigades Union. In 1931, the London County Council cut firemen's wages, arguing that Metropolitan Police wages had also been cut. Kingdom argued that firemen's working hours should also be cut, to match those of the police. He was unsuccessful, but in 1932 he achieved an agreement that firemen's wages would thereafter follow those of the police when they were increased, and this happened in 1934.

At the 1934 London County Council election, the Labour Party won control of the council, and Kingdom hoped it would agree a 48-hour maximum working week for firefighters. Herbert Morrison disagreed, and the two became involved in a public dispute. On the outbreak of World War II, Kingdom was reluctant to accept members of the new Auxiliary Fire Service as members of the union, and when they did join, did little to represent them. In protest, three London firefighters, Bradley, Randall and Merrells, John Horner to stand against Kingdom for the general secretary post. Kingdom resigned as general secretary, without giving an explanation, and Horner won an election to replace him.

Trade union offices
Preceded by Jim Bradley	General Secretary of the Fire Brigades Union; 1929–1939	Succeeded by John Horner
