= Steve Wright (trade unionist) =

British trade union leader (born 1982/83)

Steve Wright (born 1982 or 1983) is a British trade union leader.

In 2001, Wright followed his father in becoming a firefighter, initially with the Buckinghamshire Fire and Rescue Service. He joined the Fire Brigades Union (FBU), and became a branch representative in 2002, during a union campaign on pay. In 2006, he transferred to the Oxfordshire Fire and Rescue Service. He later became the leader of the FBU's new southern region, and campaigned extensively on protecting firefighters from exposure to carcinogens. He was elected as vice president of the union in 2023.

In 2025, Wright was elected as general secretary of the FBU, defeating the incumbent, Matt Wrack, by 5,188 votes to 3,436.

Trade union offices
Preceded by Matt Wrack	General Secretary of the Fire Brigades Union; 2025–present	Succeeded by Incumbent
