= Enoch Humphries =

Scottish trade unionist

Enoch Humphries OBE (25 September 1922 – 1 July 2009) was a Scottish trade unionist and President of the Fire Brigades Union (FBU) and the Scottish Trades Union Congress.

== Early life ==
Humphries was born in Rutherglen, South Lanarkshire. He attended St David's Primary school and Townhead secondary school in Glasgow until he left school aged 14. He worked several jobs, the last as a cellarman for a whisky firm, before entering war service with the Royal Air Force

== Fire Service career ==
After demobilization in 1946, Humphries joined the Fire Service and the Fire Brigades Union. He soon became a delegate to the area committee and was elected Glasgow area sector secretary in 1949.

He was greatly influenced by the General Secretary of the Fire Brigades Union, John Horner. Horner was a member of the Communist Party of Great Britain, which Humphries had joined in 1948. Humphries resigned from the Communist Party in 1956 during the Hungarian Revolution.

Humphries ran unsuccessfully for the position of General Secretary of the Fire Brigade's Union in 1964, losing to Terry Parry by 2,000 votes. Humphries then assumed Parry's position as President of the Fire Brigades Union, an office he held until 1977. In 1968, he served as President of the Scottish Trades Union Congress.

He was appointed OBE in the 1977 New Year Honours.

== Retirement ==
During retirement, Humphries served as Vice-Chair of the Scottish Pensioners Forum.

On the day of his death, all of Strathclyde's fire stations flew their flags at half staff. He donated his body to medical science.

Political offices
Preceded by Terry Parry	President of the Fire Brigades Union; 1964–1977	Succeeded by Wilf Barber
