= National Fire Service =

Unified fire service in Great Britain during World War II

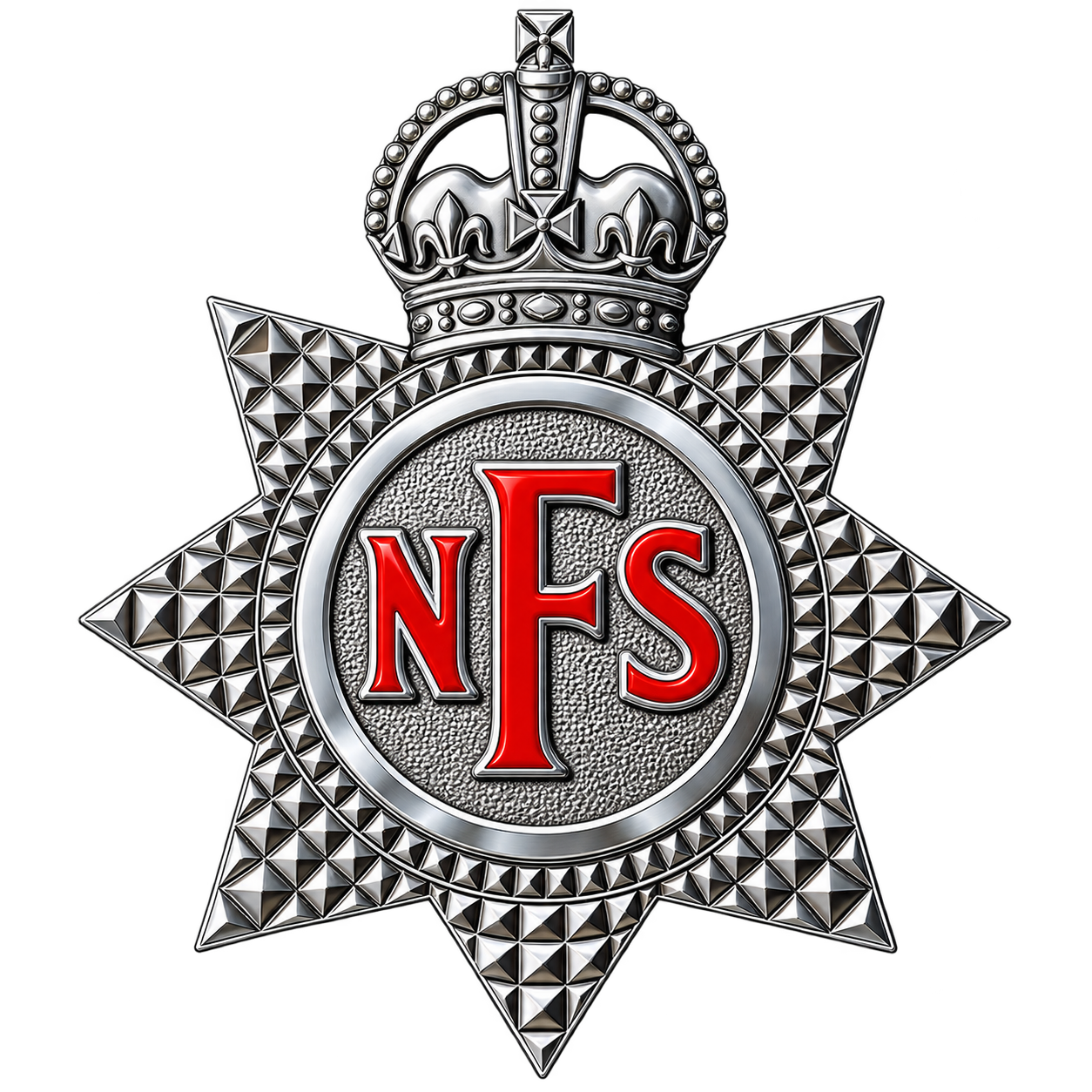

Operational area
- Country: United Kingdom
- Coverage: Great Britain

Agency overview
- Established: 18 August 1941
- Dissolved: 1 April 1948
- Employees: 370,000 (peak)
- Chief Fire Officer: Sir Aylmer Firebrace
- Directed by: Home Office

Facilities and equipment
- Divisions: 40 Fire Forces

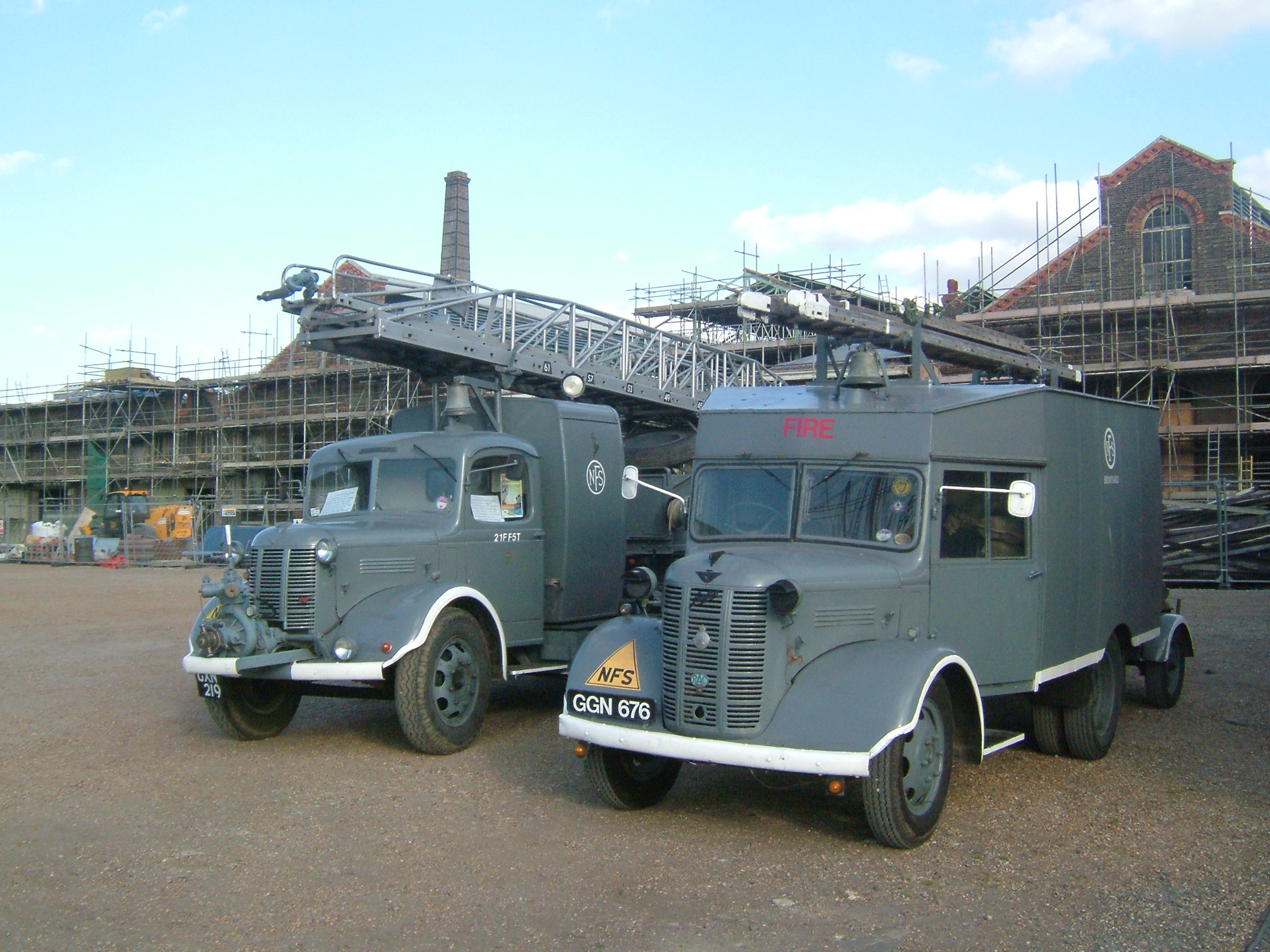
Preserved NFS firefighting vehicles

The National Fire Service (NFS) was the single fire service created in Great Britain in 1941 during the Second World War; a separate National Fire Service (Northern Ireland) was created in 1942.

== History ==
Second World War poster encouraging women to join the National Fire Service

The NFS was created in August 1941 by the amalgamation of the wartime national Auxiliary Fire Service (AFS) and the local authority fire brigades (about 1,600 of them). Prior to this, many police forces were charged with attending fires, with Liverpool City Police being an early example of a Police Fire Brigade. Amalgamating roles continued for some time until the need for a separate police and fire service was brought to the attention of the Home Office whom, on the report of a Royal Commission, brought about the NFS as a result of The Fire Brigade Act 1938.

The NFS existed until 1948, when it was again split by the Fire Services Act 1947, with fire services reverting to local authority control, although this time there were far fewer brigades, with only one per county and county borough.

The NFS had full-time and part-time members, male and female. Its uniform was the traditional dark blue double-breasted tunic, and it adopted the peaked cap worn by the AFS instead of the peakless sailor-style cap which had been worn by many pre-war fire brigades (including the London Fire Brigade). The peaked cap was retained by fire services after the war.

When they were on duty, but in the frequent long stretches between calls, many firemen and firewomen performed vital wartime manufacturing work, in workshops in the fire stations or adjacent to them. This was entirely voluntary, but since many of the wartime personnel had worked in factories before the war it was work with which they were familiar and skilled.

War service meant considerable risk, and members of the NFS were called to attend the aftermath of German bombing raids and coastal shelling from France, or often whilst these attacks were still ongoing. Casualties were inevitable, and there is one record of one volunteer who died on duty aged just 19, and was awarded the Certificate for Gallantry as a result. He is buried in the Hamilton Road Cemetery, Deal, Kent.

The Chief of the Fire Staff and Inspector-in-Chief throughout the war (until 28 February 1947, when he retired) was Sir Aylmer Firebrace, former Chief Officer of the London Fire Brigade.

At peak strength the NFS had 370,000 personnel, including 80,000 women. The women were mostly employed on administrative duties.

The NFS was divided into about forty Fire Forces. These were subdivided into Divisions. Each Division had two Columns and each Column had five Companies.

== Ranks ==
National Fire Service Ranks
	Men		Women		Police equivalent	
Insignia	Rank	Number in April 1947	Rank	Number in April 1947	London	Outside London
	Fireman		Firewoman		Constable	Constable
	Leading Fireman		Leading Firewoman			
	Section Leader		Senior Leading Firewoman		Sergeant	Sergeant
	Company Officer	1,100	Assistant Group Officer	50	Inspector	Inspector
	Senior Company Officer	250	Group Officer	27	Sub-Divisional Inspector	Chief Inspector
	Column Officer	382	Assistant Area Officer	1	Chief Inspector	Superintendent
	Divisional Officer	194	Area Officer	11	Superintendent	Chief Superintendent
	Assistant Fire Force Commander	52	Regional Woman Fire Officer	3	Deputy Commander	
	Fire Force Commander	53			Commander	
	Chief Regional Fire Officer					
N/A	Senior Staff Officer					
N/A	Inspector					
N/A	Chief of the Fire Staff & Inspector-in-Chief	1				

== Notable members ==
- Sir Frederick Delve (career firefighter and fire service administrator)
- Leslie Leete (career firefighter - later successor to Delve as chief officer of London Fire Brigade)

Members of the NFS who were well known in civilian life (or later became so) included:

- Len Johnson, boxer and civil rights activist (served in Manchester and Cumbria)
- Paul Brooks, cricketer (served in London and Coventry)

An eleven-minute Second World War documentary that chronicles the birth and work of the NFS survived the war and is available to view on the British Pathe website.

Service personnel received Certificate of Service documents.

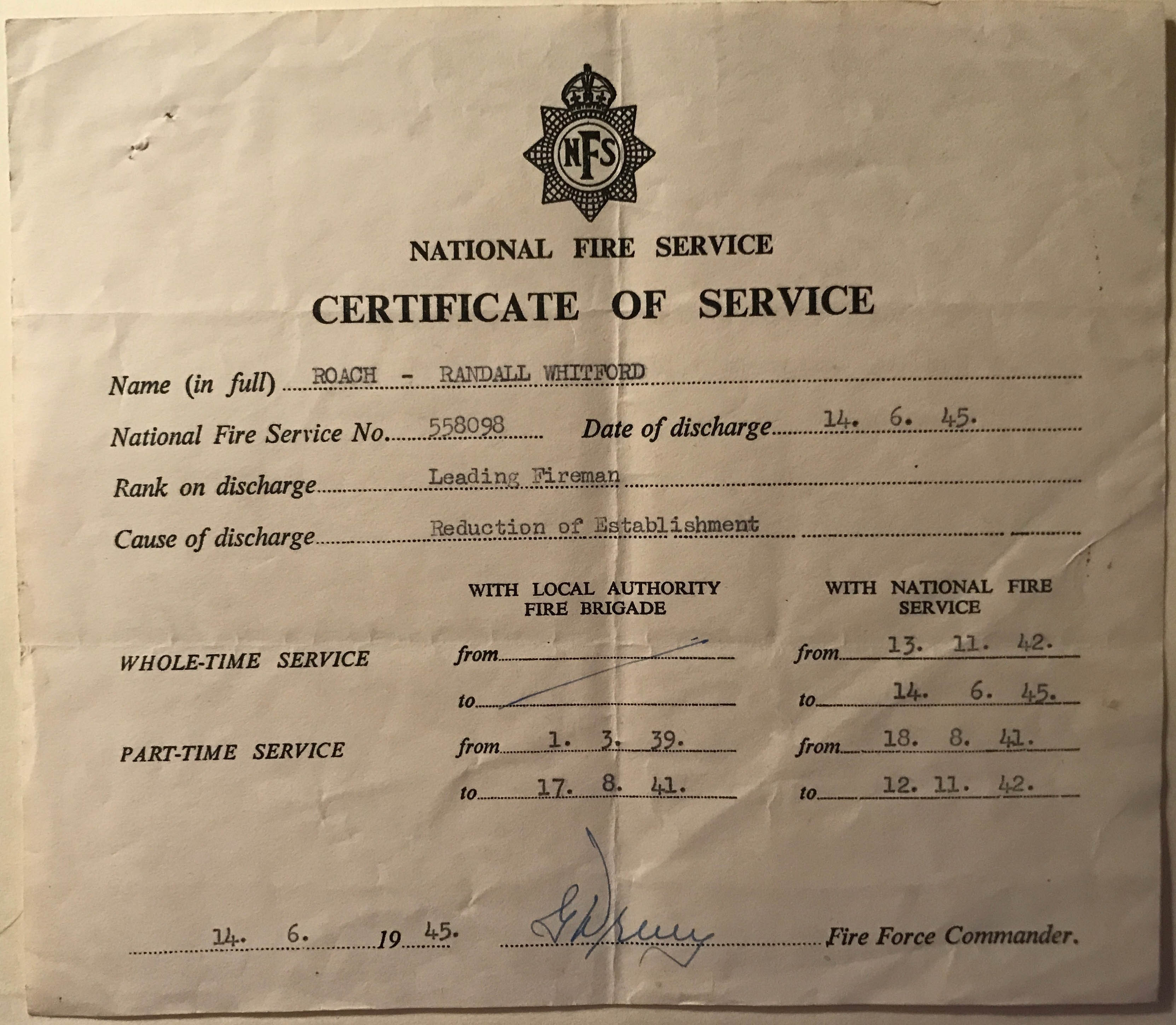
Certificate of Service for Leading Fireman, Randall Whitford Roach of Troon, Cornwall.

== See also ==
- 1941 Old Palace School bombing
- Ministry of Civil Aviation Aerodrome Fire Service
- Fire services in the United Kingdom
