= National Fire Savers Credit Union =

British not-for-profit member-owned financial co-operative

- Founded: 1998
- Type: Industrial and Provident Society
- Location(s): London Fire Brigade, Union Street; London, SE1; United Kingdom
- Website: firesavers.org.uk

National Fire Savers Credit Union Limited is a not-for-profit member-owned financial co-operative, based in the London Borough of Southwark and operating throughout Great Britain. It has assets in excess of £11,000,000.

Membership is open to all firefighters and staff working for any of the fire and rescue authorities in England, Scotland and Wales.

It is a member of the Association of British Credit Unions Limited, registered under the Credit Union Act 1979.

The credit union provides a financial community where members mutually benefit by pooling their savings to lend to one another.

== History ==
London Fire Savers Credit Union was formed in 1998, to enable London firefighters and their families to access affordable credit and secure savings.

In 2010, London Fire Savers became National Fire Savers Credit Union by extension of the common bond to include all firefighters, wherever they are serving in Great Britain.

From 617 active members in 1998, the credit union has steadily grown each year. As of 2018, it has 3,042 active members.

== Activities ==
The members of a credit union must share a common bond. In the case of National Fire Savers, membership is restricted to employees of the fire and rescue services in England, Scotland and Wales.

They also accept retired firefighters and fire brigade staff along with employees of the Firefighters Charity, the Fire Brigades Union and London Fire Brigade Welfare Fund. Existing members remain eligible for life, even if they leave the service or retire.

National Fire Savers runs a payroll deduction savings and loans scheme in conjunction with London Fire Brigade and affiliated brigades. The credit union is responsible for the operation of the scheme, with the brigade facilitating monthly deductions from salary.

=== Savings ===
Credit unions don't pay interest on savings, instead they return a dividend to members based on financial success over the previous year. Dividend is calculated after the accounts have been audited and it is approved at the Annual General Meeting.

In 2017, total dividend paid by National Fire Savers was £158,088.

There are three types of savings account offered: the basic membership account; Savings Plus, which pays an enhanced dividend for members with at least £1,000 to save; and the Christmas club, which does not attract dividend.

National Fire Savers Credit Union is authorised by the Prudential Regulation Authority and regulated by the Financial Conduct Authority and PRA.

Ultimately, like the banks and building societies, members’ savings are protected against business failure by the Financial Services Compensation Scheme.

=== Lending ===
The loan policy allows members to borrow up to three times the balance of their savings plus £2,000, less the outstanding balance of any existing loans. There are five types of loan available: the Everyday Loan and Member Loans, for members of at least three months standing; the larger Non-Affiliate Loan and Affiliate Loans, for members whose contributions are collected by payroll deduction; and the Savers Loan, for those who want to keep their savings but still require a loan.

== See also ==
- Credit unions in the United Kingdom
- Fire services in the United Kingdom
- British co-operative movement
