= Fire Brigades Union =

Trade union in the UK for firefighters

- Founded: 1918; 108 years ago
- Headquarters: Kingston upon Thames
- Location: United Kingdom
- Members: ▼33,717 (2024)
- General Secretary: Steve Wright
- Assistant General Secretary: Ben Selby
- President: Ian Murray
- Affiliations: Labour Party (1918–2004; 2015–present); Amnesty International; TUC; ICTU; STUC; TUCG; The European Federation of Public Service Unions; PSI; CSC; JFC; PSC
- Website: fbu.org.uk

The Fire Brigades Union (FBU) is a trade union in the United Kingdom for wholetime firefighters (including officers up to chief fire officer / firemaster), retained firefighters and emergency control room staff.

== History ==
=== Early 20th century ===
The first recorded instance of trade union organisation of firefighters was when the Municipal Employees' Association recruited several London County Council firemen in early 1905, which by the end of the following year had grown to a branch of 500.

After the entire branch had transferred to the rival National Union of Corporation Workers (NUCW), the branch grew to 1,100 of the 1,300 London firemen and to protect the then branch secretary from potential dismissal, sub-officer E. W. Southgate handed over branch secretaryship to Jim Bradley, a London park-keeper who had been nominated by the union's executive.

Following the strike of police officers on 29 August 1918, Bradley organised a secret ballot of firemen on the issue of strike action over pay and conditions. After winning the right to a representative board for London firemen, the fire brigade branch of NUCW seceded from the union to join the Firemen's Trade Union, what had been a friendly society for around 200 firemen in private brigades led by George Gamble, with Bradley becoming assistant secretary.

In 1930, the union changed its name to the Fire Brigades Union.

=== Second World War ===
The Air Raid Precautions Act (1937) contained provisions for recruiting a volunteer force of auxiliaries to supplement existing fire brigades, which were called up on 1 September 1939. The 95,000 called up (89,000 men, 6,000 women) formed the Auxiliary Fire Service (AFS) far outnumbered the around 6,000 full-time regulars. AFS firefighters were on worse conditions, with regular firemen promoted to be their officers. The war emergency also saw the re-instatement of continuous duty service, which was dropped after a week in favour of a 112-hour week.

The question of the AFS transformed the union, the incumbent leadership, headed by General Secretary Percy Kingdom, held that the AFS were dilutees and therefore should be marginalised. This view was challenged by John Horner and other young firemen and over the course of a protracted dispute which saw all the union's full-time officials resign, Horner was elected General Secretary. Horner then began organising auxiliaries, winning endorsement of this at the 1940 conference of the regular section of the union and saw the union's membership increase from 3,500 in 1939 to 66,500 in 1940.

As a result of the London Blitz, the fire service was nationalised in 1941 by the powers of the Fire Services (Emergency Provisions) Bill.

=== 21st century ===
Led by its then General Secretary Andy Gilchrist, the union called a strike over pay and conditions in 2002, following an independent review of pay carried out by the same organisation that reviewed MPs' pay. The strike did not achieve its goals, and on 5 May 2005 a left wing candidate, Matt Wrack, defeated Gilchrist in the election for General Secretary, attaining 63.9% of the vote cast (12,883 votes) on a total turnout of about 40% of the membership.

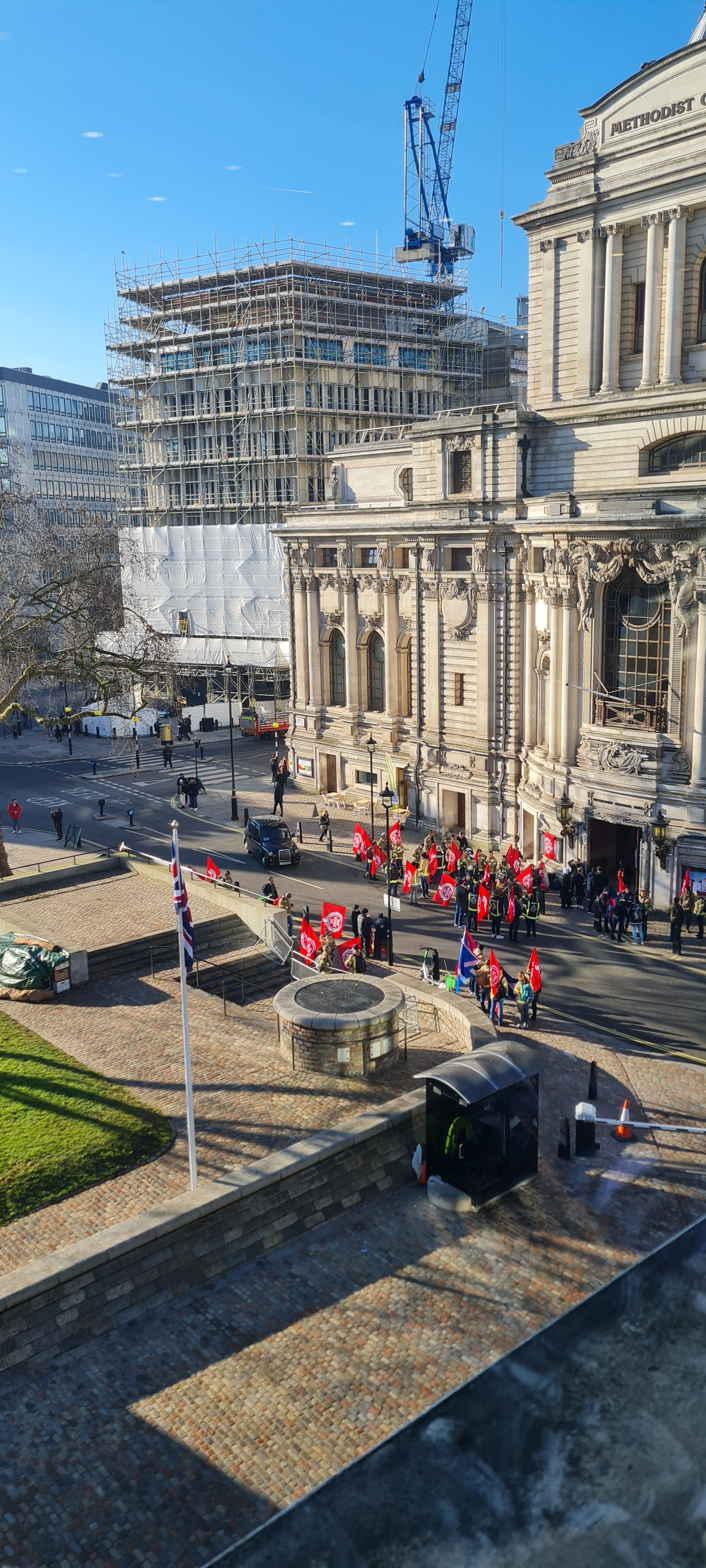
FBU Picketing on 8 Feb 2023

In August 2013, FBU members were balloted with 78% voting in favour of industrial action, in a dispute of pensions. The first strike took place on 25 September 2013 for four hours. Periods of industrial action continued throughout 2013 and 2014, when the dispute escalated with a 96-hour strike called from 31 October to 4 November 2014.

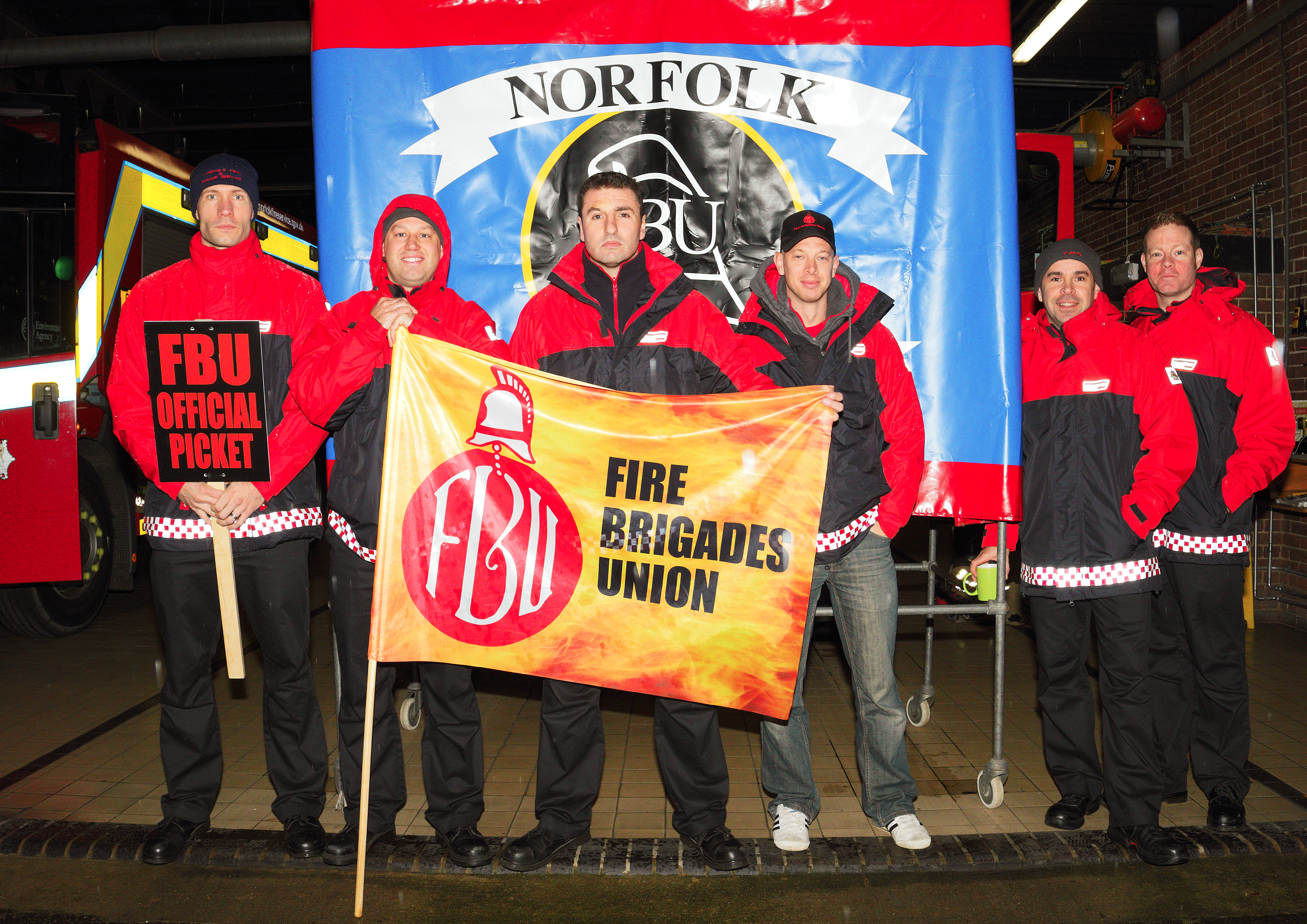
A Fire Brigades Union picket at Sprowston Road Fire Station in November 2013

On 30 January 2023, FBU members voted to go on strike, with 88% in favour of strike action, on a 73% turnout. On 11 February 2023 the FBU recommended that its members accept a revised pay offer of a 7% rise backdated to July 2022 and a further 5% increase from 1 July 2023, and it postponed planned strike action for workers to vote on the offer.

In February 2024, 114 firefighters who had attended the Grenfell Tower fire in 2017 were awarded a total of £20m in a lawsuit led by the FBU against the Royal Borough of Kensington and Chelsea, Arconic, Celotex, and Saint-Gobain.

In January 2025, Matt Wrack lost his bid for re-election to the union's vice-president, Steve Wright, by 1,752 votes. However, later the FBU discovered the independent scrutineer had never sent ballot papers to 3,059 members, more than the majority, which could have required the election be rerun. Wrack decided not to stand again, saving the FBU from rerunning the election.

== Relations with the Labour Party ==
The FBU disaffiliated from the Labour Party in 2004 due to the union's opposition of policies put in place by the then prime minister and party leader, Tony Blair. In November 2015, the FBU re-affiliated with the Labour Party due to the union's backing of the party's new leader Jeremy Corbyn and his commitment to anti-austerity politics.

=== Parliamentary elections ===
The union sponsored Labour Party candidates in several Parliamentary elections.

Election	Constituency	Candidate	Votes	Percentage	Position
1964 general election	Oldbury and Halesowen	John Horner	22,099	40.6	1
1966 general election	Oldbury and Halesowen	John Horner	28,490	53.2	1
1970 general election	Oldbury and Halesowen	John Horner	26,499	47.4	2

== Other activities ==
=== Climate crisis ===
In 2020, the FBU co-signed a letter with Friends of the Earth and Greenpeace to Chancellor of the Exchequer Rishi Sunak warning that fire services in the UK were "exposed and ill-resourced to respond effectively to a climate in breakdown." In 2023, the union released a report in which it said that the UK was "woefully underprepared" to handle the increased risk of wildfires caused by the climate crisis.

=== Palestine ===
The FBU has maintained a support team for firefighters in the occupied Palestinian territories since the 1980s. In 2011, the Scottish branch of the union donated two fire engines to the city of Nablus in the West Bank. In 2024, the union advised its members not to comply with police requests to help remove protestors protesting against the Israel-Hamas War.

=== Contaminated Land ===
In 2025, the FBU endorsed Zane's Law, a proposed reform of contaminated land legislation named after Zane Gbangbola, and called for stronger regulation to protect firefighters and the public from hazardous landfill gases.

== Controversies ==
A report commissioned by the FBU itself in 2023 found that a third of female members of the union had experienced sexual harassment at union events.

== Officials ==
=== General secretaries ===
- 1918–1922 George Gamble
- 1922–1929 Jim Bradley
- 1929–1939 Percy Kingdom
- 1939–1964 John Horner
- 1964–1980 Terry Parry
- 1980–2000 Ken Cameron
- 2000–2005 Andy Gilchrist
- 2005–2025 Matt Wrack
- 2025–present Steve Wright

=== Assistant general secretaries ===
- 1939 Harry Short
- 1946 Jack Grahl
- 1957 Tom Harris
- 1974 Dick Foggie
- 1982–2005 Mike Fordham
- 2005–2023 Andy Dark
- 2023 - Ben Selby

=== Presidents ===
- 1939–1944 Gus Odlin
- 1944–1959 John Burns
- 1959–1964 Terry Parry
- 1964–1977 Enoch Humphries
- 1977–1979 Wilf Barber
- 1979–1986 Bill Deal
- 1986–1991 Stan Fitzsimmons
- 1991–1999 Ronnie Scott
- 1999–2002 Mick Harper
- 2002–2007 Ruth Winters
- 2007–2010 Mick Shaw
- 2011–2018 Alan McLean
- 2018–present Ian Murray

== See also ==
- National Fire Savers Credit Union
- Frank Bailey
