= John Horner (British politician) =

British firefighter, trade unionist and politician

Frederick John Horner
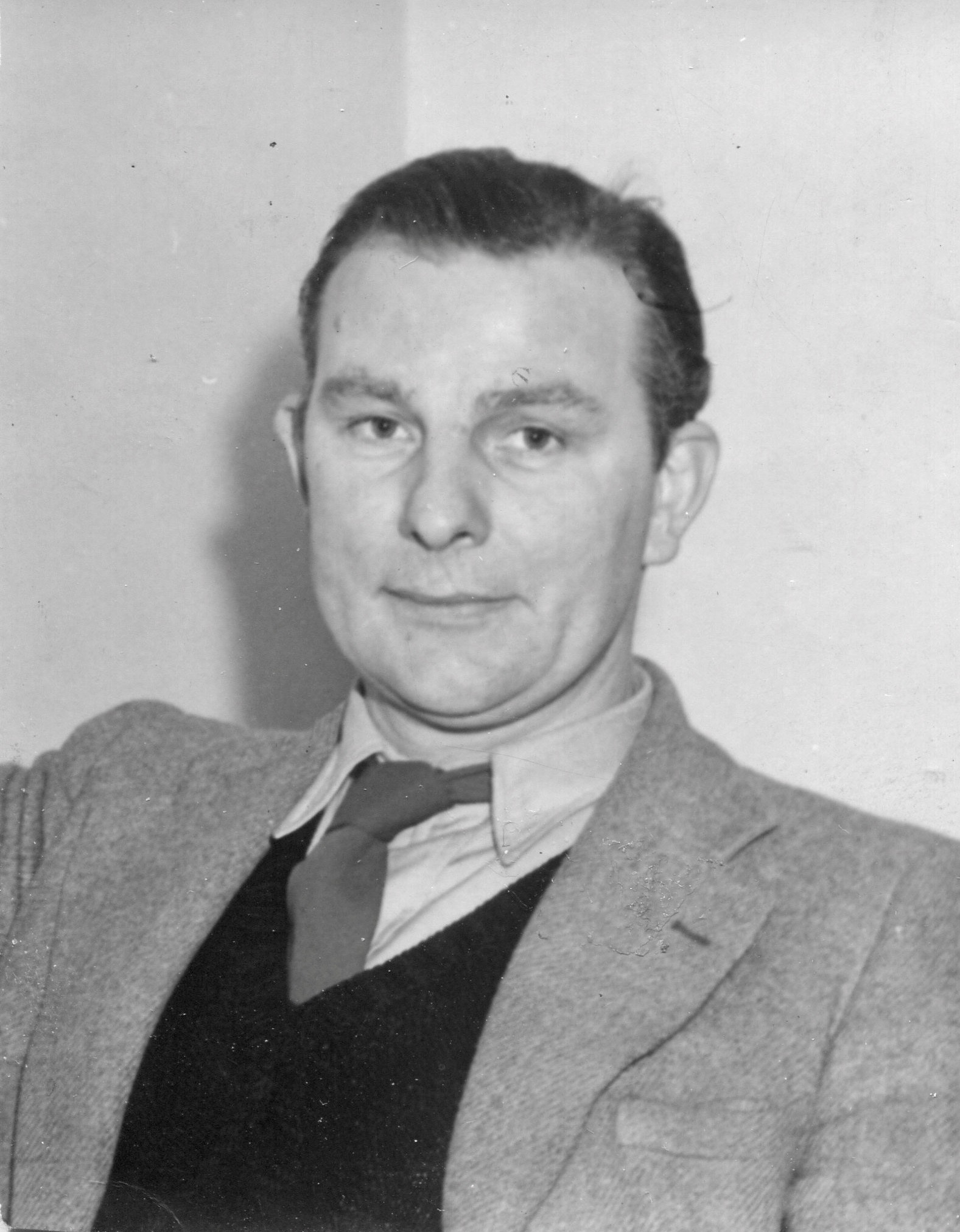
- Horner c. 1945

Member of Parliament for Oldbury and Halesowen
- In office 15 October 1964 – 29 May 1970
- Preceded by: Arthur Moyle
- Succeeded by: John Stokes

Personal details
- Born: 5 November 1911 Walthamstow, London, England
- Died: 11 February 1997 (aged 85)

Frederick John Horner (5 November 1911 – 11 February 1997) was a British firefighter, trade unionist and politician, best known for creating the modern Fire Brigades Union.

== Early life ==
Horner was born and grew up in the working-class London suburb of Walthamstow, the son of an illiterate building labourer. Encouraged by his mother, he won a rare scholarship to the Sir George Monoux Grammar School but his father's work was irregular and because of the pressure on family finances, the headmaster advised Horner to skip a year of schooling to matriculate early. He was found a job as a junior trainee buyer at Harrods, the luxury department store but already radicalised by the 1926 General Strike and by the socialists he was meeting at a local Quaker evening school, he found the job intolerable and after a year left Harrods for the Merchant Navy.

In 1933, Horner returned home from sea to take the examination for a second mate's certificate but the depression of the 1930s meant many ships were laid up and it was impossible for a newly qualified officer to find work. After some months of unemployment Horner was recruited into the London Fire Brigade (LFB) and following his getting top marks at the training school he was summoned before the LFB's deputy Chief Officer, Sir Aylmer Firebrace to learn he was to be posted to headquarters at Southwark on a fast track for promotion.

== Fire Brigades Union ==
Horner soon became active in the Fire Brigades Union that in 1934 had just over 2000 members, most of whom were in the LFB under the control of London County Council (LCC) that was refusing to reduce firefighters' weekly hours from 72 to 48. Horner became a vocal critic of the FBU's General Secretary, Percy Kingdom for his failure to secure concessions from the LCC and when he became known as a young firebrand, his superiors warned Horner that he was risking his chances of promotion. Eventually, in 1937 he was transferred from headquarters to Euston Fire Station, as a known troublemaker. When the Government established the Auxiliary Fire Service (AFS) as part of its Air Raids Precautions programme and Horner was one of the radical Young Turks in the FBU calling for a strategic response to the AFS volunteers whose conditions of employment were on worse terms than those of the regular firefighters. When Kingdom failed to respond, this radical group nominated Horner to stand against Kingdom for election as FBU General Secretary and when Kingdom then unexpectedly resigned, Horner engaged in a confused process, described by one obituarist as ' a left-wing coup', that found him elected in June 1939 as the new General Secretary, aged 27.

When the Second World War started a few weeks later, tens of thousands of auxiliary firefighters were called up and flooded into the fire stations. Horner ignored the advice of the General Secretary of the Trades Union Congress (TUC), Walter Citrine, that the FBU should ignore the auxiliaries and instead created an AFS section of the FBU that was eventually merged with the regular FBU in 1943. Union membership jumped to over 70,000. During the Blitz of 1940–41, Horner visited every fire station in the country, supporting his members on the front line of the UK's civil defence against the bombs and successfully campaigned for improvement in the AFS employment conditions. When the Government created the National Fire Service in 1941, he launched a high-profile campaign for the Firemen's Charter that included a nationally set wage and other improvements. He enlisted the support of well-known public figures and 400 mass meetings were organised across the country. Not all of the Charter's demands were met but they had won a significant pay increase and 'it was an impressive beginning to an era of increasing success for the FBU'. Horner's landmark achievement was the Home Office's recognition that the Union was a stakeholder in the fire service with a legitimate voice in how it should be organised and managed.

As the War drew to an end, the auxiliary firefighters returned to their peacetime jobs and by 1948 the FBU membership had shrunk to around 18000, about ninety percent of the workforce. In the years that followed Horner continued to campaign for shorter hours, improved pensions and better firefighting equipment, although in 1950 he lost the demand for continued parity with police wages. By 1960 he had increasingly shifted his attention to arguing for a technical and highly trained fire service with a significant, additional role in fire prevention. He became a 'relentless opponent of cost-cutting and carelessness' . After twenty-five years as General Secretary, he stepped down in 1964 and later that year was elected as Labour MP for Oldbury and Halesowen.

== Political life ==
As a young fireman, Horner had the reputation of a 'Bolshie'. While waiting for the bells to go down at Southwark Fire Station, he read Marxist literature and the Daily Worker and when off duty attended British Communist Party meetings. His wife Pat, who he married in 1936, was also a communist sympathiser, heavily involved in supporting Republican Spain during the Civil War. By his own admission, Horner was a crypto-communist during the Second World War, attending both Labour Party conferences and meetings of Communist Party members in the FBU. Many of the FBU's officials were communists, including Bob Darke whose book, The Communist Technique (Penguin 1952) made detailed allegations about Horner and the influence of the Communist Party on the FBU.

In 1945 Horner turned down offers for him to stand as a Labour candidate in that year's General Election and instead formally joined the British Communist Party, a decision he was later to regret. He was a valued asset to the Communist Party and served on its executive committee. During the post-war decade, there were few unions so strongly communist in its leadership as the FBU that followed the Party line on Cold War issues such as the Korean War and German rearmament, resulting in the TUC leadership blocking Horner's election to the TUC General Council.

In 1956, Horner and his wife Pat resigned from the Communist Party around the time of the Soviet invasion of Hungary. Horner rejoined the Labour Party and threw himself into supporting the Campaign for Nuclear Disarmament, founded in 1958. At the 1960 Labour Party Conference, he seconded Frank Cousins in moving the successful resolution for unilateral nuclear disarmament. After his election to Parliament in 1964, he became an effective and hardworking back-bencher, serving on the Select Committee on Nationalised Industries. Fellow MP, Tam Dalyell was to wrote that Horner was denied the ministerial office that many of his contemporaries thought he deserved because Harold Wilson, the Prime Minister, was too nervous about appointing such a prominent ex-communist. In 1970, Horner lost his seat in the general election and retired to live with Pat in Ross-on-Wye. His book, Studies in Industrial Democracy (Gollancz) was published in 1974. Horner was known as a great raconteur and a polymath, fascinated by art, literature and philosophy with a deep interest in history and 'an impeccable guide to the castles, churches and village inns of the Welsh borders'.

Parliament of the United Kingdom
| Preceded by Arthur Moyle | Member of Parliament for Oldbury and Halesowen; 1964 – 1970 | Succeeded by John Stokes |
